= Corday–Morgan Prize =

Award of the Royal Society of Chemistry

Corday–Morgan Medal and Prize
- Awarded for: The most meritorious contributions to chemistry
- Sponsored by: Royal Society of Chemistry
- Date: 1949
- Reward: £5000
- Website: rsc.org/ScienceAndTechnology/Awards/CordayMorganPrizes

The Corday–Morgan Medal and Prize is awarded by the Royal Society of Chemistry for the most meritorious contributions to experimental chemistry, including computer simulation. The prize was established by chemist Gilbert Morgan, who named it after his father Thomas Morgan and his mother Mary-Louise Corday. From the award's inception in 1949 until 1980 it was awarded by the Chemical Society. Up to three prizes are awarded annually.

== Recipients ==
The Corday–Morgan medallists have included many of the UK's most successful chemists. Since 1949 they have been:

- 2026: Hugo Bronstein, Ifan Stephens, Yimon Aye
- 2025: Kim Jelfs, Mauro Pasta, Stephen Goldup
- 2024: Gonçalo Bernardes, Matthew Gibson, Marina Kuimova
- 2023: Graeme Day, Carmen Domene, Tomislav Friščić, Richard Layfield
- 2022: Andrew Dove, Rebecca Goss
- 2021: Matthew Fuchter, Junwang Tang, Jan R. R. Verlet
- 2020: Madhavi Krishnan, Rachel O'Reilly, Edward W. Tate
- 2019: Roel Dullens, Igor Larrosa, Aron Walsh
- 2018: Erwin Reisner, Oren Scherman, Magdalena Titirici
- 2017: Andrew Goodwin, Eva Hevia, Tuomas Knowles
- 2016: Ian Fairlamb, Angelos Michaelides, Charlotte Williams
- 2015: Sharon Ashbrook, Andrei Khlobystov, Stephen Liddle
- 2014: Milo Shaffer, David R. Spring, Molly Stevens
- 2013: Matthew Gaunt, Martin Heeney, Jonathan P. Reid
- 2012: Polly Arnold, Leroy Cronin, David K. Smith
- 2011: Michaele Hardie, Frederick R. Manby, Jonathan Nitschke
- 2010: Euan Brechin, Jason W. Chin, Jonathan Steed
- 2009: Andrew de Mello, Duncan Graham, Andrew Cooper
- 2008: Stephen Faulkner, Adam Nelson, David Tozer
- 2006: Neil R. Champness, Timothy J. Donohoe, Jeremy N. Harvey
- 2005: Benjamin G. Davis, Helen H. Fielding, Philip A. Gale
- 2004: Stuart C. Althorpe, David MacMillan, James H. Naismith
- 2003: Jonathan Clayden, Michael W. George, Guy Lloyd-Jones
- 2002: Alan Armstrong, Shankar Balasubramanian, Russell E. Morris, Stephen D. Price
- 2001: Harry Anderson, Gideon Davies, Steven M. Howdle, Patrick Unwin
- 2000: Colin D. Bain, Matthew Rosseinsky, Jonathan M. J. Williams
- 1999: Kenneth David Maclean Harris, Christopher A. Hunter, Michael D. Ward
- 1998: Varinder Aggarwal, J. Paul Attfield, Donald Craig
- 1997: Ian Manners, David E. Manolopoulos, Dermot O'Hare
- 1996: Duncan Bruce, Mark J. Hampden-Smith, Nicholas Turner
- 1995: Andrew R. Barron, Jeremy G. Frey, Gerard Parkin
- 1993–1994: Vernon C. Gibson, Nigel Simon Simpkins, Timothy Softley
- 1992: Paul D. Beer, Timothy C. Gallagher, David Edwin Logan
- 1991: David Gani, Jeremy Hutson, Stephen Mann
- 1990: David Crich, Patrick William Fowler, Ian P. Rothwell
- 1989: Michael Ashfold, David Clary, Martin Schröder
- 1988: Geoffrey Cloke, Gareth A. Morris, Peter J. Sarre, Stephen G. Withers
- 1987: John M. Newsam, A. Guy Orpen, David Parker
- 1986: Anthony Barrett, George Christou, Paul R. Raithby
- 1985: William Clegg, Peter Edwards, Christopher J. Moody
- 1984: N. John Cooper, Stephen G. Davies, Anthony Harriman
- 1983: David J. Cole-Hamilton, W Jones, William B. Motherwell
- 1982: Anthony Cheetham, Robert H. Crabtree, Tom Simpson
- 1981: Christopher M. Dobson, Brian J. Howard, David A. Jefferson
- 1980: Gus Hancock, Selby Knox, Steven V. Ley
- 1979: Malcolm H. Chisholm, Geraldine A. Kenney-Wallace, Stanley M. Roberts
- 1978: Philip D. Magnus, Michael Mingos, George M. Sheldrick
- 1977: Laurence Barron, Bernard Thomas Golding, J. Steven Ogden
- 1976: Melvyn Rowen Churchill, Roger Grice, Kevin M. Smith
- 1975: Robert J. Donovan, John Anthony Osborn, Gerald Pattenden
- 1974: Laurance D. Hall, Brian F. G. Johnson, Alexander McKillop
- 1973: Jack Baldwin, Geoffrey Luckhurst, John Forster Nixon
- 1972: Malcolm Green, David Husain, Peter George Sammes
- 1971: Michael John Perkins, Leon Phillips, Peter L. Timms
- 1970: A. David Buckingham, Don Cameron, Neville B. H. Jonathan
- 1969: Peter Day, Malcolm Green, Gordon W. Kirby
- 1968: A Fish, Frank McCapra, Dudley Howard Williams
- 1967: Alan Carrington, Richard Norman, John Meurig Thomas
- 1966: Richard Dixon, Malcolm Tobe
- 1965: John Cadogan, Ronald Mason
- 1964: H. Monty Frey, A. Ian Scott
- 1963: George Andrew Sim
- 1962: Neil Bartlett
- 1961: Franz Sondheimer
- 1960: Robert Haszeldine
- 1959: Alan Battersby
- 1958: Charles Kemball
- 1957: George Wallace Kenner
- 1956: Kenneth Winfield Bagnall
- 1955: George Porter
- 1954: Rex Richards
- 1953: John Cornforth
- 1952: James Baddiley
- 1951: Frederick Sanger
- 1950: Ronald Sydney Nyholm
- 1949: Derek Barton

== See also ==
- List of chemistry awards
