= Marlow Award =

Award granted by the Royal Society of Chemistry

The Marlow Medal and Prize is an early-career award in physical chemistry given by the Royal Society of Chemistry. One or two prizewinners each year, who must be junior researchers under 35 or within 10 years of completing their doctorate, receive £2000 and hold lectures at universities in the UK. The award was established in 1957 and commemorates the chemist George Stanley Withers Marlow (1889–1948).

Award winners are also entitled to £3000 in travel expenses to give a lecture tour in Australia, New Zealand, Singapore or Malaysia. This lecture series, instituted in 1981, is named for Robert Anthony Robinson (1903–1979).

== Winners ==
2026	Reshma Rao
2025	Chun Ann Huang
2024	Reinhard Maurer
2023	Bryan Bzdek
2022	Basile Curchod
2021	Brianna Heazlewood
2020	Radha Boya
2019	Samuel Stranks, University of Cambridge.
2018	Artem Bakulin
2017	Steven F. Lee
2016	Józef R. Lewandowski
2015	Philipp Kukura, Flemming Hansen
2014	Cinzia Casiraghi
2013	Andrew Goodwin
2012	Robert Best
2011	Sharon Ashbrook
2010	Angelos Michaelides
2008	Stefan Willitsch
2007	Alessandro Troisi
2006	Frederick R. Manby
2005	Julie V. Macpherson
2004	Jonathan Reid
2003	Darren J. Caruana
2002	Jonathan W. Essex
2001	Helen H. Fielding
2000	Jonathan A. Jones
1999	Andrew Orr-Ewing
1998	Stephen D. Price
1997	Patrick Unwin
1996	Kenneth David Maclean Harris
1995	David E. Manolopoulos
1994	Peter J. Knowles
1993	George S. Attard
1992	not awarded
1991	Stephen Keith Scott
1990	David Logan
1989	James Edward Baggott
1988	Steven J. Sibener
1987	Michael Ashfold
1986	David Clary
1985	Dominic Tildesley
1984	Neville V. Richardson
1983	David W. Oxtoby
1981	Godfrey S. Beddard, Graham Richard Fleming
1980	John Paul Maier
1979	Thomas F. George
1978	R. Guy Woolley
1977	Jonathan N. L. Connor
1976	James Joseph Burton
1975	Geoffrey Duxbury
1974	Roger Grice
1973	Karl F. Freed
1972	Graham Richards
1971	Geoffrey Luckhurst
1970	Michael Arthur Alderson Clyne
1969	John Michael White
1968	Michael Anthony Atherton
1967	C. N. Ramachandra Rao
1966	Alan Carrington
1965	Alastair M. North
1963	Stuart A. Rice
1962	John C. Polanyi
1961	John Stanley Griffith
1959	Peter Gray
1958	John Pople
1957	John Shipley Rowlinson

== See also ==
- List of chemistry awards
