= Nicholas Turner =

Nicholas Turner may refer to:

- Nicholas Turner (cricketer) (born 1983), New Zealand cricketer
- Nicholas Turner (chemist), British chemist
