= Rachel O'Reilly =

British chemist

Rachel O'Reilly MBE FRS FRSC
- Education: Imperial College London; University of Cambridge
- Scientific career
- Workplaces: University of Birmingham; University of Warwick; University of Cambridge; Washington University in St. Louis
- Thesis: Novel catalyst design for utilisation in controlled radical polymerisations
- Doctoral advisor: Vernon C. Gibson

Rachel Kerry O'Reilly MBE FRS FRSC is a British chemist and Professor at the University of Birmingham. She works at the interface of biology and materials, creating polymers that can mimic natural nanomaterials such as viruses and cells. She is a Fellow of the Royal Society of Chemistry and of the Royal Society.

== Education ==
O'Reilly was born in Holywood and educated in a grammar school. She has dyslexia. She studied Natural Sciences at the University of Cambridge, working with Brian F. G. Johnson on her Master's project, and graduated in 1999. She moved to Imperial College London to work with Vernon C. Gibson on catalyst design, earning a PhD in 2003.

== Career ==
O'Reilly joined Craig Hawker and Karen L. Wooley at Washington University in St. Louis. Here she demonstrated the fabrication of cross-linked polymer nanoparticles that were Click-ready. O'Reilly was awarded a 2004 Royal Commission for the Exhibition of 1851 fellowship, and took up a research fellowship at Downing College, Cambridge, in 2005. At the University of Cambridge she was awarded a Royal Society Dorothy Hodgkin fellowship. She developed hollow polymeric nanocages that could selectively recognise substrates.

She joined the University of Warwick in 2009 as an Engineering and Physical Sciences Research Council career-acceleration fellow. Her fellowship explored water-soluble responsive polymer scaffolds that contained domains for catalysis as well as responsive polymers that could trigger the release of catalysts into the media surrounding them. She was appointed Professor in 2012 at the age of 34. That year she was the first ever UK winner of the International Union of Pure and Applied Chemistry Samsung Young Polymer Scientist prize. She appeared on Start the Week with Andrew Marr in 2012, where he described her as a "a chemist who does strange things with plastics". In 2013 she was awarded the American Chemical Society Hermann Mark Young Scholar award. She was appointed Professor of Chemistry at the University of Birmingham in 2017.

Alongside her research, O'Reilly is a keen geologist and enjoys travelling to volcanoes. She became a Fellow of the Royal Society of Chemistry in 2013 and was named as one of the Royal Society of Chemistry's 175's Faces of Chemistry. In 2023 she was elected an Honorary Fellow of Downing College, Cambridge.

== Honours and awards ==
- 2025 – Royal Society of Chemistry Tilden Prize for Chemistry
- 2025 – Member of the Order of the British Empire, for services to chemistry
- 2022 – Fellow of the Royal Society
- 2020 – Corday–Morgan Prize
- 2018 – Journal of Polymer Science Innovation Award
- 2016 – Royal Society of Chemistry Gibson-Fawcett award
- 2014 – Royal Society of Chemistry and Society of Chemical Industry, McBain Medal
- 2013 – American Chemical Society Hermann Mark Young Scholar award
- 2012 – International Union of Pure and Applied Chemistry Samsung Young Polymer Scientist prize
- 2012 – Royal Society of Chemistry Hickinbottom Award
- 2008 – Royal Society of Chemistry Macro group UK Young Researcher medal
- 2007 – Royal Society of Chemistry Meldola Medal and Prize
