= Andrei Khlobystov =

British-Russian chemist

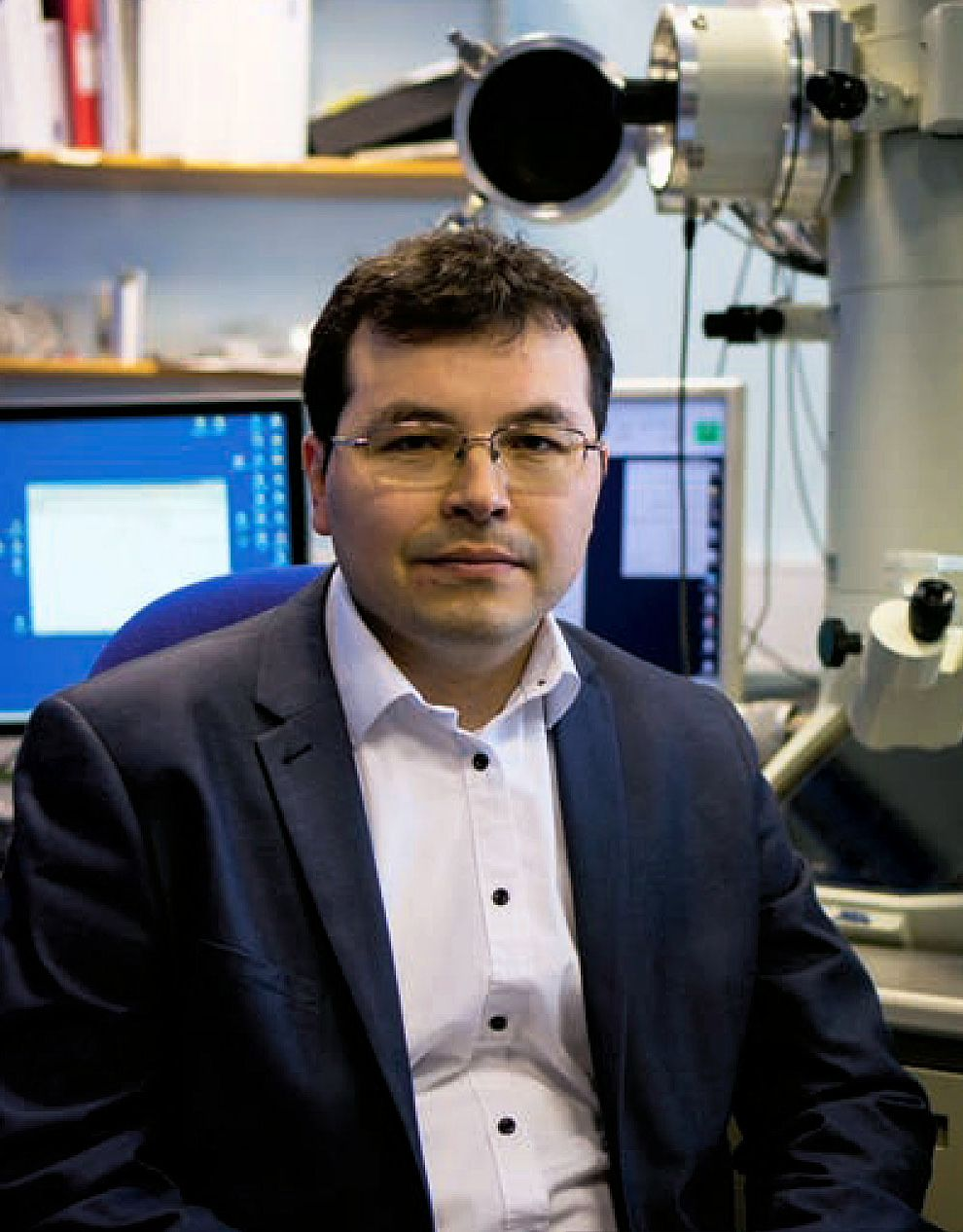
- Education: Moscow State University; University of Nottingham
- Scientific career
- Fields: Physical chemistry; Electrochemistry; Electron microscopy
- Workplaces: University of Oxford; University of Nottingham
- Doctoral advisor: Martin Schröder

Andrei Nikolaevich Khlobystov (Russian: Андрей Николаевич Хлобыстов) is a Russian-British scientist who is the Professor of Nanomaterials at the University of Nottingham. He serves as Director for Research for the School of Chemistry in the Faculty of Science and has received several awards during his career, including the European Young Investigator award and the Corday–Morgan Prize in 2015. Khlobystov is currently the Director and principal investigator of the Metal Atoms on Surfaces and Interfaces EPSRC Programme Grant.

== Early life and education ==
Andrei Nikolaevich Khlobystov was born in Soviet Russia. He obtained a Master of Science degree in chemistry from Moscow State University in 1997, and received a PhD in 2002 from the University of Nottingham under the supervision of Martin Schröder and Neil Champness.

== Career and research ==
Khlobystov worked as a post-doctoral researcher at the Department of Materials at the University of Oxford from 2002 until 2004 under Andrew Briggs. His work involved exploring the use of carbon nanotube as nanoscale containers for molecules. This allowed the application of transmission electron microscopy (TEM) to image structures of individual molecules, and to perform studies of their dynamic behaviour under electron beam, shedding light on both intermolecular interactions and the motion of molecules at the nanoscale. He was part of the team awarded a Guinness World Record for performing a chemical reaction inside carbon nanotubes.

In 2004, Khlobystov moved to the University of Nottingham as a Leverhulme Trust research fellow, founding the Nottingham Nanocarbon Group. The research of this group included demonstrating that nanoscale confinement can be used for novel chemical synthesis pathways. In 2005, the Nottingham Nanocarbon Group was awarded a European Young Investigator award and a Royal Society University Research Fellowship.

In 2008, the Nottingham Nanocarbon Group presented a display at the Royal Society's Summer Science Exhibition entitled "Wonder in carbon land: how do you hold a molecule?" This display featured information on utilising nanocages and nanotubes to control chemical reactions.

He was director of the Nanoscale and Microscale Research Centre (nmRC) at the University of Nottingham.

In 2016 Khlobystov was involved in the use of a Focused Ion Beam Scanning Electron Microscope (FIB-SEM) to etch a birthday message onto a corgi hair to commemorate Queen Elizabeth II's 90th birthday.

In 2020, the Nottingham Nanocarbon Group produced a video of the chemical bond between two metal atoms breaking and forming for the first time. This involved using the electron beam of a TEM to provide energy to break the chemical bond, while also capturing an image of the process. He promoted the name "ChemTEM" for this methodology, in collaboration with Ute Kaiser and Elena Besley.A similar methodology was developed by the group of Eiichi Nakamura, under the name SMART TEM.

Since 2021, Khlobystov has been involved in the MASI programme grant, investigating alternative methods to produce metal catalysts via methods such as solvent-free routes for electrochemical hydrogen production, ammonia synthesis and carbon dioxide reduction.
