= Andrew Dove =

British polymer chemist

- Born: Scunthorpe
- Education: Imperial College London (PhD, 2003); University of York (MChem, 1999)
- Scientific career
- Fields: Polymer chemistry
- Workplaces: University of Birmingham; University of Warwick
- Thesis: Novel beta-diketiminate complexes of tin, magnesium and zinc as initiators for the polymerisation of methyl methacrylate, lactide and other cyclic ester monomers (2003)
- Doctoral advisor: Vernon C. Gibson
- Website: https://www.dovegrouplab.com/group/andrew-p-dove/

Andrew Peter Dove FRSC is a British chemist and Professor of Sustainable Polymer Chemistry at the University of Birmingham. His research focus is on biodegradable polymers.

== Early life and education ==
Dove was born in Scunthorpe and raised in Spenborough and Heckmondwike.

Dove read chemistry at the University of York, graduating with an MChem in 1999, during which he undertook a placement year at BP Chemicals. He then studied for a PhD at Imperial College under Vernon C. Gibson, publishing in 2003 with the thesis Novel beta-diketiminate complexes of tin, magnesium and zinc as initiators for the polymerisation of methyl methacrylate, lactide and other cyclic ester monomers.

== Career ==
After his PhD, Dove and his wife moved to the United States to pursue postdoctoral research, she at IBM and he at Stanford University, under Robert Waymouth. After 15 months, funding ran out at Stanford, so Dove joined his wife at IBM, taking a postdoctoral contract at the US National Service Foundation-funded Center on Polymer Interfaces and Macromolecular Assemblies. It was here that Dove began working on organic catalysis, and when attending the ACS conferences of 2003 and 2004 he developed an interest in biodegradable polymers, especially their biomedical applications, which has shaped his work since.

In September 2005, Dove was appointed an RCUK Fellow at Warwick, working on nanotechnology. He became an assistant professor in September 2006, Associate Professor in September 2009 and Professor in June 2014.

Dove joined the University of Birmingham in either September 2017 or January 2018. While there, he founded the Birmingham Plastics Network, which facilitates interdisciplinary communication on issues relating to plastics.

In 2026, Dove joined the board of RECOUP, a plastic recycling company.

== Awards and honours ==
Dove was awarded the Norman Heatley Award of the Royal Society of Chemistry in 2018 for his work on the medical applications of biodegradable plastics. He also received the Gibson-Fawcett Award in 2014.

In 2022, Dove was awarded the RSC's Corday-Morgan Prize for his work on polymer stereochemistry.
