= Silvia Vignolini =

Italian physicist and materials scientist

- Born: January 1981 (age 45); Florence, Tuscany, Italy
- Education: University of Florence (PhD)
- Awards: Gibson-Fawcett Award (2018)
- Scientific career
- Fields: Photonic Structures in Plants; Metamaterials; Photonic crystals
- Workplaces: Max Planck Institute of Colloids and Interfaces; University of Cambridge; University College London
- Thesis: Sub-wavelength probing and modification of complex photonic structures (2010)
- Doctoral advisor: Diederik Wiersma
- Website: www.ch.cam.ac.uk/person/sv319

Silvia Vignolini (born January 1981) is an Italian physicist who is Director of research at the Max Planck Institute of Colloids and Interfaces and Professor of Chemistry and Bio-materials in the Yusuf Hamied Department of Chemistry at the University of Cambridge. Her research investigates natural photonics structures, the self-assembly of cellulose and light propagation through complex structures. She was awarded the KINGFA young investigator award by the American Chemical Society and the Gibson-Fawcett Award in 2018.

== Early life and education ==
Vignolini was born in Italy and grew up in Florence. She became interested in physics at high school, and remembers reading A Brief History of Time as a teenager. She studied materials physics at the University of Florence, which she graduated summa cum laude. She remained at the University of Florence for her doctoral research, where she studied photonic crystals at the European Laboratory for Non-Linear Spectroscopy supervised by Diederik Wiersma.

== Research and career ==
Vignolini's research interests are on photonic structures in plants, metamaterials and photonic crystals. After graduating from her PhD, she moved to the University of Cambridge, where she worked in the laboratory of Ullrich Steiner. Vignolini was appointed a lecturer at University College London (UCL) in 2013, but returned to the University of Cambridge in early 2014. In January 2023, Vignolini was appointed Director of research at the Max Planck Institute of Colloids and Interfaces in Germany while retaining her professor position at the University of Cambridge. Vignolini's research investigates structural coloration. colour that occurs due to the interaction of light with sub-micrometer scale structures as opposed to pigmentation. Structural colour originates from multi-layered materials and surface-level diffraction gratings. Her early work investigated coloration in Pollia condensata, a type of flowering plant that produces strong iridescence. The iridescence occurs due to Bragg reflection from cellulose microfibrils. These fibrils are stacked in a helicoidal-like architecture and the total thickness of the multi-layer structure changes throughout the surface of the Pollia condensata fruits. Vignolini has also studied the bright white shell of the Cyphochilus beetle, whose scales are so thin that they scatter light incredibly efficiently. She has shown that it is possible to tune the colour of self-assembled block copolymer thin films by changing the molecular structure. Vignolini developed the fabrication techniques to guide the self-assembly of the rigid-rod like cellulose nanocrystals and hydroxypropyl cellulose. Cellulose nanocrystals adopt a cholesteric stack-like structure when low concentrations cellulose nanocrystals are suspended in water and left to dry. As the water starts to evaporate, the concentration of cellulose increases, which results in the formation of a cholesteric lyotropic liquid crystalline phase. In this phase the twisted configuration repeats over a distance known as the pitch. The pitch determines the colour of light reflected by the cellulose nanocrystals (larger pitches reflect lower energy, longer wavelength light). Vignolini has shown that optical uniformity and material efficiency can be optimized by drying the cellulose nanocrystal suspension in sessile droplets under a thin oil layer. She has also shown that magnetic fields can be used to manipulate the orientation of the cholesteric domains. Vignolini has studied the reflectance spectrum at a range of different angles, which provides insight into the mechanisms of the self-assembly upon solvent evaporation. Vignolini also highlighted the important role played by bundles of cellulose nanocrystals leading to their chiral arrangement in cholesteric phases.

Vignolini has used her understanding of the interaction of light with complex natural structures to understand the interaction of light and anthocyanin vacuolar inclusions. This understanding can inform the design bionic materials that can achieve outstanding photosynthetic quantum efficiencies. In 2020, she was awarded a European Research Council (ERC) consolidator grant to study how organisms create symbiotic relationships to manage interactions with light.

=== Selected publications ===
Her publications include:

- Pointillist structural color in Pollia fruit
- Biomimetic layer-by-layer assembly of artificial nacre
- A 3D optical metamaterial made by self-assembly

=== Awards and honours ===
She was awarded the American Chemical Society (ACS) KINGFA young investigator award and the Gibson-Fawcett Award from the Royal Society of Chemistry (RSC) in 2018.
