= Helen H. Fielding =

Professor and Head of Physical Chemistry

Helen Fielding FRSC FInstP CPhys CChem
- Born: Helen H. Fielding
- Education: University of Cambridge (BA); University of Oxford (DPhil)
- Awards: Edward Harrison Memorial Prize (96); Marlow Award (01); Corday-Morgan Prize (05)
- Scientific career
- Fields: Physical chemistry
- Workplaces: University College London; King's College London; University of Amsterdam; National Physical Laboratory
- Thesis: The Stark effect in atomic and molecular Rydberg states (1992)
- Doctoral advisor: Timothy Softley
- Doctoral students: Jan R. R. Verlet
- Website: www.ucl.ac.uk/chemistry/professor-helen-h-fielding

Helen H. Fielding FRSC FInstP CPhys CChem is a Professor of physical chemistry at University College London (UCL). She focuses on ultrafast transient spectroscopy of protein chromophores and molecules. She was the first woman to win the Royal Society of Chemistry (RSC) Harrison-Meldola Memorial Prize (1996) and Marlow Award (2001).

== Education ==
Fielding studied the Natural Sciences Tripos at the University of Cambridge. She began her PhD at the University of Cambridge, working with Timothy Softley, but moved with him to the University of Oxford where they studied excited quantum states using photoelectron spectroscopy. She was awarded her Doctor of Philosophy degree in 1992.

== Career and research ==
Fielding was a scientist at the National Physical Laboratory from 1992 to 1993. In 1993 she joined the University of Amsterdam as a postdoctoral fellow, working with Ben van Linden van den Heuvell. Here she worked on Rydberg wave packets in coulombic and magnetic fields.

Fielding was appointed a lecturer at King's College London in 1994 after only 18 months of postdoctoral work. She was the first woman to be awarded the Harrison-Meldola Memorial Prize in 1996. She is interested in how to excite electron functions coherently, generating a wave packets with a localised probability distribution. Electron movement occurs on the attosecond timescale, making them impossible to image using conventional laser technology. Instead, Fielding employs femtosecond laser pulses to excite electrons to these highly excited Rydberg states. In these excited states, electrons behave both as a particle and a wave, and can be controlled using its wave-like characteristics. She has become one of few worldwide experts in the field. She is primarily interested in materials such as small organic chromophores and photoactivated peptides.

She made the first observation of a wave packet in a Rydberg molecule in 2000. This observation made her interested in coherent control, looking to exploit the phase of a rotating Rydberg molecule to manipulate the dynamics of chemical systems. She explored the decay pathways of the Rydberg molecule NO. Fielding used the wavelength and phase of the laser light to select whether NO decays via ionisation or dissociation. One decay route will be the result of constructive interference and the other the result of destructive interference. This study represented a breakthrough in the field; where light of a precise phase could be used to control molecular dynamics. She became interested in how the optical phase corresponds to the electronic and molecular phase, with a particular focus on the attosecond.

Fielding was made an EPSRC advanced research fellow in 2001, and was the first woman to be awarded the Royal Society of Chemistry Marlow Medal. In 2003 Fielding moved to University College London, where she leads a large laser laboratory. Her recent research has focussed on the dynamics of excited states formed during the absorption of ultraviolet light. She has studied the competition between internal conversion and electron detachment in protein chromophores.

She has worked extensively on ultrafast chemical biology in the gas phase. Fielding developed time-resolved photoelectron spectroscopy to study the relaxation dynamics of photoexcited molecules. She has investigated the intramolecular dynamics of vibrationally and electronically excited benzene, and demonstrated new electron transfer pathways in pyrrole dimers.

== Books ==
- 2009 Extreme Photonics & Applications.
- 2013 Ultrafast Phenomena in Molecular Sciences: Femtosecond Physics and Chemistry
- 2015 Tutorials in Molecular Reaction Dynamics

== Awards and honours ==
- 1996 Royal Society of Chemistry (RSC) Harrison-Meldola Memorial Prize`
- 2001 Engineering and Physical Sciences Research Council (EPSRC) Advanced Research Fellowship
- 2001 Royal Society of Chemistry (RSC) Marlow Award
- 2005 Royal Society of Chemistry (RSC) Corday-Morgan Prize
- 2008 Institute of Physics (IOP) Moseley Medal
- 2017 Royal Society Leverhulme Trust Senior Research Fellowship
- 2017 Royal Society of Chemistry (RSC) Award for Service

== Personal life ==
Fielding has three children.
