= Anna Slater =

British supramolecular chemist

- Education: University of Nottingham
- Scientific career
- Fields: Supramolecular chemistry Continuous flow chemistry
- Workplaces: University of Liverpool
- Doctoral advisor: Neil Champness

Anna Grace Slater (née Phillips) is a Royal Society University Research Fellow and Professor of Chemistry at the University of Liverpool.

== Education ==
Slater studied chemistry at the University of Nottingham, where she graduated in 2006. Slater completed a Ph.D. at the University of Nottingham under the supervision of Neil Champness in 2011.

== Career ==
In 2013 Slater joined the group of Andy Cooper at the University of Liverpool, where she worked on porous organic cages. She is interested in supramolecular chemistry. In 2015 she published "Function-led Design of New Porous Materials" in Science. She was shortlisted in the 2016 Women of the Future awards in the science category.

In 2016 she was appointed an EPSRC Dorothy Hodgkin Fellow. She was appointed as a Royal Society University Research Fellow in 2021, senior lecturer in 2021/22 and to a personal chair in 2022.

She looks to develop new functional materials through continuous flow chemistry at the University of Liverpool. Her half-a-million pound grant, "High Throughput Materials Development in Continuous Flow", is supported by the Royal Society. She took part in the Sci Annual Review Meeting, talking about new concepts in organic synthesis.

Slater was co-chair of the UK Research Staff Association (UKRSA). Slater led a project looking at how researchers took maternity, paternity, adoption, and parental leave. In 2016 she discussed barriers to mothers from pursuing academia.

In 2017, Slater took an exhibit titled "No Assembly Required" to a special joint Royal Society/Science Museum "Lates", part of a series of events open to adult members of the public that typically attracts over 4000 people. As part of the exhibit, Slater worked with Senior Lecturer and science poet Sam Illingworth to produce a series of poems written by the visitors using language from scientific papers in the field.

She is an Associate Editor of the Royal Society of Chemistry journal Molecular Systems Design & Engineering.

She is a former vice-chair, and a member of the advisory board, of WISC (Women in Supramolecular Chemistry), a group "supporting women and those who are marginalised to progress within supramolecular chemistry through creating a sense of community and kinship" and is one of the co-authors of the 2022 book Women in Supramolecular Chemistry: Collectively Crafting the Rhythms of Our Work and Lives in STEM (Policy Press: ISBN 978-1447362371).

== Personal life ==
Slater has two children, and has epilepsy. She was instrumental in setting up WISC's Disability/Chronic Illness/Neurodivergence Cluster and is "passionate about inclusion, diversity, and equity in HE [higher education]".

== Awards ==
- Harrison-Meldola Memorial Award (2023)
- Two Royal Society Fellowships (DHF 2016, URF 2021)
- Fellow of the Young Academy of Europe (2020)
- Associate Fellow of the Royal Commonwealth Society (2016)
