= Michel Che =

French chemist (1941–2019)

- Born: 29 December 1941; Lyon, France
- Died: 7 August 2019 (aged 77)
- Education: University of Lyon
- Known for: Molecular approach to heterogeneous catalysis
- Awards: Member of Academia Europaea and German National Academy of Sciences Leopoldina
- Scientific career
- Fields: Chemistry
- Institutions: Princeton University; Pierre and Marie Curie University, Paris
- Thesis: EPR study of titanium dioxide (1968)

Michel Che (29 December 1941 – 7 August 2019) was a French chemist who completed his doctorate (EPR study of titanium dioxide) in 1968 at the University of Lyon and studied as a postdoctoral fellow at Princeton University (1969–71). He was appointed professor at University of Paris VI: Pierre et Marie Curie in 1975 and Senior Member of the Institut Universitaire de France in 1995.

Che was born in Lyon, France. His work has led to around 400 publications in international journals. He was very active in the promotion and organisation of catalysis, being the President-Founder of EFCATS (European Federation of Catalysis Societies) with creation in 1993 of the cycle of the now famous biennial "EuropaCat" congresses, and President of IACS (International Association of Catalysis Societies) in 2000–04, culminating with the organisation and opening of the 13th International Congress on Catalysis in Paris in 2004.

His research activity has been largely devoted to catalysis processes involving gas–solid, liquid–solid and solid–solid interfaces. He has pioneered a molecular approach to heterogeneous catalysis, based on transition elements taken as probes, specific isotopes and physical techniques, which provided him with an original position in the field. His work has led to the emergence of interfacial coordination chemistry at the junction of colloidal, electro-, supramolecular, geo- and solid-state chemistries. His studies have largely contributed to improve understanding of the elementary processes involved in laboratory/industrial catalysis, and particularly water-mediated assemblies in catalyst preparation.

Michel Che's awards include: J. H. Van't Hoff (Netherlands), Japan Society for the Promotion of Science (Japan), M. Sklodowska-Curie and P. Curie (Poland), A. Joannides and P. Sue (France), Von Humboldt – Gay-Lussac (Germany). He is Doctor honoris causa of several universities (Cracow, Poland; Lisbon, Portugal; Bucharest, Romania) and member of several high-ranking academies (e.g. Academia Europaea, Deutsche Akademie der Naturforscher Leopoldina).

In 2014, he was awarded the Royal Society of Chemistry's Faraday Lectureship Prize.

Che died on 7 August 2019 after a short illness.

== Bibliography ==
- K. Dyrek, M. Che; Chem. Rev., 1997, 97, 305
- M. Anpo, M. Che; Advances Catal., 1999, 44, 119
- M. Che; Stud. Surf. Sci. Catal., 2000, 130A, 115
- F. Negrier, E. Marceau, M. Che, D. de Caro; Comptes Rendus Chimie, 2003, 6, 231
- M.L Bailly, G. Costentin, H. Lauron-Pernot, J.M. Krafft, M. Che; J. Phys. Chem. B, 2005, 109, 2404
- H. Carabineiro, R. Villaneau, X. Carrier, P. Herson, F. Lemos, F. R. Ribeiro, A. Proust, M. Che; Inorg. Chem., 2006, 45, 1915
- From Scheele and Berzelius to Müller: polyoxometalates (POMs) revisited and the "missing link" between the bottom up and top down approaches, P. Gouzerh, M. Che; L’Actualité Chimique, 2006, 298, 9
- C. Dablemont, C.. Hamaker, R. Thouvenot, Z. Sojka, M. Che, E.A. Mattaa, A. Proust; Chem. Eur. J., 2006, 12, 9150
