= Gibson–Fawcett Award =

Prize awarded by the Royal Society of Chemistry

The Gibson–Fawcett Award is awarded by the Royal Society of Chemistry every two years to recognise outstanding work in the field of materials chemistry. In particular, the emphasis is on the originality and independence of the work carried out. The prize was established in 2008 and is awarded by the Materials Chemistry Division Awards Committee. It can only be given to researchers under age 40. The award was discontinued in 2020.

== History ==
The award is named after Reginald Gibson and Eric Fawcett, eminent chemists who worked together with Anton Michels on the study of the role of high pressure in chemical reactions. This led to the discovery of polyethylene.

== Winners ==
Year	Winner	Institution	Reason
2010	Simon Clarke	University of Oxford	Chemistry of non-oxide and mixed anion solids as new functional materials
2012	Andrew Fogg	University of Liverpool	Time resolved X-ray diffraction to study the synthesis of new materials
2014	Andrew Dove	University of Warwick	New biodegradable materials for drug delivery and regenerative surgery
2016	Rachel O'Reilly	University of Warwick	Polymer synthesis, nanostructures and enzyme mimetic constructs
2018	Silvia Vignolini	University of Cambridge	Bio-materials and bio-mimetic photonic nanostructures
2020	Cinzia Casiraghi	University of Manchester	For the development of practical biocompatible inks made of 2D materials and their applications in the biomedical field and in printed electronics

== See also ==
- List of chemistry awards
