= Anthony Cheetham =

British materials scientist

Sir Anthony Cheetham FRS
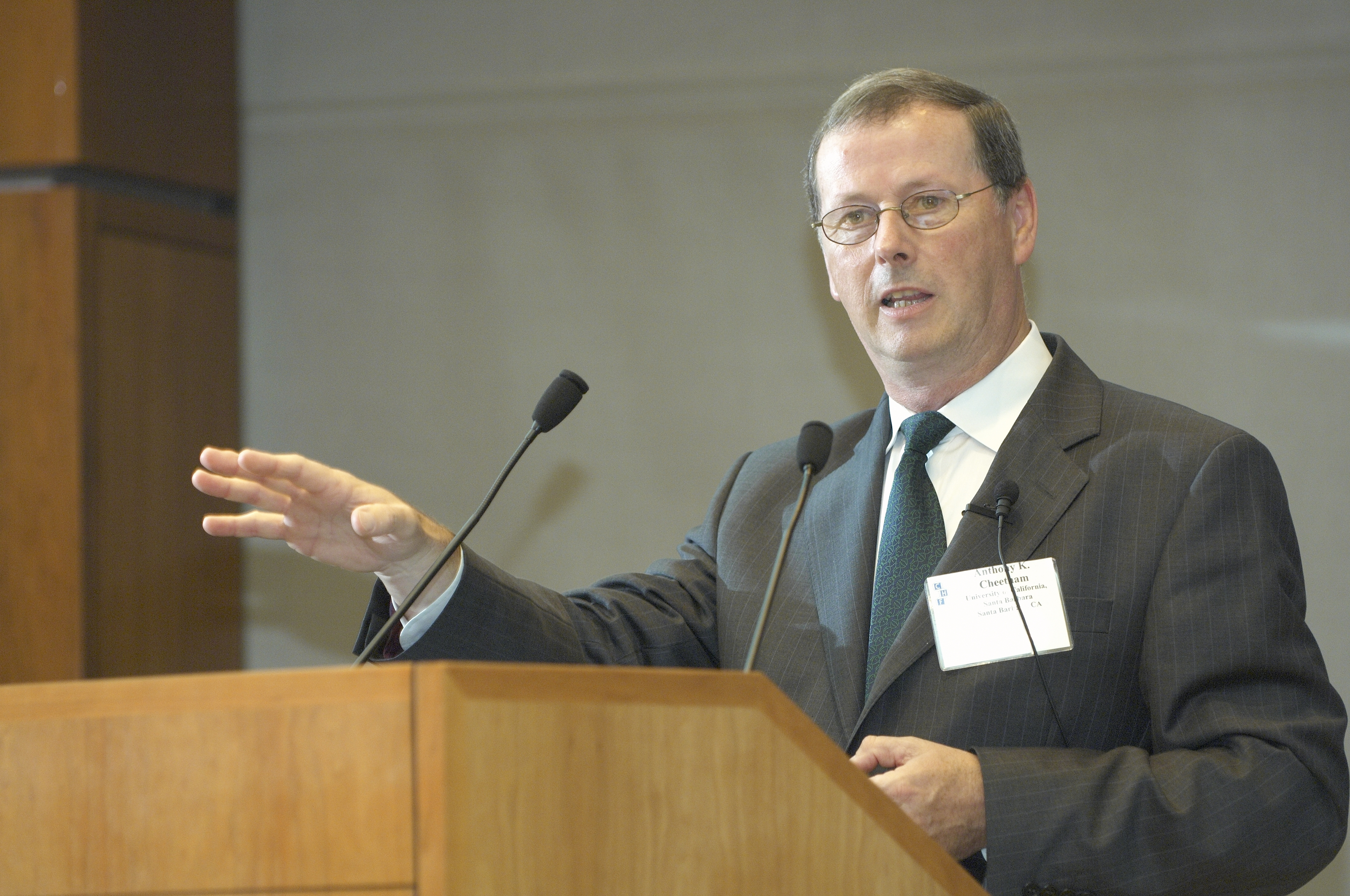
- Chemical Heritage Foundation, 2005
- Born: Anthony Kevin Cheetham; 16 November 1946 (age 79); Stockport, England
- Education: University of Oxford
- Scientific career
- Fields: Materials Chemistry
- Workplaces: University of Oxford; University of California, Santa Barbara; University of Cambridge; National University of Singapore
- Thesis: Structural Studies on Defect Compounds and Solid Solutions (1971)
- Doctoral students: Paul Attfield; Clare Grey; Matthew Rosseinsky; Russell E. Morris
- Website: materials.ucsb.edu/people/emeritus-and-research-faculty/anthony-cheetham

Sir Anthony Kevin Cheetham FRS (born 16 November 1946) is a British materials scientist. From 2012 to 2017 he was Vice-President and Treasurer of the Royal Society.

== Education ==
Cheetham was educated at Stockport Grammar School and read chemistry at St Catherine's College, Oxford, matriculating in 1965, and graduated with first class honours in 1969. He started his doctorate at Wadham College, Oxford in the same year, with a thesis on 'The Structures of some Non-stoichiometric Compounds'; his doctorate was awarded in 1972.

== Career and research ==
After completing his doctorate, Cheetham became a Junior Research Fellow at Lincoln College, Oxford. In 1974 he became a University Lecturer in Chemical Crystallography, and in 1990 he became Ad Hominem Reader in Inorganic Materials. Cheetham moved to the United States a year later to take up a position as Professor of Materials at the University of California, Santa Barbara, where he became the first director of the Materials Research Laboratory (MRL). In 2007, Cheetham moved back to the United Kingdom to become Goldsmiths' Professor of Materials Science at University of Cambridge, a position he held until October 2017. He is now a Distinguished Research Fellow at the Department of Materials Science at the University of Cambridge. He also holds a Distinguished Visiting Professorship at the National University of Singapore and a Research Professorship in the MRL at the University of California, Santa Barbara.

Cheetham's area of research is inorganic and hybrid materials, and involves their synthesis, characterization and applications. He has worked on the development of advanced methods for the chemical and structural characterization of polycrystalline materials and the application of these techniques to the study of zeolite catalysts, molecular sieves, and optical materials. His current interests are in the field of functional metal-organic frameworks and hybrid perovskites.

His former doctoral students include Paul Attfield, Clare Grey, Matthew Rosseinsky, and Russell E. Morris.

=== Honours and awards ===
- 1982 Corday-Morgan Medal and Prize of Royal Society of Chemistry
- 1988 Solid State Chemistry Award of the Royal Society
- 1994 Elected a Fellow of the Royal Society (FRS)
- 1996 RSC Structural Chemistry Award
- 1997 Chaire Internationale de Recherche "Blaise Pascal", Paris, France
- 1999 Elected a Fellow of the World Academy of Sciences (TWAS)
- 2001 Elected an Honorary Fellow of the Indian Academy of Sciences
- 2004 Somiya Award of the International Union of Materials Research Societies (IUMRS)
- 2006 Docteur Honoris Causa, Université de Versailles, France
- 2008 Cheetham Award Lecture, UC Santa Barbara
- 2011 Platinum Medal of the Institute of Materials, Minerals and Mining
- 2011 Elected a Member of the German National Academy of Sciences Leopoldina
- 2011 Raman Chair, Indian Academy of Sciences
- 2011 Honorary D.Sc., University of St. Andrews, Scotland
- 2011 Honorary D.Sc., Tumkur University, India
- 2012 Nyholm Prize for Inorganic Chemistry of the Royal Society of Chemistry.
- 2013 Elected a Member of the German National Academy of Engineering (acatech)
- 2014 Chemical Pioneer Award, American Institute of Chemists
- 2014 Elected a Member of the American Academy of Arts and Sciences
- 2015 Honorary D.Sc., University of Warwick, England
- 2017 Basolo Medal, Northwestern University, USA
- 2017 Elected an Honorary Fellow, Trinity College, University of Cambridge, England
- 2018 Elected an Honorary Fellow, Singapore National Academy of Science
- 2019 Elected a Foreign Fellow, Indian National Science Academy

Cheetham was knighted in the 2020 New Year Honours for services to materials chemistry, UK science and global outreach.
