= Sue Gibson (chemist) =

British research chemist (born 1960)

Sue Gibson OBE FRSC
- Born: Susan Elizabeth Thomas; 3 November 1960 (age 66)
- Education: Darwen Vale High School; University of Cambridge (BA); University of Oxford (DPhil)
- Spouse: Vernon C. Gibson (m. 1994)
- Awards: Rosalind Franklin Award (2003); Meldola Medal and Prize (1989)
- Scientific career
- Workplaces: ETH Zürich; Imperial College London; University of Warwick; King's College London
- Thesis: Transition metal promoted oxidation and reduction reactions
- Doctoral advisor: Stephen G. Davies
- Website: imperial.ac.uk/people/s.gibson

Susan Elizabeth, Lady Gibson OBE FRSC (née Thomas, 3 November 1960) is a British research chemist, Professor emerita at Imperial College London and Honorary Fellow of Sidney Sussex College Cambridge. Gibson is an expert in chemical synthesis and catalysis.

== Education ==
Gibson was educated at Darwen Vale High School and the University of Cambridge as an undergraduate student of Sidney Sussex College, Cambridge, where she studied the Natural Sciences Tripos. She completed postgraduate study at the University of Oxford as a student of New College, Oxford where she obtained a Doctor of Philosophy degree in Chemistry in 1984 for research supervised by Stephen G. Davies.

== Career and research ==
After her DPhil, Gibson spent a year at the ETH Zürich as a post-doctoral researcher. Her early research focused on using transition metal chemistry and its applications in organic synthesis.

The Gibson Group's work contributed to areas such as, carbonylation, enzymatic resolution, ligand design, amino acid and peptide synthesis, medicinal chemistry, macrocycle synthesis, asymmetric induction, dendrimer construction, linker technology and multi-component catalysis.

She began her independent research career at the University of Warwick in 1985 and moved to Imperial College London in 1990. Between 1998 and 2003 she held the Daniell Chair of Chemistry at King's College London, before returning to Imperial College London where she held a chair in Chemistry until her retirement in 2019; she was Director of the Graduate School from 2013 until her retirement. She was president of the Organic Division of the Royal Society of Chemistry between 2007 and 2010 and chaired the organisation's awards committee from 2011 to 2014.

=== Publications ===
Sue is the main author on over 140 publications, including a text book that has been translated into French and German.

=== Honours and awards ===
- 1990, Meldola Medal awarded from the Royal Society of Chemistry (RSC)
- 1993, Zeneca Award for Organic Chemistry from AstraZeneca
- 1997, Hickinbottom Fellowship from the Royal Society of Chemistry
- 1999, Novartis Chemistry Lectureship
- 2003, Inaugural winner of the Royal Society's Rosalind Franklin Award. She used the award to fund a series of UK lectureships for internationally renowned female chemists.
- 2013, Gibson was appointed an Officer of the Most Excellent Order of the British Empire (OBE) for services to Chemistry and Science Education in the 2013 New Year Honours
