= Timothy Softley =

British scientist

Timothy Softley FRS FRSC FInstP
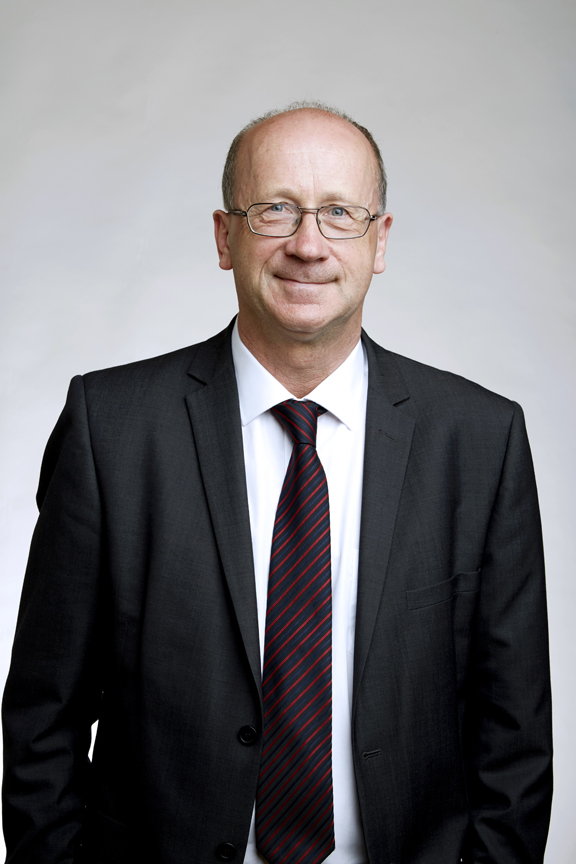
- Softley in 2018
- Education: The Hewett School
- Alma mater: University of Oxford; University of Southampton
- Awards: Corday Morgan Medal (1994); Royal Society University Research Fellowship; Harkness Fellowship
- Scientific career
- Fields: Chemical physics
- Workplaces: University of Birmingham; University of Oxford; Stanford University; University of Cambridge
- Thesis: Infrared predissociation spectroscopy of diatomic atoms (1984)
- Doctoral advisor: Alan Carrington
- Doctoral students: Helen H. Fielding; Frédéric Merkt
- Website: research.birmingham.ac.uk/portal/en/persons/timothy-softley(67763980-12d3-457a-91af-252836d2661f).html

Timothy Peter Softley is a British scientist who is Pro-vice-chancellor (PVC) for research and knowledge transfer at the University of Birmingham.

== Education ==
Softley was educated at The Hewett School in Norwich and Wadham College, Oxford. He moved to the University of Southampton to complete a PhD supervised by Alan Carrington in 1984. From 1986 to 1987 Softley worked as a post doctoral researcher in the group of Richard Zare at the Stanford University.

== Career and research ==
Softley is distinguished for his advances in two areas of chemical physics. First, the study of atoms and molecules in highly excited quantum states, known as Rydberg states. He has used his understanding of their properties, gained from laser spectroscopy and theory, to develop new applications including the study of model charge-transfer processes at solid-gas interfaces. Second, he has pioneered unique experiments utilising combinations of novel physical devices for making cold atoms, molecules and ions, for studying the kinetics and dynamics of chemical processes at ultralow temperatures – close to the absolute zero of temperature – where quantum effects determine the reactivity.

Much of his work was conducted in a twenty five-year period at Merton College, Oxford, where he served as head of the Department of Chemistry, University of Oxford from 2011 to 2015. His former doctoral students include Helen H. Fielding.

=== Awards and honours ===
Softley was elected a Fellow of the Royal Society (FRS) in 2018 for substantial contribution to the improvement of natural knowledge. He is also a Fellow of the Institute of Physics (FInstP) and a Fellow of the Royal Society of Chemistry (FRSC). He was also awarded a Royal Society University Research Fellow (URF) at the University of Cambridge, held a Harkness Fellowship at Stanford University and was awarded the Corday Morgan Medal in 1994.
