= John M. Newsam =

John Newsam is a British materials scientist, business innovator and entrepreneur, and adjunct professor at UC San Diego.

== Education ==
John Newsam received BA Hons and MA degrees in Chemistry from Oxford University and a DPhil in Solid State Chemistry at Oxford in 1980.

== Work ==
As a materials scientist, Newsam has authored over 170 scientific publications, on topics such as zeolites, crystallography, materials simulation and high throughput experimentation, and is an inventor on 9 issued US patents; he has lectured extensively, and been recognized by several awards, including the Corday-Morgan Medal, and by election as a Fellow of the American Association for the Advancement of Science.

As a business innovator and entrepreneur, Newsam has to date co-founded six companies: Tioga Research, Inc. (in 2011), Bio4Front, Inc. (in 2008), fqubed (in 2002, acquired by Nuvo Research in 2005), Integrated Discovery Sciences Corporation (in 2001, acquired by Bio and Gene in 2005), the Aktiengesellschaft (in 1999, acquired by BASF in 2008), and FreedomVoice Systems (in 1996).

== Awards and honors ==
Newsam has received many awards and honors both as an individual and together with colleagues, including:

- 2012: Fellow, American Association for the Advancement of Science
- 2009: Bronze Edison Award, Science & Medical Category (for Insight, with colleagues at Nuvo Research)
- 2003: Fellow, Royal Society of Chemistry
- 2001: Wissenschaftpreis 2001 des Stifterverbandes (together with the other co-founders of the Aktiengesellschaft)
- 1997: Award for Excellence in Catalysis (Catalysis Society of Metropolitan NY)
- 1989: Corday-Morgan Prize and Medal
- 1986: Sidhu Award (awarded by Pittsburgh Diffraction Society)
