= Józef R. Lewandowski =

Polish chemist

- Education: Amherst College; Massachusetts Institute of Technology
- Known for: Nuclear magnetic resonance spectroscopy
- Awards: Marlow Award (2016); Anatole Abragam Prize (2015)
- Scientific career
- Fields: Biophysics, structural biology, physical chemistry
- Workplaces: University of Warwick

Józef Romuald Lewandowski is a Polish chemist and Professor at the Chemistry Department of the University of Warwick. He is known for his research on the development of solid-state NMR methodology and NMR spectroscopy.

== Life and career ==
Lewandowski completed his high school education at the UWC Red Cross Nordic in Norway, having been selected by the United World Colleges' Polish national committee, graduating with an International Baccalaureate Diploma in 1997.

In 2002, he obtained his BA degree in chemistry from Amherst College. In 2008, he graduated in physical chemistry from the Massachusetts Institute of Technology. In 2011, he became assistant professor of Physical Chemistry of the University of Warwick, UK. From 2008 to 2011, he conducted postdoctoral research as a Marie Curie Fellow at the Centre de RMN à Très Haut Champs, Lyon, France. In 2019, he was promoted to the full professor status.

His main scientific interests include nuclear magnetic resonance spectroscopy. In 2015, he won the Anatole Abragam Prize conferred by the International Society of Magnetic Resonance while in 2016, he received the Marlow Award of the Royal Society of Chemistry.

== Selected publications ==
- Nuclear spin diffusion under fast magic-angle spinning in solid-state NMR (with Ben P. Tatman, William Trent Franks and Steven P. Brown, 2023)
- Molecular Basis for Acyl Carrier Protein-Ketoreductase Interaction in trans-Acyltransferase Polyketide Synthases (with Munro Passmore, Angelo Gallo and Matthew Jenner, 2021)
- Accelerating 15N and 13C R1 and R1ρ relaxation measurements by multiple pathway solid-state NMR experiments (with Jacqueline Tognetti, William Trent Franks and Angelo Gallo, 2021)
- Quantifying Microsecond Exchange in Large Protein Complexes with Accelerated Relaxation Dispersion Experiments in the Solid State (with Carl Öster and Simone Kosol, 2019)
- Protein–protein interactions in trans -AT polyketide synthases (with Simone Kosol, Matthew Jenner and Gregory L. Challis, 2018)

== See also ==
- List of Polish chemists
- Spectroscopy
- Physical chemistry
