= Andrew Goodwin (chemist) =

Australian scientist

Andrew Goodwin FRS
- Education: University of Sydney (BSc, Ph.D.); University of Cambridge (Ph.D.)
- Awards: Harrison-Meldola Memorial Prize (2010); Marlow Award (2013); Corday-Morgan Prize (2017); Blavatnik Award for Young Scientists (2018); Fellow of the Royal Society (2023); Faraday Discovery Fellowship (2025)
- Scientific career
- Fields: Materials chemistry
- Workplaces: University of Oxford
- Thesis: Negative thermal expansion behaviour in cyanide-bridged molecular framework materials (2003)
- Doctoral advisor: Cameron Kepert; Martin T. Dove
- Website: https://goodwingroupox.uk

Andrew L. Goodwin FRS is a university research professor and professor of materials chemistry at the University of Oxford.

== Education ==
Goodwin was educated at Sydney Boys High School and represented Australia at the International Chemistry Olympiad in 1996, winning a gold medal.

Goodwin earned a BSc in chemistry and pure mathematics at University of Sydney in 2002. In 2004 he completed a Ph.D. in inorganic chemistry at the University of Sydney under advisor Cameron Kepert. Goodwin earned a Ph.D. in mineral physics from the University of Cambridge in 2006 under advisor Martin T. Dove.

== Career ==
Goodwin was a junior research fellow at Trinity College, Cambridge from 2004 to 2009. Goodwin was a visiting fellow at the Australian National University in 2007.

=== At The University of Oxford ===
From 2008 to 2014, Goodwin was an EPSRC Career Acceleration Fellow and from September 2009 to July 2014, an associate professor in the department of chemistry at University of Oxford. From October to July 2018, Goodwin was a Tutorial Fellow in Chemistry at St Anne's College, Oxford and a College Lecturer in Inorganic Chemistry at Oriel College, Oxford. In July 2014, Goodwin became a professor of materials chemistry at University of Oxford and in 2018 he became a university research professor. He researches inorganic and solid-state chemistry. Goodwin's research has advanced the theoretical and applied studies of disorder and flexibility in materials. His laboratory applied diffraction and modelling techniques to study disordered materials and create new materials.

== Personal life ==
Goodwin identifies as gay and is in a same-sex marriage. He is an LGBT academic.

== Awards and honours ==
Goodwin won the 2010 Harrison-Meldola Memorial Prize for his work in materials with "negative thermal expansion and in the field of total scattering methods." In 2013, Goodwin won the Marlow Award for his "innovative studies of the physical chemistry and chemical physics of amorphous materials." He won the 2017 Corday-Morgan Prize for his "innovative studies of correlated disorder and its role in functional materials." Goodwin is a 2018 United Kingdom winner of the Blavatnik Award for Young Scientists.

Goodwin received two five-year grants from the European Research Council: an ERC Starting Grant through the 2011 call of the Seventh Framework Program and an ERC Advanced Grant through the 2017 call of the Eighth Framework Program (Horizon 2020).

Goodwin was elected a Fellow of the Royal Society (FRS) in 2023. In 2025, he received a Faraday Discovery Fellowship, awarded by the Royal Society.
