= Alan Walsh (physicist) =

British-Australian physicist

Sir Alan Walsh FAA FRS
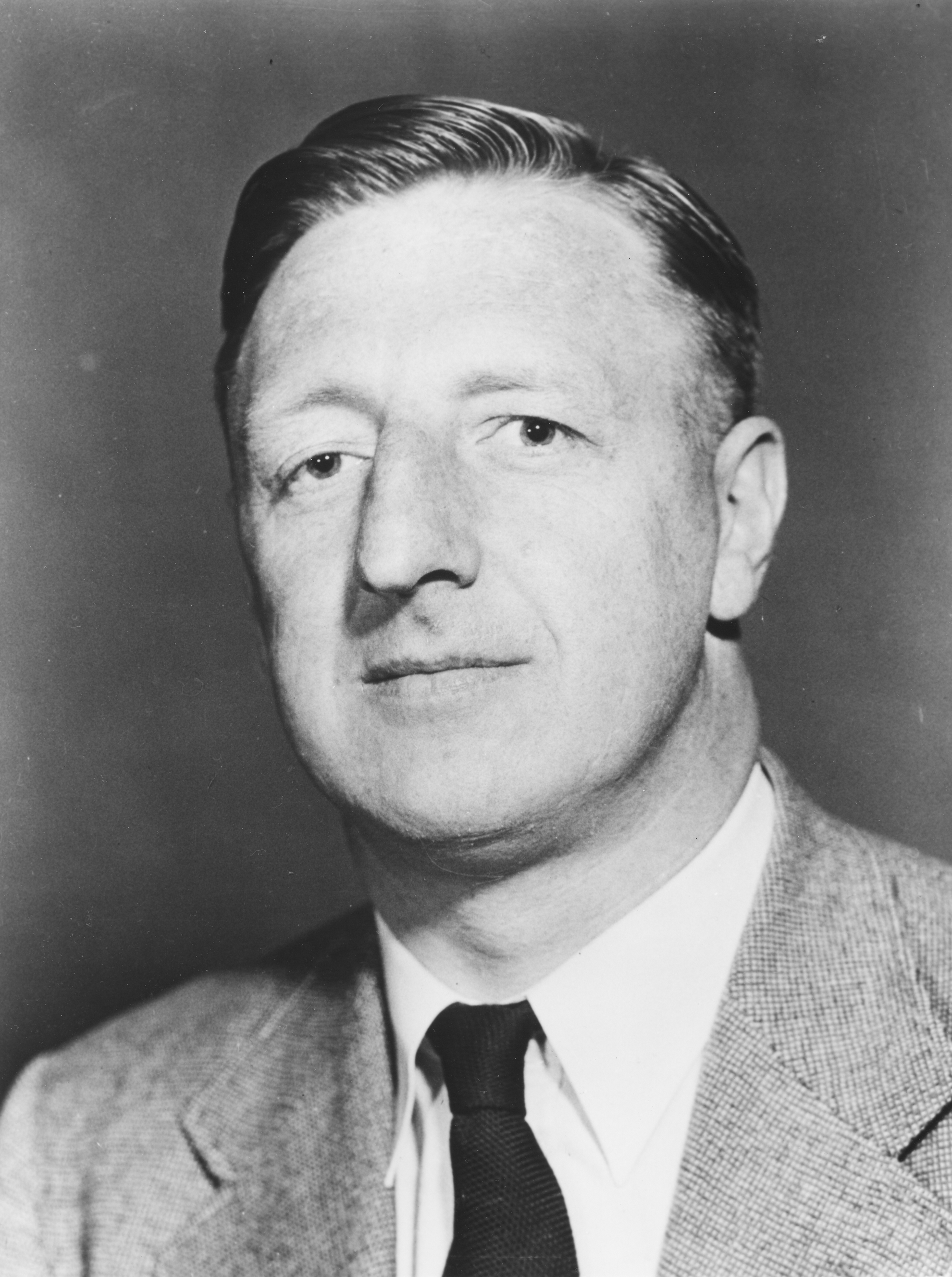
- Born: 19 December 1916; Hoddlesden, England
- Died: 3 August 1998 (aged 81); Melbourne, Victoria, Australia
- Education: University of Manchester
- Known for: Atomic absorption spectroscopy
- Spouse: Audrey Dale Hutchinson
- Children: Thomas Haworth; David Alan
- Scientific career
- Workplaces: BNF; CSIR (later CSIRO)

Sir Alan Walsh FAA FRS (19 December 1916 – 3 August 1998) was a British-Australian physicist, famous for being the originator and developer of a method of chemical analysis called atomic absorption spectroscopy.

== Biography ==
Walsh was born on 19 December 1916 and brought up in Hoddlesden, a small village about twenty miles from Manchester. He was the eldest son of Thomas Haworth Walsh, cotton mill manager, and Betsy Alice (née Robinson).

From the age of ten Walsh attended the local grammar school in the nearby town of Darwen, where he passed the Northern Universities Matriculation examination in 1933 and the Higher School Certificate examination in 1935. He then went to the University of Manchester to read physics. On graduation in 1938 he was also awarded a research scholarship, which he took up in the physics department, where he was particularly influenced by Henry Lipson’s suggestion that he work on the structure of β-carotene. Walsh spent one year at Manchester working on this, before moving to the physics section of the British Non-Ferrous Metals Research Association (BNF) in London, where he continued the theoretical work on the analysis. He was awarded an MSc (Tech) in 1944.

War began on the day Walsh joined BNF, and so he set himself the task of determining which metals were being used in enemy bombers that had been shot down, information that could help establish how the German war effort was advancing. He devised several methods for the rapid and accurate spectrographic analysis of alloys based on aluminium, copper or zinc. While developing the method he discovered that it could not always be transferred uniformly from one laboratory to another, so he set about devising a General Purpose Source Unit. This generated a stable and reproducible source of discharge, essential in spectrographic emission work. He then assisted Hilger & Watts Ltd to develop a commercial version.

In 1945 Alan applied for the post of Research Officer for Spectroscopic Investigations at the Council for Scientific and Industrial Research (CSIR) in Melbourne. After a long delay, he was offered the job in March 1946, but he first had to spend 3–4 months in Gordon Sutherland’s lab in Cambridge, to gain experience in the new field of infrared molecular spectroscopy. This led to a paper on the structure of phthiocerane, the hydrocarbon derived from phthiocerol, found in tubercle bacilli.

Walsh arrived at CSIR, via laboratory visits in the USA, in April 1947. He set about installing the first operating infrared spectrometer in Australia, a Perkin-Elmer Model 12B. He soon realised that its resolution was insufficient for any but the lightest molecules, so he devised and patented a double-pass system, which was licensed to Perkin-Elmer.

Walsh is probably best known for his development of atomic absorption spectroscopy as an analytical tool. This is a complex story, recounted in detail by Hannaford.

In late 1976 Walsh received a telex from the Royal Society telling him that he had been awarded a Royal Medal in recognition of “your distinguished contributions to emission and infrared spectroscopy and your origination of the atomic absorption method of quantitative analysis”. He retired from CSIRO on 5 January 1977, and in June was created a Knight Bachelor. In 1982 he was invited back to CSIRO as a senior research fellow.

== Honours, awards, affiliations and degrees ==
=== Medals and awards ===
- 1966 Britannica Australia Award
- 1969 Talanta Gold Medal
- 1969 Royal Society of Victoria Research Medal
- 1972 Maurice Hasler Award in Spectroscopy, Society for Applied Spectroscopy
- 1975 Kronland Medal, Czechoslovak Spectroscopic Society
- 1975 James Cook Medal, Royal Society of New South Wales
- 1976 Torbern Bergman Medal, Swedish Chemical Society
- 1976 Royal Medal, Royal Society
- 1977 Knight Bachelor
- 1978 John Scott Award, City of Philadelphia, USA
- 1980 Matthew Flinders Lecture and Medal, Australian Academy of Science
- 1982 Robert Boyle Medal, Royal Society of Chemistry (Inaugural Award)
- 1982 K.L. Sutherland Memorial Medal, Australian Academy of Technological Sciences (Inaugural Award)
- 1991 Colloquium Spectroscopicum Internationale Award for Major Scientific Contributions to Analytical Spectroscopy (Inaugural Award)

=== Academic affiliations ===
- 1958 Fellow, Australian Academy of Science
- 1969 Foreign Member, Royal Swedish Academy of Sciences
- 1969 Fellow, Royal Society
- 1969 Honorary Member, Society for Analytical Chemistry
- 1972 Honorary Fellow, Chemical Society
- 1975 Honorary Fellow, Royal Society of New Zealand
- 1979 Honorary Fellow, Australian Institute of Physics
- 1980 Honorary Fellow, Royal Society of Chemistry
- 1981 Honorary Member, Japan Society for Analytical Chemistry
- 1982 Fellow, Australian Academy of Technological Sciences

=== Honorary degrees ===
- 1970 DSc, Monash University
- 1986 DSc, University of Manchester

The Australian Institute of Physics Alan Walsh Medal, awarded for significant contributions in physics by an Australian industrial physicist, is named in his honour.

== Family ==
Soon after he emigrated to Australia Walsh met Sunderland-born nurse Audrey Dale Hutchinson, whom he married in 1949. They had two sons, Thomas Haworth and David Alan.

Alan Walsh died in Melbourne on 3 August 1998.
