= Neil Champness =

British inorganic chemist

- Education: University of Southampton (BSc 1989; PhD 1993)
- Scientific career
- Workplaces: University of Birmingham (2021-present); University of Nottingham (1995-2021)
- Thesis: Studies in ruthenium and osmium coordination chemistry (1993)
- Doctoral advisor: Bill Levason
- Doctoral students: Anna Slater; Andrei Khlobystov
- Website: neilchampnessgroup.com

Neil Champness FRSC is a British chemist currently serving as head of the School of Chemistry and Norman Haworth Professor of Chemistry at the University of Birmingham. His research focuses on supramolecular assembly and metal-organic frameworks.

== Education ==
Champness received a BSc in chemistry from the University of Southampton in 1989 and a PhD in 1993.

== Academic career ==
Following his PhD, Champness remained at Southampton to continue postdoctoral studies with Gill Reid. In 1995, Champness became a teaching fellow in inorganic chemistry at the University of Nottingham, becoming a reader in 2003 and gaining the Chair of Chemical Nanoscience in 2004. Champness moved to the University of Birmingham in 2021.

In 2019, Champness was appointed to the advisory board of the Cambridge Crystallographic Data Centre. Champness served as the Chairman of the Editorial Board of the Royal Society of Chemistry journal CrystEngComm from 2007-2010, having previously served as a member of the journal's Editorial Board from 2003-2006. He has been a member of the Royal Society of Chemistry Publishing Board since 2023. In 2020, Champness was appointed editor-in-chief of the organic crystalline materials section of Crystals, a journal of the Multidisciplinary Digital Publishing Institute.

Throughout his career Champness has given many public lectures including a Friday Discourse at the Royal Institution in 2015.

== Recognition ==
In 2013, Champness was elected a Fellow of the Learned Society of Wales, and in 2020 he was elected to Academia Europaea. In 2011 Champness was named as one of the top 100 most cited chemists of the previous decade. In 2026 Champness was appointed a Royal Commissioner to the Royal Commission for the Exhibition of 1851. Champness is also a Fellow of the Royal Society of Chemistry, the European Academy of Sciences and IUPAC.

Champness has received the following awards:

- RSC Surfaces and Interfaces Award (2016)
- Royal Society Wolfson Research Merit Award (2011)
- RSC Supramolecular Chemistry Award (2010)
- Corday-Morgan Prize (2006)

== Personal life ==
Champness is a supporter of Southampton FC.
