= Darwen Vale High School =

Location
- Blackburn Road; Darwen; Lancashire, BB3 0AL; England; 53.71506°N 2.4846°W

Information
- Type: Academy
- Established: 1894
- Local authority: Blackburn with Darwen
- Trust: Aldridge Education
- Department for Education URN: 141321 Tables
- Ofsted: Reports
- Principal: Matthew Little
- Gender: Coeducational
- Age: 11 to 16
- Website: http://www.darwenvale.com/

Darwen Vale High School is a coeducational secondary school located in Darwen in the English county of Lancashire. The school converted to academy status in 2014 and is part of the Aldridge Education multi-academy trust.

Darwen Vale High School specialises in dance, STEM and engineering, and works with a number of local businesses including the Lowry and BAES Systems. These specialist areas are reflected in the facilities available in the new Blackburn Road site.

== History ==
The school was established on Union Street, Darwen in 1894 as Darwen Higher Grade School, and was renamed Darwen Secondary School in 1908. In 1929 it became Darwen Grammar School, and relocated to the present site on Blackburn Road in 1938. Following a reorganisation of education in the area in 1972, the school became comprehensive and was renamed Darwen Vale High School.

The school temporarily relocated to the former Darwen Moorland High School site whilst a new build was completed on the Blackburn Road site. The new build was designed by John McAslan, and the original school facade was incorporated into the new build. The school relocated back to the Blackburn Road site in 2012.

== Notable former pupils ==
=== Darwen Grammar School ===
- Norman Aspin, diplomat
- Alan Walsh, physicist

=== Darwen Vale High School ===
- Louis Almond, former footballer for Blackpool, Barrow and Tranmere Rovers, currently playing for Ashton United
- Sue Gibson, professor of Chemistry at Imperial College London
