= Paul Attfield =

British academic

Paul Attfield FRS FRSE FRSC
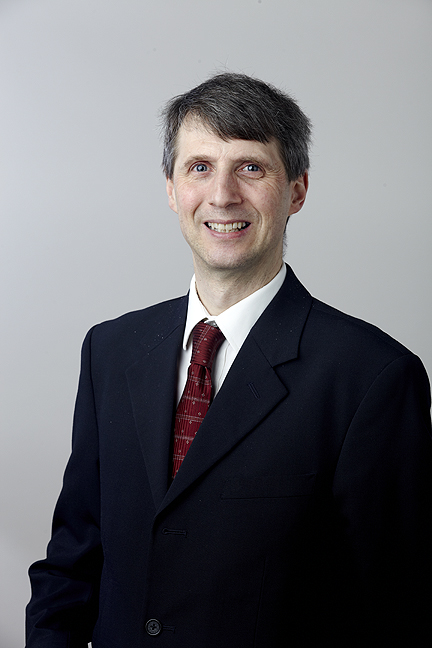
- Attfield in 2015
- Born: John Paul Attfield; 27 July 1962 (age 64); Birmingham
- Education: Durham Johnston School; University of Oxford
- Awards: Meldola Medal and Prize (1991); Corday-Morgan Prize (1998); Peter Day award (2013)
- Scientific career
- Fields: Magnetism; Superconductivity; High Pressure Synthesis; Materials Chemistry
- Workplaces: University of Edinburgh; University of Cambridge
- Thesis: The structural and magnetic properties of some transition metal compounds (1987)
- Doctoral advisor: Anthony Cheetham; Peter Battle
- Website: www.csec.ed.ac.uk/members/prof-j-paul-attfield

John Paul Attfield (born 1962) is a British chemist who is Professor of Materials science in the School of Chemistry at the University of Edinburgh and Director of the Centre for Science at Extreme Conditions (CSEC).

== Education ==
Attfield was educated at Durham Johnston School in Durham, England and the University of Oxford where he was a student at Magdalen College, Oxford. He was awarded a Bachelor of Arts degree in chemistry followed by a Doctor of Philosophy degree in 1987 for his work on chemical crystallography supervised by Anthony Cheetham and Peter Battle.

== Career and research ==
Attfield was appointed a lecturer, and subsequently a Reader at the University of Cambridge from 1991 to 2003. Attfield's research focuses on synthesis, structural studies, and property measurements for electronic materials such as transition metal oxides. His research has been funded by the Engineering and Physical Sciences Research Council (EPSRC). Attfield has made significant contributions to the study of the Verwey transition in magnetite, solving its charge ordering properties.

Paul Attfield has made distinctive contributions to the experimental understanding of structure in the solid-state, in particular pioneering the use of resonant X-ray scattering to study cation and valence ordering effects and characterising charge-order in strongly correlated systems such as magnetite. He introduced the cation-size variance as a concept to rationalise and predict disorder effects, with a substantial impact on the study and preparation of technologically important materials. He has synthesised and characterised new materials with novel electronic properties, including high-Tc superconductivity, colossal magnetoresistance, and negative thermal expansion, including new developments in chemical synthesis.

=== Awards and honours ===
Attfield was awarded the Meldola Medal and Prize by the Royal Society of Chemistry (RSC) in 1991; the Corday-Morgan Medal of the RSC in 1998; and the Peter Day Award in 2013. He was elected a Fellow of the Royal Society (FRS) in 2014 for “substantial contribution to the improvement of natural knowledge”. In 2016, Attield was awarded a Daiwa Adrian Prize, recognizing his work as part of a British-Japanese scientific collaboration, and in 2022 he received the John B. Goodenough Award for materials chemistry from the Royal Chemistry Society, specifically "For transformative discoveries of new materials from high pressure synthesis and of novel electronic phenomena in solids."
