= Graham Hutchings =

British chemist

Graham John Hutchings is a British chemist, Professor for Research at Cardiff University.

He gained his BSc in 1972 at University College London, a PhD from University College in 1975 in Biological Chemistry and a DSc from the University of London in 2002 for his work on heterogeneous catalysis.

His scientific career has included being Scientific Officer (1975–79) and Research and Production Manager (1979-1981) at ICI Petrochemicals and Chief Scientific Officer at AE & CI (African Explosives and Chemical Industries), Modderfontein, South Africa (1981–84). He was then in turn Lecturer, Senior Lecturer and Professor in the Department of Chemistry, University of the Witwatersrand (1984–87) followed by Assistant Director (1984–94) and Professor and Deputy Director (1994–97) at the Leverhulme Centre for Innovative Catalysis, University of Liverpool.

He was then Professor of Physical Chemistry, Cardiff University (1997) and Head of School for Chemistry (1997–2006) and Professor of Physical Chemistry and Director of the Cardiff Catalysis Institute (2008-2019).

From 2010 until 2013 he was chairman of SCORE, (Science Community Representing Education), Director of the UK Catalysis Hub, 2012-2017 and 2018-2019, and President of the Faraday Division of the RSC 2012-2015. In 2016, Hutchings became the first Regius Professor of Chemistry of the University on the newly founded chair in Cardiff.

== Honours and awards ==
- 2009 Surfaces and Interfaces Award
- 2009 Fellow of the Royal Society
- 2013 Davy Medal of Royal Society "for the discovery of catalysis by gold and for his seminal contributions to this new field of chemistry"
- 2017 ENI Award for Advanced Environmental Solutions
- 2018 Faraday Lectureship Prize of the Royal Society of Chemistry
- 2018 CBE in the Queen's Birthday Honours
