= Faraday Lectureship Prize =

Award granted for contributions to chemistry

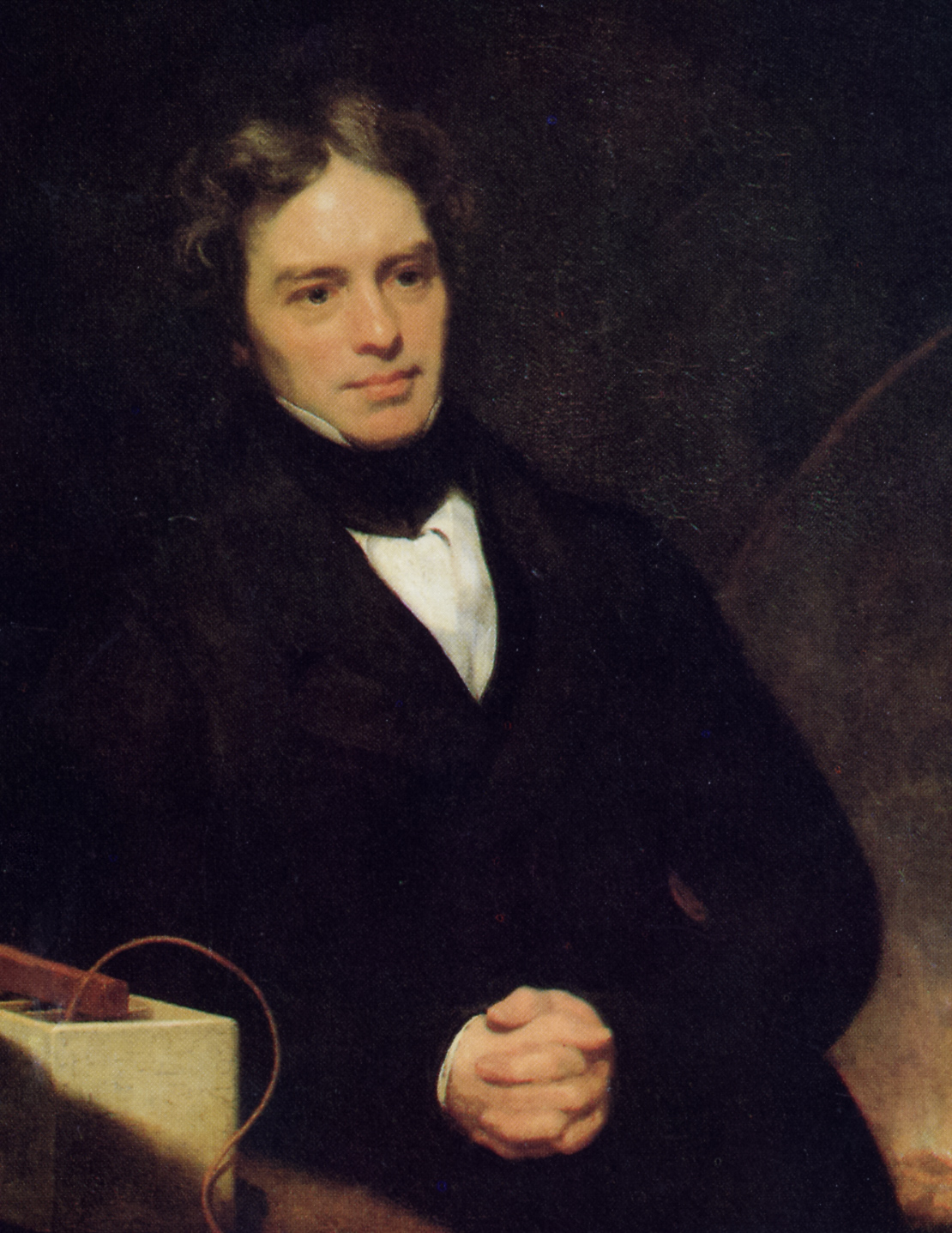
Michael Faraday (1791–1867), after whom the lectureship is named.

The Faraday Lectureship Prize, previously known simply as the Faraday Lectureship, is awarded once every two years (approximately) by the Royal Society of Chemistry for "exceptional contributions to physical or theoretical chemistry". Named after Michael Faraday, the first Faraday Lecture was given in 1869, two years after Faraday's death, by Jean-Baptiste Dumas. As of 2009, the prize was worth £5000, with the recipient also receiving a medal and a certificate. As the name suggests, the recipient also gives a public lecture describing their work.

== Winners ==
Source: RSC

- 1869: Jean-Baptiste Dumas
- 1872: Stanislao Cannizzaro
- 1875: August Wilhelm von Hofmann
- 1879: Charles-Adolphe Wurtz
- 1881: Hermann von Helmholtz
- 1889: Dmitri Mendeleev
- 1895: John Strutt, 3rd Baron Rayleigh
- 1904: Wilhelm Ostwald
- 1911: Theodore William Richards
- 1907: Hermann Emil Fischer
- 1914: Svante Arrhenius
- 1924: Robert Andrews Millikan
- 1927: Richard Willstätter
- 1930: Niels Bohr
- 1933: Peter Debye
- 1936: Lord Rutherford of Nelson
- 1939: Irving Langmuir
- 1947: Sir Robert Robinson
- 1950: George de Hevesy
- 1953: Sir Cyril Hinshelwood
- 1956: Otto Hahn
- 1958: Leopold Ružička
- 1961: Sir Christopher Ingold
- 1965: Ronald George Wreyford Norrish
- 1968: Charles Coulson
- 1970: Gerhard Herzberg
- 1974: Sir Frederick Dainton
- 1977: Manfred Eigen
- 1980: Sir George Porter
- 1983: John Shipley Rowlinson
- 1986: Alan Carrington
- 1989: John Meurig Thomas
- 1992: Yuan T. Lee
- 1995: William Klemperer
- 1998: A. David Buckingham
- 2001: Richard Zare
- 2004: Alexander Pines
- 2007: Gerhard Ertl
- 2010: John Polanyi
- 2012: Richard Saykally
- 2014: Michel Che
- 2016: Graham Fleming
- 2018: Graham Hutchings
- 2020: Richard Catlow
- 2021: Laura Gagliardi
- 2022: Michael Wasielewski
- 2023: Enrique Iglesia
- 2024: Jenny Nelson

== See also ==
- List of chemistry awards
