= Polly Arnold =

British chemist

Polly Arnold OBE FRS FRSE FRSC
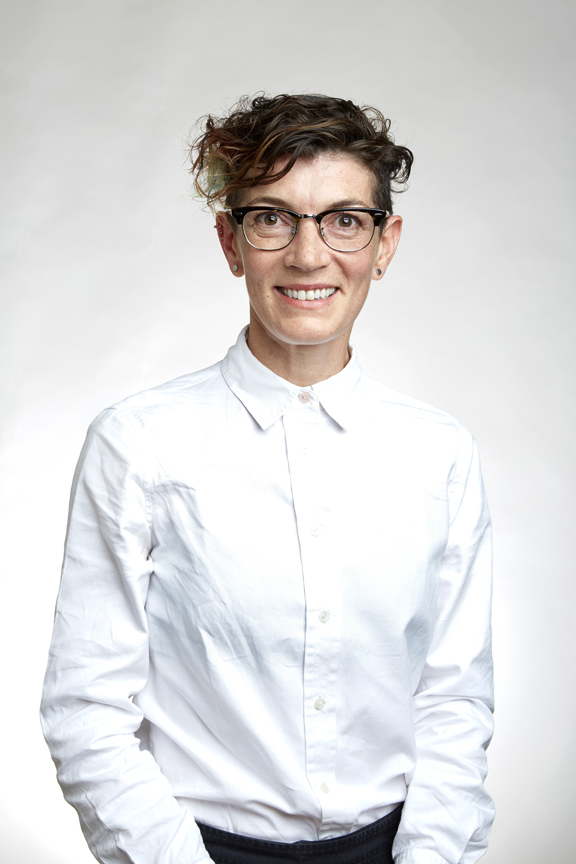
- Arnold in 2018
- Born: Polly Louise Arnold; 24 July 1972 (age 54)
- Education: Notting Hill and Ealing High School; Westminster School; University of Oxford (BA); University of Sussex (DPhil)
- Awards: Suffrage Science award (2015); Rosalind Franklin Award (2012); Corday-Morgan Prize (2012); Fulbright scholar
- Scientific career
- Fields: Chemistry
- Workplaces: Lawrence Berkeley National Laboratory; University of California, Berkeley; University of Nottingham; University of Edinburgh; Massachusetts Institute of Technology
- Thesis: Low valent and low co-ordinate complexes of transition metals and lanthanides (1997)
- Doctoral advisor: Geoffrey Cloke
- Website: chemistry.berkeley.edu/faculty/chem/polly-arnold

Polly Louise Arnold (born 24 July 1972) is a British chemist who is director of the chemical sciences division at Lawrence Berkeley National Laboratory and professor of chemistry at the University of California, Berkeley. She previously held the Crum Brown chair in the School of Chemistry, University of Edinburgh from 2007 to 2019 and an Engineering and Physical Sciences Research Council (EPSRC) career fellowship.

== Education ==
Arnold was educated at Notting Hill and Ealing High School and Westminster School. She studied chemistry at Brasenose College, Oxford (BA) and worked with Dermot O'Hare and Matthew Rosseinsky. She moved to the University of Sussex for postgraduate research, where her Doctor of Philosophy degree was supervised by Geoffrey Cloke.

== Research and career ==
Arnold's research focuses on exploratory synthetic chemistry, particularly in making complexes that exhibit unusual structure-bonding in early transition metal, and lanthanide and actinide chemistry. Such knowledge underpins the discovery of catalysts and our understanding of the behaviour of nuclear waste.

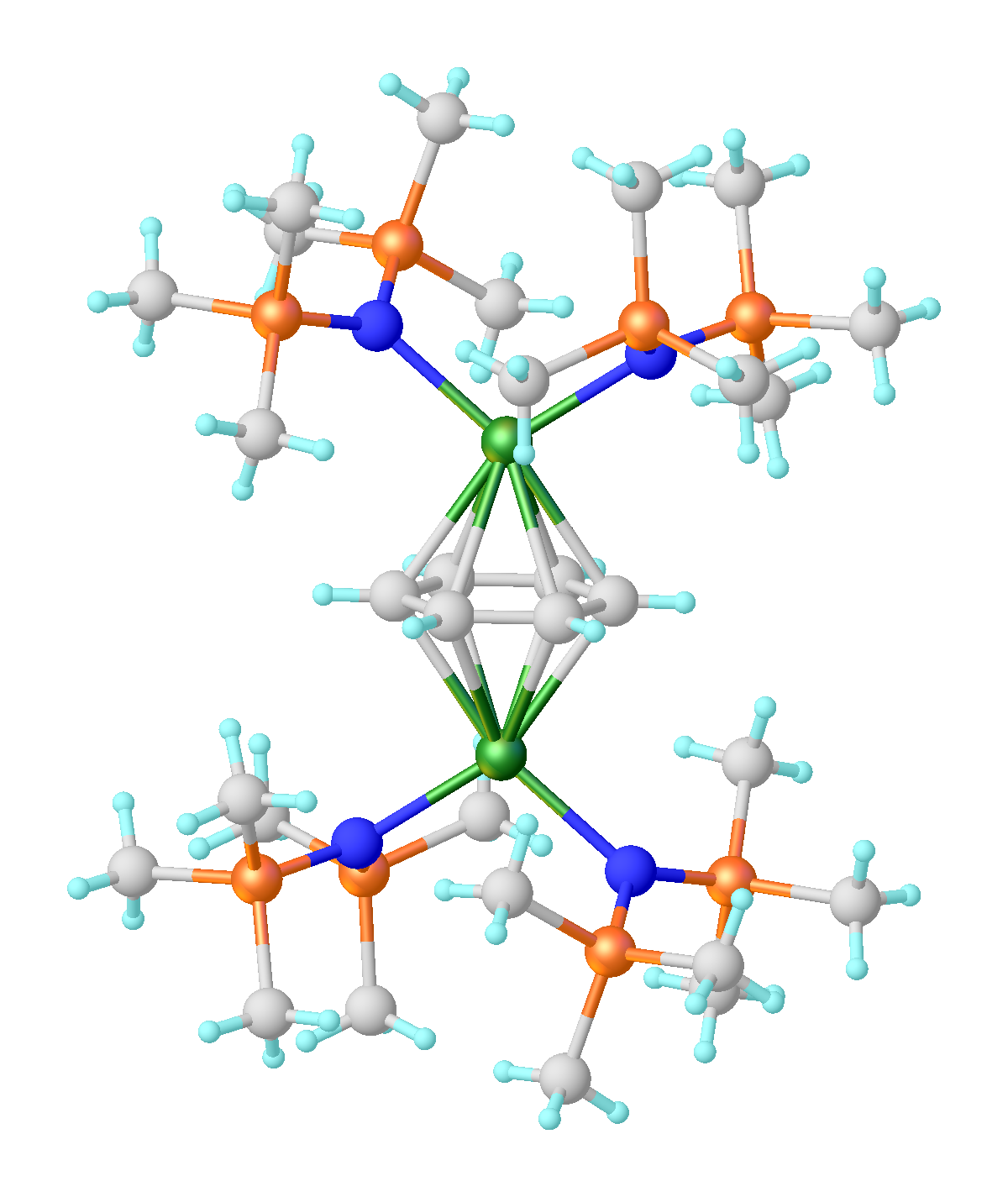
Structure of C_{6}H_{6}[U(Ntms_{2})_{2}]_{2} from Arnold's lab

Arnold was a Fulbright Program postdoctoral fellow at Massachusetts Institute of Technology (MIT), where she worked with Christopher C. Cummins before returning to the UK to a lectureship in 1999. Her research is focused on the design and synthesis of highly reactive f-block complexes that can activate inert small molecules such as carbon oxides, dinitrogen, and hydrocarbons, and that can provide fundamental information on structure and bonding at the bottom of the periodic table.

Arnold has given lectures around the world, advised the government and industry, and appears regularly on mainstream media and social media to discuss the importance and benefits of diversity in the science, technology, engineering, and mathematics (STEM) workforce.

=== Awards and honours ===
Arnold was awarded the Rosalind Franklin Award in 2012 for her scientific achievements, and her suitability as a role model and proposal to promote women in science, technology, engineering, and mathematics (STEM). This award was used to fund the creation of the documentary film A Chemical Imbalance, where she is the executive producer. That same year, she was also awarded the Royal Society of Chemistry's Corday-Morgan Prize for her "outstanding contributions to the application of organometallic uranium chemistry to small molecule activation", and elected a Fellow of the Royal Society of Edinburgh (FRSE). In 2015, Arnold was awarded an Engineering and Physical Sciences Suffrage Science award.

She was appointed Officer of the Order of the British Empire (OBE) in the 2017 Birthday Honours for services to chemistry and women in STEM.

In 2018, she was awarded the Royal Society of Chemistry (RSC) Sir Geoffrey Wilkinson award for her work on transuranic organometallic chemistry, and is so far, the only woman to have been awarded this award since its inception in 1999. She was elected a Fellow of the Royal Society (FRS) in 2018 for substantial contributions to the improvement of natural knowledge. She was elected a Fellow of the American Academy of Arts and Sciences in 2024.
