= Bourke–Liversidge Award =

The Bourke–Liversidge Award was created in 2020 by the merger of the Bourke Award with the Liversidge Award. The Bourke–Liversidge Award is awarded by the Royal Society of Chemistry.

== Winners ==
As of 2025, there have been 4 winners of the Bourke–Liversidge Award:

Year	Recipient
2024	Scott Habershon
2023	Jan R. R. Verlet
2022	Vasilios Stavros
2021	Sharon Ashbrook
