= Igor Larrosa =

Spanish chemist

- Born: Igor Guerrero Larrosa; 1976 or 1977 (age 49–50); Barcelona, Spain
- Education: University of Barcelona (Bsc., MSc., PhD)
- Known for: Organic synthesis Catalysis
- Awards: Corday-Morgan Prize (2019); Blavatnik Awards (UK) Finalist (2019); Science & Engineering Research Performance (2012); Thieme Chemistry Journals Award (2009)
- Scientific career
- Fields: Organic Chemistry; Inorganic Chemistry
- Workplaces: University of Manchester
- Thesis: Reacciones de c-glicosidación estereoselectivas con enolatos de titanio quirales. Síntesis del fragmento c1-c9 de la salinomicina (2004)
- Doctoral advisors: Dr. Fèlix Urpí Tubella; Dr. Pedro Romea García

Igor Guerrero Larrosa is a Spanish chemist and a professor in the Department of Chemistry at The University of Manchester. His research in general is based on organic chemistry and inorganic chemistry, specifically on the areas of inorganic catalysis and organic synthesis including the application to C-H and decarboxylative activation.

== Education ==
Larrosa completed his Bachelor of Science degree in 1999 at University of Barcelona. He continued to read for his Master of Science and Doctor of Philosophy at University of Barcelona under the supervision of Dr. Fèlix Urpí Tubella and Dr. Pedro Romea García and successfully completed his PhD in 2004.

== Research and career ==
Upon completing his PhD, Larrosa received a three months fellowship from the Ministry of Education and Science, Spain to work with Erick M. Carreira at ETH Zürich before moving to Imperial College London for a postdoctoral research with Prof. Anthony Barrett. He then moved to Queen Mary University of London as a lecturer and was promoted to the position of senior lecturer and reader in 2011 and 2012 respectively. In 2014, he moved to the University of Manchester as a professor of organic chemistry.

Larrosa's research in general is based on organic chemistry and inorganic chemistry, specifically on the areas of inorganic catalysis and organic synthesis including the application to C-H and decarboxylative activation.

Larrosa received an EPSRC in 2011 and currently holds an EPSRC Advanced Grant. He is also a member of 2D, a research programme in the aim of bringing together a team of multi-disciplinary researchers as well as world-leaders in G2D research.

=== Notable work ===
Larrosa is considered as one of the world's leading researcher's in Carbon–hydrogen bond activation. C – H bonds in organic compounds are particularly un-reactive due to the strong bonds between the carbon and hydrogen atoms and such bond activation would increase the reactivity and therefore enable the potential development of novel organic compounds. Larrosa's research has showed how transition metal catalysis maybe used to achieve C – H bond activation, and for his efforts in the field, was awarded the Corday-Morgan Prize and was a finalist at the Blavatnik Awards (UK) in 2019. The published research also have shown the enhanced regioselectivity and stereoselectivity in these catalysis processes, which is generally difficult to be achieved in this field. Apart from research based on C – H bond activation, Larrosa has also published several research on decarboxylation and arylation reactions.

=== Awards and nominations ===
- Corday–Morgan Prize (2019)
- Blavatnik Awards (UK) Finalist (2019)
- Science & Engineering Research Performance(2012)
- Thieme Chemistry Journals Award (2009)

== Major publications ==
- Larrosa, Igor; Righi, Marika; Cornella, Josep (2011). "Carboxylic Acids as Traceless Directing Groups for Formal meta -Selective Direct Arylation". Angew. Chem. Int. Ed. 50 (40): 9429–9432. Bibcode:2011ACIE...50.9429C. doi:10.1002/anie.201103720. PMID 21948440.
- Larrosa, Igor; Boorman, Tanya C. (2011). "Gold-mediated C–H bond functionalisation". Chem. Soc. Rev. 40 (4): 1910–1925. doi:10.1039/C0CS00098A. PMID 21103517.
- Larrosa, Igor; Lu, Pengfei; Josep (2009). "Intermolecular Decarboxylative Direct C-3 Arylation of Indoles with Benzoic Acids". Org. Lett. 11 (23): 5506–5509. doi:10.1021/ol902304n. PMID 19877661.
- Larrosa, Igor; Lebrasseur, Nathalie (2008). "Room Temperature and Phosphine Free Palladium Catalyzed Direct C-2 Arylation of Indoles". J. Am. Chem. Soc. 130 (10): 2926–2927. Bibcode:2008JAChS.130.2926L. doi:10.1021/ja710731a. PMID 18278918.
- Larrosa, Igor; Cornella, Josep (2012). "Decarboxylative Carbon-Carbon Bond-Forming Transformations of (Hetero)aromatic Carboxylic Acids" (PDF). Synthesis. 44 (5): 5110–5148. doi:10.1055/s-0031-1289686.
