= Geoffrey Cloke =

British chemist

Geoffrey Cloke FRS
- Born: Frederick Geoffrey Nethersole Cloke; 12 April 1953 (age 73)
- Scientific career
- Fields: Chemistry
- Workplaces: University of Sussex
- Thesis: The reactions of metal vapours and related species (1978)
- Doctoral students: Polly Arnold
- Website: www.sussex.ac.uk/profiles/510

(Frederick) Geoffrey Nethersole Cloke FRS is a British chemist, and professor at University of Sussex.

== Honours and awards ==
- 1988 Corday-Morgan Prize of the Royal Institute of Chemistry
- 1998 Tilden Prize of the Royal Institute of Chemistry
- 2007 Elected Fellow of the Royal Society

== Publications ==
- Owen T. Summerscales, F. Geoffrey N. Cloke, "The organometallic chemistry of pentalene", Coordination Chemistry Reviews, Volume 250, Issues 9–10, May 2006, Pages 1122–1140
- Larch, CP., Cloke, FGN. & Hitchcock, PB. (2008). 'Activation and reduction of diethyl ether by low valent uranium: formation of the trimetallic, mixed valence uranium oxo species [U(CpRR')(mu-I)2]3(mu3-O) (CpRR' = C5Me5, C5Me4H, C5H4SiMe3)'. Chemical Communications, no. 1, pp. 82–84.
