= Jan R. R. Verlet =

Belgian-British chemist

Jan R. R. Verlet FRSC
- Born: 6 June 1977 (age 49); Leuven, Belgium
- Education: King's College London (MSci) (PhD)
- Awards: Corday-Morgan Prize (2021); Bourke-Liversidge Award (2023)
- Scientific career
- Fields: Physical chemistry
- Workplaces: Durham University; J. Heyrovský Institute of Physical Chemistry
- Thesis: Controlling electronic and molecular dynamics using optical pulse sequences (2003)
- Doctoral advisor: Helen H. Fielding
- Doctoral students: Connor Clarke

Jan Raf Rogier Verlet FRSC (born 6 June 1977) is a Belgian-British chemist and professor of physical chemistry at Durham University.

== Early life and education ==
Verlet was born on 6 June 1977 in Belgium. He completed undergraduate studies at King's College London, and obtained his Doctor of Philosophy from the same institution in 2003, having been supervised by Helen H. Fielding.

== Career and research ==
Verlet worked as a post-doctoral fellow with Daniel M. Neumark at the University of California, Berkeley (2003–2006), studying water-cluster anions. In 2006, he was appointed to lecturer and was awarded an EPSRC Advanced Research Fellowship at Durham University. His research focuses on the photochemistry of anions, electron-driven dynamics in molecules and molecule-solvent clusters, and electrons at water-air interfaces.

== Awards and honours ==
- 2016 Fellow of the Royal Society of Chemistry (FRSC)
- 2021 RSC Corday-Morgan Prize
- 2023 RSC Bourke-Liversidge Award
