= Madhavi Krishnan (chemist) =

British chemist and researcher

- Education: University of Michigan; Anna University
- Awards: Nernst-Haber-Bodenstein Prize Corday-Morgan Prize
- Scientific career
- Workplaces: University of Oxford; University of Zurich; ETH Zurich; TU Dresden; Harvard John A. Paulson School of Engineering and Applied Sciences
- Thesis: Innovations in DNA analysis device technology : exploiting the effects of scale (2004)

Madhavi Krishnan is Professor of Physical Chemistry at the University of Oxford. Krishnan invented the electrostatic fluidic trap which permits the spatial control and manipulation of matter at the molecular scale. These traps enable highly precise measurements of the size, charge and shape of molecules in the solution phase. They also support the sensitive detection of biomarkers of disease, allowing for early diagnosis.

== Early life and education ==
Krishnan earned her undergraduate degree in Engineering at Anna University in Chennai. She moved to the United States for graduate studies at the University of Michigan at Ann Arbor in the area of microfluidics and complex fluids. Krishnan was an Alexander von Humboldt Foundation Fellow at TU Dresden, where she developed new techniques to trap colloidal nanoparticles and stretch DNA. In 2008 she was awarded a Marie Curie Fellowship and moved to ETH Zurich. She was a visiting scholar at the Harvard John A. Paulson School of Engineering and Applied Sciences.

== Research and career ==
In 2012, Krishnan was appointed an Assistant Professor of Physical Chemistry at University of Zurich, supported by a Professorship of the Swiss National Science Foundation. She moved to the University of Oxford in 2018, as an Associate Professor of Physical Chemistry.

Krishnan investigates single-molecule imaging, making use of electrostatic fluid traps to suspend nanoscale materials. Traditionally, molecular traps need external fields (for example, ion traps and optical tweezers), which can perturb the systems that are under investigation. Investigating molecules in a field-free, electrostatic trap permits the non-destructive analysis of molecules in fluids at room temperature. Studying molecules in this way allows for unparalleled opportunity to understand molecular size and charge.

In September 2023, Krishnan was awarded a Title of Distinction of Professor of Physical Chemistry by the University of Oxford.

In an independent line of activity Krishnan is examining the origins of and mechanisms underpinning the electrosolvation force and its relevance across a range of areas in biology and chemistry.

== Awards and honours ==
- 2016 German Bunsen Society for Physical Chemistry Nernst-Haber-Bodensteinpreis
- 2018 European Research Council Consolidator Grant
- 2020 Corday–Morgan Prize
- 2025 European Research Council Advanced Grant

== Selected publications ==
- Krishnan, Madhavi; Ugaz, Victor M.; Burns, Mark A. (25 October 2002). "PCR in a Rayleigh-Bénard Convection Cell". Science. 298 (5594): 793. doi:10.1126/science.298.5594.793. ISSN 0036-8075. PMID 12399582.
- Krishnan, Madhavi; Mojarad, Nassiredin; Kukura, Philipp; Sandoghdar, Vahid (6 October 2010). "Geometry-induced electrostatic trapping of nanometric objects in a fluid". Nature. 467 (7316): 692–695. Bibcode:2010Natur.467..692K. doi:10.1038/nature09404. ISSN 0028-0836. PMID 20930840. S2CID 205222381.
- "Single molecule electrometry". Nature Nanotechnology. 12: 488–495. 13 March 2017.
- "Measurements of molecular size and shape on a chip". Science. 388 (6747): 608. 13 March 2017.
