= Martin Heeney =

British chemist

- Born: April 1973 (age 53)
- Education: University of East Anglia
- Awards: Corday–Morgan Prize (2013)
- Scientific career
- Workplaces: Queen Mary University of London; Imperial College London
- Doctoral advisor: Prof Michael Cook

Martin James Heeney (born April 1973) is a professor of chemistry at King Abdullah University of Science and Technology and professor of Organic Materials at Imperial College London.

Heeney is a graduate of University of East Anglia, and received his PhD in organic materials chemistry from the same institution in 1999 under the supervision of Michael Cook.

He was awarded the Corday–Morgan Prize by the Royal Society of Chemistry in 2013.

He has an h-index of 98 according to Google Scholar.
