= Carmen Domene =

Spanish chemist and academic

- Education: University of Exeter; University of Oxford
- Scientific career
- Workplaces: King's College London; University of Oxford; University of Bath; University of Pennsylvania
- Thesis: Many-body effects in interionic interactions (2000)

Carmen Domene is a Spanish academic who is a professor of chemistry at the University of Bath. Her research makes use of computational simulations to understand biological systems and processes. She was awarded the 2020 International Society of Quantum Biology and Pharmacology Loew Award and the 2023 Royal Society of Chemistry Corday-Morgan Prize.

== Early life and education ==
Domene is from Spain. She was an undergraduate at the University of Seville. Domene was a graduate student at the University of Exeter, where she worked on many body effects in interionic interactions with Patrick Fowler. She was awarded a Royal Society University Research Fellowship and moved to the University of Oxford. She then moved to the University of Pennsylvania. She also worked with Michele Parrinello at ETH Zurich.

== Research and career ==
In 2012, Domene joined King's College London as a Reader in Chemistry. In 2017, she moved to the University of Bath. Her research makes use of molecular modelling to better understand biological materials and processes. She uses molecular mechanics and basic laws of physics to understand atomic structure, and combinations of molecular and quantum mechanics to understand dynamic chemical processes.

Domene makes use of supercomputers to investigate the molecular mechanisms of ion channels, including the transient receptor potential and potassium channels. By better understanding how ion channels open and close, Domene looks to define how they are related to neurological conditions and chronic pain. She used computational simulations to create a cell membrane, in which she could place specific proteins and recreate the environment inside and outside. Her simulations allow her to monitor ion movements and better understand which biomolecules are involved with ion gating or the modulation of channel activity.

Domene works on computational simulations for drug discovery. To better understand how her proteins bind different chemical groups, Domene has simulated how her proteins respond to molecular environments.

== Awards and honours ==
- 2020 International Society of Quantum Biology and Pharmacology Loew Award
- 2023 Corday-Morgan Prize

== Selected publications ==
- E Albertazzi; C Domene; P W. Fowler; T Heine; G Seifert; C Van Alsenoy; F Zerbetto (1999). "Pentagon adjacency as a determinant of fullerene stability". Physical Chemistry Chemical Physics. 1 (12): 2913–2918. doi:10.1039/a901600g. ISSN 1463-9076. Wikidata Q58279341.
- Rasheduzzaman Chowdhury; Michael A McDonough; Jasmin Mecinovic; Christoph Loenarz; Emily Flashman; Kirsty S Hewitson; Carmen Domene; Christopher J. Schofield (1 July 2009). "Structural basis for binding of hypoxia-inducible factor to the oxygen-sensing prolyl hydroxylases". Structure. 17 (7): 981–989. doi:10.1016/j.str.2009.06.002. ISSN 0969-2126. PMID 19604478. Wikidata Q27656451.
- Oliver Beckstein; Philip C. Biggin; Peter J Bond; Joanne N Bright; Carmen Domene; Alessandro Grottesi; John Holyoake; Mark S.P. Sansom (1 November 2003). "Ion channel gating: insights via molecular simulations". FEBS Letters. 555 (1): 85–90. doi:10.1016/s0014-5793(03)01151-7. ISSN 0014-5793. PMID 14630324. Wikidata Q35589991.
