= David Manolopoulos =

English theoretical chemist

David E. Manolopoulos
- Born: 14 December 1961 (age 64); Gillingham, Kent, UK
- Education: University of Cambridge
- Awards: Marlow Medal (1995); Corday–Morgan Prize (1997)
- Scientific career
- Fields: Quantum chemistry Reaction dynamics
- Workplaces: University of Nottingham; University of Oxford
- Thesis: Close-coupled equations: the log derivative approach to inelastic scattering, bound state and photofragmentation problems.
- Doctoral advisor: David Clary
- Website: manolopoulos.chem.ox.ac.uk

David Eusthatios Manolopoulos (born 14 December 1961) is an English theoretical chemist. He is a Professor of Theoretical Chemistry at University of Oxford. His research focuses on the computational modeling of the dynamics of elementary chemical reactions in the gas phase and quantum mechanical effects in chemical dynamics. His research highlights include work on path integral approach to molecular dynamics and chemical topics as diverse as fullerenes, ring polymers, reactive scattering, and more recently, the molecular and quantum mechanism of avian magnetoreception.

He was awarded the Marlow Award and the Corday–Morgan Prize. He has been involved with editing the Journal of Chemical Physics.

== Biography ==
Manolopoulos read natural sciences at Cambridge, graduating with a BA in 1984 and a PhD, under David Clary, in 1988. He then undertook potdoctoral research at UT Austin, before becoming a lecturer in physical chemistry at Nottingham in 1990. He moved to Oxford in 1995, becoming a professor in 2005.

== Bibliography ==
- Fowler, P. W.; Manolopoulos, D. E. (2006). An atlas of fullerenes (illustrated ed.). Mineola, N.Y.: Dover Publications. ISBN 0-486-45362-6. OCLC 70775791.

== See also ==
- Quantum biology
