= Radha Boya =

Indian nanoscientist

Radha Boya (published as Boya Radha) is a nanofluidics and condensed matter physics researcher from India who works in the UK as Professor of Nanoscience and Royal Society University Research Fellow in the Department of Physics & Astronomy at the University of Manchester. Her research has concerned the novel behaviors of liquids, gases, and ions when they are confined to angstrom-scale tubes, and has also included methods for the lithographic fabrication of these tubes.

== Education and career ==
Boya grew up in India, educated in three languages: Telegu, English, and Hindi. After a 2005 bachelor's degree, and a 2007 master's degree in chemistry, she completed a Ph.D. in materials science in 2012, at the Jawaharlal Nehru Centre for Advanced Scientific Research in Bengaluru. Her doctoral research was supervised by Giridhar U. Kulkarni.

She was a postdoctoral researcher in the United States, with Chad Mirkin at Northwestern University, and then through a Marie Curie Fellowship at the University of Manchester, before obtaining a permanent position on the University of Manchester academic staff.

== Recognition ==
Boya won the 2020 Faraday Early Career Prize / Marlow Award of the Royal Society of Chemistry, honored "for contributions to creating Angstrom-scale atomically smooth capillaries from two-dimensional materials and unravelling the properties of fluids under atomic-scale confinement".

Boya was a 2018 International Rising Talents laureate in the L'Oréal-UNESCO For Women in Science Awards. She was a 2021 recipient of the Philip Leverhulme Prize, and was the 2022 recipient of the Analytical Chemistry Young Innovator Award, sponsored by Analytical Chemistry and the Chemical and Biological Microsystems Society. In 2024, she became the ChemSocRev Pioneering Investigator Lecturer for the Royal Society of Chemistry. She was one of three UK honorees in the physical sciences and engineering in the 2026 Blavatnik Awards for Young Scientists.
