= John Shipley Rowlinson =

British chemist

Sir John Shipley Rowlinson
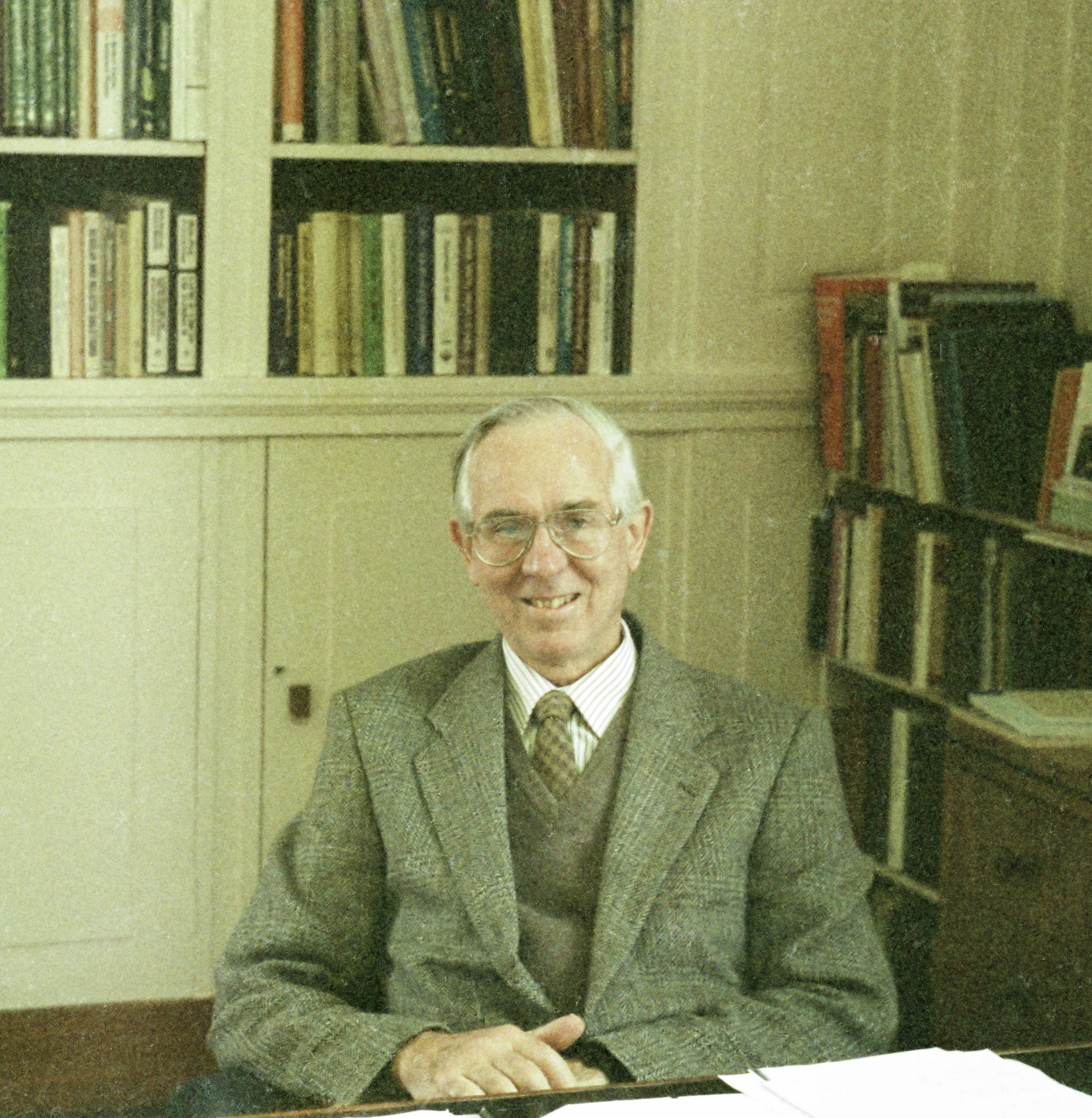
- J. S. Rowlinson in his office in June 1991
- Born: 12 May 1926; Handforth, Cheshire, England
- Died: 15 August 2018 (aged 92)
- Awards: Faraday Lectureship Prize (1983)
- Scientific career
- Workplaces: Imperial College London; University of Oxford

Sir John Shipley Rowlinson FRS FREng (12 May 1926 – 15 August 2018) was a British chemist. He attended Oxford University, where he completed his undergraduate studies in 1948 and doctoral in 1950. He then became research associate at University of Wisconsin (1950–1951), lecturer at University of Manchester (1951–1961), Professor at Imperial College London (1961–1973) and back at Oxford from 1974 to his retirement in 1993.

His works covered a wide range of subjects, including on capillarity (the ability of a liquid to flow in narrow spaces without the assistance of, or even in opposition to, external forces like gravity) and cohesion (forces that make similar molecules stick together). In addition, he wrote about the history of science, including multiple works on the Dutch physicist Johannes Diderik van der Waals (1837–1923). He was a Fellow of the Royal Society and the Royal Academy of Engineering. He received a Faraday Lectureship Prize in 1983 and was knighted in 2000.

== Early life ==
Born in Handforth, Cheshire, on 12 May 1926, Rowlinson attended the independent Rossall School in Fleetwood. He was educated at Trinity College, Oxford, where in 1944 he was awarded a Millard scholarship to read chemistry. His tutor was Professor Sir Cyril Hinshelwood, who was the first head of the Physical Chemistry Laboratory. He graduated with first-class honours in 1948. After graduation, he continued his studies at Oxford and received a D.Phil. in 1950 in chemical kinetics, working under J. D. Lambert.

== Career ==
In 1950, Rowlinson won a Fulbright scholarship and became a research associate at the University of Wisconsin in Madison. There, he was member of Joseph O. Hirschfelder's team and worked with C. F. Curtiss on various topics in physical chemistry. In 1951 he moved to the University of Manchester where he worked as a Fellow. Subsequently, he became lecturer and senior lecturer at the same university.

In 1961, Rowlinson was appointed Professor in Chemical Technology at Imperial College London. He was elected a Fellow of the Royal Society in 1970. In 1974, he moved to Oxford as Dr Lee's Professor of Chemistry. He was appointed a Fellow of the Royal Academy of Engineering in 1976. He received the Faraday Lectureship Prize in 1983 for 'exceptional contributions to physical or theoretical chemistry'. He retired in 1993, becoming an emeritus Fellow of Exeter College, Oxford. After his formal retirement he continued to write scientific papers. He was knighted in the 2000 Birthday Honours. In 2008, he received the Sidney M. Edelstein Award for Outstanding Achievement in the History of Chemistry from the American Chemical Society.

== Work ==
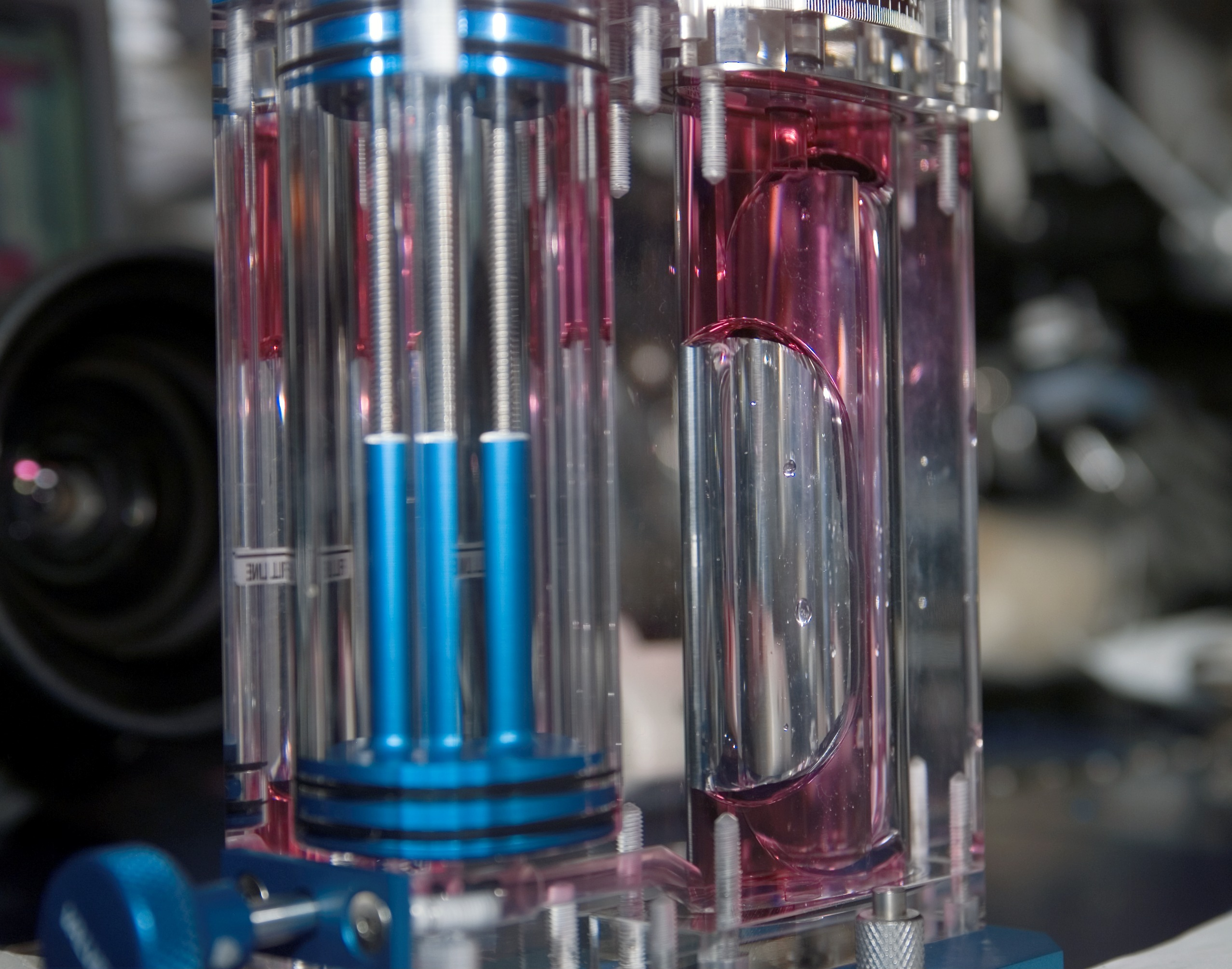
Capillarity (experiment onboard the International Space Station pictured) was one of Rowlinson's main areas of focus.

Throughout his career, Rowlinson wrote more than 200 papers and book chapters. While he contributed to a wide range of topics, his main areas of focus were capillarity and cohesion (forces that make molecules 'stick' together). His Molecular Theory of Capillarity—co-written with Benjamin Widom in 1982—is widely cited in scientific and engineering literatures: it had more than 2,000 citations by 2010. His earlier work, Liquids and Liquid Mixtures (1958) is also similarly popular and is described by Widom as a "classic". His acclaimed 2002 work Cohesion described intermolecular forces, their scientific history and their effect on properties of matter in great detail. He also co-wrote a textbook Thermodynamics for Chemical Engineers (1975). Other scientific topics he wrote about include phase transitions, critical phenomena, computer simulations of interfaces, glaciers, and information theory.

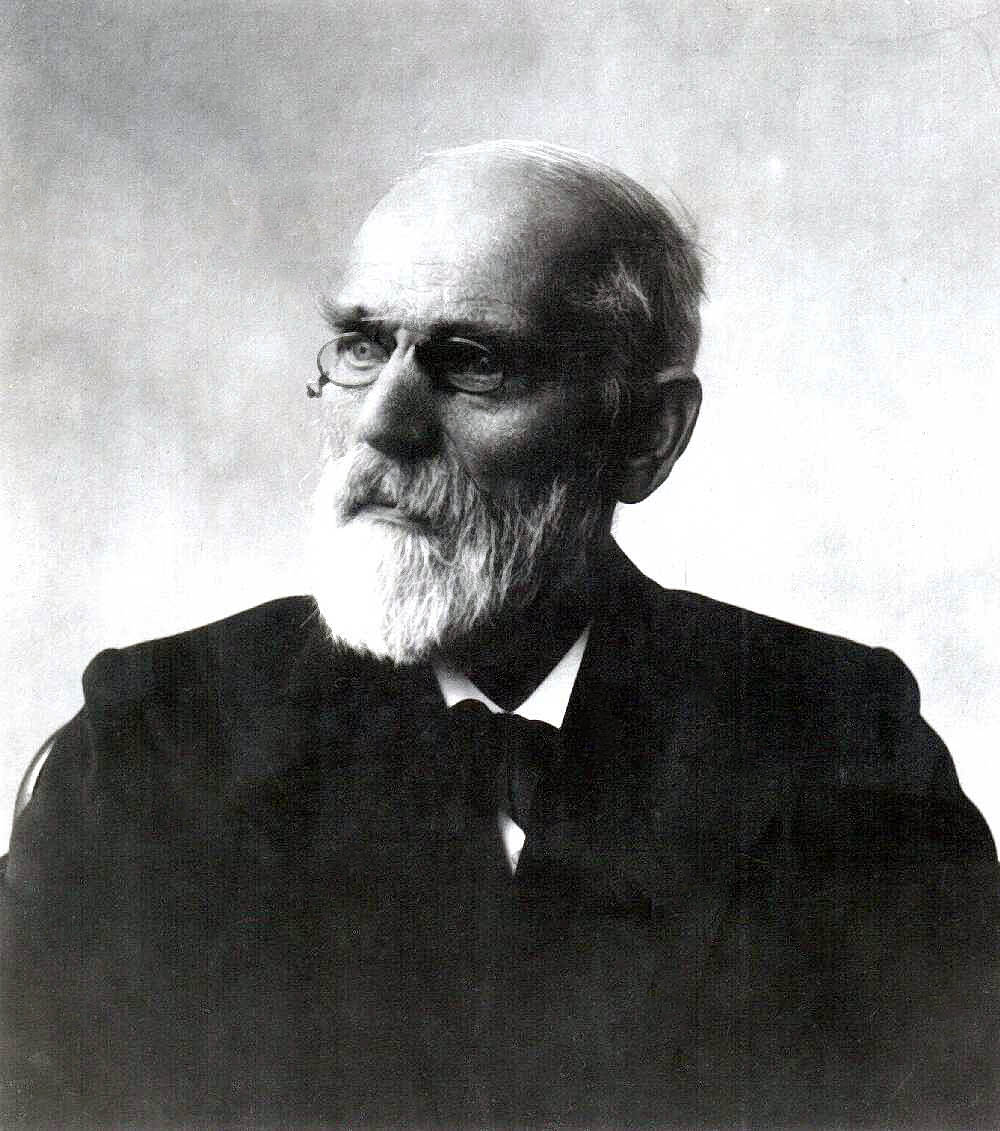
Johannes Diderik van der Waals (1837 – 1923), the Dutch physicist who was the subject of many works of Rowlinson.

In addition to his technical works, Rowlinson wrote about the history of science. His works on this topic began with the Nature paper The Legacy of van der Waals in 1973. He followed it up with further works on Johannes Diderik van der Waals, including a 1988 translation of van der Waals' doctoral thesis, and a 1996 biography of the Dutch physicist. His colleague Benjamin Widom praised the translation as "no less[...] than a masterwork" and the accompanying introduction "brilliant both as science and as history". His Molecular Theory of Capillarity also treats the topic's history in addition to its technical aspect.

Rowlinson also contributed to the administration of science in his native United Kingdom. He expanded the scope of Oxford's physical chemistry research and history of science teaching. He supported Oxford's collection displayed at the Museum of the History of Science. He was the editor of the journal Molecular Physics.

== Personal life ==
Rowlinson routinely climbed the Swiss Alps and had also climbed in the Himalayas. He was an active member of the Exeter College community at Oxford and regularly attended its lunches and alumni events. He died on 15 August 2018.
