= Nicholas Turner (chemist) =

British chemist

Nicholas Turner FRS
- Born: Nicholas John Turner; 1959 or 1960 (age 66–67)
- Education: University of Bristol; University of Oxford
- Known for: Biotechnology; Cell biology Biocatalysis; Organic synthesis
- Awards: RSC Carbohydrate Chemistry Award (1992); Corday–Morgan Prize (1996); RSC Industrial Organic Award (2009); Organic Stereochemistry Award (2017); ACS Catalysis Lectureship (2018); Fellow of the Royal Society (2020)
- Scientific career
- Fields: Biochemistry; Organic chemistry
- Workplaces: The University of Manchester
- Thesis: Mechanistic studies on isopenicillin N synthase (1985)
- Doctoral advisor: Jack Baldwin

Nicholas John Turner, FRS is a British chemist and a professor in the Department of Chemistry at The University of Manchester. His research in general is based on biochemistry and organic chemistry, specifically on biotechnology, cell biology, biocatalysis and organic synthesis.

== Education ==
From the age of 13 (after attending an unknown preparatory school), Turner attended Preston School in Somerset, UK. Turner completed his Bachelor of Science degree in Chemistry in 1982 at University of Bristol. He then read for his Doctor of Philosophy degree at University of Oxford on Mechanistic studies on isopenicillin N synthase and successfully completed it in 1985. His PhD was supervised by Jack Baldwin.

== Research and career ==
Upon completing his PhD, Turner spent two years (1985–1987) with George M. Whitesides at Harvard University as a Royal Society Junior Research Fellow. He then moved to University of Exeter as a lecturer in 1987, before moving to University of Edinburgh for the position of Reader in 1995. He was promoted to the position of Professor in 1998 and moved to University of Manchester as a professor of Chemical Biology in 2004.

Turner's research in general is based on biochemistry and organic chemistry, specifically on biotechnology, cell biology, biocatalysis and organic synthesis.

Turner is the Director of CoEBio^{3}, an organisation designed to provide scientific environment in which the necessary research and development can be carried out to create new biocatalyst-based processes to meet the changing needs of industry in the next 10–20 years. He is also the co-founder of Ingenza and co-director of SYNBIOCHEM. Turner is also the author of several books in the field of biocatalysis including Introduction to Biocatalysis Using Enzymes and Microorganisms, and Biocatalysis in Organic Synthesis: The Retrosynthesis Approach.

=== Notable work ===
Turner was elected as a Fellow of the Royal Society in the year 2020. Regarded one of the world's leading researchers in the field of Biocatalysis, his profile reads:

"Nicholas Turner undertakes research focussed on creating new enzymes for application as biocatalysts for chemical synthesis. His group combine enzyme discovery with protein engineering and directed evolution methods in order to develop biocatalysts with tailored properties including high (stereo)selectivity, improved activity and enhanced stability. These biocatalysts, which include amine/alcohol oxidases, imine reductases, lyases, transaminases and monooxygenases, are then applied to the synthesis of a range of target molecules especially pharmaceuticals and fine chemicals. ... Nick also has a passion for promoting the wider application of biocatalysis across the entire chemical community and has developed guidelines for 'biocatalytic retrosynthesis' to encourage greater adoption of biocatalysis amongst synthetic chemists."

=== Awards and nominations ===
- RSC Carbohydrate Chemistry Award (1992)
- Corday–Morgan Prize (1996)
- RSC Industrial Organic Award (2009)
- Organic Stereochemistry Award (2017)
- ACS Catalysis Lectureship (2018)
- Fellow of the Royal Society (2020)

== Major publications ==
- Turner, N.; Köhler, V.; Wilson, V.M.; Dürrenberger, M.; Ghislieri, D.; Churakova, E.; Quinto, T; Knörr, L.; Häussinger, D.; Hollmann, F.; Ward, T.R. (2013). "Synthetic cascades are enabled by combining biocatalysts with artificial metalloenzymes". Nature Chemistry. 5 (2): 93–99. doi:10.1038/nchem.1498. PMID 23344429. S2CID 205290846.
- Turner, Nicholas; O’Reilly, Elaine (2013). "Biocatalytic retrosynthesis" (PDF). Nature Chemical Biology. 9 (5): 285–288. doi:10.1038/nchembio.1235. PMID 23594772.
- Turner, Nicholas (23 April 2012). "Oxidation of C – N Bonds". In Drauz, Karlheinz; Gröger, Harald; May, Oliver (eds.). Biocatalysis in Organic Synthesis: The Retrosynthesis Approach. United Kingdom: Wiley-VCH Verlag GmbH & Co. KGaA. pp. 1535–1552. doi:10.1002/9783527639861. ISBN 9783527325474.
- Turner, Nicholas; Jones, Patrik R.; Akhtar, M. Kalim (2012). "Carboxylic acid reductase is a versatile enzyme for the conversion of fatty acids into fuels and chemical commodities". PNAS. 110 (1): 87–92. doi:10.1073/pnas.1216516110. PMC 3538209. PMID 23248280.
- Turner, Nicholas (2009). "Directed evolution drives the next generation of biocatalysts". Nature Chemical Biology. 5 (8): 567–573. doi:10.1038/nchembio.203. PMID 19620998.
