= Elena Besley =

Computational chemist, researcher

Elena Besley FRSC
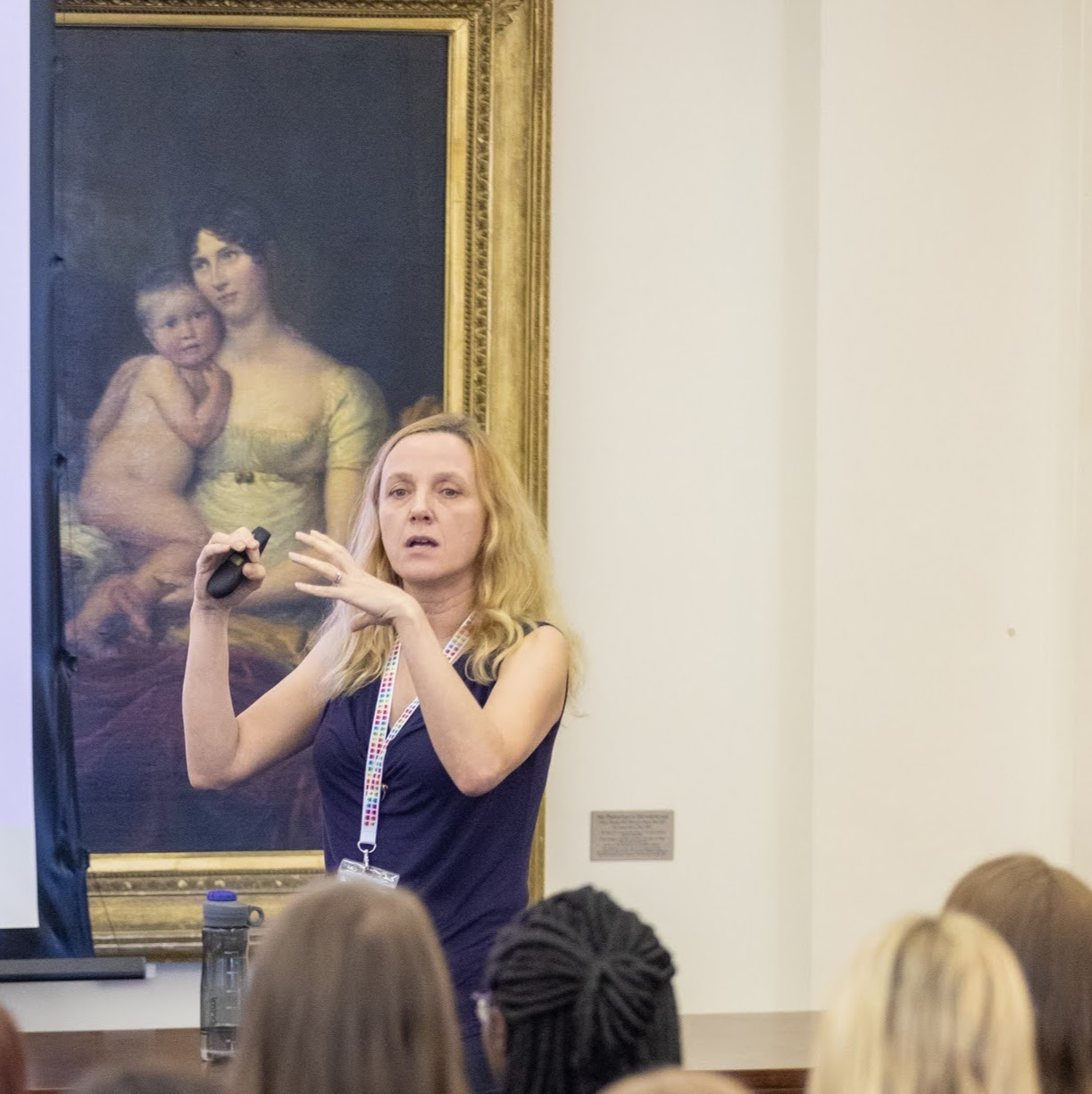
- Born: Elena Bichoutskaia; St. Petersburg, Russia
- Education: Saint Petersburg State University (PhD)
- Children: Emily Besley
- Awards: Royal Society Wolfson Fellowship (2020)
- Scientific career
- Fields: Theoretical chemistry; Computational chemistry
- Workplaces: University of Nottingham; University of Cambridge; University of Sussex
- Website: ebesley.chem.nottingham.ac.uk

Elena Besley (née Bichoutskaia) FRSC is a British scientist who is Professor of Theoretical and Computational Chemistry at the University of Nottingham. She holds a Royal Society Wolfson Fellowship and is Associate Editor of Nano Letters.

== Early life and education ==
Besley studied physics at Saint Petersburg State University and graduated with a Master of Science (MSci) degree in physics in 1993. In 2000, she completed a joint honours PhD in physics and mathematics at Saint Petersburg State University under the supervision of Alexander Devdariani and joined Queen's University Belfast on a NATO–Royal Society fellowship.

== Research and career ==
Between 2000 and 2007, Besley had postdoctoral research appointments at the University of Nottingham, the University of Sussex, and the University of Cambridge. In 2007 Besley was awarded a Royal Society Relocation Fellowship at the University of Nottingham and a Visiting Academic Research Fellowship at the Australian National University, Canberra.

At the University of Nottingham, Besley was appointed to Lecturer in Theoretical and Computational Chemistry in 2011, followed by promotion to Associate Professor in 2014, and to Professor of Theoretical and Computational Chemistry in 2015. Besley is featured in an expert database for Outstanding Female Scientists and Scholars "AcademiaNet: Profiles of Leading Women Scientists".

Her research includes the development of theoretical and computational methods for the prediction of materials properties; computational modelling of the behaviour, properties and manipulation of nanomaterials; investigations into the electrostatic interactions and self-assembly of materials; gas storage and interactions in porous solids. She has investigated how the electron beams of transmission electron microscopes interact with materials.

== Awards and honours ==
- 1996 UNESCO Anniversary Award "for distinguished success in study and scientific activities"
- 2000 Royal Society NATO Postdoctoral Fellowship
- 2007 Royal Society UK Relocation Fellowship
- 2008 EPSRC Career Acceleration Fellowship
- 2012 New Directions for EPSRC Research Leaders Award
- 2013 ERC Consolidator Grant
- 2017 Fellow of the Royal Society of Chemistry
- 2021 Royal Society Leverhulme Trust Senior Research Fellowship

== Select publications ==
Her publications include:

- Bichoutskaia, Elena (2011). Computational Nanoscience. Royal Society of Chemistry. ISBN 978-1-84973-133-1.
- Bichoutskaia, Elena (2010). "Direct transformation of graphene to fullerene". Nature Chemistry. 2 (6): 450–453. Bibcode:2010NatCh...2..450C. doi:10.1038/nchem.644. PMID 20489712.
- Bichoutskaia, Elena (2010). "Electrostatic analysis of the interactions between charged particles of dielectric materials". The Journal of Chemical Physics. 133 (2): 024105. Bibcode:2010JChPh.133b4105B. doi:10.1063/1.3457157. PMID 20632746.
