= Russell E. Morris =

British chemist (born 1967)

Russell Morris FRS FRSE FRSC FLSW
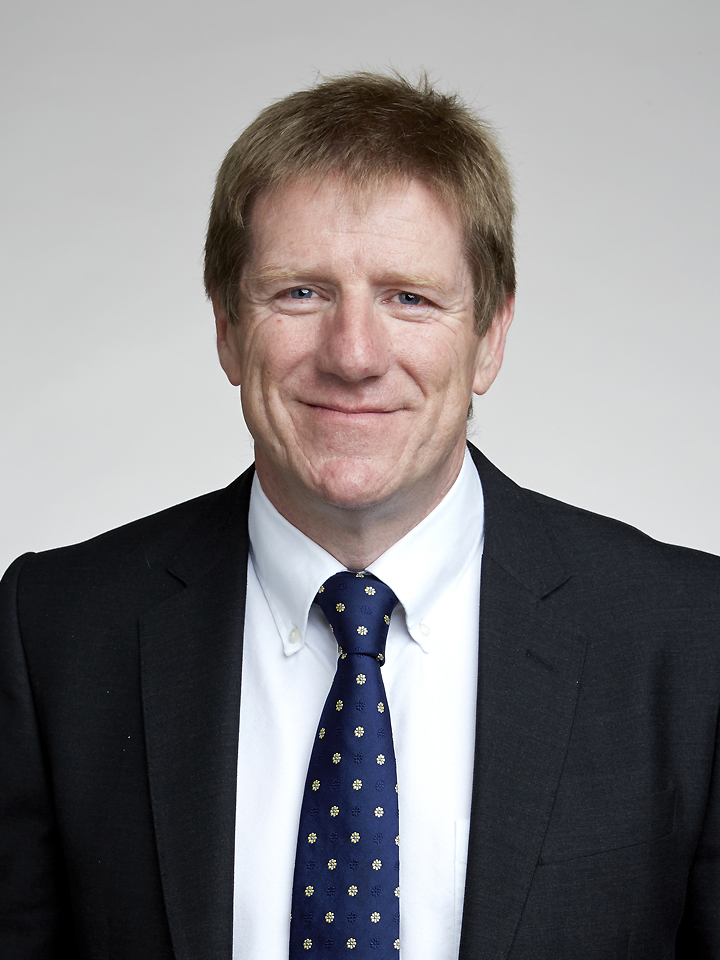
- Morris in 2016
- Born: 8 June 1967 (age 59); St Asaph, Wales
- Education: Ysgol Dyffryn Conwy
- Alma mater: Oriel College, Oxford
- Spouse: Silke Wewetzer (m. 2002)
- Children: 2
- Awards: Frank Brian Mercer award
- Scientific career
- Workplaces: University of St Andrews
- Thesis: Synthesis and characterization of metal phosphites and selenites (1992)
- Doctoral advisor: Anthony Cheetham
- Cricket career

Cricket information
- Batting: Right-handed
- Bowling: Right-arm medium

Domestic team information
- Years: Team
- 1987–1991: University of Oxford
- 1990–1991: Wales Minor Counties

Career statistics
Competition	First-class	List A
Matches	35	4
Runs scored	1,109	44
Batting average	23.10	11.00
100s/50s	0/10	0/0
Top score	96	19
Balls bowled	162	–
Wickets	2	–
Bowling average	72.50	–
5 wickets in innings	0	–
10 wickets in match	0	–
Best bowling	2/82	–
Catches/stumpings	8/–	0/–
- Source: Cricinfo, 10 November 2011
- Website: st-andrews.ac.uk/profile/rem1

Russell Edward Morris (born 8 June 1967) is a British chemist and Bishop Wardlaw Professor of Chemistry at the University of St Andrews since 2016. He played first-class cricket while he was a student at the University of Oxford, and also represented the university in association football playing in Varsity matches at various venues, including Wembley Stadium and Highbury.

== Education and early life ==
Russell Edward Morris was born on 8 June 1967 in St Asaph, Wales, to Merfyn Morris and Ursula Patricia Morris. His father Merfyn worked as a plumber in Glan Conwy in North Wales. Russell was educated at Ysgol Dyffryn Conwy in Llanrwst and went to Oriel College, Oxford, where he was awarded a Bachelor of Arts degree in chemistry in 1989, followed by a Doctor of Philosophy degree in 1992 for research investigating the synthesis and characterization of metal phosphites and selenites, supervised by Anthony Cheetham.

== Research and scientific career ==
Morris's research interests lie in the synthesis, characterisation and application of porous and layered materials including zeolites and metal-organic frameworks (MOFs). He developed ionothermal synthesis – the use of ionic liquids as reactive media for the preparation of solids – a method that has had impact across a wide range of chemistry. His recent work on developing the assembly–disassembly–organisation–reassembly (ADOR) approach to the preparation of zeolites offers routes to exciting materials that would not be possible using standard techniques.

Morris is recognized as a pioneer in the use of porous materials for the storage and delivery of biologically active gases for medical applications.

=== Awards and honours ===
Morris was elected a Fellow of the Royal Society (FRS) in 2016. His applications and commercially focused work with MOFgen Ltd. and Sasol Technology UK have been recognised by the Brian Mercer Award for Innovation from the Royal Society. He was elected a Fellow of the Royal Society of Edinburgh (FRSE) in 2008, a Fellow of the Learned Society of Wales (FLSW) in 2012, and a Fellow of the Royal Society of Chemistry. In 2019, he was awarded the Tilden Prize by the Royal Society of Chemistry.

== Cricket ==
Morris was a right-handed batsman and bowled right-arm medium pace. While studying at the University of Oxford, he made his first-class debut for Oxford University Cricket Club in 1987 against Hampshire. He made 33 further first-class appearances for the university, the last of which came against Cambridge University in the 1991 University Match at Lord's. In his 34 first-class appearances for Oxford University, he scored 981 runs at an average of 21.32, with a high score of 96. This score, which was one of eight fifties he made for the university, came against Surrey at the University Parks in 1990. The same year, he also appeared once for a combined Oxford and Cambridge Universities side against the touring New Zealanders. He batted with success in this match: captaining the side, he scored 75 in the team's first innings before being dismissed by John Bracewell, while in the team's second innings, he scored 53 before being dismissed by the same bowler.

While studying at Oxford, Morris was also a part of the Combined Universities team in the 1991 Benson and Hedges Cup. He made four List A appearances during the competition, against Gloucestershire, Derbyshire, Worcestershire and Northamptonshire. In these four matches, he scored 44 runs at an average of 11.00, with a high score of 19.

Morris also played for Wales Minor Counties in the Minor Counties Championship, making two appearances in 1990 against Dorset and Wiltshire and one appearance in 1991 against Dorset.

== Personal life ==
Morris married Silke Frauke Karen Wewetzer in 2002. They have a son and a daughter.
