= Alan Carrington =

British chemist (1934–2013)

Alan Carrington CBE FRS
- Born: 6 January 1934
- Died: 31 August 2013 (aged 79)
- Education: University of Southampton (BSc, PhD)
- Scientific career
- Workplaces: University of Cambridge; University of Oxford
- Thesis: The electronic structure, spectra and properties of transition metal oxyanions
- Doctoral advisor: Martyn Symons
- Doctoral students: Timothy Softley

Alan Carrington CBE, FRS (6 January 1934 – 31 August 2013) was a British chemist and one of the leading spectroscopists in Britain in the late twentieth century.

== Education ==
Carrington was educated at Colfe's School and the University of Southampton where he was awarded the degrees of B.Sc. and Ph.D. While still a PhD student, Carrington spent a year as a research fellow at the University of Minnesota,

== Career and research ==
Carrington was a Fellow of Downing College, Cambridge between 1959 and 1967, where he worked closely with Christopher Longuet-Higgins, and became assistant director of research in 1963. In 1967 Carrington returned to the University of Southampton as one of the youngest professors of chemistry in Britain at the time, becoming a Royal Society Research Professor from 1979 until his retirement in 1999. Carrington moved his Royal Society Research Professorship from Southampton to the University of Oxford during the period 1984-1987, during which his laboratory was in the (then) Physical Chemistry Laboratories on South Parks Road. While at Oxford Carrington was a Fellow of Jesus College, Oxford, Carrington moved his research professorship back to the University of Southampton in 1987, where he remained until his retirement from the University of Southampton in 1999.

Carrington's earlier contributions to chemical physics were in the fields of electron spin resonance (esr) spectroscopy, and magnetic resonance in general. During this period Carrington authored the classic monograph on Magnetic Resonance with Andrew McLachlan, 'Introduction to Magnetic Resonance with Applications to Chemistry and Chemical Physics'.

Carrington's later work was concerned with examining the structure of molecular ions in energy regions close to their dissociation limits. This work on the spectroscopy of simple molecular ions provided accurate measurements with which theoretical calculations could usefully be compared. In particular, his work on the simplest diatomic and triatomic molecules gave rise to measurements that have not yet been matched by theoretical calculations. Much of this work is reviewed in the classic monograph authored with John M Brown, "Rotational Spectroscopy of Diatomic Molecules".

== Awards and honours ==
Carrington was elected a Fellow of the Royal Society (FRS) in 1971, and received the Faraday Lectureship Prize in 1986 and the Davy Medal in 1992. He also became a Foreign Associate of the US National Academy of Sciences in 1994. He served as President of the Faraday Division of the Royal Society of Chemistry in 1997-1998. He was made a Commander of the Order of the British Empire in 1999 and an Honorary Fellow of Downing College, Cambridge in 2000.
