= Patrick William Fowler =

British theoretical chemist

Patrick William Fowler FRS is a British theoretical chemist known for his contributions to the understanding of molecular aromaticity, fullerene chemistry, and the application of graph theory to chemical problems. He is an Emeritus Professor of Chemistry at the University of Sheffield and was elected a Fellow of the Royal Society in 2012.

== Education and career ==
Fowler was educated at the University of Sheffield, where he completed his undergraduate and postgraduate studies in chemistry. After postdoctoral work and early academic appointments, he re-joined the Department of Chemistry at the University of Sheffield in 2005, where he spent the second half of his career.

Fowler's work involves the application of mathematical methods, particularly graph theory, to problems in theoretical and computational chemistry. He has made contributions to the understanding of aromaticity, especially in polycyclic and non-benzenoid hydrocarbons, and has applied symmetry and topology in elucidating the electronic properties of fullerenes and related molecules.

He has authored or co-authored 600 peer-reviewed research papers.
