= Vernon C. Gibson =

British scientist (born 1958)

Sir Vernon Gibson CB FRS
- Born: Vernon Charles Gibson; 15 November 1958; Grantham, England
- Education: The King's School, Grantham; University of Sheffield (BSc); University of Oxford (DPhil)
- Spouse: Sue Gibson (m. 1994)
- Awards: Corday-Morgan Prize; Tilden Prize
- Scientific career
- Workplaces: Ministry of Defence; University of Manchester; Imperial College London; California Institute of Technology
- Thesis: Synthesis and reactivity studies on high-energy tertiary phosphine transition metal compounds (1983)
- Doctoral advisor: Malcolm Green
- Other academic advisors: John E. Bercaw
- Website: imperial.ac.uk/people/v.gibson

Sir Vernon Charles Gibson CB FRS (born 15 November 1958) is a British scientist who served as Chief Scientific Adviser at the Ministry of Defence between 2012 and 2016. He was reappointed to the MoD CSA role in May 2023. He is visiting professor at Imperial College London and the University of Oxford, Honorary Professor at the University of Manchester. He delivered the Royal United Services Institute (RUSI) Prince Philip Lecture on Military Education in Nov 2023.

== Early life and education ==
Gibson was born in Grantham, Lincolnshire and educated at The King's School, Grantham followed by the University of Sheffield where he studied Chemistry and graduated with a First Class Special Honours degree in 1980. He was awarded a Doctor of Philosophy degree from the University of Oxford in 1983 for research supervised by Malcolm L.H. Green.

== Career and research ==
After his DPhil, Gibson spent two years as a NATO postdoctoral research fellow with John E. Bercaw at the California Institute of Technology (Caltech).

In 2017, Gibson was appointed Executive Director of the BP International Centre for Advanced Materials and became its Executive Chair in 2021. He was Chief Scientific Adviser to the Ministry of Defence from 2012 to 2016 and Chief Chemist at BP plc from 2008 to 2012. Prior to this he was the Sir Edward Frankland Professor of Inorganic Chemistry at Imperial College London where, following foundations laid in the Chemistry Department at the University of Durham, he developed an international reputation for his fundamental studies on metal complexes and discoveries of new catalyst systems for the production of commercially relevant polymers.

=== Awards and honours ===
Gibson has received numerous national and international awards, including the Royal Society of Chemistry Corday-Morgan and Tilden Prizes, the Royal Society of Chemistry award for Organometallic Chemistry and the Joseph Chatt lectureship. He was awarded the 2020 Lord Lewis Prize 'for seminal contributions to fundamental and applied inorganic chemistry, and for critical work in policy setting at the interface of academia with industry and government.' He was elected to the Royal Society in 2004 for his seminal synthetic, structural and bonding studies on metal complexes and design of novel initiators and catalysts for controlled polymer synthesis.

He was awarded an honorary Doctor of Science degree by the University of Sheffield in 2010 and appointed Companion of the Order of the Bath in the 2017 New Year Honours, for services to Defence. He was knighted in the King’s Birthday Honours list 2025, for services to science and to defence.

== Personal life ==
Gibson is married to Sue Gibson (née Thomas). They have two grown-up children.
