= List of Royal Society of Chemistry medals and awards =

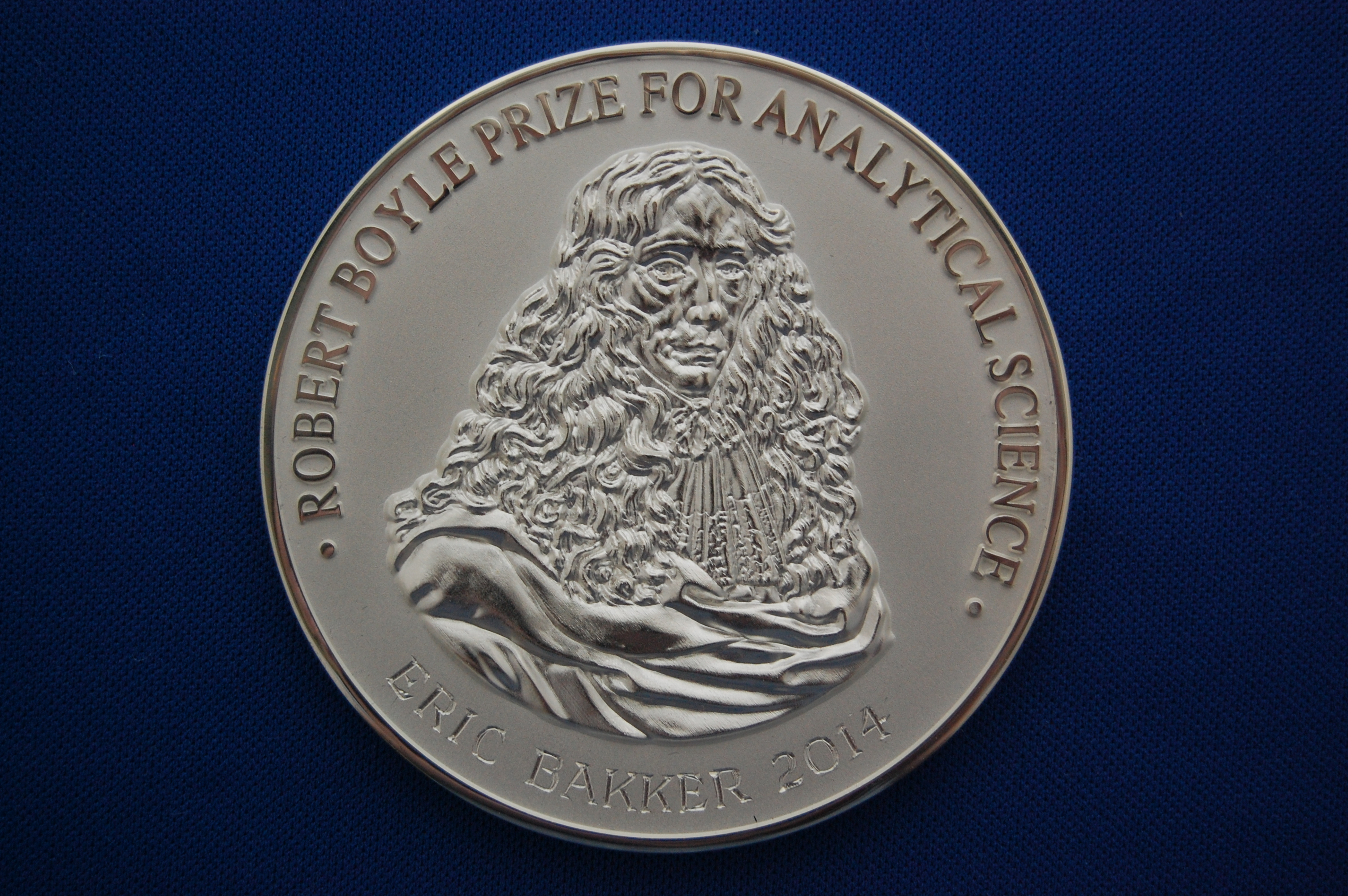
RSC award medals have a variety of designs. This is the Robert Boyle Prize for Analytical Science.

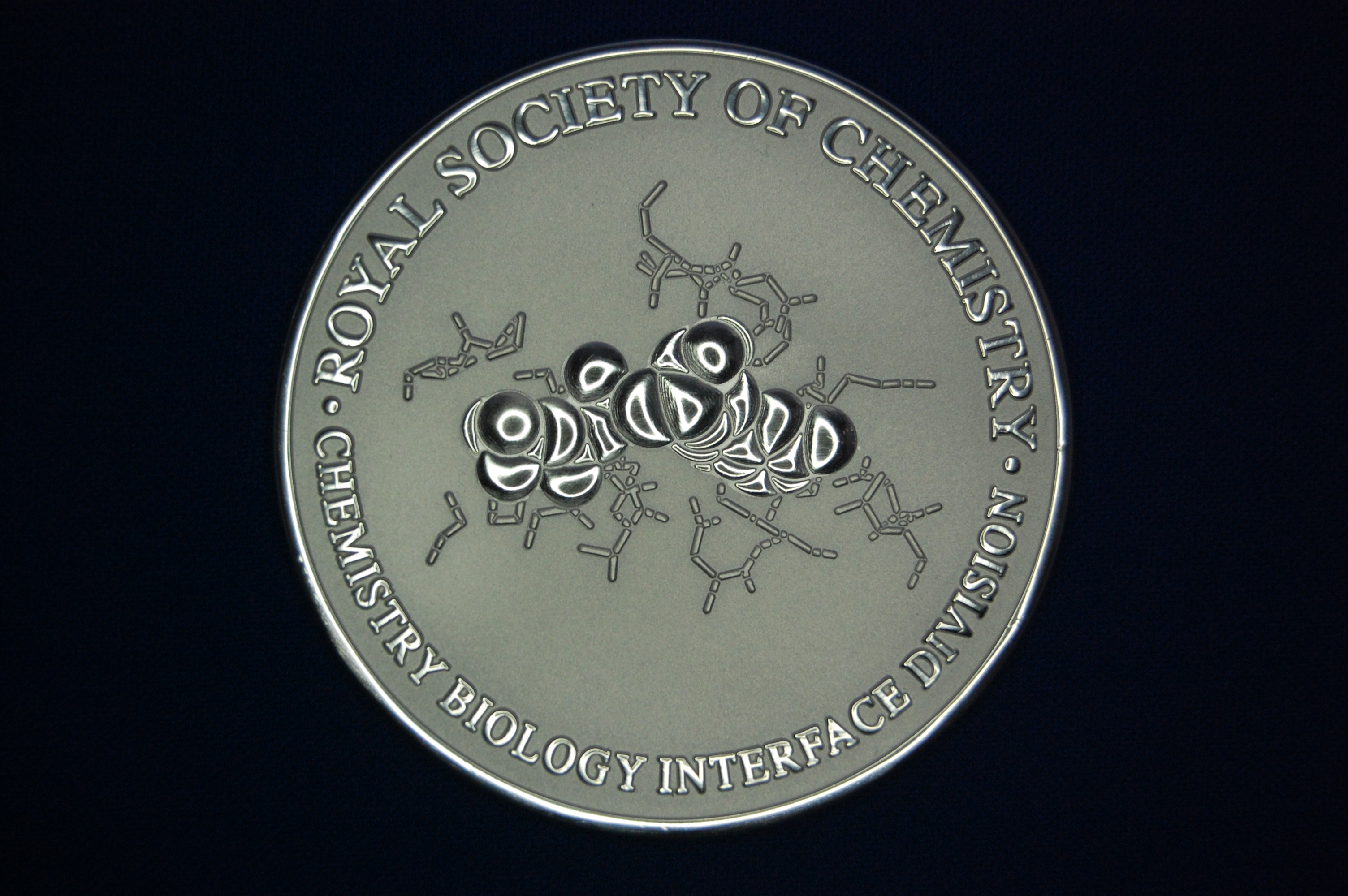
Jeremy Knowles Award

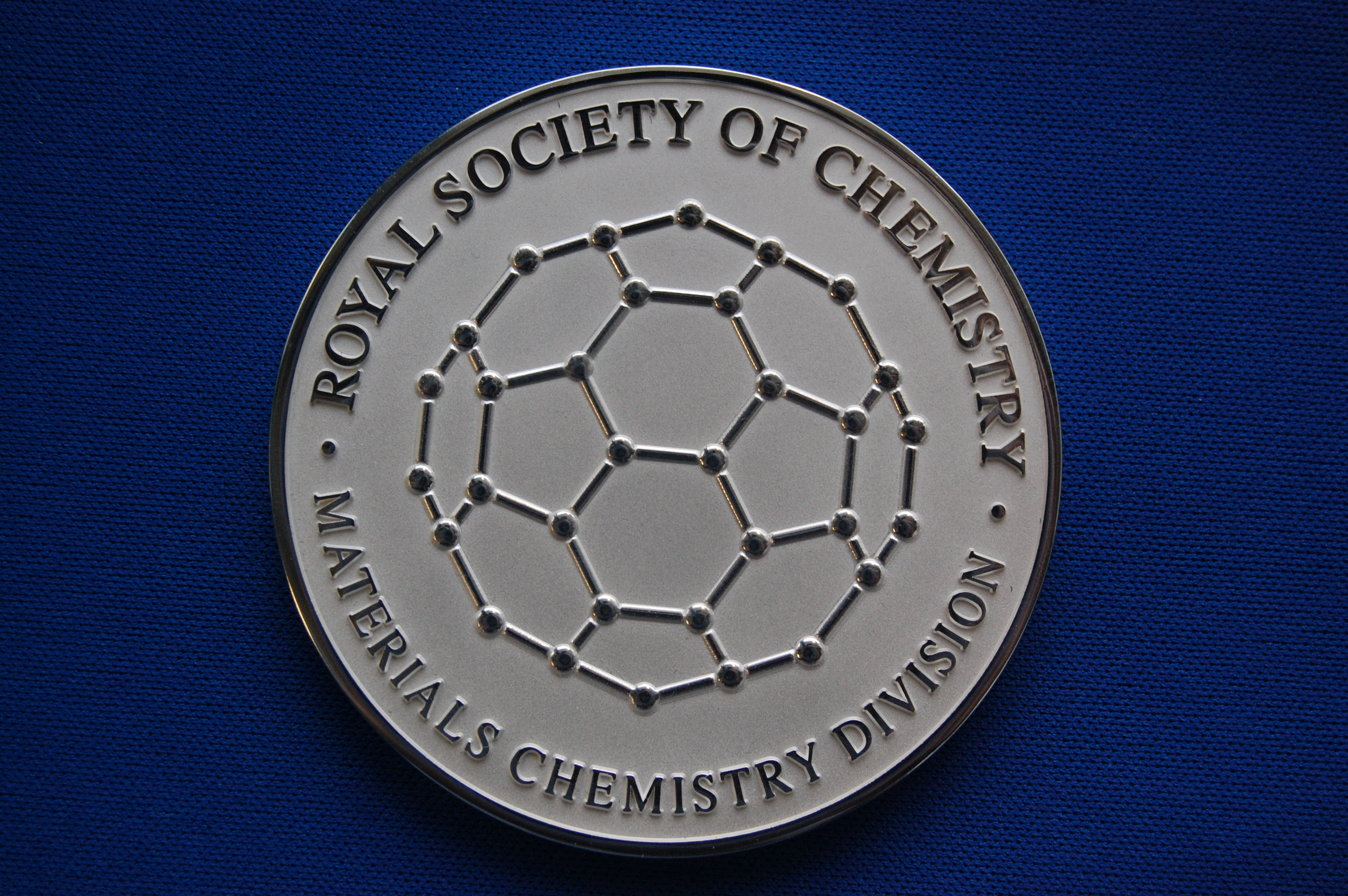
Stephanie L Kwolek Award

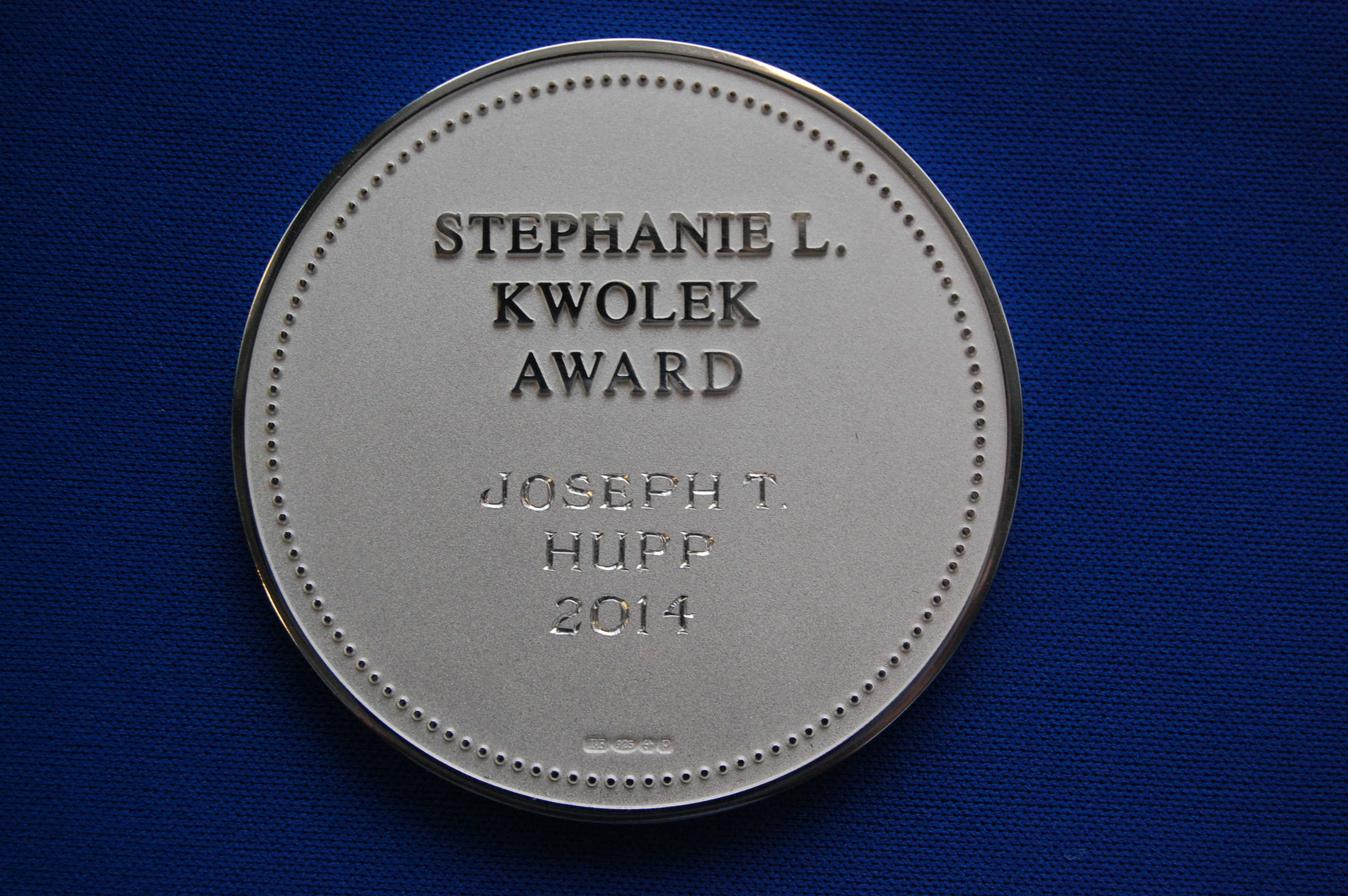
The reverse of most medals is plain. This is the 2014 Stephanie L Kwolek Award.

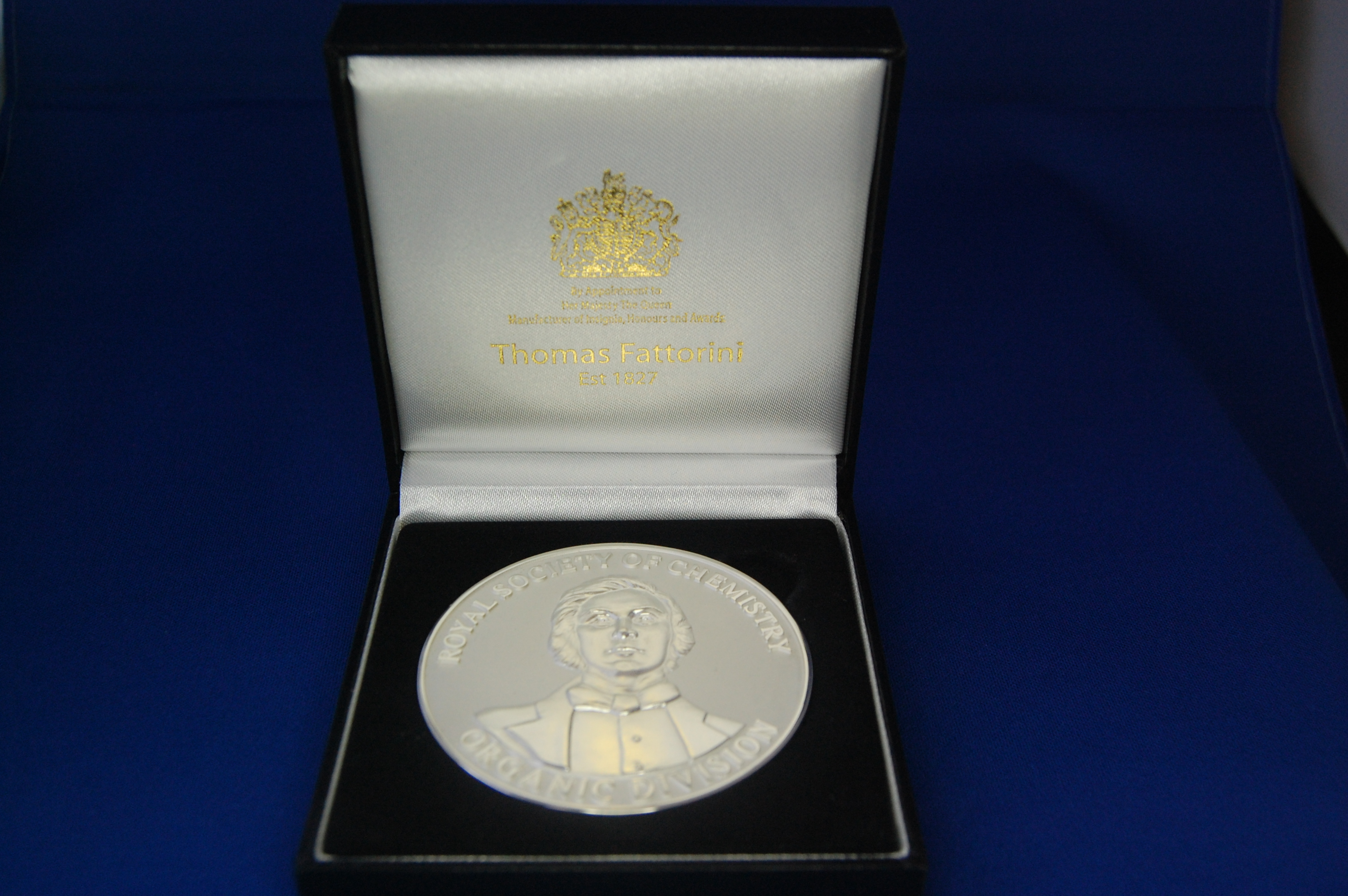
The medals, made by Thomas Fattorini Ltd of Birmingham, are presented in a box. This is the Hickinbottom Award.

The Royal Society of Chemistry grants a number of medals and awards.

All those named "prize" (except the Beilby Medal and Prize) are awarded with a £5,000 bursary. The Chemistry World Entrepreneur of the Year award has one of £4,000.

As of 2014, these are:

- Applied Catalysis Award
- Applied Inorganic Chemistry Award
- Apprentice of the Year Award
- Bader Award
- Geoffrey Barker Medal
- Barrer Award
- Sir Derek Barton Gold Medal
- Beilby Medal and Prize
- Ronald Belcher Award
- Anne Bennett Memorial Award for Distinguished Service
- Becquerel Medal
- Bill Newton Award
- Bioinorganic Chemistry Award
- Bioorganic Chemistry Award
- Materials for Industry – Derek Birchall Award
- Joseph Black Award
- Bourke Award
- Bourke–Liversidge Award
- Robert Boyle Prize for Analytical Science
- S F Boys–A Rahman Award
- Catalysis in Organic Chemistry Award
- Centenary Prize
- Joseph Chatt Award
- Chemical Dynamics Award
- Chemistry of Transition Metals Award
- Chemistry World Entrepreneur of the Year
- Corday–Morgan Prize
- Rita and John Cornforth Award
- Creativity in Industry Prize
- Dalton Young Researchers Award
- Peter Day Award
- De Gennes Prize
- Education Award
- Environment Prize
- Environment, Sustainability and Energy Division Early Career Award
- Faraday Lectureship Prize
- Faraday Medal (electrochemistry)
- Frankland Award
- Sir Edward Frankland Fellowship
- Gibson–Fawcett Award
- John B. Goodenough Award
- Green Chemistry Award
- Harrison–Meldola Memorial Prizes
- Haworth Memorial Lectureship
- Norman Heatley Award
- Hickinbottom Award
- Higher Education Teaching Award
- Homogeneous Catalysis Award
- Industrial Analytical Science Award
- Inorganic Mechanisms Awards
- Inspiration and Industry
- Interdisciplinary Prizes
- John Jeyes Award
- Khorana Prize
- Jeremy Knowles Award
- Lord Lewis Prize
- Liversidge Award
- Longstaff Prize
- Main Group Chemistry Award
- Marlow Award
- Merck Award
- Ludwig Mond Award
- Natural Product Chemistry Award
- Nyholm Prize for Education
- Nyholm Prize for Inorganic Chemistry
- Organic Industrial Chemistry Award
- Organic Stereochemistry Award
- Organometallic Chemistry Award
- Pedler Award
- Perkin Prize for Organic Chemistry
- Physical Organic Chemistry Award
- Theophilus Redwood Award
- Radiochemistry Group Young Researcher's Award
- Charles Rees Award
- Robert Robinson Award
- Schools Education Award
- Soft Matter and Biophysical Chemistry Award
- George and Christine Sosnovsky Award in Cancer Therapy
- Sir George Stokes Award
- Supramolecular Chemistry Award
- Surfaces and Interfaces Award
- Sustainable Energy Award
- Sustainable Water Award
- Synthetic Organic Chemistry Award
- Teamwork in Innovation
- Technician of the Year Award (Higher Education and Research)
- Technician of the Year Award (Industry)
- Tilden Prizes
- Toxicology Award
- Rising Star in Industry Award

== Discontinued awards (incomplete list) ==
- Hugo Müller Lectureship, discontinued 2008
- Solid State Chemistry Award, discontinued 2008

== See also ==
- Honorary Fellows of the Royal Society of Chemistry
