= Fred P. Lossing Award =

The Fred P. Lossing Award is awarded by the Canadian Society for Mass Spectrometry to a distinguished Canadian mass spectrometrist. The award is named after Frederick Lossing, a Canadian mass spectrometrist.

The award is made annually since 1994. Recipients of the award receive framed prints of Lake Louise by the local Canmore artist, Marilyn Kinsella.

== Recipients ==
Past recipients of the award were:

- Christoph H. Borchers (2023)
- Pierre Thibault (2019)
- Ann English (2018)
- Helene Perreault (2017)
- Mel Comisarow (2016)
- Terry McMahon (2015)
- Jim Hager (2014)
- Lars Konermann (2013)
- Joseph Banoub (2012)
- John Klassen (2011)
- Roger Guevremont (2010)
- Orval Mamer (2009)
- Paul Mayer (2008)
- Tom Covey (2007)
- Liang Li (2006)
- Michael Siu (2005)
- Bruce Thomson (2004)
- Lawrence Hogge (2003)
- Diethard Bohme (2002)
- Don Douglas (2001)
- John Holmes (2000)
- Gord McKay (1999)
- Ken Standing (1998)
- Raymond March (1997)
- Bob Boyd (1996)
- Alex Harrison (1995)
- Paul Kebarle (1994)

== See also ==
- List of chemistry awards
