= Stieglitz Lecture =

The Stieglitz Award was established in 1940 using funds from the memorial legacy of Professor Julius Stieglitz, who worked at the University of Chicago from 1892 to his death in 1937. The lecture was presented alternatively by the University of Chicago Chemistry department and the Chicago Section of the American Chemical Society in consecutive years until 1994. There was a pause in presentation from 1994 until 1999 until the funds built up to a level where they were sufficient to support a stipend of $1000 plus expenses for each year.

== Stieglitz Lecturers ==
Source: ACS Chicago Section

Lecturer	Year
Doisy, Edward A.	1940
Koch, Fred C.	1941
Marvel, Carl S.	1943
Pauling, Linus	1944
Harkins, William Draper	1945
Yost, Dan M.	1946
Wrinch, Dorothy M.	1947
du Vigneaud, Vincent	1948
Cohn, E.S.	1949
Schlesinger, Herman I.	1950
Ingold, Christopher Kelk	1950
Woodward, Robert B.	1952
Mayo, Frank R.	1953
Bartlett, Paul D.	1954
Westheimer Frank C.	1956
Hass, Henry B.	1957
Brown, Herbert C.	1958
Lardy, Henry A.	1959
Hammet, Louis P.	1960
Leonard, Nelson J.	1962
Johnson, William S.	1963
Doty, Paul	1964
Price, Charles C.	1965
Khorana, H. Gobind	1966
von Eggers Doering, William	1967
Hammond, George S.	1968
Cram, Donald J.	1969
Jerome A. Berson	1970
Djerassi, Carl	1971
Jerrold Meinwald	1972
Streitwieser, Andrew	1973
Barton, Derek H.R.	1974
Corey, E. J.	1975
Samuelsson, Bengt I.	1976
Collman, James P.	1977
Chatt, Joseph	1978
Stork, Gilbert	1979
Abeles, Robert H.	1980
Trost, Barry	1980
Hoffman, Roald	1981
Kishi, Yoshita	1982
Evans, David A.	1983
Green, Malcolm	1985
Hites, Ronald A.	1988
Ernst, Richard	1989
Olah, George Olah	1990
Whitesides, George M.	1991
Jorgensen, William L.	1992
Peter Kim	1993
Marks, Tobin J.	1994
Menger, Frederic	1999
Fowler, Joanna	2000
Gruber, Patrick R.	2002
Jacobsen, Eric	2003
Rodrigues, Eloy	2004
Smith, Amos B., III	2005
Danishefsky, Samuel	2006
Fréchet, Jean	2008
Brenneke, Joan	2008
Carreira, Erick	2010
Davis, Mark E.	2010
Ellman, Jonathan A.	2011
DeSimone, Joseph	2012
Seeman, Nadrian C.	2013
Kissling, Laura L.	2014
Meyers, Andrew G.	2015
Meade, Thomas J.	2016
Boger, Dale L.	2017
Hartwig, John F.	2022

== See also ==
- Sigmund H. Danziger Jr. Memorial Lecture in the Humanities
- List of chemistry awards
