= List of chemistry awards =

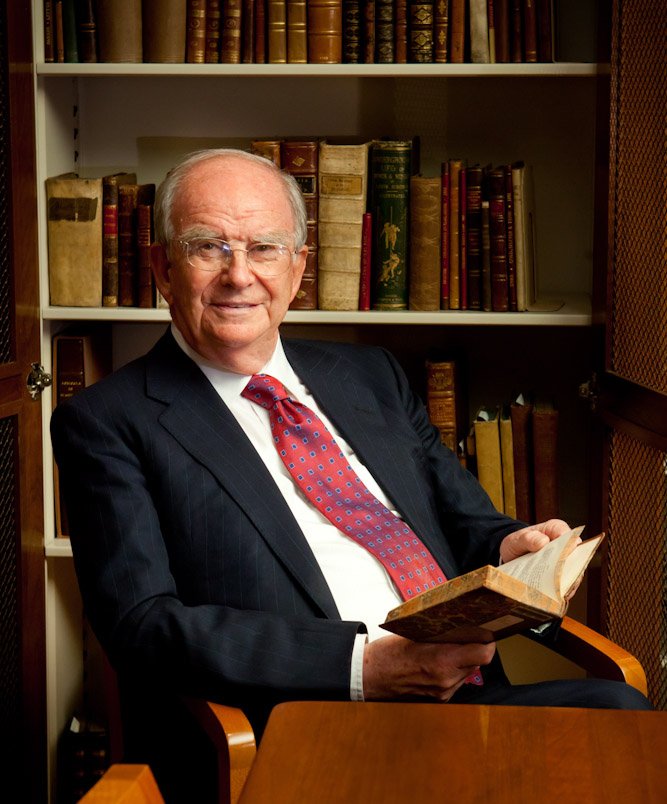
Sir John Meurig Thomas, 2011

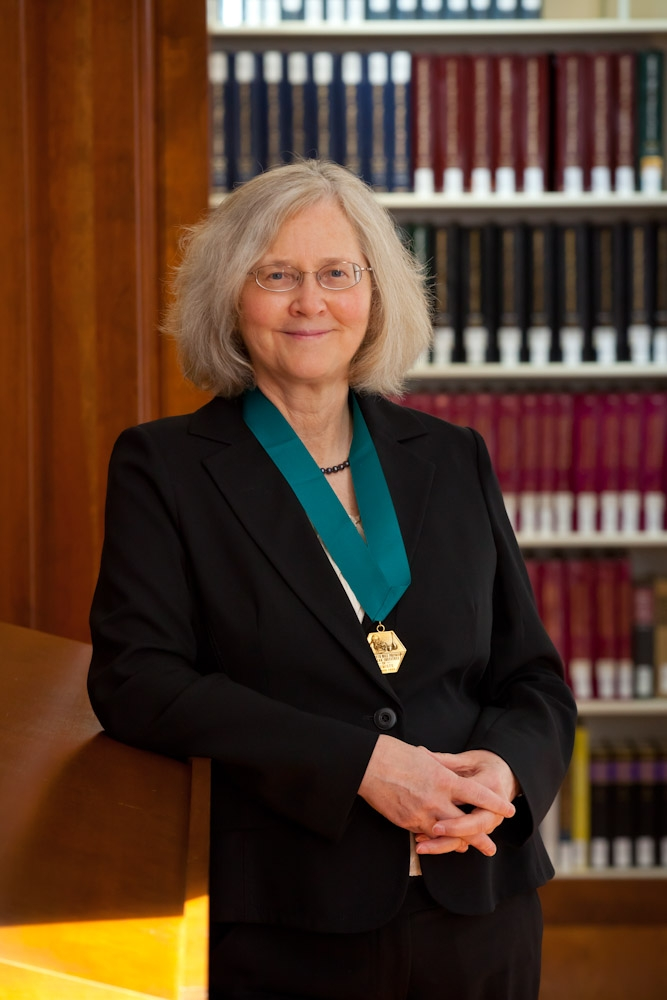
Elizabeth Blackburn with AIC Gold Medal, 2012

This list of chemistry awards is an index to articles about notable awards for chemistry. It includes awards by the Royal Society of Chemistry, the American Chemical Society, the Society of Chemical Industry and awards by other organizations.

== Awards of the Royal Society of Chemistry ==
The Royal Society of the United Kingdom offers a number of awards for chemistry.

Award	Notes
Applied Catalysis Award	Creativity and excellence in novel approaches or use of catalysis in industry
Applied Inorganic Chemistry Award	Outstanding contributions to the development of any branch of inorganic chemistry which has an application in industry
Bader Award	Prize for organic chemistry
Beilby Medal and Prize	Work that has exceptional practical significance in chemical engineering, applied materials science, energy efficiency or a related field. Jointly administered by the Institute of Materials, Minerals and Mining, the Royal Society of Chemistry and the Society of Chemical Industry, who make the award in rotation.
Bioinorganic Chemistry Award	Outstanding research in any aspect of bioinorganic chemistry
Bourke Award	Enables experts in physical chemistry or chemical physics to present their work in the UK.
Centenary Prize	Outstanding chemists, who are also exceptional communicators, from overseas
Charles Rees Award	Excellence in the field of heterocyclic chemistry
Chartered Chemist	Profession qualification for an experienced practising chemist
Corday–Morgan Prize	Meritorious contributions to experimental chemistry, including computer simulation
De Gennes Prize	Outstanding and exceptional work in the field of materials chemistry
Edward Harrison Memorial Prize	British chemist who was under 32 years, and working the fields of theoretical or physical chemistry. In 2008 the prize was joined with the Meldola Medal and Prize to form the Harrison-Meldola Memorial Prizes.
Faraday Lectureship Prize	Exceptional contributions to physical or theoretical chemistry
Faraday Medal (electrochemistry)	Distinguished mid-career electrochemists working outside of the United Kingdom and the Republic of Ireland
Geoffrey Barker Medal	Scientists working in the UK or Ireland in recognition of their contributions to electrochemistry
Gibson-Fawcett Award	Outstanding work in the field of materials chemistry
Green Chemistry Award	Advances in environmentally focused chemistry
Harrison–Meldola Memorial Prizes	Scientist who demonstrates the most meritorious and promising original investigations in chemistry and published results of those investigations
Hickinbottom Award	Contributions in the area of organic chemistry from researchers under the age of 35
Interdisciplinary Prizes	Work at the interface between chemistry and other disciplines
John B. Goodenough Award	Contributions to the field of materials chemistry
Liversidge Award	Outstanding contributions to physical chemistry
Longstaff Prize	Member of the Royal Society of Chemistry who has done the most to advance the science of chemistry
Lord Lewis Prize	Distinctive and distinguished chemical or scientific achievements together with significant contributions to the development of science policy
Ludwig Mond Award	Outstanding research in any aspect of inorganic chemistry
Marlow Award	Early-career award in physical chemistry
Materials for Industry – Derek Birchall Award	Exceptional contribution to the application of materials chemistry in industry
Meldola Medal and Prize	British chemist who was under 32 years of age for promising original investigations in chemistry (which had been published). In 2008 the prize was joined with the Edward Harrison Memorial Prize to form the Harrison-Meldola Memorial Prizes.
Nyholm Prize for Education	Outstanding achievements by those working in chemical science education, specifically major contributions to national or international research or innovation
Perkin Prize for Organic Chemistry	Sustained originality and achievement in research in any area of organic chemistry
Polanyi Medal	Outstanding contributions to the field of gas kinetics
Robert Boyle Prize for Analytical Science	Analytical chemistry
Sir George Stokes Award	Outstanding and sustained contributions to analytical science by someone working in a complementary field, which has led to developments of seminal importance to chemical analysis
Supramolecular Chemistry Award	Studies leading to the design of functionally useful supramolecular species
Tilden Prize	Advances in chemistry

== Awards of the American Chemical Society ==
The American Chemical Society of the United States offers a number of awards related to chemistry.

Award	Notes
ACS Award for Encouraging Disadvantaged Students into Careers in the Chemical Sciences	Significant accomplishments by individuals in stimulating students, underrepresented in the profession, to elect careers in the chemical sciences and engineering
ACS Award for Encouraging Women into Careers in the Chemical Sciences	Significant accomplishments by individuals who have stimulated or fostered the interest of women in chemistry, promoting their professional development as chemists or chemical engineers
ACS Award in Pure Chemistry	Fundamental research in pure chemistry carried out in North America by young men and women
Arthur C. Cope Award	Achievement in the field of organic chemistry research
Charles Goodyear Medal	Outstanding invention, innovation, or development which has resulted in a significant change or contribution to the nature of the rubber industry
Charles Lathrop Parsons Award	Outstanding public service by a member of the American Chemical Society
E. Bright Wilson Award in Spectroscopy	Outstanding accomplishments in fundamental or applied spectroscopy in chemistry
E. V. Murphree Award in Industrial and Engineering Chemistry	Outstanding research of a theoretical or experimental nature in the fields of industrial chemistry or chemical engineering
Ernest Guenther Award	Outstanding achievements in the analysis, structure elucidation, and chemical synthesis of natural products, with special consideration given to the independence of thought and originality
F.A. Cotton Medal for Excellence in Chemical Research	Texas A&M Section of the American Chemical Society to recognize accomplishments in research
Garvan–Olin Medal	Distinguished scientific accomplishment, leadership and service to chemistry by women chemists
George C. Pimentel Award in Chemical Education	Outstanding contributions to chemical education
HIST Award for Outstanding Achievement in the History of Chemistry	Outstanding career of contributions to the history of chemistry
Herman Skolnik Award	Outstanding contributions to and achievements in the theory and practice of chemical information science
Heroes of Chemistry	Creation of innovative and impactful products based on chemistry and chemical engineering
Herty Medal	Outstanding chemists resident in the Southeastern United States who have significantly contributed to their chosen fields
International Rubber Science Hall of Fame	Jointly sponsored by the Maurice Morton Institute of Polymer Science at The University of Akron and the Rubber Division of the American Chemical Society.
Irving Langmuir Award	Awarded alternate years with American Physical Society. Outstanding interdisciplinary research in chemistry and physics, in the spirit of Irving Langmuir.
James Flack Norris Award for Outstanding Achievement in the Teaching of Chemistry	Outstanding contributions to the field of chemical education
James T. Grady-James H. Stack Award for Interpreting Chemistry	Outstanding reporting on chemistry, chemical engineering, and related chemical fields
Linus Pauling Award	Outstanding achievement in chemistry
Marvin J. Johnson Award	Outstanding research contributions to microbial and biochemical technology.
Melvin Mooney Distinguished Technology Award	Individuals "who have exhibited exceptional technical competency by making significant and repeated contributions to rubber science and technology"
Murray Goodman Memorial Prize	Outstanding accomplishments in one or more of the areas of biochemistry, biophysical chemistry, biophysics, or chemical biology. The award is given by the journal Biopolymers
Nakanishi Prize	Award in chemistry given alternately by the Chemical Society of Japan and the American Chemical Society
Oesper Award	Award in chemistry given by the University of Cincinnati and the Cincinnati Section of the American Chemical Society
Patterson-Crane Award	Contributions to chemical information
Peter Debye Award	Outstanding research in physical chemistry
Priestley Medal	Distinguished service in the field of chemistry
Sparks-Thomas award	Outstanding contributions and innovations in the field of elastomers by younger scientists, technologists, and engineers
Stieglitz Lecture	Presented alternatively by the University of Chicago Chemistry department and the Chicago Section of the American Chemical Society
Tolman Award	Resident in Southern California for outstanding contributions to chemistry which include contributions in areas of fundamental studies, chemical technology, and significant contributions to chemical education or outstanding leadership in science on a national level
Ullyot Public Affairs Lecture	With Science History Institute etc. Contributions of the sciences (in particular chemistry and biology) to the public welfare
Willard Gibbs Award	Eminent chemists who, through years of application and devotion, have brought to the world developments that enable everyone to live more comfortably and to understand this world better
William H. Nichols Medal	Significant and original contribution in any field of chemistry

== Awards of the Society of Chemical Industry ==
The Society of Chemical Industry was established in 1881 by scientists, inventors and entrepreneurs. It offers a number of awards related to chemistry.

Award	Notes
The Society Medal	The society's most prestigious medal. Awarded for furthering the connection between science and business
Perkin Medal	Awarded by American Section for innovation in applied chemistry resulting in outstanding commercial development.
Chemical Industry Medal	Awarded by American Section for conspicuous service to applied chemistry.
Gordon E. Moore Medal	Awarded by American Section for early career success involving innovation in chemical industries.
Castner Medal	Awarded by Electrochemical Technology Group for applied electrochemistry or electrochemical engineering connected to industrial research
Lister Memorial Lecture	Awarded by Scotland Group
Levinstein Memorial Award	For excellence in chemical research and knowledge
Leverhulme Lecture	For excellence in chemical research and knowledge
George Bessey Award Lecture	The award recognises the efforts of dedicated and exceptional members of the society
Baekeland Lecture	For authority on polymeric materials

== Other awards ==
Country	Award	Sponsor	Notes
Australia	Le Fèvre Medal	Australian Academy of Science	Outstanding basic research in chemistry by early-career scientists
Australia	Phillip Law Postdoctoral Award for the Physical Sciences	Royal Society of Victoria	Excellence in scientific research by an early career researcher in the physical sciences
Australia	Rennie Memorial Medal	Royal Australian Chemical Institute	Person who has contributed most towards the development of some branch of chemical science
Austria	Fritz Pregl Prize	Austrian Academy of Sciences	Distinguished achievements in chemistry. No longer awarded
Austria	Haitinger Prize	Austrian Academy of Sciences	Studies in chemistry and physics that proved to be of great practical use for industrial applications
Austria	Lieben Prize	Austrian Academy of Sciences	Young scientists working in the fields of molecular biology, chemistry, or physics
Canada	Chemical Institute of Canada Medal	Chemical Institute of Canada	Person who has made an outstanding contribution to the science of chemistry or chemical engineering in Canada
Canada	Fred P. Lossing Award	Canadian Society for Mass Spectrometry	Distinguished Canadian mass spectrometrist
Canada	Rutherford Memorial Medal	Royal Society of Canada	Outstanding research in chemistry
Chile	National Prize for Natural Sciences (Chile)	CONICYT : National Prize of Chile	Natural sciences
Denmark	H. C. Ørsted Medal	The Society for the Dissemination of Natural Science, Denmark	Outstanding original scientific work in physics or chemistry
Europe	Lavoisier Medal	International Society for Biological Calorimetry	Outstanding contribution to the development and/or the application of direct calorimetry in biology and medicine
France	Médaille Lavoisier	Société chimique de France	Work or actions which have enhanced the perceived value of chemistry in society.
Germany	Alfred Stock Memorial Prize	German Chemical Society	Outstanding independent scientific experimental investigation in the field of inorganic chemistry
Germany	Bunsen–Kirchhoff Award	German Working Group for Applied Spectroscopy	Outstanding achievements in the field of analytical spectroscopy
Germany	Ernst Schering Prize	Ernst Schering Foundation	Outstanding basic research in the fields of medicine, biology or chemistry
Germany	Heinrich Wieland Prize	Boehringer Ingelheim Foundation	Outstanding research on biologically active molecules and systems in the areas of chemistry, biochemistry and physiology as well as their clinical importance
Germany	Klung Wilhelmy Science Award	Otto Klung and Dr. Wilhelmy Foundations	Outstanding German scientists in chemistry or physics under the age of 40
Germany	Liebig Medal	German Chemical Society	Outstanding achievements in the entire field of chemistry
Germany	Otto Hahn Medal	Max Planck Society	Outstanding scientific achievement by junior scientists
Germany	Otto Hahn Prize	German Chemical Society, German Physical Society and city of Frankfurt	Outstanding achievement in the field of chemistry, physics or applied engineering science
India	Infosys Prize in Physical Sciences	Infosys Science Foundation	Scientists, researchers, engineers and social scientists of Indian Origin
India	VASVIK Industrial Research Award	VASVIK	Excellence in industrial research in the areas of science and technology
International	Edison Award	Edison Awards	Honoring excellence in innovation
International	International Chemistry Olympiad	International Science Olympiad	Academic competition for high school students
Israel	Sackler Prize	Tel Aviv University	Young scientists who have made outstanding and fundamental contributions in physics or chemistry
Israel	Wolf Prize in Chemistry	Wolf Foundation	Chemistry
Italy	Alfredo di Braccio Award	Accademia dei Lincei	Chemistry
Italy	Chirality Medal	Italian Chemical Society	Distinguished contribution to all aspects of chirality
Italy	Luigi Galvani Medal	Italian Chemical Society	Work of foreign scientists in the field of electrochemistry
Japan	Ryoji Noyori Prize	Society of Synthetic Organic Chemistry	Outstanding contributions to research in asymmetric synthetic chemistry defined in its broadest sense
Netherlands	OPCW–The Hague Award	Organisation for the Prohibition of Chemical Weapons	Individuals and institutions that have significantly contributed towards the goal of a world free of chemical weapons
Netherlands	Tetrahedron Prize	Elsevier	Creativity in organic chemistry or bioorganic and medicinal chemistry
New Zealand	Hector Medal	Royal Society Te Apārangi	Outstanding contribution to the advancement of chemical sciences; physical sciences; or mathematical and information sciences
Pakistan	Abdus Salam Award	International Centre for Theoretical Physics Pakistan chapter	Scientists resident in Pakistan, below 35 years of age, in chemistry, mathematics, physics, biology
Poland	Kołos Medal	University of Warsaw and the Polish Chemical Society	Distinction in theoretical or experimental physical chemistry
Poland	Marie Curie Medal	Polish Chemical Society	Significant contributions in the field of chemistry
Russia	Demidov Prize	Russian Academy of Sciences	Outstanding achievements in natural sciences and humanities
Russia	Lebedev Prize	Russian Academy of Sciences	Outstanding work in the field of chemistry and technology of synthetic rubber and other synthetic polymers
Sweden	Gregori Aminoff Prize	Royal Swedish Academy of Sciences	Contribution in the field of crystallography, including areas concerned with the dynamics of the formation and dissolution of crystal structures. Some preference should be shown for work evincing elegance in the approach to the problem
Sweden	Nobel Prize in Chemistry	Royal Swedish Academy of Sciences	Outstanding contributions in chemistry
Switzerland	Paul Karrer Gold Medal	University of Zurich	Outstanding researcher in the field of chemistry
Switzerland	Tu Youyou Award	MDPI	US$100,000 award honoring excellence in natural products and medicinal chemistry
United Kingdom	Aston Medal	British Mass Spectrometry Society	Outstanding contributions to our understanding of the biological, chemical, engineering, mathematical, medical, or physical sciences relating directly to mass spectrometry
United Kingdom	Beit Memorial Fellowships for Medical Research	Beit Memorial Fellowship	British biomedical science. Replaced by Wellcome–Beit Prize Fellowships in 2009
United Kingdom	Copley Medal	Royal Society	Outstanding achievements in research in any branch of science
United Kingdom	Davy Medal	Royal Society	Outstandingly important recent discovery in any branch of chemistry
United Kingdom	Melchett Medal	Energy Institute	Outstanding contributions to the science of fuel and energy
United States	Agnes Fay Morgan Research Award	Iota Sigma Pi	Research achievement in chemistry or biochemistry to a woman not over forty years of age
United States	American Institute of Chemists Gold Medal	American Institute of Chemists, Science History Institute	Person who has most encouraged the science of chemistry or the profession of chemist or chemical engineer in the United States of America
United States	Biemann Medal	American Society for Mass Spectrometry	Individual early in his or her career in recognition of significant achievement in basic or applied mass spectrometry
United States	Bristol-Myers Squibb Awards	Bristol-Meyers Squibb Foundation	Distinguished achievements in fields such as cancer, infectious disease, neuroscience, nutrition, and cardiovascular disease
United States	Chemical Industry Medal	Society of Chemical Industry	Person making a valuable application of chemical research to industry. Primary consideration shall be given to applications in the public interest
United States	Chemical Pioneer Award	American Institute of Chemists	Chemists or chemical engineers who have made outstanding contributions to advances in chemistry or the chemical profession
United States	Dreyfus Prize in the Chemical Sciences	The Camille and Henry Dreyfus Foundation	Chemistry research and education
United States	Earle K. Plyler Prize for Molecular Spectroscopy	American Physical Society	Notable contributions to the field of molecular spectroscopy and dynamics
United States	Edward Goodrich Acheson Award	Electrochemical Society	Conspicuous contribution to the advancement of the objectives, purposes, and activities of the society (ECS)
United States	Gabor A. Somorjai Award for Creative Research in Catalysis	Gabor A. and Judith K. Somorjai Endowment Fund	Outstanding research in the field of catalysis
United States	Glenn T. Seaborg Medal	University of California, Los Angeles	Exceptional scientific contributions in the fields of chemistry or biochemistry
United States	Gordon E. Moore Medal	Society of Chemical Industry (America Section)	Early career success involving innovation in chemical industries
United States	Gordon E. Moore Medal for Outstanding Achievement in Solid State Science and Technology	Electrochemical Society	Outstanding contributions to solid-state science and technology
United States	International Palladium Medal	Société de Chimie Industrielle (American Section)	Outstanding contributions to the chemical industry on an international level
United States	Lavoisier Medal	DuPont	DuPont scientists and engineers who have made outstanding contributions to DuPont and their scientific fields throughout their careers
United States	NAS Award for Chemistry in Service to Society	National Academy of Sciences	Contributions to chemistry, either in fundamental science or its application, that clearly satisfy a societal need
United States	NAS Award in Chemical Sciences	National Academy of Sciences	Innovative research in the chemical sciences that in the broadest sense contributes to a better understanding of the natural sciences and to the benefit of humanity
United States	Norman Hackerman Award in Chemical Research	Robert A. Welch Foundation	Work of young researchers in Texas.
United States	Norman Hackerman Young Author Award	Electrochemical Society	Best paper published in the Journal of the Electrochemical Society for a topic in the field of electrochemical science and technology by a young author or authors
United States	Olin Palladium Award	Electrochemical Society	Outstanding contributions to the fundamental understanding of all types of electrochemical and corrosion phenomena and processes.
United States	Othmer Gold Medal	Science History Institute etc.	Outstanding individuals who contributed to progress in chemistry and science through their activities in areas including innovation, entrepreneurship, research, education, public understanding, legislation, and philanthropy
United States	Percy L. Julian Award	National Organization for the Professional Advancement of Black Chemists and Chemical Engineers (NOBCChE)	Black scientists who have made significant contributions in pure and/or applied research in science or engineering
United States	Perkin Medal	Society of Chemical Industry (America Section)	Innovation in applied chemistry resulting in outstanding commercial development
United States	Petrochemical Heritage Award	Founders Club, Science History Institute	Outstanding contributions to the petrochemical community
United States	Pittcon Heritage Award	Pittsburgh Conference on Analytical Chemistry and Applied Spectroscopy, Science History Institute	Outstanding individuals whose entrepreneurial careers shaped the instrumentation and laboratory supplies community
United States	Remington Medal	American Pharmacists Association	Distinguished service on behalf of American pharmacy
United States	Richard J. Bolte Sr. Award	Science History Institute	Outstanding contributions by a leader who provides products or services vital to the continuing growth and development of the chemical and molecular sciences community
United States	Neville Prize	Science History Institute	Biographical work in the field of chemistry or molecular science
United States	Sloan Research Fellowship	Alfred P. Sloan Foundation	Early-career scientists and scholars
United States	Wayne B. Nottingham Prize	Physical Electronics Conference	Best student paper presented at the conference
United States	Welch Award in Chemistry	Robert A. Welch Foundation	Basic chemical research for the benefit of mankind
United States	Williams–Wright Award	Coblentz Society	Extraordinary or outstanding work in spectroscopic measurements while working in an industrial setting
United States	Winthrop-Sears Medal,	The Chemists' Club, Science History Institute	Entrepreneurial achievement in the chemical industry for the betterment of humanity

== See also ==
- Lists of awards
- Lists of science and technology awards
- List of biochemistry awards
