= Lebedev (disambiguation) =

Lebedev is a Russian surname.

Lebedev may also refer to:

- Lebedev (crater), crater on the far side of the Moon
- Lebedev Institute of Precision Mechanics and Computer Engineering
- Lebedev Physical Institute
- Lebedev process, production of butadiene
- Lebedev quadrature, an approximation to the surface integral
- Pyotr Lebedev (research vessel)
- 2342 Lebedev, minor planet
- Lebedev pistol
- Lebedev Prize
