= David Britt =

David Britt may refer to:

- David M. Britt (1917–2009), North Carolina politician and jurist
- R. David Britt, American professor of chemistry
