= Lossing =

Lossing is a surname. Notable people with this name include:

- Benson John Lossing (1813–1891), American historian, publisher, journalist, engraver, and antiquarian
- Frederick Lossing (1915–1998), Canadian chemist and mass spectrometrist
- John Lossing Buck (1890–1975), American agricultural economist and Presbyterian missionary; spouse of author Pearl S. Buck
