= Stephen Mann (chemist) =

British chemist

- Born: Stephen Mann; 1 April 1955 (age 71)
- Education: University of Oxford (DPhil) University of Manchester Institute of Science and Technology (BSc)
- Awards: Corday-Morgan Medal(RSC, 1991); Interdisciplinary Award (RSC, 1999); FRSC(1996); FRS (2003); Joseph Chatt Medal (RSC, 2006); de Gennes Medal (RSC, 2011); SCF French-British Prize (2011); Royal Society Davy Medal (2016)
- Scientific career
- Fields: Chemistry; Biomineralization; Biomimetics; Nanoscience; Protocells
- Workplaces: University of Bristol University of Bath University of Oxford Shanghai Jiao Tong University
- Thesis: Intravesicular Solids in Chemical and Biological Systems (1982)
- Doctoral advisor: R. J. P. Williams
- Website: http://www.stephenmann.co.uk

Stephen Mann, FRS, FRSC, (born 1 April 1955) is Professor of Chemistry, co-director of the Max Planck Bristol Centre for Minimal Biology, director of the Centre for Organized Matter Chemistry, director of the Centre for Protolife Research, and was principal of the Bristol Centre for Functional Nanomaterials at the University of Bristol, UK.

== Education ==
Mann was awarded a Bachelor of Science degree in Chemistry from the University of Manchester Institute of Science and Technology in 1976, and a Doctor of Philosophy degree from the University of Oxford in 1982 under the supervision of Professor R. J. P. Williams FRS.

== Career ==
Following his Doctor of Philosophy degree, Mann was elected to a junior research fellowship at Keble College, University of Oxford, and then awarded a lectureship at the University of Bath in 1984 where he was appointed to a full professorship in 1990. He moved to the University of Bristol in 1998.

== Research ==
Mann's research is concerned with the chemical synthesis, characterization and emergence of complex forms of organized matter. His research activities include biomineralization, biomimetic materials chemistry, synthesis and self-assembly of nanoscale objects, functional nanomaterials, complexity and emergent behaviour in hybrid nanostructures, and solvent-free liquid proteins. His current work is focused on the design and construction of synthetic protocells. Mann has published over 550 scientific papers with a current h-index of 125 and over 64,000 citations. He is listed in the 2014 Thomson Reuters index of world's most influential scientific minds and in the top 0.01% of cited scientists.

== Awards and honours ==
Mann was elected a Fellow of the Royal Society, UK in 2003. Other accolades include:

- Corday-Morgan Medal and Prize, Royal Society of Chemistry, 1991.
- Fellow Royal Society of Chemistry, 1996.
- Max-Planck Society/Alexander von Humboldt Foundation Research Award, 1998–2003.
- Interdisciplinary Award, Royal Society of Chemistry, 1999.
- Joseph Chatt Lecture and Medal, Royal Society of Chemistry, 2006.
- de Gennes Prize and Medal, Royal Society of Chemistry, 2011.
- French-British Prize, Chemical Society of France, 2011.
- Royal Society Davy Medal (2016).
- Member of Academia Europaea (2020).
