= Ann English =

Canadian bioinorganic chemist

Ann Marie English
- Education: McGill University; University College Dublin
- Known for: Bioinorganic Chemistry; Mass Spectrometry
- Scientific career
- Workplaces: Concordia University
- Thesis: Spectral Studies on Group VIB Metal Chalcocarbonyls (1980)
- Doctoral advisor: Ian S. Butler

Ann Marie English is an Irish Canadian scientist in bioinorganic chemistry and redox biology, recognized for her contribution to chemistry in Canada.

== Education ==
English received a BSc from University College Dubin in Ireland in 1971 and a PhD in Inorganic Chemistry from McGill University in Canada in 1980.

== Career ==
After graduation, English did post-doctoral research at California Institute of Technology as a research fellow in chemistry. Under the direction of Harry B. Gray, she conducted research on electron transfer of copper proteins. She began her academic career at Concordia University as assistant professor in 1982 and was promoted to full professor in 1994. Since 2018, she is Distinguished Professor Emerita and Honorary Concordia University Research Chair in the Department of Chemistry and Biochemistry at Concordia University. She has mentored over 55 graduate students and 37 postdoctoral fellows and researchers.

Her research field is in heme-protein chemistry and biochemistry, including the effects of metal-induced oxidation on aging at the cellular level. She has published over 130 peer-reviewed journal articles and book chapters. With mass spectrometry being one of the techniques used in her research, she established the Centre for Biological Applications of Mass Spectrometry in 2003.

She was elected as Fellow of the Chemical Institute of Canada in 2014 and Fellow of the Royal Society of Canada Academy of Science in 2024.

== Awards ==
- 2024 Eraldo Antonini Award, a Lifetime Achievement Award from the Society of Porphyrins and Phthalocyanines
- 2018 Fred P. Lossing Award from the Canadian Society for Mass Spectrometry
- 2018 Award for Graduate Mentoring from Concordia University
- 2017 Clara Benson Award from the Canadian Society for Chemistry
