= Martin Classical Lectures =

The Martin Classical Lectures is a function of the Charles Beebe Martin Foundation established at Oberlin College in Ohio.

Charles Beebe Martin was a professor of Classics and classical archaeology at the College from 1880 to 1925. The foundation was set up to honor his memory.

== Works produced by the foundation ==
Lectures given at the foundation are collected and presented in volumes. Dates given are those of publication.

=== Volumes published by Harvard University Press ===
- Volume 1, Louis E. Lord (1931)
- Volume 2 Aspects of Social Behavior in Ancient Rome, Tenney Frank (1932)
- Volume 3 Attic Vase-painting, Charles Seltman (1933)
- Volume 4 Humanistic Value of Archaeology Rhys Carpenter (1933)
- Volume 5 Greek Ideals and Modern Life, Sir. R. W. Livingstone (1935)
- Volume 6 Five men; character studies from the Roman Empire, by Martin Percival (M. P.) Charlesworth (1936)
- Volume 7 Early Greek elegists, Cecil Maurice (C. M.) Bowra (1938)
- Volume 8 The Roman art of war under the republic, Frank E. Adcock (1940)
- Volume 9 Epigraphica attica, Benjamin Dean Meritt (1940)
- Volume 10 Archaic Attic gravestones, Gisela M. A. Richter (1944)
- Volume 11 Greek personality in archaic sculpture, Georg Heinrich Karo (1948)
- Volume 12 Thucydides and the world war, Louis E. Lord (1945)
- Volume 13 Classical influences in Renaissance literature, Douglas Bush (1952)
- Volume 14 Pindar and Aeschylus, John Huston Finley (1955)
- Volume 15 Classics and Renaissance thought, Paul Oskar Kristeller (1955) and as Renaissance thought, the classic, scholastic and humanist strains (1961)
- Volume 16 Ancient book illumination, Kurt Weitzmann (1959)
- Volume 17 Boundaries of Dionysus; Athenian foundations for the theory of tragedy, Alfred Cary Schlesinger (1963)
- Volume 18 Society and civilization in Greece and Rome, Victor Ehrenberg (1964)
- Volume 19 Aristophanes and the comic hero, Cedric H. Whitman (1964)
- Volume 20 Origin and early form of Greek tragedy, Gerald Else (1965)
- Volume 21 The meaning of Stoicism, Ludwig Edelstein (1966)
- Volume 22 Rubens and the classical tradition, Wolfgang Stechow (1968)
- Volume 23 The Athenian aristocracy, 399 to 31 B.C., Paul Lachlan MacKendrick (1969)
- Volume 24 Thucydides on the nature of power, A. G. (Arthur Geoffrey) Woodhead (1970)
- Volume 25 Isis among the Greeks and Romans, Friedrich Solmsen (1979)
- Volume 26 Tragedy and civilization : an interpretation of Sophocles, Charles Segal (1981)
- Volume 27 Aristotle and the Renaissance, Charles B. Schmitt (1983)
- Volume 28 Herodotean narrative and discourse, Mabel Lang (1984)
- Volume 29 The art of Bacchylides, Anne Pippin Burnett (1985)
- Volume 30 Homer and the Nibelungenlied : comparative studies in epic style Bernard Fenik (1986)

=== Volumes published by Princeton University Press ===
- Man in the middle voice: name and narration in the Odyssey, John Peradotto (1990)

== See also ==
- Sigmund H. Danziger Jr. Memorial Lecture in the Humanities: University of Chicago
