= Robin Clark (chemist) =

New Zealand chemist (1935–2018)

Robin Clark CNZM FRS
- Born: Robin Jon Hawes Clark; 16 February 1935; Rangiora, New Zealand
- Died: 16 December 2018 (aged 83); London, England
- Education: Canterbury University College; University College London
- Known for: Transition metal and mixed-valence complexes
- Awards: Bakerian Medal (2008); CNZM (2004); FRS (1990)
- Scientific career
- Fields: Inorganic chemistry
- Workplaces: University College London
- Thesis: Some Studies in the Chemistry of Titanium Complexes (1961)
- Doctoral advisors: Ronald Sydney Nyholm; Jack Lewis
- Other academic advisors: William Fyfe
- Doctoral students: Richard J. Puddephatt

Robin Jon Hawes Clark CNZM FRS (16 February 1935 – 6 December 2018) was a New Zealand-born chemist initially noted for research of transition metal and mixed-valence complexes, and later for the use of Raman spectroscopy in determining the chemical composition of pigments used in artworks.

== Early life and education ==
Clark was born in Rangiora, New Zealand on 16 February 1935, to parents Reginald Hawes Clark and Marjorie Alice Clark. He attended Marlborough College, Blenheim, and Christ's College, Christchurch before pursuing bachelor's and master's at Canterbury University College. Clark was a research and teaching fellow under William Fyfe at the University of Otago in 1958. From 1958 to 1961, Clark worked toward a doctorate advised by Ronald Sydney Nyholm and Jack Lewis at University College London and was awarded a PhD degree for his work on titanium complexes in 1961. The University of London later awarded Clark a DSc in 1969.

== Career ==
Clark began teaching at University College London in 1962 as an assistant lecturer. He was appointed Sir William Ramsay Professor in 1989, and served until retirement in 2009. He served as the dean of science from 1988 to 1989 and later as head of the chemistry department from 1989 to 1999.

Clark died in London on 6 December 2018.

=== Artwork authentication ===
In 1992, Clark was asked to develop a non-destructive technique to analyze the chemical composition of a painting in such a way to be able to spot art forgeries. He had since developed the use of Raman spectroscopy as an important tool for use in the fields of artwork authentication, conservation, and preservation.

== Awards and honours ==
Over the course of his career, Clark delivered several named lectures and received multiple awards. In 1969, he was elected a fellow of the Royal Society of Chemistry. In 1989, he was granted honorary fellowship by the Royal Society of New Zealand. He became a fellow of the Royal Society of London and member of the Academia Europaea in 1990. Two years later, he was elected a fellow of University College London and the Royal Society of Arts, and in 2001 he was conferred with an honorary DSc by the University of Canterbury. Clark was appointed a Companion of the New Zealand Order of Merit in the 2004 Queen's Birthday Honours, for services to science and New Zealand interests in the United Kingdom, followed by elections as a foreign fellow of the National Academy of Sciences, India in 2007 and as an international member of the American Philosophical Society in 2010. In 2009, Royal Society of Chemistry awarded Clark the Sir George Stokes Award for his contribution to the application of analytical science to the arts and archaeology through his development of Raman microscopy for the identification of pigments.

== Selected works ==
- Clark, Robin J.H.; Williams, Charles S. (1965). "The far-infrared spectra of metal-halide complexes of pyridine and related ligands". Inorganic Chemistry. 4 (3): 350–357. doi:10.1021/ic50025a020.
- Bell, Ian M.; Clark, Robin J.H.; Gibbs, Peter J. (1997). "Raman spectroscopic library of natural and synthetic pigments (pre-~ 1850 AD)". Spectrochimica Acta Part A: Molecular and Biomolecular Spectroscopy. 53 (12): 2159–2179. doi:10.1016/S1386-1425(97)00140-6. PMID 9437873.
- Burgio, Lucia; Clark, Robin J.H. (2001). "Library of FT-Raman spectra of pigments, minerals, pigment media and varnishes, and supplement to existing library of Raman spectra of pigments with visible excitation". Spectrochimica Acta Part A: Molecular and Biomolecular Spectroscopy. 57 (7): 1491–1521. Bibcode:2001AcSpA..57.1491B. doi:10.1016/s1386-1425(00)00495-9. PMID 11446703.
- Clark, Robin J. H.; Dines, Trevor J. (1986). "Resonance Raman Spectroscopy, and Its Application to Inorganic Chemistry". Angewandte Chemie International Edition in English. 25 (2): 131–158. doi:10.1002/anie.198601311. ISSN 0570-0833.
