= Douglas Stephan =

Canadian chemist (born 1953)

Douglas W. Stephan FRS FRSC FRSC OC
- Born: Douglas Wade Stephan
- Education: McMaster University (BSc); University of Western Ontario (PhD)
- Known for: Frustrated Lewis pairs
- Awards: Humboldt Prize (2002); Applied Catalysis Award (2014)
- Scientific career
- Fields: Chemistry
- Workplaces: University of Toronto
- Thesis: Studies in asymmetric synthesis (1980)
- Doctoral advisor: Nicholas C. Payne
- Website: www.chem.utoronto.ca/staff/DSTEPHAN/

Douglas Wade Stephan FRS FRSC FRSC OC is professor of Chemistry at the University of Toronto, a post he has held since 2008.

== Education ==
Stephan was educated at McMaster University where he was awarded a Bachelor of Science degree in 1976 and the University of Western Ontario where he was awarded a PhD in 1981 for research investigating enantioselective synthesis supervised by Nicholas C. Payne. Stephan was also a NATO PDF with Dick Holm at Harvard from 1980 to 1982.

== Research and career ==
Stephan's work uses fundamental studies to develop new methods for producing useful chemical products. He is best known for his work on frustrated Lewis pairs, which has enabled the development of metal-free methods of hydrogenation catalysis. Stephan has also devised new approaches for the activation of small molecules such as alkynes and olefins. Other highlights include research on compounds that contain both early and late transition elements, and studies of the chemistry of both zirconium–phosphorus complexes and catalytic phosphorus–phosphorus bonds. In his early career, Stephan's work provided new insights and understanding of ligand design and synthesis for reactivity and catalysis. In the 1980s and 1990s, his work focused on synthesis and applications of "early-late" heterobimetallic complexes, zirconium-phosphorus and titanium-sulfur chemistry. In the mid-1990s, Stephan discovered a new class of olefin polymerization catalysts, that was commercialized in NOVA Chemical's plant in Joffre, Alberta, Canada, the largest solution polymerization plant in the world. This development placed Stephan as one of a handful of chemists worldwide whose fundamental advances have translated to commercial success, widespread use and impact.

=== Awards and honours ===
Prof. Stephan has received considerable recognition for his work including the 2001 Alcan Award (top award for Canadian inorganic chemistry). He received an Av Humboldt Foundation Senior Research Award in 2002, the 2003 NSERC Synergy Award, the 2004 Ciapetta Lectureship Award from the North American Catalysis Soc., and the 2005 LeSueur Memorial Award from the Canadian Soc. Chemical Industry, 2005. He was appointed as a Fellow of the Royal Society of Canada in 2005. Stephan was also appointed to a Canada Research Chair at Windsor in 2005 and in Toronto in 2008 and reappointed in 2015. He has been awarded a Killam Research Fellowship (2009–2011), a re-invitation from the Humboldt Foundation for a Senior Research Award (2011) and the Ludwig Mond Award and Lectureship (Royal Soc. Chemistry UK, 2012), and the 2013 H.M. Tory Medal from the Royal Society of Canada. In 2013, he was elected a Fellow of the Royal Society (London). In 2014, he was elected a Corresponding Member of North-Rhein-Westfalia Academy of the Sciences and Arts (Germany) and was awarded the Applied Catalysis Award (Royal Society of Chemistry, UK), Canadian Green Chemistry, and Engineering Award, and CIC Medal (Chemical Institute of Canada). In 2015, he was a distinguished adjunct professor, at King Abdulaziz University and became only the second chemist to be named an Einstein Visiting Fellow at Technische Universität Berlin for 2016–2019. He was on the Thompson-Reuters "Highly Cited Researcher" in 2014-2019 and was named to the 2015 list of "Most Influential Scientific Minds." In 2019, he was awarded the Steacie Award (Chemical Institute of Canada) and the Polanyi Award from NSERC of Canada. In 2020 he was named Zhedong Scholar Chair Professor at Ningbo University and received a Guggenheim Fellowship from the Guggenheim Foundation and in 2021 he received the Killam Prize in Natural Sciences from the Canada Council for the Arts and a Centenary Prize from the Royal Society of Chemistry in the UK and in 2022 he received the F.A. Cotton Award in Synthetic Inorganic Chemistry from the American Chemical Society. In 2023, he was named to the endowed John C. Polanyi Chair of Chemistry at the University of Toronto.

In 2024, he was appointed an officer of the Order of Canada. In 2026 he was awarded the Davy Medal for chemistry from the Royal Society in the UK. He currently lives in Toronto.
