= Richard J. Puddephatt =

British academic (born 1943)

Richard Puddephatt OC FRSC FCIC
- Born: Richard John Puddephatt; 1943 (age 82–83); Aylesbury, England
- Education: University of London, University College London
- Awards: Order of Canada (2007); Fellow of the Royal Society (1998)
- Scientific career
- Fields: Organometallic chemistry
- Workplaces: University of Western Ontario
- Doctoral advisors: Alwyn G. Davies, Robin J. H. Clark
- Website: uwo.ca/chem/people/faculty/puddephatt.htm

Richard John Puddephatt, OC FRSC FCIC was born 1943 in Aylesbury, England. He is a distinguished university professor in the department of chemistry at the University of Western Ontario, in London, Ontario, Canada. Richard is a former holder of a Canada research chair in material synthesis. He has been studying the fundamental chemistry of gold and other precious metals in the development of new materials for potential applications in health care and electronics. Puddephatt's research interests involve organometallic chemistry related to catalysis and materials science, and he is considered a world expert on platinum and gold chemistry. He has authored two books: The Chemistry of Gold and The Periodic Table of Elements.

== Education ==
- Penn and Tylers Green Primary School
- High Wycombe Royal Grammar School
- BSc from the University of London in 1965
- PhD from University College London in 1968

== Research and career ==
Puddephatt has conducted research on synthesis, reactivity and elucidation of mechanisms in the organometallic chemistry of the noble metals, particularly related to the role of organometallic compounds in catalysis and in materials science. He has elucidated the mechanisms of reactions in many homogenous catalytic processes, foe instance in studies of oxidative addition and reductive elimination with alkylplatinum and alkyl–gold complexes and of skeletal rearrangements of metallacyclobutane complexes, often called the Puddephatt rearrangement.

Coordinatively unsaturated platinum clusters and platinum–rhenium clusters have been synthesised and shown to be excellent mimics of the surface reactivity, related to heterogeneous catalysis by supported platinum and bimetallic platinum–rhenium catalysts. Commercially useful organometallic precursors for chemical vapour deposition (CVD) of thin films of metals such as palladium, platinum, silver and gold have been discovered and the mechanisms of those CVD processes elucidated. He has also synthesised catenanes and metal-containing polymers by dynamic ring opening polymerisation.

He is a joint world record holder of having made the tightest knotted structure, which comprises a loop of 54 atoms entwined in a trefoil knot.

== Awards and honours ==
Puddephatt was won numerous awards including

- Officer of the Order of Canada
- Distinguished University Professor
- Elected a Fellow of the Royal Society, FRS in 1998
- Fellow of the Royal Society of Canada, FRSC
- Canada Research Chair
- Bucke Science Prize and Hellmuth Prize, University of Western Ontario
- Alcan Award and E.W.R. Steacie Award of the Chemical Society of Canada
- CIC Medal of the Chemical Institute of Canada
- Nyholm Lecture Award and Award for Chemistry of the Noble Metals of the Royal Society of Chemistry
- E.G. Pleva Teaching Award
- NSERC Award of Excellence (2001)
