= Frederick Lossing =

Canadian chemist

- Born: August 10, 1915; Norwich, Canada
- Died: May 22, 1998; Ottawa, Canada
- Education: University of Western Ontario; McGill University
- Known for: Mass spectrometry
- Scientific career
- Fields: Analytical chemistry, mass spectrometry
- Workplaces: National Research Council
- Thesis: The preparation and properties of S_{2}F_{10} (1942)

Frederick Pettit Lossing (1915-1998) was a Canadian chemist at the National Research Council in Ottawa. He was a prolific scientist and is mainly known for his contributions to mass spectrometry, the Fred P. Lossing Award awarded by the Canadian Society for Mass Spectrometry is named after him.

Lossing was born in Norwich and studied at the University of Western Ontario and obtained a PhD from McGill University in 1942. In 1946 he joined the National Research Council in Ottawa where he worked until his retirement in 1980. His work included measurements of the ionization energies of free radicals and thermochemistry.

== Awards and honors ==
- Fellow of the Royal Society of Canada (1956)
- The Fred P. Lossing Award is named after him.
