= Eugenia Kumacheva =

Canadian chemist (born 1955)

Eugenia Kumacheva OC FRS FRSC
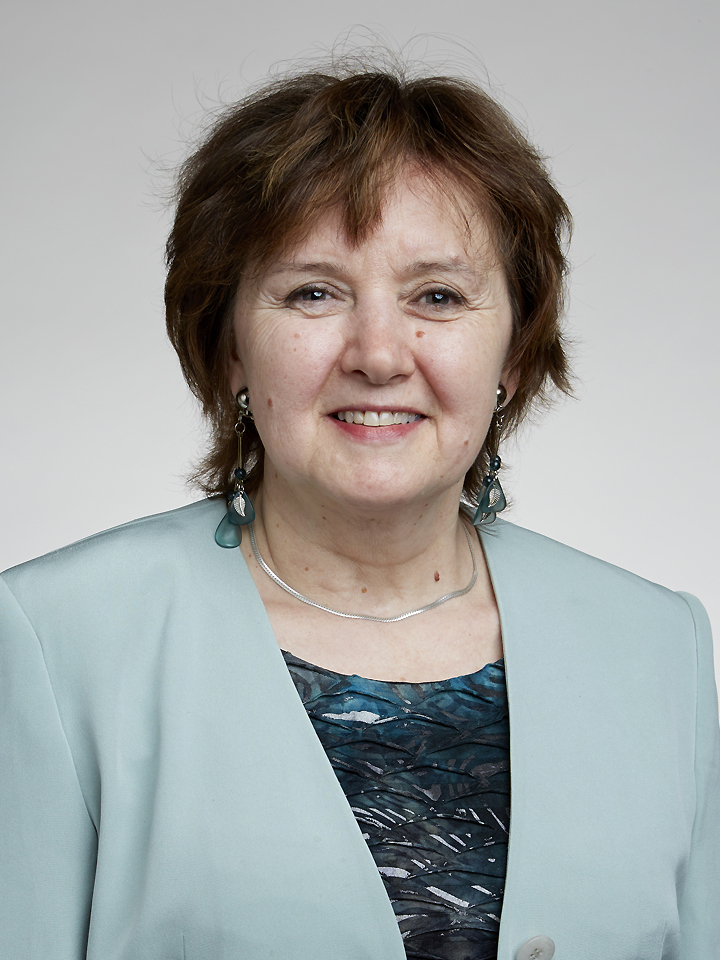
- Kumacheva in 2016
- Born: 1955 (age 70–71); Odesa, Ukrainian SSR, Soviet Union
- Education: Saint Petersburg State Institute of Technology (BSc, MSc); Russian Academy of Sciences (PhD)
- Awards: L'Oréal-UNESCO For Women in Science Award (2008); Canada Research Chair
- Scientific career
- Fields: Chemistry; Materials science Polymers; Microfluidics; Nanoscience
- Institutions: University of Toronto; Weizmann Institute of Science; Moscow State University
- Website: www.chem.utoronto.ca/staff/EK

Eugenia Eduardovna Kumacheva OC FRS FRSC (Russian: Евгения Эдуардовна Кумачева; born 1955) is a University Professor and Distinguished Professor of Chemistry at the University of Toronto. Her research interests span across the fields of fundamental and applied polymers science, nanotechnology, microfluidics, and interface chemistry. She was awarded the L'Oréal-UNESCO Awards for Women in Science in 2008 "for the design and development of new materials with many applications including targeted drug delivery for cancer treatments and materials for high density optical data storage". In 2011, she published a book on the Microfluidic Reactors for Polymer Particles co-authored with Piotr Garstecki. She is Canadian Research Chair in Advanced Polymer Materials (Tier 1). She is Fellow of the Royal Society (FRS) and a Fellow of the Royal Society of Canada (FRSC).

== Education and early life ==
Eugenia Kumacheva was born in Odesa, Soviet Union. After earning her undergraduate degree (cum laude) from the Technical University in St. Petersburg, she worked in industry for several years before beginning her Ph.D. research. In 1986, she was awarded her Ph.D. degree in physical chemistry of polymers in the Institute of Physical Chemistry Russian Academy of Sciences.

== Career and research ==
Eugenia then worked as a staff scientist at the Moscow State University before beginning her postdoctoral fellowship supported by Minerva Foundation with Professor Jacob Klein at the Weizmann Institute of Science in Israel. She then joined the research lab of Professor Mitch Winnik at the University of Toronto in Canada to study multicomponent polymer systems. In 1996, Kumacheva became an assistant professor in the Department of Chemistry at the University of Toronto, and in 2005, she was promoted to the ranks of Full Professor. Eugenia has published 2 books, 10 book chapters, and 305 papers with >70 citations/paper. She holds 40 patents and is a founder of two companies FlowJEM and KuBE Materials Solutions. She has given >300 invited, keynote and plenary lectures, as well as public lectures. In 2008, she was the first Canadian recipient of the L'Oréal-UNESCO "Women in Science" Prize. In 2016, she was elected a Fellow of the Royal Society. In 2017, she was awarded a CIC medal "presented as a mark of distinction and recognition to a person who has made an outstanding contribution to the science of chemistry or chemical engineering in Canada, this is the CIC’s top award." In 2020, Eugenia was appointed by The Governor General of Canada as an Officer to the Order of Canada for “her contributions to chemistry, notably through microfluidics and polymer research, and for her efforts as an advocate for women in science".

Eugenia Kumacheva's work focuses on polymer science, nanoscience, microfluidics, and interface chemistry. She is strongly interested in research with biological applications. Recently, she became involved in the use artificial intelligence (machine learning) for materials synthesis and fabrication. Eugenia Kumacheva has been involved in modeling the biological conditions of myocardial infarctions, strokes, pulmonary embolism, and various other blood related disorders or health conditions using polymers and nanomaterials. She explored the potential of microbubbles, a gas enclosed by a natural or synthetic polymer for both diagnostic and therapeutic applications such as targeted drug delivery and molecular imaging. An additional medical application of Kumacheva's work is the creation of hydrogels and various other chemical environments to either support the life of a stem cell, affect necrotic heart tissue as well as deter the metastasis of cancer cells. Kumacheva has made strong contributions in the area of self-assembly of nanoparticles and microparticles. Her research interests include nature-derived nanopartocles, e.g., cellulose nanocrystals and nanofibers).

=== Honors and awards ===
Eugenia Kumacheva's awards and honors include:

- 1992: Minerva Foundation Fellowship (Germany)
- 1994: Imperial College London Visiting Fellowship (UK)
- 1999: Premier Research Excellence Award (Canada)
- 2000: International Chorafas Foundation Award
- 2002: Recipient of Canada Research Chair in Advanced Polymer Materials/Tier 2
- 2003: Schlumberger Scholarship University of Oxford
- 2004: Clara Benson Award (CIC Award)
- 2005: Macromolecular Science and Engineer Award, Chemical Institute of Canada
- 2006: Recipient of Canada Research Chair in Advanced Polymer Materials/ Tier 1
- 2007: Elected a Fellow of the Royal Society of Canada (FRSC)
- 2017: E. Gordon Young Lectureship, The Chemical Institute of Canada
- 2008: L'Oréal-UNESCO Women in Science Prize (Laureate for North America)
- 2009: Japan-Canada WISET lectureship, Royal Society of Canada
- 2010: Killam Research Fellowship, Canada Council for the Arts
- 2011: Distinguished Lecturer, The University of Western Ontario, Canada.
- 2011: Connaught Innovation Award, Connaught Foundation.
- 2012: Humboldt Research Award, Alexander von Humboldt Foundation (Germany).
- 2012: Inventor of the Year, University of Toronto
- 2013: University Professor (distinction given to <2% of faculty at the University of Toronto
- 2016: Elected a Fellow of the Royal Society (FRS) the British National Academy of Science
- 2017: Schmidt Lectureship, Weizmann Institute of Science, Israel
- 2017: Chemical Institute of Canada Medal
- 2019: 3M Lectureship
- 2019: De Gennes Prize, Royal Society of Chemistry, U.K
- 2020: Honorary Award for Lifetime Achievement in Nanoscience and Nanotechnology in Ontario
- 2020: Elected as an Officer of the Order of Canada
- 2021: Recipient of the Guggenheim Fellowship
- 2022: D.B. Robinson Distinguished Lectureship, University of Alberta, Canada
- 2023: Henry Marshall Tory Medal (Royal Society of Canada)
- 2023: ACS Award in Polymer Chemistry (USA)
