= Ying Zheng (engineer) =

Chinese-Canadian chemical engineer

Ying Zheng is a Chinese and Canadian chemical engineer whose research topics include water treatment, biofuel production, the manufacture of catalysts, and the recycling of materials from spent electric batteries. She is a professor in the Department of Chemical and Biochemical Engineering at the University of Western Ontario (Western University), where she holds a tier 1 Canada Research Chair in Chemical Reaction and Intensification.

== Education and career ==
Zheng is originally from China, the daughter of two engineers. After a 1999 Ph.D. from Western University, Zheng became an assistant professor of chemical engineering at the University of New Brunswick, where she was promoted to associate professor in 2004 and full professor in 2008. After a stint as a professor at the University of Edinburgh in Scotland from 2015 to 2018, she joined Western University as a full professor in 2018. After holding the Canada Research Chair in Chemical Processes and Catalysis since 2017, she was given a tier 1 Canada Research Chair in Chemical Reactions and Intensification in 2021.

== Recognition ==
Zheng was named as a Humboldt Fellow in 2007. She became a Fellow of the Chemical Institute of Canada in 2014, a Fellow of the Canadian Academy of Engineering in 2016, a Fellow of the Institution of Chemical Engineers in 2017, a Fellow of the Royal Society of Chemistry in 2018, and a Fellow of the Engineering Institute of Canada in 2022. She was elected to the Royal Society of Canada in 2025.

Zheng received the Syncrude Canada Innovation Award in 2010, the Design and Industrial Practice Award of the Canadian Society for Chemical Engineering in 2018, the Merit Award of The Federation of Chinese Canadian Professionals in 2022, and the Energy Systems Award of the American Institute of Aeronautics and Astronautics in 2025. In 2018 the Royal Society of Chemistry gave her their Applied Catalysis Award, "for the development and application of recyclable, heterogeneous nanocatalyst". She was the 2024 Canadian Catalysis Lecturer of the Canadian Catalysis Foundation.
