= Philip A. Gale =

Australian-British chemist

- Gale in July 2016
- Born: 1969 (age 56–57); Liverpool, Lancashire, UK
- Scientific career
- Awards: RSC Bob Hay Lectureship (2004); Corday-Morgan Prize (2005); Royal Society Wolfson Research Merit Award (2013); Supramolecular Chemistry Award (2014); Izatt-Christensen Award (2018); University of Sydney Vice-Chancellor’s Excellence Award for Outstanding Research (2020); Australian Academy of Science's David Craig Medal and Lecture (2026)
- Fields: Supramolecular chemistry
- Workplaces: University of Groningen; University of Technology Sydney; University of Sydney; University of Southampton; Wadham College University of Oxford; Linacre College University of Oxford; University of Texas at Austin

Philip Alan Gale (born 1969) is an Australian/British chemist, and Professor of Supramolecular Chemistry at the University of Groningen. He is notable for his work on the supramolecular chemistry of anions.

Gale was born in Liverpool and grew up in Woolton attending Gateacre Community Comprehensive School. He moved to Wadham College, Oxford, where he received his B.A. (Hons) degree in 1992 (M.A. Oxon. 1995) then moving in October 1992 to Linacre College where he graduated with a D.Phil. degree in 1995. He then moved to the University of Texas at Austin as a Fulbright Scholar with Prof. Jonathan Sessler. He returned to Oxford in 1997 as a Royal Society University Research Fellow and moved to a lectureship at the University of Southampton in 1999. He was promoted to a personal chair in supramolecular chemistry in 2007 and served as Head of Chemistry at the University of Southampton between 2010 and 2016. He was awarded a Doctor of Science degree by the University of Oxford in 2014. In January 2017 he moved to the University of Sydney where he took up the role of Head of the School of Chemistry and in 2020 Associate Dean (International) in the Faculty of Science. He became interim Dean of the Faculty of Science at the University of Sydney serving from April 2022 to January 2023. In February 2023 moved to the University of Technology Sydney to take up the role of Deputy Dean of Science serving in this role until November 2025. In January 2026 he started as Professor of Supramolecular Chemistry in the Zernikne Institute for Advanced Materials at the University of Groningen.

Gale's research interests are in supramolecular chemistry and in particular the molecular recognition and transmembrane transport of anions. His early work concerned the design of structurally simple anion receptors and elucidating other processes such as proton transfer that often accompany anion complexation. More recent research has focused on transmembrane anion transport. Gale has designed and synthesised a variety of highly effective classes of anion transporters including tren-based tris-ureas and -thioureas, squaramides and ortho-phenylene-based bis ureas. In 2013 Gale and co-workers published a quantitative structure activity relationship study showing that in a series of simple thioureas with one n-hexyl substituent and a phenyl substituent with different groups in the 4-position, the lipophilicity of the receptor is the dominant molecular parameter determining effective transport, with smaller contributions from the receptors’ volume and affinity for chloride.

Very recent work has focused on the design of new assays to measure anion transport and the development of selective transporters. Gale is notable for his work at the interface of supramolecular and medicinal chemistry showing the effect that anionophores developed in his research group have on biological systems. This includes restoring the flux of chloride through epithelial cell membranes (with potential future application as a channel replacement therapy in cystic fibrosis) and causing cell death in cancer cells by triggering apoptosis and interfering with autophagy.

Other aspects of Gale's work on transmembrane transport include the first synthetic chloride pumping system that uses fatty acids as fuels to create a chloride gradient across a lipid bilayer membrane, and the development of anion transporters that can be switched by membrane potential gradients or by the presence of reducing agents found in higher concentrations in tumours than in healthy tissue.

Gale is listed as a Thomson Reuters/Clarivate Analytics Highly Cited Research in Chemistry and has received a number of awards for his research including the RSC Bob Hay Lectureship in 2004, RSC Corday-Morgan Prize in 2005, a 2013 Royal Society Wolfson Research Merit Award, RSC Supramolecular Chemistry Award in 2014, the International Izatt-Christensen Award in Macrocyclic and Supramolecular Chemistry in 2018 and the 2026 David Craig Medal and Lecture from the Australian Academy of Science. In 2020 he was awarded a University of Sydney Vice-Chancellor’s Excellence Award for Outstanding Research and was highlighted by The Australian newspaper Research supplement (23 September 2020) as an Australian Field Research Leader (Chemistry & Material Sciences (general)) and in the 2024 issue as the field leader in inorganic chemistry. In 2024 he was elected to the ARC's College of Experts and in 2026 he was elected Fellow of the European Academy of Sciences.

Gale is the editor-in-chief of Coordination Chemistry Reviews.
