= Sigmund H. Danziger Jr. Memorial Lecture in the Humanities =

The Sigmund H. Danziger Jr. Memorial Lecture in the Humanities is an annual honorary bestowed upon an "established scholar of classical literature, who has made substantial contributions to the critical analysis of classical literature, or has been exceptionally skilled at inspiring an appreciation for classical literature" by the Humanities Division of the University of Chicago.

Sigmund H Danziger Jr. (1916–1979) founded Homak Mfg. Co. Inc. in 1947 in Chicago. A Chicago southsider and son of a sales representative for houseware products, including bathroom scales, Danziger began his business career "jobbing" for Chicago manufacturers while a student at the University of Chicago (graduated 1937). After the World War II, in which he served as a captain and translator, he purchased a bathroom cabinet manufacturer on the south side of Chicago for which he was jobbing. Naming the new company Homak, capturing a sign he noted on a hat store, he began manufacturing steel kitchen cabinets and rapidly moved to a 35,000 sq ft (3,300 m^{2}) building, which he designed at 4433 S. Springfield Ave in Chicago. In the early 1960s, an order for tool boxes lead to the production of a hardware line including roller cabinets, tool boxes, and other accessories. Through the 1970s and 1980s, most of the major retailers and chains of the time became either line or private label customers at one time or another, including Sears, Walmart, Kmart, Lowe's, The Home Depot True Value, Ace Hardware, Montgomery Ward, Coast-to-Coast, Costco, Meijer, Pep Boys, Fingerhut, NAPA, Restoration Hardware, etc. In 1979, Sigmund Danziger died and his wife Gertrude (Trudy)(1919-2021), who was known as "The Toolbox Lady" in the hardware industry, ran the company for the next 25 years. During this time, the company moved to a 400,000 sq ft (37,000 m^{2}) facility in Bedford Park, Illinois at 5151 W 73rd St. while sales grew to over $100,000,000 with hardware, automotive, hospital (under Homed TM), and sporting goods lines. One of the major innovations during this period was the introduction of a consumer gun cabinet (under HomSafe TM), which instantly grew to be a major hit at mass retailers, including Bass Pro Shops, Gander Mountain, Dick's Sporting Goods and Sports Authority. Also a line of garage cabinets was introduced for Whirlpool and Sears under the label "Gladiator Garageworks." Homak employed hundreds of people, who enjoyed the prosperity of the industry, and was the largest privately held sheet-metal fabricator in America.

== List of Sigmund H. Danziger Jr. lecturers ==
- 2026-2027 James Q Whitman
- 2025-2026. Joseph Manning
- 2024-2025. Emily Wilson (classicist)
- 2023-2024. Barbara Graziosi
- 2022-2023. David Wengrow
- 2020-2021. Judith Butler
- 2019-2020 William Johnson
- 2018-2019. Fiona Macintosh
- 2017-2018 Marina Warner
- 2016-2017. Simon Schama
- 2015–2016 Daniel Boyarin
- 2014–2015 Stephen Greenblatt
- 2013–2014 John T. Hamilton
- 2012–2013 Julia Annas
- 2011–2012. C. Brian Rose
- 2010–2011 Anthony Grafton
- 2009–2010 Page DuBois
- 2008–2009 Elaine Pagels
- 2007–2008 Mary Beard
- 2006–2007 Daniel Mendelsohn
- 2005–2006 Jacques Rancière
- 2004–2005 Andrew Ford
- 2003–2004 Steven Feld
- 2002–2003 Josiah Ober
- 2001–2002 Ian Hacking
- 2000–2001 Simon Goldhill
- 1999–2000 David Shulman
- 1998–1999 Joan E. DeJean
- 1997–1998 Mary Poovey
- 1996–1997 Peter Brown
- 1995–1996 Irene J. Winter
- 1994–1995 Charles Segal
- 1993–1994 Friedrich Kittler
- 1992–1993 Gary A. Tomlinson
- 1991–1992 Hazel Carby
- 1990–1991 Naomi Schor
- 1989–1990 Natalie Zemon Davis
- 1988–1989 Kenneth Dover

== See also ==
- Martin Classical Lectures: Oberlin College
- Stieglitz Lecture: University of Chicago
