= Tuan Vo-Dinh =

- Born: April 11, 1948 (age 78); Nha Trang, South Vietnam
- Citizenship: United States of America
- Education: ETH Zurich
- Known for: Photonics research
- Scientific career
- Fields: Chemistry, Biomedical Engineering, Photonics
- Workplaces: Duke University

Tuan Vo-Dinh (Vietnamese: Võ Đình Tuấn) (Nha Trang, 11 April 1948) is R. Eugene and Susie E. Goodson Professor of Biomedical Engineering at the Duke University Pratt School of Engineering and professor of Chemistry and director of the Fitzpatrick Institute for Photonics at Duke.

== Early years and education ==
Born in Nha Trang, Vietnam, he earned his doctorate in biophysical chemistry at the Swiss Federal Institute of Technology in Zurich in 1975 and emigrated to the United States in 1975.

He researched at Oak Ridge National Laboratory in Tennessee as director of Center for Advanced Biomedical Photonics, and was professor at the University of California and the University of Tennessee, (Knoxville), before coming to Duke in March 2006.

== Research ==
He specializes in photonics, the physical science of light.

His research activities and interests include biophotonics, nanophotonics, plasmonics, laser-excited luminescence spectroscopy, room-temperature phosphorimetry, synchronous luminescence spectroscopy, surface-enhanced Raman spectroscopy, field environmental instrumentation, fiber optics sensors, nanosensors, biosensors and biochips for the protection of the environment and the improvement of human health.

He pioneered the development of a new generation of gene probes using surface-enhanced Raman scattering (SERS) detection with ‘Molecular Sentinels’ and Plasmonic Coupling Interference (PCI) molecular probes for multiplex and label-free detection of nucleic acid biomarkers (DNA, mRNA, microRNA) in early detection of cancer.

His research group is developing a photothermal immunotherapy technology that uses lasers and gold nanostars to heat up and destroy tumors, in combination with an immunotherapeutic drug.

== Recognition ==
He was ranked No. 43 on a list of the world's top 100 living geniuses in a survey conducted by Creators Synectics, a global consultants firm.

He was elected to the National Academy of Inventors in 2017.

In May 2019, he received the Sir George Stokes Award from the Royal Society of Chemistry in recognition of "outstanding and sustained contributions to analytical science through innovations in the field of photonics, spectroscopy, molecular biology and nanotechnology."

== Patents ==
- T. Vo-Dinh, "Dosimeter for Monitoring Vapors and Aerosols of Organic Compounds," U.S. Patent No. 4,680,165 (1987).
- T. Vo-Dinh, "Practical Substrate and Apparatus for Static and Continuous Monitoring by Surface-Enhanced Raman Spectroscopy," U.S. Patent No. 4,674,878 (1987).
- T. Vo-Dinh, "Surface-Enhanced Raman Optical Data Storage," U.S. Patent No. 4,999,810 (1991).
- M. J. Sepaniak and T. Vo-Dinh, "Fiber Optic-Based Regenerable Biosensor," U.S. Patent No. 5,176,881 (1993).
- T. Vo-Dinh, "Enhanced Photo Activated Luminescence for Screening Polychlorobiphenyls (PCBs) and Other Related Compounds," U.S. Patent 5,272,089 (1993).
- T. Vo-Dinh, "Raman-Based System for DNA Sequencing, Mapping and Other Separations," U.S. Patent 5,306,403 (1994).
- T. Vo-Dinh, "Improved Surface-Enhanced Raman Optical Data Storage System," U.S. Patent 5,325,342 (1994).
- T. Vo-Dinh, "Apparatus and Methods for Detecting Chemical Permeation," US Patent 5,376,554 (1994).
- T. Vo-Dinh, EPAL Apparatus for Screening Polychlorinated Biphenyls (PCBs), and Other Chlorinated Compounds," US Patent 5,318,751 (1994).
- T. Vo-Dinh, "Surface-Enhanced Raman Scattering (SERS) Dosimeter and Probe," U.S. Patent 5,400,136 (1995).
- T. Vo-Dinh, "Article of Protective Clothing Adapted for Detecting Chemical Permeation and Methods Therapy," US Patent 5,493,730 (1996).
- T. Vo-Dinh, "Photo-activated Luminescence Sensor and Method for Detecting Trichloroethoplene and Related Volatile Organochloride Compounds," US Patent 5,525,520 (1996).
- T. Vo-Dinh and P. Viallet, "Biosensor and Chemical Sensors Probes for Calcium and Other Metal Ions," US Patent 5,496,522 (1996).
- T. Vo-Dinh, M. Panjehpour and B.F. Overholt, "Laser-Induced Differential Normalized Fluorescence Method for Cancer Diagnosis," US Patent 5,579,773 (1996).
- T. Vo-Dinh, "Advanced Synchronous Luminescence System for Medical Diagnostics," US Patent 5,599,717 (1997).
- T. Vo-Dinh, "Raman and Surface-Enhanced Raman Gene Probe and Detection System," US Patent 5,721,102 (1998).
- T. Vo-Dinh, "Advanced Surface-Enhanced Raman Gene Probes and Method Thereof," US Patent 5,783,389 (1998)
- T. Vo-Dinh, "Advanced Surface-Enhanced Raman Gene Probes and Method Thereof," US Patent 5,814,516 (1998).
- T. Vo-Dinh, "Surface-Enhanced Raman Medical Probes and System for Disease Diagnostics and Drug Testing," US Patent 5,864,397 (1999).
- T. Vo-Dinh, "Advanced Synchronous Luminescence System for the Detection of Biological Agents and Infectious Pathogens," US Patent 5,938,617 (1999).
- T. Vo-Dinh, "Advanced Surface-enhanced Raman Gene Probe Systems and Methods thereof," US Patent 6,174,677 (2001).
- T. Vo-Dinh, N. Erickson, and A.L. Wintenberg, "Integrated Circuit Biochip Microsystem Containing Lens," US Patent 6,197,503 (2001).
- T. Vo-Dinh and S. Norton, "Method and apparatus of spectro-acoustically enhanced ultrasonic detection for diagnostics," US Patent 6,212,421 (2001).
- T. Vo-Dinh, "Nanoprobe for surface-enhanced Raman spectroscopy in medical diagnostic and drug screening," US Patent 6,219,137 (2001).
- T. Vo-Dinh and A. Sadana, "Fractal Analysis of Time Varying Data," US Patent 6,422,998 (2002).
- T. Vo-Dinh, N. Erickson, and A.L. Wintenberg, "Integrated Circuit Biochip Microsystem" US Patent 6,448,064 B1 (2002)
- T. Vo-Dinh "SERODS Optical Data Storage with Parallel Signal Transfer", US Patent 6,583,397 (2003).
- T. Vo-Dinh "SERODS Optical Data Storage with Parallel Signal Transfer", US Patent 6,614,730 (2003).
- T. Vo-Dinh "Multifunctional and Multispectral Biosensor and Methods of Use", US Patent 6,743,581 (2004).
- T. Vo-Dinh and M .Hajaligol "Monitoring of Vapor Phase Polycyclic Aromatic Hydrocarbons", US Patent 6,744,503 (2004).
- T. Vo-Dinh and A.L. Wintenberg "Integrated Tunable Optical System" (US Patent 6,965,431 (2004).
- T. Vo-Dinh, "Advanced Synchronous Luminescence Imaging for Chemical and Medical Diagnostics", US Patent 7,103,402 (2006).

== Books ==
- Vo-Dinh T., Room Temperature Phosphorimetry for Chemical Analysis, Wiley Interscience, New York (1984).
- Vo-Dinh T., Editor, Chemical Analysis of Polycyclic Aromatic Compounds, Wiley, New York (1989).
- Vo-Dinh T. and Eastwood D.L., Editors, Laser-Based Approaches in Luminescence Spectroscopy, ASTM Publishers, Philadelphia (1990).
- Vo-Dinh T., Editor-in-chief, Biomedical Photonics Handbook, CRC Press, Boca Raton, FL (2003).
- Gauglitz G. and Vo-Dinh T., Editors, Handbook of Spectroscopy, Wiley-VCH, New York (2003).
- Vo-Dinh T., Editor, Protein Nanotechnology, Humana Press, New York, (in press).
