= Bill David =

British chemist

Bill David FRS
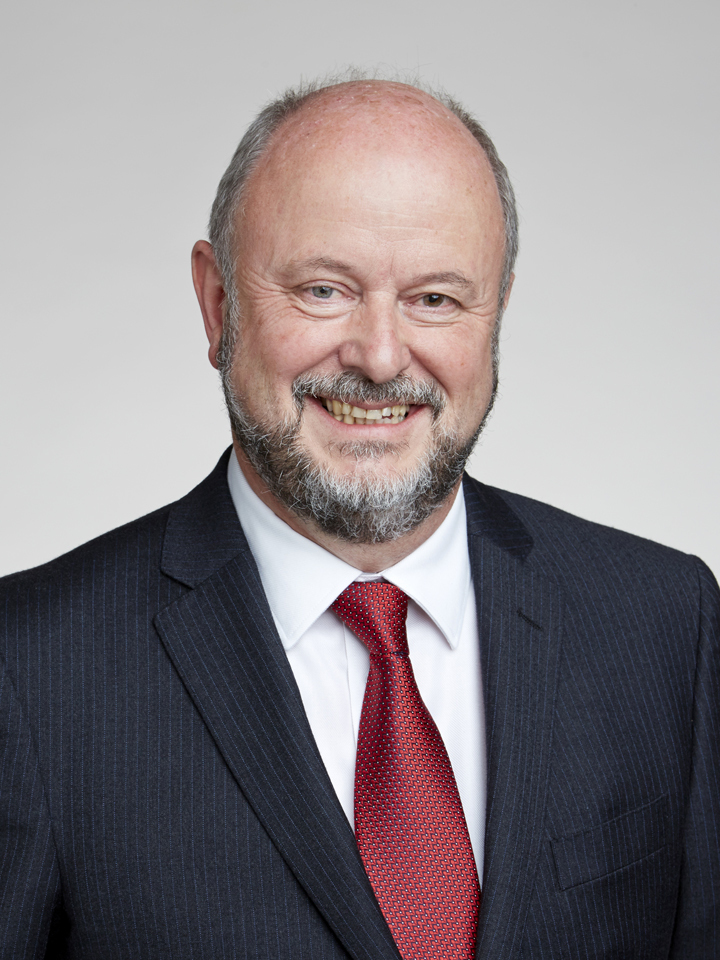
- David in 2016
- Education: University of Oxford
- Awards: John B Goodenough Award
- Scientific career
- Workplaces: University of Oxford; Rutherford Appleton Laboratory
- Thesis: Structural phase transitions in ferroic ABO^{4} crystals (1981)

William I. F. David FRS is a British professor of Materials Chemistry in the Department of Chemistry at the University of Oxford, an STFC Senior Fellow at the ISIS neutron source at the Rutherford Appleton Laboratory and a Fellow of St Catherine's College, Oxford.

== Education ==
David was educated at St Catherine's College, Oxford, where he read Physics as an undergraduate student. He completed his postgraduate work in the Clarendon Laboratory and was awarded his DPhil degree from the University of Oxford in 1981 for research supervised by Anthony Michael Glazer. Following his PhD, he was a postdoctoral researcher supervised by John B. Goodenough in Oxford.

== Research ==
David has made significant contributions to the development of neutron diffraction and X-ray powder diffraction. Highlights include the comprehensive crystal-structure analysis of C_{60} (Buckminsterfullerene), and the accelerated determination of molecular crystal structures through his computer program, DASH. His theoretical work is based on the application of Bayesian probability theory in areas ranging from structural incompleteness to parametric data analysis.

David's materials focus is in energy storage, beginning with his research on lithium battery cathodes. More recently, he has worked on lightweight hydrogen storage materials such as reversible imide-amide systems. Following his discovery of a new family of ammonia-decomposition catalysts, his main energy research interests are in materials that facilitate the safe and effective utilisation of ammonia as an energy vector.

== Awards and honours ==
Bill's awards include the Institute of Physics C. V. Boys Prize (1990), the inaugural British Crystallographic Association Prize (2002), the European Society for Applied Physical Chemistry Prize (2006), one of three William Lawrence Bragg Lecture Awards (2013) marking the centenary of the discovery of X-ray diffraction, and the John B Goodenough Award from the Royal Society of Chemistry (RSC) in 2015 recognising exceptional and sustained contributions to materials chemistry. He was elected a Fellow of the Royal Society (FRS) in 2016.
