= Matthew Rosseinsky =

British academic and professor

Matthew Rosseinsky OBE FRS
- Education: University of Oxford
- Awards: De Gennes Prize (2009); Hughes Medal (2011); Davy Medal (2017); Royal Medal (2025)
- Scientific career
- Workplaces: Bell Labs; University of Oxford; University of Liverpool
- Thesis: Physical Properties of Superconducting Oxides and Radical Cation Salts (1990)
- Doctoral advisor: Peter Day

Matthew Jonathan Rosseinsky is a British academic who is Professor of Inorganic Chemistry at the University of Liverpool. He was awarded the Hughes Medal in 2011 "for his influential discoveries in the synthetic chemistry of solid state electronic materials and novel microporous structures."

He has been awarded the Harrison Memorial Prize (1991), Corday-Morgan Medal and Prize (2000) and Tilden Lectureship (2006) of the Royal Society of Chemistry (RSC). In 2009, he was awarded the inaugural De Gennes Prize by the RSC, a lifetime achievement award in materials chemistry, open internationally. In 2013, he became a Royal Society Research Professor.

In 2017, he was awarded the Davy Medal of the Royal Society for “his advances in the design and discovery of functional materials, integrating the development of new experimental and computational techniques.” He gave the Muetterties Lectures at UC Berkeley and the Lee Lectures at the University of Chicago in 2017. In 2019, he gave the Flack Memorial Lectures of the Swiss Crystallographic Society and was awarded the Frankland Lectureship by Imperial College London. In 2020, he was made an Honorary Fellow of the Chemical Research Society of India. In 2022, he gave the Davison Lectures at the Massachusetts Institute of Technology, and received the Basolo Award of the Chicago Section of the American Chemical Society.

He was a member of the Science Minister's Advanced Materials Leadership Council from 2014–2016, and of the governing Council of the Engineering and Physical Sciences Research Council from 2015–2019.

In 2023, he received the Eni Energy Frontiers Award for the digital design and discovery of next-generation energy materials from the President of Italy. In 2025 he was awarded the Royal Medal of the Royal Society.
