= Geoffrey Barker Medal =

The Geoffrey Barker Medal, first awarded in 1988, is given by the Royal Society of Chemistry to scientists working in the UK or Ireland in recognition of their contributions to electrochemistry. The winner is invited to give a plenary lecture at that year's Electrochem meeting.

== Laureates ==
Source: RSC

Year	Winner
2024	Ifan E. L. Stephens
2022	Robert A. W. Dryfe
2020	Julie V. MacPherson
2018	Frank Marken, University of Bath
2016	Richard J. Nichols
2014	Peter Bruce
2012	Fraser Andrew Armstrong
2010	Patrick Unwin
2007	Alexei Kornyshev
2003	Philip N. Bartlett
2001	David Edward Williams
2000	David J. Schiffrin
1997	Alan Maxwell Bond
1994	Richard G. Compton
1991	Laurie M. Peter
1988	John Albery

== See also ==
- List of chemistry awards
