= Anne Pippin Burnett =

American classical scholar and academic

- Born: Anne Pippin Burnett; October 10, 1925; Salt Lake City, Utah, United States
- Died: April 22, 2017 (aged 91); Kingston, Ontario, Canada
- Occupations: Academic, scholar
- Awards: Guggenheim Fellowship (1981)

Academic background
- Education: University of California, Berkeley
- Thesis: (1953)

Academic work
- Discipline: Classics
- Sub-discipline: Greek literature
- Institutions: Vassar College; University of Chicago

Anne Pippin Burnett (October 10, 1925 – April 22, 2017) was an American classical scholar and academic who specialised in Greek literature, especially tragedy and the lyric poetry of the archaic and early classical periods.

== Career ==
She earned her BA from Swarthmore College in 1946 and followed this with an MA in 1947 at Columbia University. In 1953 she gained her PhD from Berkeley. She subsequently taught at Vassar College (1957–58) and was an editor and translator for the publishing house Hachette. She joined the University of Chicago, in 1961 as an assistant professor, becoming a professor in 1970. She was chair of the Department of Classical Languages and Literature from 1969 to 1973 and retired as Professor Emerita in 1992.

Burnett's research and writing focused on Greek revenge tragedies, which she argued should be seen in the context of their times and not through the lens of contemporary social and moral views, and on poets including Pindar, Archilochus, Alcaeus, and Sappho.

She received many academic awards during her career including a Martin Lecture at Oberlin College in 1978, George B. Walsh Lecture at the University of Chicago (1989–90), Sather Professor of Classical Literature at Berkeley (1993–94), and a Guggenheim fellowship in 1981.

== Death ==
Anne Pippin Burnett died on April 22, 2017, in Kingston, Ontario, Canada, at the age of 91. She was predeceased by her husband Virgil Burnett, an American-born naturalized Canadian citizen. He was an artist and writer, whom she had married on 16 February 1961. She was survived by their two daughters, Maud Burnett McInerney and Melissa Gromoff, and three grandchildren.

== Selected publications ==
- Euripides: Ion, a Translation with Commentary. Upper Saddle River: Prentice Hall 1970
- Catastrophe Survived: Euripides' Plays of Mixed Reversal. Oxford 1971
- Three Archaic Poets: Archilochus, Alcaeus, Sappho. London 1983. Paperback, Bristol 1998
- The Art of Bacchylides. Cambridge 1985 (Martin Classical Lectures 29)
- Revenge in Attic and Later Tragedy. Berkeley/Los Angeles 1998 (Sather Classical Lectures). ISBN 0-520-21096-4
- Pindar's Songs for Young Athletes of Aigina. Oxford 2005. ISBN 978-0-19-927794-0
- Pindar. Ancients in Action. London 2008
- Pindar: Odes for Victorious Athletes. Baltimore 2010. ISBN 978-0-8018-9574-6
