= Supramolecular Chemistry Award =

Chemistry award

RSC/MASC Supramolecular Chemistry Award
- Awarded for: The Supramolecular Chemistry Award recognises studies leading to the design of functionally useful supramolecular species.
- Sponsored by: Royal Society of Chemistry/Macrocyclic and Supramolecular Chemistry Interest Group.
- Date: 2001
- Website: mascgroup.co.uk/masc-prizes-and-awards/

The RSC Supramolecular Chemistry Award was a prestigious award that was made by the Royal Society of Chemistry for studies leading to the design of functionally useful supramolecular species. The first award was made in 2001 and the final award in 2020 following a review of the RSC Awards structure. It was awarded biennially.

In 2022 the award was revived by the RSC Macrocyclic and Supramolecular Chemistry interest group as the MASC Supramolecular Chemistry Award sponsored by Chem from Cell Press and is awarded annually.

== Recipients ==
- 2001: David Parker
- 2003: David A. Leigh
- 2005: Harry L. Anderson
- 2010: Neil Champness
- 2012: Jerry L. Atwood
- 2014: Philip A. Gale
- 2016: Michael D. Ward
- 2018: Sijbren Otto
- 2020: Christopher A. Hunter
- 2022: Jonathan L. Sessler
- 2023: Kate Jolliffe
- 2024: Jonathan Nitschke
- 2025: Job Boekhoven

== See also ==
- List of chemistry awards
