= Lebedev Prize =

The S.V. Lebedev Prize is an award, presented from 1943 to 1995 by the Academy of Sciences of the USSR and since 1995 by Russian Academy of Sciences, for outstanding work in the field of chemistry and technology of synthetic rubber and other synthetic polymers.

== Recipients ==
Source: Russian Academy of Science (in Russian)

Year	Laureate	Name of the work
2019	Yakimansky, Alexander Vadimovich and Filippov, Alexander Pavlovich	"Regularly grafted polyimides as promising materials for membrane and medical sciences"
2016	Gritskova Inessa Aleksandrovna, Sergey A. Gusev and Shragin Denis I.	"New approaches to the synthesis of monodisperse functional polymer microspheres and their biomedical applications"
2013	Vygodskii Yakov S., Shaplov Alexander S. and Lozinskaya Elena I.	Series of works "Ionic Liquids in the synthesis and modification of polymers, promising areas of utilization"
2011	Vsevolod Pavlovsky, Sergey Denisyuk, and Sergey Dubovsky ,	Series of scientific works "Electric power system Stability and control issues under liberalization of the electricity markets"
2010	Ponomarenko Sergey A.	Series of works "New functional oligomeric and polymeric materials based on thiophene for organic electronics and photonics"
2007	Novakov Ivan A. and Orlinson Boris S.	Series of works on research in the field of adamantane containing polymers
2004	Zaboristov V.N. and Ryahovskii V.S.	For the work "Development of new technologies and the creation of a novel highly stereoselective catalysts based on rare earth elements compounds and the organization of the first Russian ecologically benign industrial production of polymers and copolymers of conjugated dienes"
2001	Oreshkin I.A., Makovetsky K.L. and Finkelshtein E. Sh.	Series of works "Metathesis and additive polymerization additive of cycloolefins"
1995	Kulichihin V. G., Tal'rose Raisa V. and Plate Nikolai A.	Series of works "New mesophase polymers and compositions on their basis"

== See also ==
- List of chemistry awards
