= Tobin J. Marks =

American chemist (born 1944)

- Born: Tobin Jay Marks; November 25, 1944 (age 81); United States
- Education: University of Maryland; Massachusetts Institute of Technology
- Known for: Organometallic chemistry, inorganic chemistry
- Awards: National Medal of Science (2005); NAS Award in Chemical Sciences (2012); Dreyfus Prize in the Chemical Sciences; Priestley Medal
- Scientific career
- Fields: Chemistry, Material Science
- Workplaces: Northwestern University
- Doctoral advisor: F. Albert Cotton

Tobin Jay Marks (born November 25, 1944) is an inorganic chemistry Professor, the Vladimir N. Ipatieff Professor of Catalytic Chemistry, Professor of Material Science and Engineering, Professor of Chemical and Biological Engineering, and Professor of Applied Physics at Northwestern University in Evanston, Illinois. Among the themes of his research are synthetic organo-f-element and early-transition metal organometallic chemistry, polymer chemistry, materials chemistry, homogeneous and heterogeneous catalysis, molecule-based photonic materials, superconductivity, metal-organic chemical vapor deposition, and biological aspects of transition metal chemistry.

Marks received his B.S. from the University of Maryland in 1966 in chemistry, and his Ph.D. from the Massachusetts Institute of Technology in 1971 under the direction of F. A. Cotton. He came to Northwestern University in the fall of 1970.

== The Marks Group ==
Historically the Marks group has been organized into four teams (A-D), reflecting the historical strengths and the needs of emerging technologies:

- A-team; Organometallics/Catalysis
- B-team: Molecular Photonics
- C-team: Transparent Oxides
- D-team: Molecular Electronics

Marks is known for his ability to tie his efforts to practical problems. Work in organometallics/catalysis (A-team) has traditionally focused on two main areas: Group IV mediated polymerizations and f-element mediated hydroelementation. His extensive work in polymerization catalysts and determination of mechanistic traits that allow for optimization, have made these materials and processes industrially relevant.

== Awards ==
- 1974: Alfred P. Sloan Fellow (see Sloan Fellows)
- 1975: Camille and Henry Dreyfus Teacher Scholar
- 1977: DuPont Young Faculty Fellow
- 1978: Innovation Recognition Award, Union Carbide Corporation
- 1979: Fresenius Pure and Applied Chemistry Award of Phi Lambda Upsilon
- 1984: Sobral Medal, Portuguese Chemical Society
- 1984: American Chemical Society (ACS) Arthur K. Doolittle Award in Polymeric Materials Science and Engineering
- 1986: Mack Awardee and Lecturer, Ohio State University
- 1989–1990: Guggenheim Fellowship
- 1989: American Chemical Society Award in Organometallic Chemistry
- 1993: Fellow, American Academy of Arts and Sciences
- 1993: Member, US National Academy of Sciences
- 1994: American Chemical Society (ACS) Award in Inorganic Chemistry
- 1997: Centenary Medal, UK Royal Society of Chemistry
- 1998: Francis Clifford Phillips Award, University of Pittsburgh
- 1999: Paolo Chini Award, Italian Chemical Society
- 2000: F.A. Cotton Medal for Excellence in Chemical Research of the American Chemical Society
- 2001: Burwell Award, North American Catalysis Society
- 2001: American Chemical Society (ACS) Award in the Chemistry of Materials
- 2001: Linus Pauling Medal
- 2001: Willard Gibbs Medal, ACS Chicago Section
- 2002: American Institute of Chemists Gold Medal
- 2003: Evans Medal, Ohio State University
- 2003: Karl Ziegler Prize, Gesellschaft Deutscher Chemiker
- 2004: Sir Edward Frankland Medal, UK Royal Society of Chemistry
- 2005: Fellow, UK Royal Society of Chemistry
- 2005: John Bailar Medal, University of Illinois and the American Chemical Society
- 2005: Member, Leopoldina, German National Academy of Natural Sciences
- 2005: United States National Medal of Science
- 2005: University of Maryland Alumni Hall of Fame
- 2008: Honorary Fellow, Chemical Research Society of India
- 2008: American Chemical Society Award for Distinguished Service in the Advancement of Inorganic Chemistry
- 2008: Príncipe de Asturias Prize for Technical and Scientific Research (Spain)
- 2009: Fellow, Materials Research Society
- 2009: Herman Pines Award, North American Catalysis Society
- 2009: Nelson W. Taylor Award in Materials Research, Penn State University
- 2009: Von Hippel Award, Materials Research Society
- 2010: Centennial Medal, University of Oviedo (Spain)
- 2010: Distinguished Affiliated Professor Award, Technical University of Munich
- 2010: Wilhelm Manchot Prize, Technical University of Munich
- 2010: William H. Nichols Medal, ACS New York Section
- 2011: Dreyfus Prize in the Chemical Sciences, The Camille and Henry Dreyfus Foundation
- 2011: Honorary Fellow, Indian National Academy of Sciences
- 2011: Mosher Award, ACS Santa Clara / Silicon Valley, California Section
- 2011: Schulich Prize, Technion in Israel
- 2011: American Chemical Society Arthur Cope Senior Scholar Award in Organic Chemistry
- 2012: Distinguished Alumni Award and Election to Circle of Discovery, University of Maryland
- 2012: Gabor A. Somorjai Award for Creative Research in Catalysis
- 2012: Member, US National Academy of Engineering
- 2012: Theodore W. Richards Medal, American Chemical Society
- 2012: US National Academy of Sciences Award in Chemical Sciences
- 2013: Alan G. MacDiarmid Medal, University of Pennsylvania
- 2013: Honorary Member, The Israel Chemical Society
- 2014: Sir Geoffrey Wilkinson Medal, UK Royal Society of Chemistry
- 2015: Honorary Foreign Fellow, Chinese Chemical Society
- 2015: Luigi Sacconi Medal, Italian Chemical Society
- 2015: The Royal Society of Chemistry's Materials for Industry - Derek Birchall Award
- 2016: Honorary doctor of the Department of Chemistry, Technical University of Munich
- 2016: Member, US National Academy of Inventors
- 2016: Tannas Award in Materials Science, University of California Los Angeles
- 2016: Chinese Academy of Sciences President’s International Award for Distinguished Scientists
- 2017: ACS Priestley Medal
- 2017: Harvey Prize in Science & Technology from the Technion in Israel
- 2018: Foreign Member, Accademia Nazionale dei Lincei Italian National Academy of Sciences
