= Richard G. Compton =

British Chemistry Professor (born 1955)

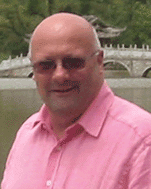
- Born: 10 March 1955 (age 71); Scunthorpe, England
- Education: University College, Oxford
- Scientific career
- Fields: Chemistry
- Doctoral advisor: W. J. Albery

Richard Guy Compton FRSC MAE (born 10 March 1955 in Scunthorpe, UK) is a Professor of Chemistry and Aldrichian Praelector at Oxford University, United Kingdom. He is a Tutorial Fellow of St John’s College, Oxford and has a large research group based at the Physical and Theoretical Chemistry Laboratory at Oxford University. Compton has broad interests in both fundamental and applied electrochemistry and electro-analysis including nano-chemical aspects. He has published more than 1600 papers (h-index = 102) with more than 44,000 citations, excluding self-cites, as of March 2020; Thompson Reuters Highly Cited Researcher 2014, 2015 and 2016) and 7 books (see list below).

Patents have been filed on 25 different topics including novel pH sensors, gas sensing and the detection of garlic strength and chilli heat in foodstuffs. The Senova pHit Scanner based on Compton group patents - the world’s first calibration-free pH meter - won the 'best new product' award at PITTCON March 2013.

Richard Compton has been CAS Visiting Professor at the Institute of Physical Sciences, Hefei and is a Lifelong Honorary Professor at Sichuan University. He holds Honorary Doctorates from the Estonian Agricultural University and Kharkov National University of Radio-electronics (Ukraine) and is a Fellow of the Royal Society of Chemistry, of IUPAC and of the International Society of Electrochemistry. He received the Royal Society of Chemistry's Sir George Stokes Award in 2011, and their Robert Boyle Prize for Analytical Science in 2018.

He is a Member of the Academia Europaea and Founding Editor and Editor-in-Chief of the journal Electrochemistry Communications, published by Elsevier.

== Published Books ==
“Electrode Potentials”, Oxford University Press, 1996, reprinted 1998 and 2002, with G H W Sanders.

“Foundations of Physical Chemistry”, Oxford University Press, 1996 reprinted 1999 and 2005 with A Rodger and C Lawrence. Japanese translation published in 1997, Spanish translation in 2001.

“Foundations of Physical Chemistry: Worked Examples”, Oxford University Press, 1999, with N S Lawrence and J D Wadhawan.

“Understanding Voltammetry”, World Scientific, 1st Edition, 2007, co-authored with C E Banks. 2nd Edition, published January 2011. Russian translation published 2015.

“A G Stromberg: First Class Scientist, Second Class Citizen. Letters from the GULAG and a History of Electroanalysis in the USSR” with A S Kabakaev, M J Stawpert, G G Wildgoose and E A Zakharova, Imperial College Press, published March 2011.

“Understanding Voltammetry: Problems and Solutions”, with C Batchelor-McAuley and E J F Dickinson, Imperial College Press, published February 2012.

“Understanding Voltammetry: Simulation of Electrode Processes”, with E Laborda and K R Ward, Imperial College Press, published January 2014.
