= De Gennes Prize =

Award granted by the Royal Society of Chemistry

- Awarded for: Outstanding and exceptional work in the field of materials chemistry.
- Sponsored by: Royal Society of Chemistry
- Date: 2008
- Reward: £3000
- Website: www.rsc.org/ScienceAndTechnology/Awards/deGennesPrize/

The De Gennes Prize (formerly known as the Prize for Materials Chemistry) was established in 2008 and is awarded biennially by the Royal Society of Chemistry for outstanding and exceptional work in the field of materials chemistry. The de Gennes Prize honours the work of Pierre-Gilles de Gennes.

The recipient of the de Gennes Prize receives £5000, a medal and certificate and completes a UK lecture tour.

Pierre-Gilles de Gennes was born in Paris, France, in 1932. After graduating in 1955 from Ecole Normale, de Gennes was a research engineer at the Atomic Energy Centre (Saclay). After a brief time at University of California, Berkeley and 27 months in the French Navy, de Gennes became assistant professor at the University of Paris in Orsay. During his time at Orsay de Gennes worked on superconductors and liquid crystals.

In 1991, Pierre-Gilles de Gennes was awarded the Nobel Prize for Physics for studying the boundary lines between order and disorder in materials like liquid crystals.

After receiving the Nobel Prize, de Gennes visited roughly 200 high schools over a two-year period, from 1992 to 1994, in which he delivered talks on science, innovation and common sense to the students. Pierre-Gilles de Gennes died at the age of 74, on 18 May 2007.

== Winners ==
Source: Royal Society of Chemistry

- 2009: Matthew Rosseinsky, University of Liverpool.
- 2011: Steve Mann, University of Bristol.
- 2013: Susumu Kitagawa, Kyoto University.
- 2015: Mercouri Kanatzidis, Northwestern University
- 2017: Ian Manners, University of Bristol
- 2019: Eugenia Kumacheva, University of Toronto
- 2021: Chad Mirkin, Northwestern University
- 2023: Thuc-Quyen Nguyen, University of California Santa Barbara.
- 2025: Samson Jenekhe, University of Washington

== See also ==
- List of chemistry awards
