= John B. Goodenough Award =

Award given by the Royal Society of Chemistry

- Awarded for: Contributions to materials chemistry
- Sponsored by: Royal Society of Chemistry
- Date: 2008
- Country: United Kingdom (international)
- Formerly called: Materials Chemistry Forum Lifetime Award

The John B. Goodenough Award is run biennially by the Royal Society of Chemistry and awards contributions to the field of materials chemistry. The prize winner, chosen by the Materials Chemistry Division Awards Committee, receives a monetary reward, a medal, a certificate and completes a UK lecture tour.

== Award history ==
The award, which was originally referred to as the Materials Chemistry Forum Lifetime Award, was set up in 2008. It was named after the materials scientist John Bannister Goodenough, who has made significant contributions to the development of the first random access memory and in the field of Li-ion rechargeable batteries.

== Previous winners ==
Year	Scientist(s)	Institution	Research	Ref
2009	David C. Sherrington	University of Strathclyde	"use of polymers in materials chemistry"	
2011	Andrew Holmes	University of Melbourne	polymeric materials for optoelectronics and light harvesting	
2013	Anthony West	University of Sheffield	"structure-composition-property relationships in oxide-based materials"	
2015	William I. F. David	University of Oxford	"development of new theoretical and experimental approaches to powder diffraction and his contributions to the understanding of structure-property relationships in important solid-state materials"	
2017	Stephen Elliott	University of Cambridge	"science of disordered materials when applied to chalcogenide glasses and phase-change materials for industry"	
2019	Clare Grey	University of Cambridge	"uses of magnetic resonance methods to study structure and dynamics in electrochemical devices"	
2022	J. Paul Attfield	University of Edinburgh	"new materials from high pressure synthesis and of novel electronic phenomena in solids"	
2024	Dermot O'Hare	University of Oxford	"new concepts in materials chemistry, catalysis, and nanomaterials and promoting their application and commercialisation in sustainable technologies"	

== See also ==
- List of chemistry awards
