= Christoph H. Borchers =

Canadian medical researcher

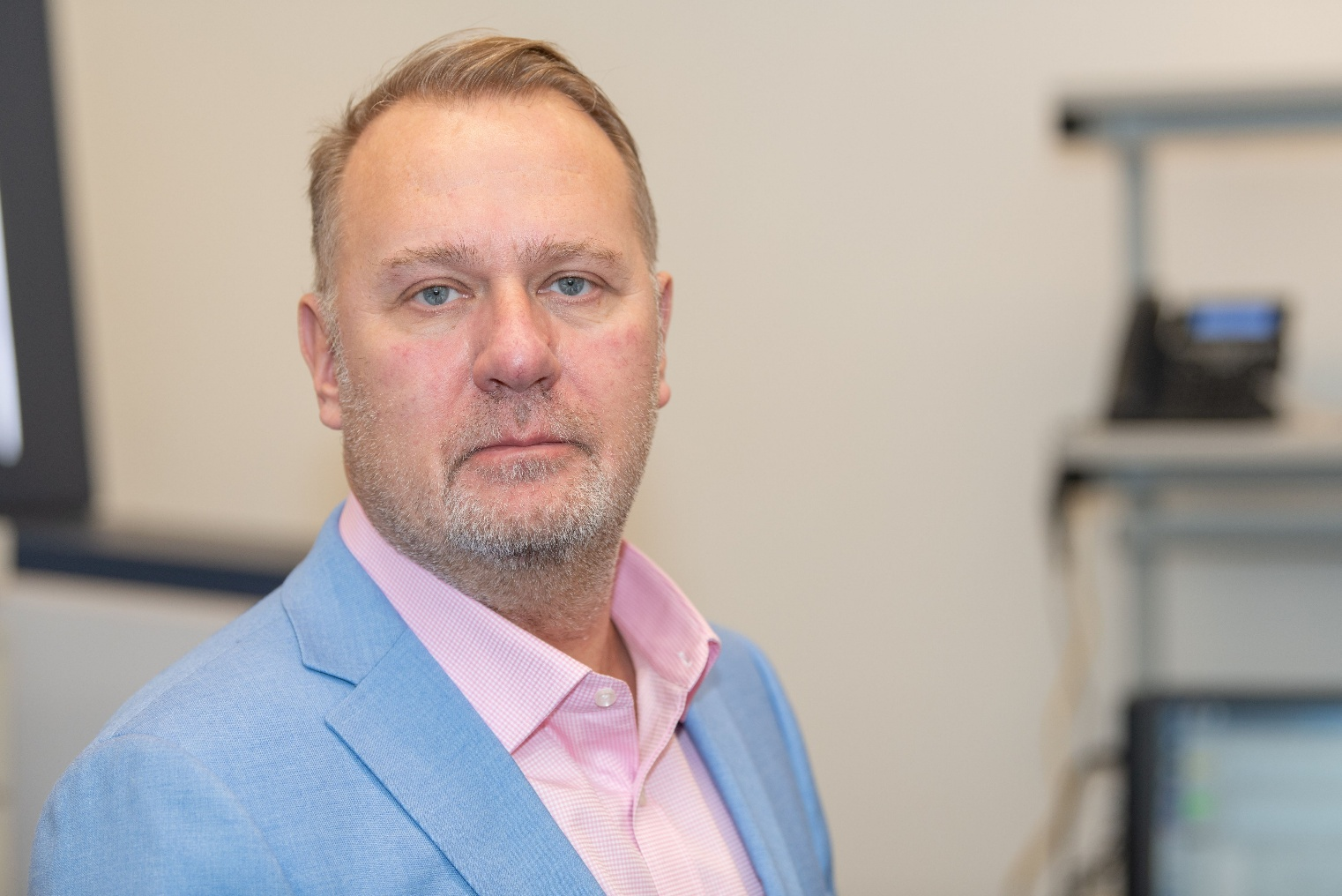
- Education: University of Konstanz (BS, MS, PhD)
- Known for: Multiplexed multiple reaction monitoring assays; immuno-MALDI (iMALDI); SysQuan
- Awards: Fellow, Canadian Academy of Health Sciences (2013); Genome BC Award for Scientific Excellence (2016); Fred P. Lossing Award (2023)
- Scientific career
- Fields: Proteomics, mass spectrometry
- Workplaces: McGill University; Lady Davis Institute for Medical Research; University of Victoria; University of North Carolina at Chapel Hill; National Institute of Environmental Health Sciences

Christoph H. Borchers is a scientist specializing in proteomics and mass spectrometry. He is a professor in the Gerald Bronfman Department of Oncology at McGill University in Montreal, where he holds the Segal Chair in Molecular Oncology and directs the Segal Cancer Proteomics Centre and the Warren Y. Soper Clinical Proteomics Centre at the Lady Davis Institute of the Jewish General Hospital.

Borchers works on mass spectrometry–based methods for quantitative and structural proteomics and on metabolomics, with applications in clinical research. Before moving to McGill he held the Don and Eleanor Rix BC Leadership Chair in Biomedical and Environmental Proteomics at the University of Victoria. He was elected a Fellow of the Canadian Academy of Health Sciences in 2013.

== Education and early career ==
Borchers earned his B.S., M.S. and Ph.D. degrees from the University of Konstanz in Germany. He completed postdoctoral training and worked as a staff scientist at the National Institute of Environmental Health Sciences (NIEHS), part of the National Institutes of Health, in North Carolina. From 2001 to 2006 he directed the UNC–Duke Proteomics Facility and held a faculty position in the Department of Biochemistry and Biophysics at the University of North Carolina at Chapel Hill medical school.

== Career ==
Borchers headed the University of Victoria–Genome BC Proteomics Centre from 2006 and from 2006 to 2019 was a professor in the Department of Biochemistry and Microbiology at the University of Victoria. At Victoria he held the Don and Eleanor Rix BC Leadership Chair in Biomedical and Environmental Proteomics. He subsequently moved to McGill University, where he now directs the Segal Cancer Proteomics Centre and the Warren Y. Soper Clinical Proteomics Centre.

He is a co-editor-in-chief of the journal Expert Review of Proteomics, published by Taylor & Francis.

Beyond his own laboratory, Borchers has taken on leadership roles in the proteomics community: he served on the Technology/Standards Committee of the Human Proteome Organization (HUPO), co-leading a work track on the harmonization of proteomics and quantification methods at the 2012 HUPO Proteomics Standards Initiative workshop, and later chaired the 14th HUPO World Congress, held in Vancouver in 2015. He was also one of three founding directors of the Canadian National Proteomics Network (CNPN), together with Guy Poirier and Ronald Beavis, chairing the 2008 workshop that established the network's organizing committee and later serving as its president.

== Research ==
Borchers' research centres on the development and application of proteomics and metabolomics technologies, particularly quantitative targeted proteomics for clinical diagnostics. As of July 2026, according to Google Scholar, his publications had been cited more than 33,000 times, with an h-index of 88.

=== Quantitative proteomics ===
A central theme of Borchers' work is the use of multiple reaction monitoring (MRM) mass spectrometry with stable isotope-labelled internal standard peptides to measure the absolute concentrations of proteins in complex biological samples such as blood plasma and tissues. His groups developed standardized, multiplexed LC-MRM assay panels for the quantitation of large numbers of proteins, characterizing them according to the assay-validation guidelines of the National Cancer Institute's Clinical Proteomic Tumor Analysis Consortium (CPTAC).

He was among the authors of a 2009 CPTAC multi-laboratory study in Nature Biotechnology that assessed the reproducibility, dynamic range and detection limits of MRM-based protein measurements across laboratories and instrument platforms. In a 2024 study, his group and collaborators designed and validated MRM assays for the quantitation of 2,118 proteins across 20 mouse organs and tissues, releasing the assays and reference data through an open-access database called MouseQuaPro.

He also worked on immuno-MALDI (iMALDI), a method that couples antibody-based enrichment of target peptides with MALDI mass spectrometry to quantify low-abundance proteins in clinical samples. He is the named inventor on a United States patent covering the underlying quantitation method, filed in 2003, granted in 2010 and assigned to the University of North Carolina at Chapel Hill. In a $3.3 million project funded through Genome Canada's Genomic Applications Partnership Program, Borchers and Gerald Batist developed an automated iMALDI assay quantifying the protein kinases Akt1 and Akt2, with AstraZeneca as the industry partner.

=== SysQuan ===
Extending this line of quantitative work, Borchers and collaborators, including René Zahedi, Robert Popp and Yassene Mohammed, developed SysQuan in the 2020s, a method for proteome-wide absolute quantitation of the human proteome. Absolute quantitation by MRM conventionally requires an individually synthesized stable isotope-labelled standard peptide for each target protein, which is costly and has largely restricted the approach to small protein panels. SysQuan instead uses tissues and biofluids from metabolically labelled (SILAC) mice as system-wide internal standards for matched human samples, making use of the large overlap in tryptic peptide sequences between the mouse and human proteomes.

In a 2025 study published in Molecular & Cellular Proteomics, the developers reported that the approach could in principle be applied to about two-thirds of the human proteome, using more than 150,000 tryptic peptides shared between the two species, and demonstrated it on human liver and plasma samples. The project received funding from Genome Canada and Génome Québec through the Canadian Biotechnology Innovation and Commercialization competition. As of 2026, SysQuan was being developed into commercial assay kits by MRM Proteomics. A US patent application for the method, naming Borchers, Zahedi and Mohammed as inventors, was published in April 2026.

=== Metabolomics ===
Borchers has also applied MRM-based mass spectrometry to targeted metabolomics. With Jun Han, he developed an LC–MS/MS method for profiling bile acids in human and mouse blood, combining the assay with a phospholipid-depletion solid-phase extraction step, which allowed a number of minor bile acids to be quantified in blood for the first time. The same collaboration produced a method for quantifying short-chain fatty acids in human feces, in which the acids are chemically derivatized with 3-nitrophenylhydrazine and measured against isotope-labelled internal standards.

=== Structural proteomics ===
A third area of Borchers' research is structural proteomics, which combines protein chemistry methods—such as cross-linking, hydrogen–deuterium exchange and photoaffinity labelling—with mass spectrometry and molecular modelling to study protein structure and interactions. This work includes the study of protein folding and misfolding associated with diseases such as Parkinson's disease and cystic fibrosis.

In 2011, Borchers co-founded the Symposium on Structural Proteomics with Evgeniy Petrotchenko, and the two have co-organized the international meeting annually since.

=== Clinical and translational applications ===
Much of this methodological work feeds directly into clinical practice: Borchers' laboratory has applied targeted mass spectrometry to cancer biomarkers and precision oncology, and to other clinical questions, including a 2024 study characterizing the proteomic changes from acute to post-acute (long) COVID-19.

His group has also investigated targeted proteomics for anti-doping applications, including a project funded by the Partnership for Clean Competition that used longitudinal blood-protein profiling to screen for blood doping.

From 2012 he was one of three project leaders, with Andrew Penn and Shelagh Coutts, on a $9.6 million Genome Canada large-scale applied research project that sought to develop a rapid, inexpensive blood test to distinguish transient ischaemic attacks from conditions that mimic them and reduce reliance on neuroimaging. The project produced an electronic triage tool that came into clinical use on Vancouver Island, alongside work on candidate protein biomarkers.

== Commercial activities ==
Borchers co-founded MRM Proteomics Inc. in 2010 as a spin-off commercializing proteomics technology developed at the University of Victoria–Genome BC Proteomics Centre. He serves as a scientific advisor to the company and chairs its board of directors. MRM Proteomics commercializes targeted proteomics assay kits, marketed under the name PeptiQuant, applying the MRM-based quantitation methods developed in Borchers' academic laboratories, and is developing kits based on the SysQuan method.

The company has since built a series of industry partnerships around this technology: it granted the lung cancer diagnostics firm Biodesix rights to use its iMALDI technology in blood-based diagnostic test development in 2018, and entered a co-marketing agreement with Agilent Technologies in 2022 to develop targeted proteomics assay kits for Agilent's mass spectrometry platforms. In 2023, a project led by Borchers with MRM Proteomics received $3.03 million through Genome Canada's Genomic Applications Partnership Program to develop "MutaQuant" mass spectrometry kits measuring the protein-level impact of around 1,000 known cancer mutations, to be commercialized by MRM Proteomics and Agilent.

In addition to MRM Proteomics, Borchers co-founded Molecular You, a Vancouver-based company offering blood-based multi-omic health assessments, where he serves as chief lab analytics officer, and Creative Molecules, Inc.

== Honours and awards ==
Borchers' contributions to proteomics have been recognized with fellowship in the Canadian Academy of Health Sciences (2013), the Genome BC Award for Scientific Excellence from Life Sciences British Columbia (2016), and the Canadian Society for Mass Spectrometry's Fred P. Lossing Award (2023), given for outstanding contributions to the field of mass spectrometry.

== Selected publications ==
- Addona, T. A.; et al. (2009). "Multi-site assessment of the precision and reproducibility of multiple reaction monitoring–based measurements of proteins in plasma". Nature Biotechnology. 27 (7): 633–641. doi:10.1038/nbt.1546.
- Petrotchenko, E. V.; Borchers, C. H. (2022). "Protein Chemistry Combined with Mass Spectrometry for Protein Structure Determination". Chemical Reviews. 122 (8): 7488–7499. doi:10.1021/acs.chemrev.1c00302.
- Mohammed, Y.; et al. (2025). "SysQuan: Repurposing SILAC Mice for the Cost-Effective Absolute Quantitation of the Human Proteome". Molecular & Cellular Proteomics. 24 (6): 100974. doi:10.1016/j.mcpro.2025.100974.
