= R. David Britt =

American scientist

Ralph David Britt
- Education: University of California, Berkeley M.S., Ph.D. (1988); North Carolina State University B.S. (1978)
- Scientific career
- Fields: Electron paramagnetic resonance, Bioinorganic chemistry
- Workplaces: University of California, Davis (1989–present)
- Thesis: Electron Spin Echo Spectroscopy of Photosynthesis (1988)
- Doctoral advisor: Melvin P. Klein
- Website: brittepr.ucdavis.edu

R. David Britt is the Winston Ko Chair and Distinguished Professor of Chemistry at the University of California, Davis. Britt uses electron paramagnetic resonance (EPR) spectroscopy to study metalloenzymes and enzymes containing organic radicals in their active sites. Britt is the recipient of multiple awards for his research, including the Bioinorganic Chemistry Award in 2019 and the Bruker Prize in 2015 from the Royal Society of Chemistry. He has received a Gold Medal from the International EPR Society (2014), and the Zavoisky Award from the Kazan Scientific Center of the Russian Academy of Sciences (2018). He is a Fellow of the American Association for the Advancement of Science and of the Royal Society of Chemistry.

== Early life and education ==
Britt studied at the North Carolina State University, graduating with his B.S. in physics in 1978. He completed his graduate studies in Physics at the University of California, Berkeley, graduating with his Ph.D. in 1988. At Berkeley, Britt worked in the laboratory of Prof. Melvin P. Klein as a NSF Graduate Research Fellow on the construction of a pulsed electron paramagnetic resonance (EPR) spectrometer. Britt was able to use the electron spin echo envelope modulation (ESEEM) technique with this spectrometer to study the molecular structure of the manganese-containing oxygen-evolving complex (OEC). Understanding of the OEC could improve our understanding of the mechanisms of the light-dependent reactions of photosynthesis, and could lead to the development of artificial photosynthesis.

== Independent career ==
Britt began his independent career at the University of California, Davis in 1989 as an assistant professor. He was promoted to associate professor in 1994, and to full professor in 1997. Since 2005, he has served as chair of the Department of Chemistry at Davis, and 2018 he was named the Winston Ko Professorship in Science Leadership.

== Research ==
Electron paramagnetic resonance (EPR) spectroscopy is a technique that measures the relaxation of unpaired electron spins in an applied magnetic field. This technique is particularly useful for studying the mechanism of catalysis of metalloenzymes and enzymes containing organic radicals, as these mechanistic intermediates often contain unpaired electrons and thus give a distinct EPR signal. Enzymatic systems that the Britt group studies include the oxygen-evolving complex of photosystem II, the H_{2}-producing [FeFe] hydrogenases, nitrogenases, and radical SAM enzymes.

With then-postdoctoral scholar Stefan Stoll, Britt developed EasySpin, an open-source MATLAB software toolbox for simulating and fitting a wide range of EPR spectra.

Britt has collaborated with many synthetic chemists and biologists, including Daniel G. Nocera, Philip P. Power, Michael A. Marletta, Elizabeth M. Nolan, William H. Casey, and Judith P. Klinman.
