= Bioinorganic Chemistry Award =

Award granted by the Royal Society of Chemistry

- Awarded for: outstanding research in any aspect of bioinorganic chemistry
- Sponsored by: Royal Society of Chemistry
- Date: 2008
- Reward: £2000
- Website: www.rsc.org/ScienceAndTechnology/Awards/BioinorganicChemistry/

The Bioinorganic Chemistry Award has been awarded by the Dalton division of the Royal Society of Chemistry every two years since 2009. The winner receives £2000 and undertakes a lecture tour in the UK. The award was discontinued in 2020.

== Winners ==
2019	R. David Britt	University of California, Davis
2017	Thomas R. Ward	University of Basel
2015	Paul J. Dyson	Ecole Polytechnique Fédérale de Lausanne
2013	Thomas V. O'Halloran	Northwestern University
2011	James A. Cowan	Ohio State University
2009	Chris Orvig	University of British Columbia

== See also ==
- List of chemistry awards
