= Charles Rees Award =

Award in the field of chemistry

- Awarded for: To reward excellence in the field of heterocyclic chemistry
- Sponsored by: Royal Society of Chemistry
- Date: 2008
- Reward: £2000
- Website: www.rsc.org/standards-and-recognition/prizes/interest-group-prizes/charles-rees-award

The Charles Rees Award is granted by the Royal Society of Chemistry to "reward excellence in the field of heterocyclic chemistry". It was established in 2008 and is awarded biennially. The winner receives £2000, a medal and a certificate, and delivers a lecture at the Lakeland Symposium, Grasmere, UK. Winners are chosen by the Heterocyclic and Synthesis Group, overseen by the Organic Division Awards Committee.

== Previous winners ==
Source: Royal Society of Chemistry

- 2024 – Darren Dixon, University of Oxford
- 2020 – David Procter
- 2018 – Andrew Smith, University of St Andrews, " for the development of organocatalysis methodology to synthesise new heterocyclic ring systems"
- 2016 – John Murphy, University of Strathclyde, "for his highly innovative studies on the preparation, properties and applications of very reactive heterocycles"
- 2014 – Timothy J. Donohoe, University of Oxford, "for his multiple contributions to modern heterocyclic chemistry".
- 2012 – Christopher J. Moody, University of Nottingham, "in recognition of his numerous outstanding contributions to heterocyclic chemistry, including the synthesis of a variety of heterocycles of biological interest, over a period of many years".
- 2010 – Anthony Barrett, Imperial College London, "in recognition of his outstanding contributions to synthetic and heterocyclic chemistry ranging from the total synthesis of complex natural products to the synthesis of multimetallic porphyrazine arrays."

== See also ==
- List of chemistry awards
