= Sir George Stokes Award =

Award granted by the Royal Society of Chemistry

The Sir George Stokes Award (colloquially the Stokes Medal) is named after George Gabriel Stokes and is awarded biennially by the Analytical Division of the Royal Society of Chemistry. It was established in 1999 to recognize the multidisciplinary nature of analytical chemistry and is given:

For outstanding and sustained contributions to analytical science by someone working in a complementary field, which has led to developments of seminal importance to chemical analysis.

There is no restriction on the nationality of those who can be considered for the award.

== Winners ==
Source: Royal Society of Chemistry

- 2019: Tuan Vo-Dinh, Duke University
- 2017: Tony Cass, Imperial College London
- 2015: Sergei G. Kazarian, Imperial College London
- 2013: Richard P. Van Duyne
- 2011: Richard Compton
- 2009: Robin Clark
- 2007: Kenneth Suslick
- 2005: John Meurig Thomas
- 2003: No award
- 2001: Karl H. Norris
- 1999: Alec Jeffreys

== See also ==
- List of chemistry awards
