= Materials for Industry – Derek Birchall Award =

Award given by the Royal Society of Chemistry for contributions to materials chemistry

- Awarded for: Contributions to materials chemistry
- Sponsored by: Royal Society of Chemistry
- Date: 2008
- Country: United Kingdom (international)
- Reward(s): £2000

The Materials for Industry – Derek Birchall Award is awarded biennially to an individual who has made an exceptional contribution to the application of materials chemistry in industry. The recipient of the award is chosen by an independent committee consisting of experts from both the Materials Chemistry Division (MCD) and industry. The award is given by the Royal Society of Chemistry and the chosen winner is rewarded with a monetary prize of £2000. The award was discontinued in 2020.

== Award History ==
The award was established in 2008, in honour of work carried out by British inventor and materials chemist Derek Birchall (born 1930).

== Awardees ==
Source: RSC

- 2009: Patrick McGrail, University of Sheffield
- 2013: Professor John W. Goodby, University of York
- 2015: Professor Tobin Marks, Northwestern University
- 2017: Professor Karl Coleman, Durham University
- 2019: Professor Andrew Mills, Queen's University, Belfast

== See also ==
- List of chemistry awards
