= Applied Catalysis Award =

Award granted by the Royal Society of Chemistry

- Awarded for: Creativity and excellence in novel approaches or use of catalysis in industry.
- Sponsored by: Royal Society of Chemistry
- Date: 2008
- Presented by: Royal Society of Chemistry
- Reward: £2000
- Website: www.rsc.org/ScienceAndTechnology/Awards/AppliedCatalysisAward/

The Applied Catalysis Award is awarded by the Royal Society of Chemistry to individuals for "creativity and excellence in novel approaches or use of catalysis in industry." The award was established in 2008. The winner of the award is chosen by the Industry & Technology Division Awards Committee, and receives £2000, a medal and a certificate.

== Previous winners ==
Source: RSC

Year	Winner	Affiliation	Recognition
2024	Steve Wisniewski	Bristol Myers Squibb	For his innovation and creativity in Earth Abundant Metal Catalysis and their application in organometallic chemistry for pharmaceuticals
2022	Peter Johnston	Johnson Matthey	For his contributions in gold catalysis chemistry, including the replacement of mercury catalysts in the commercial production of vinyl chloride from acetylene hydrochlorination and the vinyl acetate monomer process.
2020	Carin Johansson Seechurn	Johnson Matthey	For diligent and passionate work to develop and commercialize precious metal complexes to promote homogeneous catalysis for real world industrial applications.
2018	Ying Zheng	University of Edinburgh	for the development and application of recyclable, heterogeneous nanocatalyst
2016	David Johnson	Lucite International	for the development of the Lucite Alpha process
2014	Douglas Stephan	University of Toronto	For the development of new commercially viable, transition-metal based and metal-free catalyst technologies for polymerization, hydrogenation and metathesis.
2012	Thomas Colacot	Johnson Matthey	for exceptional contributions to the development and availability of ligands and catalysts crucial for the advancement of metal-catalysed synthetic organic chemistry.
2010	Martyn Twigg	Johnson Matthey	for his pivotal and innovative role in creating new catalysts and catalytic processes for use in the automotive industry.

== See also ==
- List of chemistry awards
