= Applied Inorganic Chemistry Award =

Award granted by the Royal Society of Chemistry

The Applied Inorganic Chemistry Award, established in 2008, is conferred biennially by the Dalton division of the Royal Society of Chemistry for "outstanding contributions to the development of any branch of inorganic chemistry which has an application in industry." The winner gives a lecture tour in the UK, and receives a medal and £2000. The award was discontinued in 2020.

== Winners ==
2019	Claire J. Carmalt	University College London
2017	Manfred Bochmann	University of East Anglia
2015	Yi Lu	University of Illinois at Urbana-Champaign
2013	Andrew R. Barron	Rice University
2011	Russell E. Morris	University of St Andrews
2009	Jonathan R. Dilworth	University of Oxford

== See also ==
- List of chemistry awards
