= Canadian Society for Mass Spectrometry =

Learned chemical society from Canada

The Canadian Society for Mass Spectrometry is an organization that promotes mass spectrometry in Canada. The goal of the society is to stimulate interest and collaborations in the Canadian mass spectrometry community. The society organizes conferences, awards prices and runs an online job board. The society is an affiliate society of the International Mass Spectrometry Foundation. Its current president is Derek Wilson.

The society awards the annual Fred P. Lossing Award.
