= Tilden Prize =

Chemistry award

- Sponsored by: Royal Society of Chemistry
- Date: 1939
- Reward: £5000
- Website: www.rsc.org/standards-and-recognition/prizes/research-and-innovation-prizes/tilden-prize-for-chemistry

The Tilden Prize is an award that is made by the Royal Society of Chemistry for advances in chemistry. The award was established in 1939 and commemorates Sir William A. Tilden, a prominent British chemist. The prize runs annually with up to three prizes available. Winners receive £5,000, a medal and certificate.

== Recipients ==
Recipients of the award, given since 1939, include:

- 2026 – Angelos Michaelides, Eli Zysman-Colman, Jonathan Nitschke
- 2025 – Rachel O'Reilly, Perdita Barran, Dave Adams
- 2024 – Claire J. Carmalt, Erwin Reisner
- 2023 – Craig Banks, Darren Dixon, Julie Macpherson
- 2022 – Timothy Donohoe, Christopher Hardacre, David K. Smith
- 2021 – Jonathan Reid, Jonathan W. Steed, Charlotte Williams
- 2020 – Christiane Timmel, Stephen Liddle, Jianliang Xiao
- 2019 – Russell E. Morris, Eric Mcinnes, James Naismith
- 2018 – Euan Brechin, Jonathan Clayden, Simon Duckett
- 2017 – Jas Pal Badyal, Lucy Carpenter, Neil McKeown
- 2016 – Véronique Gouverneur, Dermot O'Hare, Ivan P. Parkin
- 2015 – Mark Bradley, Leroy Cronin, David J. Wales
- 2014 – Andrew Ian Cooper, Guy Lloyd-Jones, Iain McCulloch
- 2013 – Steven Armes, Eleanor Campbell, Steven Nolan
- 2012 – Harry Anderson, James R. Durrant, Patrick Unwin
- 2011 – Jeremy Hutson, John Sutherland, Richard Winpenny
- 2010 – Duncan Bruce, David Leigh, Kosmas Prassides
- Tilden Lectureship 2009/2010 – Philip N. Bartlett, Peter Bruce, Philip Page
- 2009 – Andrew Orr-Ewing, Ian Paterson, Christopher Hunter
- 2008 – Varinder Aggarwal, Colin D. Bain, Ian Manners
- 2007 – Kenneth David Maclean Harris, David Logan, Nigel Simon Simpkins
- 2006 – David O'Hagan, John M.C. Plane, Matthew Rosseinsky
- 2005 – Paul D. Beer, Richard G. Compton, David W. Knight
- 2004 – Patrick Fowler, Timothy C. Gallagher, Vernon C. Gibson
- 2003 – Andrew Holmes, David Parker, Stephen Keith Scott
- 2002 – Anthony P. Davis, John Goodby, Peter Anthony Tasker
- 2001 – Lynn Gladden, Martin Schröder, Thomas J. Simpson
- 2000 – David J. Cole-Hamilton, Christopher J. Moody, Klaus Müller-Dethlefs
- 1999 – Jonathan N. L. Connor, A. Guy Orpen, Richard J. K. Taylor
- 1998 – Geoffrey Cloke, Dominic Tildesley, William B. Motherwell
- 1997 – David Clary, Stephen G. Davies, David E. Fenton
- 1996 – Michael Ashfold, James Feast, David W. H. Rankin
- 1995 – Jeremy K. Burdett, Anthony J. Stace, Eric James Thomas
- 1994 – Anthony Barrett, Robert J. Donovan, John Evans
- 1993 – Peter Edwards, Paul Madden, Douglas W. Young
- 1992 – Selby Knox, Philip Kocienski, Robin Perutz
- 1991 – Graham Fleming, John Forster Nixon, Gerald Pattenden
- 1990 – John M. Brown, Martyn Poliakoff, Robert K. Thomas
- 1989 – Anthony Legon, Michael Mingos, Jim Staunton
- 1988 – Brian F. G. Johnson, David Anthony King, Stephen V. Ley
- 1987 – David Husain, Anthony Kirby, Kenneth Wade
- 1986 – Mark Child, Brian T. Heaton, Robert Ramage
- 1985 – David Garner, Ronald Grigg, J H Pritchard
- 1984 – David Thomas Clark, Ian O. Sutherland, Alfred Geoffrey Sykes
- 1983 – Robin Clark, Ian William Murison Smith, Dudley Howard Williams
- 1982 – C. Robin Ganellin, Malcolm Green, John Philip Simons
- 1981 – Harold Kroto, Jon McCleverty, Andrew Pelter
- 1980 – Edward W. Abel, Ian Fleming, Roger Grice
- 1979 – John Albery, Jack Baldwin, Peter Maitlis
- 1978 – James K. Sutherland, James Johnson Turner
- 1977 – Neville B. H. Jonathan, Karl Howard Overton
- 1976 – Richard Norman, Meirion Wyn Roberts
- 1975 – Alan R. Katritzky, John White
- 1974 – Gordon W. Kirby, Bernard L. Shaw
- 1973 – Charles Wayne Rees, John Meurig Thomas
- 1972 – Alan Carrington, Michael F. Lappert
- 1971 – John Cadogan, F. Gordon A. Stone
- 1970 – Leslie Crombie, Ronald Mason
- 1969 – William David Ollis, Robert Williams
- 1968 – Robert Haszeldine, David W. Turner
- 1967 – Richard Clive Cookson, Jack Lewis
- 1966 – Norman Greenwood, Basil Weedon
- 1965 – Brian Thrush, Mark C. Whiting
- 1964 – A. David Buckingham, Franz Sondheimer
- 1963 – Victor M. Clark, Aubrey Trotman-Dickenson
- 1962 – Alan Battersby, Rex Richards
- 1961 – Joseph Chatt, Bernard Henbest
- 1960 – Ronald Nyholm, Ralph Raphael
- 1959 – Charles Kemball, Peter Pauson
- 1958 – James Baddiley, George Porter
- 1957 – Richard Maling Barrer, Basil Lythgoe
- 1956 – Ernest Alexander Rudolf Braude, Geoffrey Gee
- 1955 – Douglas Hugh Everett, George Wallace Kenner
- 1954 – Michael J. S. Dewar, Christopher Longuet-Higgins
- 1953 – John Stuart Anderson, Alan Woodworth Johnson
- 1952 – Derek Barton, Herbert Marcus Powell
- 1951 – Charles Coulson, Donald Holroyde Hey
- 1950 – Frederick Dainton, Francis Leslie Rose
- 1949 – Meredith Gwynne Evans, Frank Stuart Spring
- 1948 – C. E. H. Bawn, Frederick Ernest King
- 1947 – Ernest Gordon Cox, Ewart Jones
- 1946 – Albert Ernest Alexander, Maurice Stacey
- 1945 – Edward David Hughes, William Alexander Waters
- 1944 – Wilson Baker, John Monteath Robertson
- 1943 – Frederick George Mann, Harold Warris Thompson
- 1942 – Ronald P. Bell, John Masson Gulland
- 1941 – Harry Julius Emeléus, Robert Downs Haworth
- 1940 – Harry Melville, Alexander R. Todd
- 1939 – Edmund Hirst, Leslie Sutton

== See also ==
- List of chemistry awards
