= Bill Price (physicist) =

British physicist (1909–1993)

Professor William Charles Price FRS (1 April 1909 – 10 March 1993) was a British physicist (spectroscopy). Brought up in Swansea, he spent his career at the universities of Cambridge and London. His work was important for identifying the hydrogen bond structure of DNA base pairs.

== Early life and studies ==
William Charles Price was born on 1 April 1909. He went to the Bishop Gore School in Swansea, where his contemporaries included the young poet Dylan Thomas, whose father taught English at the school. He failed to get a state scholarship to Oxford in 1927. He gained a BSc in Physics from Swansea University in 1930.

Price then spent three years as a Fellow at Johns Hopkins University in Baltimore, Maryland, USA.

He was appointed to the University of Cambridge on a 1851 Research Fellowship in 1935, at the university's Physical Chemical Laboratory - working with Martin Lowry until 1936, then with Ronald George Wreyford Norrish. In 1937 he became university demonstrator; and from 1938 a Prize Fellow of Trinity College, Cambridge. At Cambridge he worked with John Lennard-Jones and Sydney Chapman. In 1938 he was awarded the Royal Institute of Chemistry's Meldola Medal and Prize.

== Career ==
He worked at the Royal Aircraft Establishment in the field of ultra-violet absorption spectroscopy, working with Fred Dainton. He set up a spectroscopic group at Imperial Chemical Industries (ICI) at Billingham Manufacturing Plant in 1943.

=== King's College London ===
From 1948 to 1976 he worked at the Wheatstone Physics Laboratory at King's College London. During this period he became a Fellow of the Royal Society (1959), Wheatstone Professor of Physics (1962) and Dean of the Faculty of Science (1966 to 1968).

At King's College London he was a pioneer of identifying Rydberg series ultra-violet absorption spectra. He was encouraged by his head of department (the Wheatstone Professor) to look at many substances with spectroscopic techniques, and at the time there was much interest in the structure and function of DNA and proteins. It was through his work with infra-red absorption spectroscopy that the alignment of the hydrogen bonds of the DNA base pairs, relative to the DNA fibre axis, was found.

== Personal life ==
In August 1939 Price married Nest Davies, (whose father had been a science teacher). They had a son and daughter.

Price died on 10 March 1993, aged 83.

== See also ==
- Donald Holroyde Hey

Academic offices
Preceded by	Wheatstone Professor of Physics; 1962 – 1976	Succeeded by Michael Hart
