= Ana Flávia Nogueira =

Brazilian chemist and academic

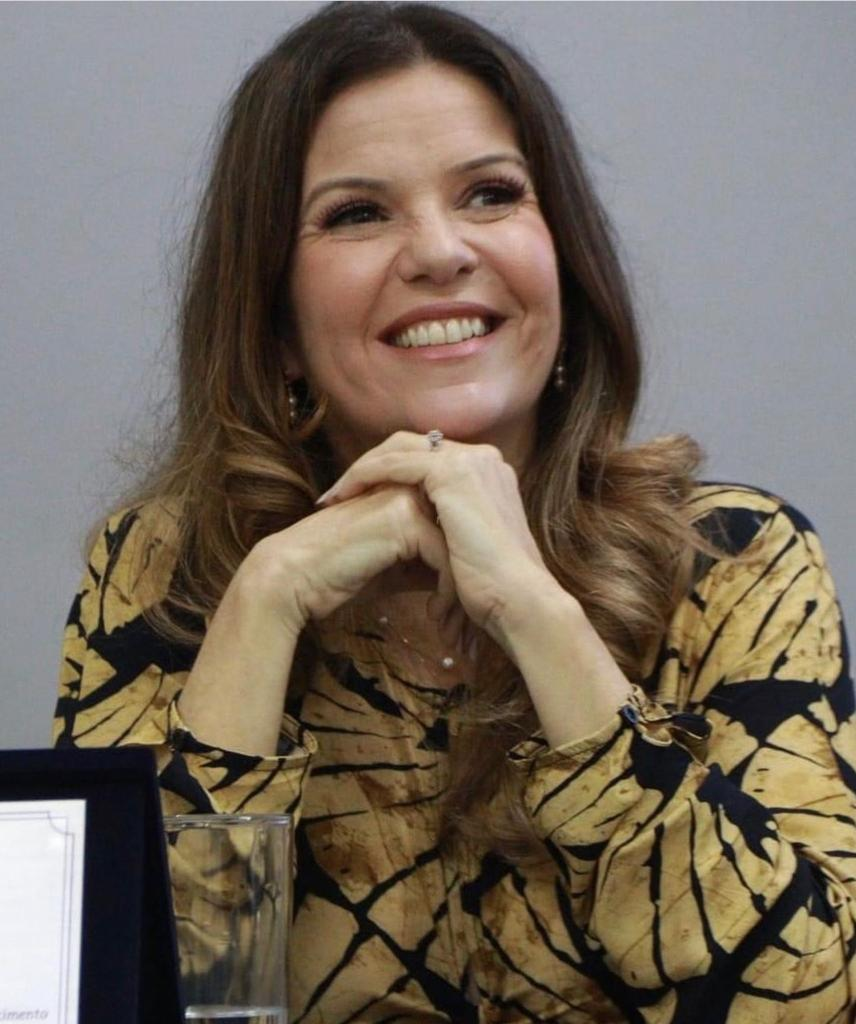
- Ana Flávia Nogueira in 2023
- Born: 1973 (age 52–53)
- Education: University of São Paulo; State University of Campinas (Ph.D., 2001)
- Children: 2
- Scientific career
- Workplaces: Imperial College London; State University of Campinas
- Thesis: Gratzel’s solar cells using polymer electrolyte
- Doctoral advisor: Marco-Aurelio De Paoli
- Other academic advisors: James Durrant
- Website: www.linkedin.com/in/ana-flavia-nogueira-b3746b/

Ana Flávia Nogueira (born 1973) is a Brazilian chemist who is a Full Professor at the State University of Campinas (Unicamp) since 2004. Her research considers nanostructured materials for solar energy conversion. She was elected to the Brazilian Academy of Science in 2022.

== Early life and education ==
Ana Flávia Nogueira was born in Bragança Paulista in Brazil. She earned an undergraduate degree in chemistry at the University of São Paulo, then completed graduate research at the Unicamp, where she started investigating polymer electrolytes for dye-sensitized solar cells. Her doctoral research was the first in Brazil to make use of dye-sensitized solar cells. She spent part of her PhD at Imperial College London, where she worked with Prof. James Durrant on ultrafast laser spectroscopy. After earning her doctorate of inorganic chemistry in 2001, she returned to the Durrant laboratory in London. After leaving London, she worked with Prof. Niyazi Serdar Sarıçiftçi, then returned to Brazil in 2003, working in the group of Prof. Henrique E. Toma. In 2017 she was visiting professor at Stanford University, working in collaboration with Prof. Michael F. Toney in the use of synchrotron radiation applied to halide perovskite solar cells.

== Research and career ==
Ana Flávia Nogueira established her own research group at Unicamp, where she investigates nanostructure materials for solar energy conversion based on oxides, chalcogenides and carbon structures. In the last years, her particular focus stands on perovskite solar cells and perovskite quantum dots for emission applications. Her group is also investigating cheap and abundant photocatalysis for green hydrogen production. Alongside novel materials science, she patterned with the Brazilian Synchrotron Light Laboratory to develop in situ experiments with the use of synchrotron radiation to study the formation, crystallization and degradation of halide perovskite structures.

Ana Flávia Nogueira was announced director of CINE, the Center for Innovation in New Energies, in 2020. In 2022, she was elected to the Brazilian Academy of Science and Fellow of the Royal Society of Chemistry. In 2025 she was elected as representative for Brazilian's national investment on energy innovation by the MCTI minister Luciana Barbosa de Oliveira Santos.

Ana Flávia is associate editor of the Journal of Materials Chemistry C and Materials Advances, both from Royal Society of Chemistry.

== Awards and honours ==
- 2020: Award for Brazilian Women in Chemistry and Related Sciences
- 2022: Elected to the Brazilian Academy of Science

== Selected publications ==
- In Situ and Operando Characterizations of Metal Halide Perovskite and Solar Cells: Insights from Lab-Sized Devices to Upscaling Processes, Rodrigo Szostak et al.; Chemical Reviews 2023, 123, 6, 3160–3236. https://pubs.acs.org/doi/abs/10.1021/acs.chemrev.2c00382
- Structural Origins of Light-Induced Phase Segregation in Organic-Inorganic Halide Perovskite Photovoltaic Materials Rachel E. Beal et al. Matter v. 2, i. 1, p. 207-219, 2020. https://doi.org/10.1016/j.matt.2019.11.001
- Mark V. Khenkin; Eugene A. Katz; Antonio Abate; et al. (January 2020). "Consensus statement for stability assessment and reporting for perovskite photovoltaics based on ISOS procedures". Nature Energy. 5 (1): 35–49. doi:10.1038/s41560-019-0529-5. ISSN 2058-7546. Wikidata Q115170659.
- Dye-Sensitized Nanocrystalline Solar Cells Employing a Polymer Electrolyte, A. F. Nogueira et al. Advanced Materials, Volume13, Issue11, June, 2001, Pages 826–830. https://doi.org/10.1002/1521-4095(200106)13:11<826::AID-ADMA826>3.0.CO;2-L
