= James Durrant =

James Durrant may refer to:

- James Durrant (chemist), professor of photochemistry at Imperial College London
- James Durrant (Australian Army officer) (1885–1963), Australian army general
