= Edward Harrison Memorial Prize =

The Edward Harrison Memorial Prize was awarded from 1926 to 1979 by the Chemical Society and from 1980 to 2007 by its successor the Royal Society of Chemistry to a British chemist who was under 32 years of age, and working the fields of theoretical or physical chemistry. It commemorated the work of Edward Harrison who was credited with producing the first serviceable gas mask and whose work saved many lives.

In 2008 the prize was joined with the Meldola Medal and Prize to form the Harrison-Meldola Memorial Prizes.

== Winners ==
Winners include

- For 2009 onwards, see Harrison-Meldola Memorial Prizes
- 2007: Katherine Holt
- 2006: Saif A. Haque
- 2005: Rosalind J. Allen
- 2004: Sharon Ashbrook
- 2003: Claire Vallance
- 2002: Carole A. Morrison
- 2001: Nicholas E. Leadbeater, Jonathan Reid
- 2000: Jonathan P. K. Doye
- 1999: Andrew E. H. Wheatley
- 1998: No award
- 1997: Mark Wilson
- 1996: Helen H. Fielding
- 1995: Matthew G. Davidson
- 1994: Andrew Orr-Ewing
- 1993: Jas Pal Badyal
- 1992: Colin D. Bain
- 1991: Matthew Rosseinsky
- 1990: Luet-Lok Wong
- 1989: Joe Crayston
- 1988: Peter J. Knowles
- 1987: Kenneth Dawson
- 1984: Stephen Keith Scott
- 1981: Anthony Barrett
- 1978: Myron Wyn Evans
- 1974: C Masters
- 1971: G. Michael Bancroft
- 1968: Geoffrey Luckhurst
- 1965: G Williams
- 1962: Alan Carrington
- 1959: A. David Buckingham
- 1956: Leslie Orgel
- 1953: Ronald Gillespie
- 1950: H. Christopher Longuet-Higgins
- 1947: Derek Barton
- 1944: Leslie F. Wiggins
- 1941: Norman Rydon
- 1938: Alexander King
- 1935: Leslie Sutton
- 1932: Harry Julius Emeléus
- 1929: Patrick Linstead
- 1926: Charles Harington

== See also ==
- List of chemistry awards
