= Darren Dixon =

Darren Dixon may refer to:

- Darren Dixon (motorcyclist), English motorcycle racer
- Darren J. Dixon (born 1971), British organic chemist
- D Double E (Darren Jason Dixon, born 1980), British grime MC, DJ and record producer
