= Meldola Medal and Prize =

- Sponsored by: Royal Society of Chemistry
- Date: 1921
- Reward: £500
- Website: www.rsc.org/ScienceAndTechnology/Awards/Archive/Meldola/

The Meldola Medal and Prize was awarded annually from 1921 to 1979 by the Chemical Society and from 1980 to 2008 by the Royal Society of Chemistry to a British chemist who was under 32 years of age for promising original investigations in chemistry (which had been published). It commemorated Raphael Meldola, President of the Maccabaeans and the Institute of Chemistry. The prize was the sum of £500 and a bronze medal.

The prize was modified in 2008 and joined the Edward Harrison Memorial Prize to become the Harrison-Meldola Memorial Prizes.

== Winners ==
Awardees include:

- For 2009 onwards, see Harrison-Meldola Memorial Prizes
- 2008: Hon Wai Lam, Rachel O'Reilly
- 2006: Richard Layfield, Rebecca Goss
- 2005: Rosalind J. Allen, Matthew L. Clarke
- 2004: Milo Shaffer, Charlotte Williams
- 2003: Ian Fairlamb, Nicholas R. Walker, Claire Vallance
- 2002: Gregory L. Challis, Michael A. Hayward
- 2001: Adam Nelson
- 2000: Claire J. Carmalt
- 1999: Ben G. Davis, Peter A. O'Brien
- 1998: Stephen P. Marsden, Jonathan W. Steed
- 1997: Jonathan Clayden, J. S. O. Evans
- 1996: D. W. Lewis, Michael Shipman
- 1995: Alan Armstrong
- 1994: James R. Durrant
- 1993: Martin Wills, Dominic S. Wright
- 1992: Christopher A. Hunter, David J. Wales
- 1991: Paul Attfield, Kenneth David Maclean Harris
- 1990: Andrew R. Barron
- 1989: Susan E. Thomas (later Gibson), Mark T. Weller
- 1988: Robert E. Mulvey, Nigel Simon Simpkins
- 1987: Paul D. Beer, James H. Keeler
- 1986: Andrew Mills, Nicholas C. Norman
- 1985: John S. Foord
- 1984: James R. Darwent, Ian P. Rothwell
- 1983: Richard A. Jones, Ian Paterson
- 1982: A. Guy Orpen, Ivan Powis
- 1981: David Clary, Alan Dilks
- 1980: Anthony Barrett
- 1979: Myron Wyn Evans
- 1978: John Evans
- 1977: Eric Oldfield
- 1976: Jeremy K. Burdett, Martyn Poliakoff
- 1975: Jeremy Sanders
- 1974: Peter J. Derrick
- 1973: Jonathan N. L. Connor, Brian P. Roberts
- 1972: Geoffrey Ozin
- 1971: G. Michael Bancroft, John F. Kennedy
- 1970: George M. Sheldrick
- 1969: Peter Atkins
- 1968: Malcolm Gerloch, Geoffrey Luckhurst
- 1967: Terence J. Kemp
- 1966: Dudley Howard Williams
- 1965: Robert David Gillard
- 1964: John Stuart Brimacombe, John J. Rooney
- 1963: Alan Carrington
- 1962: James Trotter
- 1961: John N. Murrell, Richard Norman
- 1960: J. N. Bradley
- 1959: John Cadogan, Thomas Cudworth Waddington
- 1957: D. J. Manners
- 1956: Thomas Summers West
- 1955: Peter Gray
- 1954: John Shipley Rowlinson
- 1953: Robert Haszeldine
- 1952: Tom L. Cottrell, Basil Weedon
- 1951: Charles Kemball, George Wallace Kenner
- 1950: Ernest Alexander Rudolf Braude
- 1949: Andrew John Blackford Robertson
- 1948: Ralph Raphael
- 1947: James Baddiley
- 1946: Alan Woodworth Johnson, Robert Harold Stokes
- 1941: Clement Henry Bamford
- 1940: Ewart Jones
- 1939: Norman Rydon
- 1938: William C. Price
- 1937: Ronald P. Bell
- 1936: Edward David Hughes, Alexander R. Todd
- 1935: Harry Melville
- 1933: Maurice Stacey
- 1932: Leslie Sutton
- 1931: Guy Frederic Marrian
- 1930: Patrick Linstead
- 1929: Richard Alan Morton
- 1928: John Alfred Valentine Butler
- 1927: Juda Quastel
- 1926: Ronald Norrish
- 1925: Henry Phillips
- 1924: Leslie Julius Harris
- 1923: Cyril Hinshelwood
- 1922: Christopher Kelk Ingold
- 1921: Christopher Kelk Ingold

== See also ==
- List of chemistry awards
