= David E. Aspnes =

American physicist

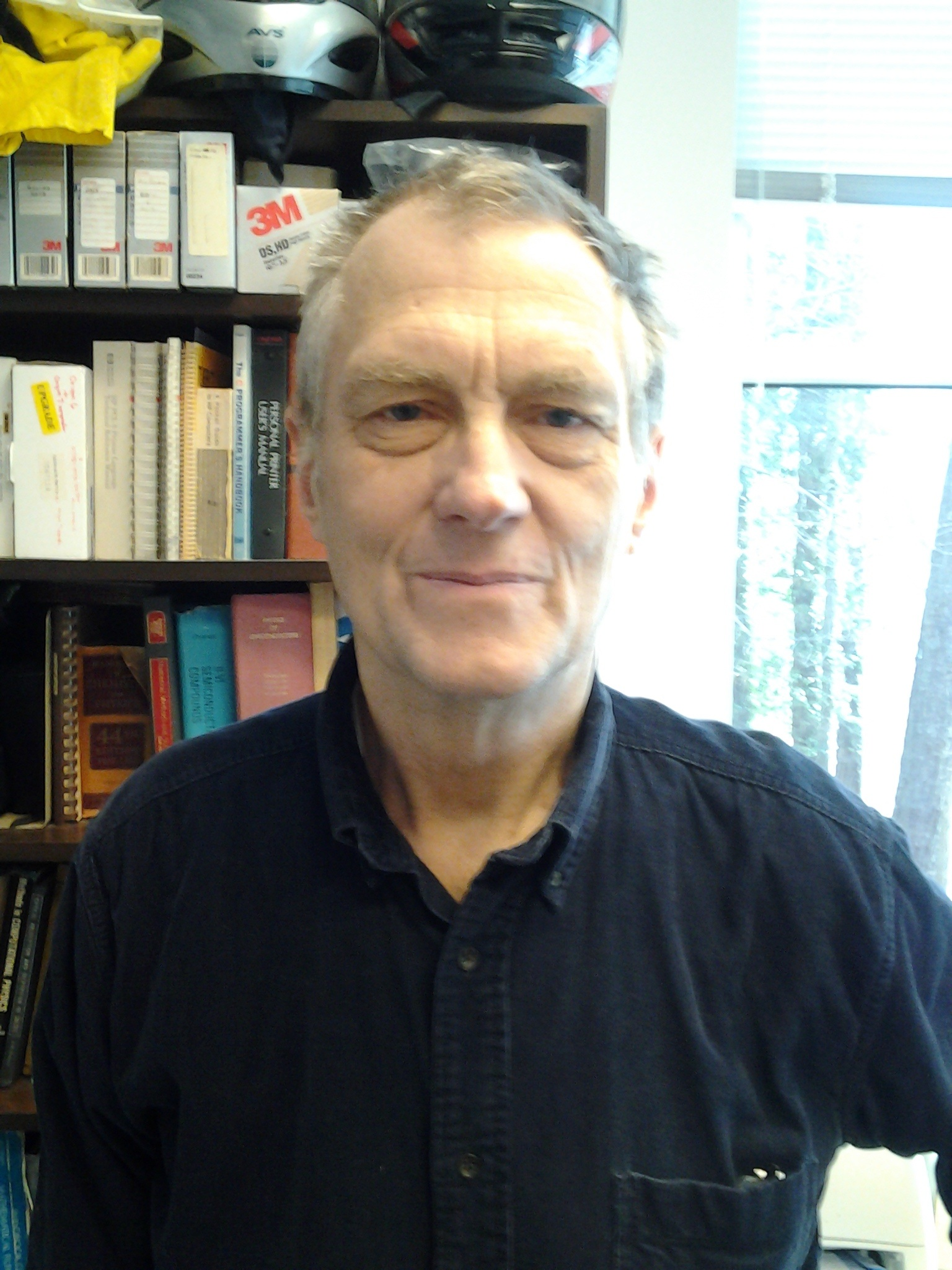
- Born: 1 May 1939 (age 87); Madison, Wisconsin, United States
- Education: University of Illinois at Urbana-Champaign; University of Wisconsin–Madison
- Scientific career
- Fields: Condensed matter physics; surface physics; optics: expt. and theor.
- Workplaces: North Carolina State University

David Erik Aspnes (born 1 May 1939 in Madison, Wisconsin) is an American physicist and a member of the National Academy of Sciences (1998). Aspnes developed fundamental theories of the linear and nonlinear optical properties of materials and thin films, and the technology of spectroscopic ellipsometry (SE). SE is a metrology that is used in the manufacture of integrated circuits.

== Biography ==
Aspnes grew up on a dairy farm in the Madison area, attending a one-room country school. Aspnes earned a Bachelors of Science in 1960 and a Masters of Science in 1961, in electrical engineering at the University of Wisconsin - Madison. He continued his education at the University of Illinois at Urbana-Champaign, where he received a Ph.D. degree in physics with a mathematics minor in 1965. Aspnes spent a postdoctoral year at UIUC, where he wrote several papers on the effect of electric fields on the optical properties of materials, and a second year at Brown University, where he began experimental work in the same field. In 1967 he joined the research area of Bell Laboratories in Murray Hill, New Jersey, as a member of the technical staff.

At Bell Labs Aspnes pursued his interest in the optical properties of materials and thin films, and their use not only to characterize the type of material but also its nanostructure. When the operating companies were divested from AT&T in 1984, Aspnes moved to Bellcore, the Bell Laboratories of the operating companies, where he continued research as head of the interface physics and later interface physics and optical sciences department.

In 1992 Aspnes joined the department of physics of North Carolina State University, where he is a distinguished university professor of physics, emeritus. Although he retired 01 Jan 2025 he remains active in research both at NCSU and with external organizations. He has published over 500 papers, and holds 23 patents.

== Awards and honors ==
- 1973 Elected Fellow of the American Physical Society
- 1976 Alexander von Humboldt Senior Scientist Award
- 1979 Elected Fellow Optical Society of America
- 1987 Wood Prize of the Optical Society of America
- 1993 John Yarwood Memorial Medal of the British Vacuum Council
- 1996 Elected Fellow of the American Vacuum Society
- 1996 Frank Isakson Prize for Optical Effects in Solids
- 1996 Alumni Outstanding Research Award – North Carolina State University
- 1996 Elected Fellow – Society of Photo-Optical Instrumentation Engineers
- 1997 Max-Planck – Gesellschaft Prize for International Cooperation
- 1998 Medard W. Welch Award of the American Vacuum Society
- 1998 Elected Member of the National Academy of Sciences
- 2002 Elected Fellow – American Association for the Advancement of Science
- 2011 Mentor Award, Society of Vacuum Coaters
- 2014 Elected Fellow of the National Academy of Inventors
