= Katherine Holt =

British chemist

- Born: Katherine B. Holt; 1977 (age 48–49); United Kingdom
- Education: University of Oxford
- Awards: Edward Harrison Memorial Prize (2007)
- Scientific career
- Fields: Electrochemistry; In-situ spectroscopy Surfaces; Electrolytes
- Workplaces: University of Texas at Austin; University College London
- Thesis: Characterisation and Applications of Boron-Doped Diamond Electrodes (2002)
- Doctoral advisor: John Foord
- Website: iris.ucl.ac.uk/iris/browse/profile?upi=KHOLT76

Katherine B. Holt (born 1977) is a British chemist who is a professor at University College London. She serves as Vice Dean for Education in the Department of Mathematics and Physical Sciences. Her research investigates the development of carbon-based electrodes and electrocatalysis.

== Early life and education ==
Holt was born in the United Kingdom. Her parents were both chemistry teachers and she grew up around chemistry textbooks. She studied chemistry throughout high school, and was accepted to study in the Department of Chemistry at the University of Oxford. During her final year at Oxford, she joined the research group of John Foord, with whom she studied diamond thin films. She focussed on the creation of boron-doped diamond, which could be used as highly conductive electrodes. Holt stayed at the University of Oxford for doctoral research, where she looked to apply her conductive diamond films to electrochemical water waste treatment.

== Research and career ==
Holt became interested in research in the United States, and applied to the laboratory of Allen J. Bard at the University of Texas at Austin, where she started to work on biological systems, such as studying the impact of silver ions on Escherichia coli respiration. After two years in Texas, Holt returned to the United Kingdom, where she joined University College London. She worked as a Centenary Ramsay Fellow. She was appointed an Engineering and Physical Sciences Research Council advanced research fellow in 2006 and a lecturer at University College London in 2007. In 2018 she was promoted to Professor of Chemistry at UCL.

Holt's research investigates the use of chemistry to better understand biological processes. In particular, she has studied the creation and application of functional diamonds-based nanomaterials. She has shown that boron-doped and nanocrystalline diamond can be grown on metals using chemical vapor deposition, creating highly conductive thin films that can be used to detect metabolic products of living cells. She has studied diamond nanoparticles, which may find application in drug delivery and cellular imaging. Holt showed that diamond can be redox active, a surprising observation given diamond has a bandage of 5.47 eV and is generally considered an insulator. Instead, Holt believes that the redox properties of diamond originate in unsaturated surface bonds, as these interactions can dominate when nanoparticle size is < 5 nm.

=== Selected publications ===
- Jose Ruben Morones; Jose Luis Elechiguerra; Alejandra Camacho; Katherine Holt; Juan B Kouri; Jose Tapia Ramírez; José, Miguel (2005). "The bactericidal effect of silver nanoparticles". Nanotechnology. 16 (10): 2346–2353. doi:10.1088/0957-4484/16/10/059. PMID 20818017. Wikidata Q29615514.
- Katherine B Holt; Allen J Bard (2005). "Interaction of silver(I) ions with the respiratory chain of Escherichia coli: an electrochemical and scanning electrochemical microscopy study of the antimicrobial mechanism of micromolar Ag+". Biochemistry. 44 (39): 13214–13223. doi:10.1021/bi0508542. PMID 16185089. Wikidata Q46721295.
- Katherine B Holt (2007). "Diamond at the nanoscale: applications of diamond nanoparticles from cellular biomarkers to quantum computing". Philosophical Transactions of the Royal Society A. 365 (1861): 2845–2861. doi:10.1098/rsta.2007.0005. PMID 17855222. Wikidata Q36940365.

== Awards and honours ==
Holt was awarded the Edward Harrison Memorial Prize by the Royal Society of Chemistry (RSC) in 2007.
