= Andrew Orr-Ewing =

British chemist (born 1965)

Andrew Orr-Ewing FRS FRSC MAE CChem
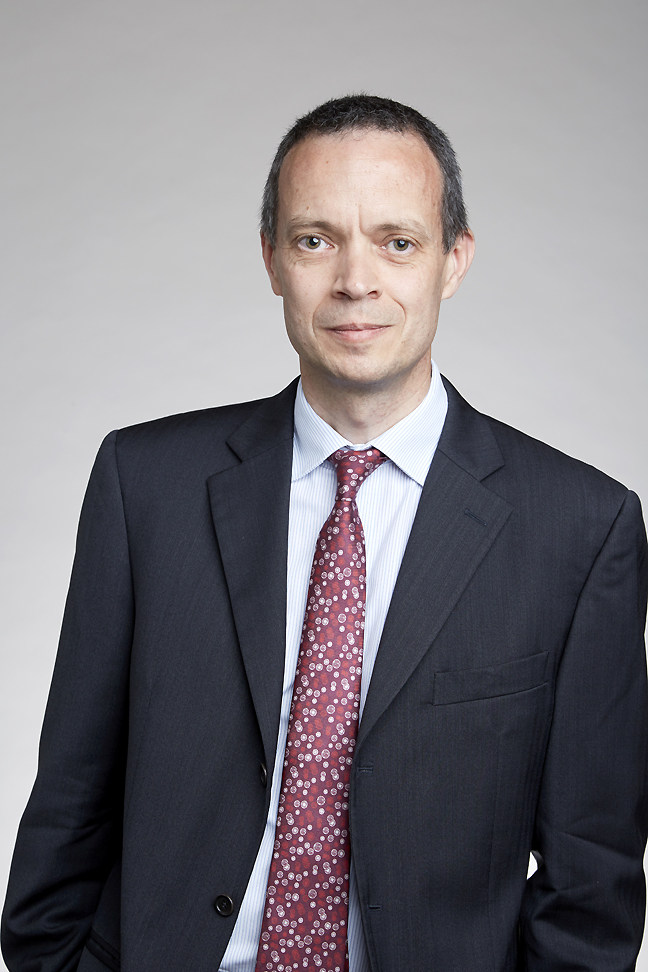
- Orr-Ewing in 2017
- Born: Andrew John Orr-Ewing; 1965 (age 60–61)
- Education: Dr Challoner's Grammar School
- Alma mater: University of Oxford (MA, DPhil)
- Awards: Edward Harrison Memorial Prize (1994); Marlow Medal (1999); Royal Society Wolfson Research Merit Award (2006); Tilden Prize (2009)
- Scientific career
- Fields: Physical chemistry Chemical physics
- Workplaces: University of Bristol; Stanford University
- Thesis: Laser studies of reaction dynamics (1991)
- Doctoral advisor: Gus Hancock
- Website: research-information.bristol.ac.uk/en/persons/andrew-j-orrewing(a369b2fa-96a0-41a9-a723-b1030aa7c296).html

Andrew John Orr-Ewing (born 1965) is a British chemist and Professor of physical chemistry at the University of Bristol. His work investigates the mechanisms of chemical reaction in both the gas and liquid phases and has used ultrafast laser spectroscopy to observe the effects of solvents on molecular reaction and the dynamics of photodissociation.

== Education ==
Orr-Ewing was educated at Dr Challoner's Grammar School and Jesus College, Oxford. He was awarded a Bachelor of Arts degree by the University of Oxford in 1988. In 1991 he was awarded a Doctor of Philosophy degree in physical chemistry for research supervised by Gus Hancock, also at the University of Oxford.

== Career and research ==
Following his DPhil, Orr-Ewing completed two years of post-doctoral research supervised by Richard Zare at Stanford University in California, and was then a Royal Society Elizabeth Challenor research fellow at the University of Bristol, where he was later appointed Professor of physical chemistry in August 2004. His research interests are in physical chemistry and chemical physics.

=== Awards and honours ===
Orr-Ewing has received awards from the Royal Society of Chemistry including the Edward Harrison Memorial Prize in 1994, the Marlow Medal in 1999, the Tilden Prize in 2009, the Faraday Lectureship Prize in 2026, and awards in optical spectroscopy in 2002 and chemical dynamics in 2014. He was a Leverhulme Trust senior research fellow in 2005, and received a Royal Society Wolfson Research Merit Award in 2006. He was elected a Fellow of the Royal Society in 2017 and a Member of the Academia Europaea (MAE) in 2018. In 2025, he was elected as a Foreign Fellow of the National Academy of Sciences, India, and in 2026 as an International Honorary Member of the American Academy of Arts and Sciences.
