= Iain McCulloch (academic) =

Chemist

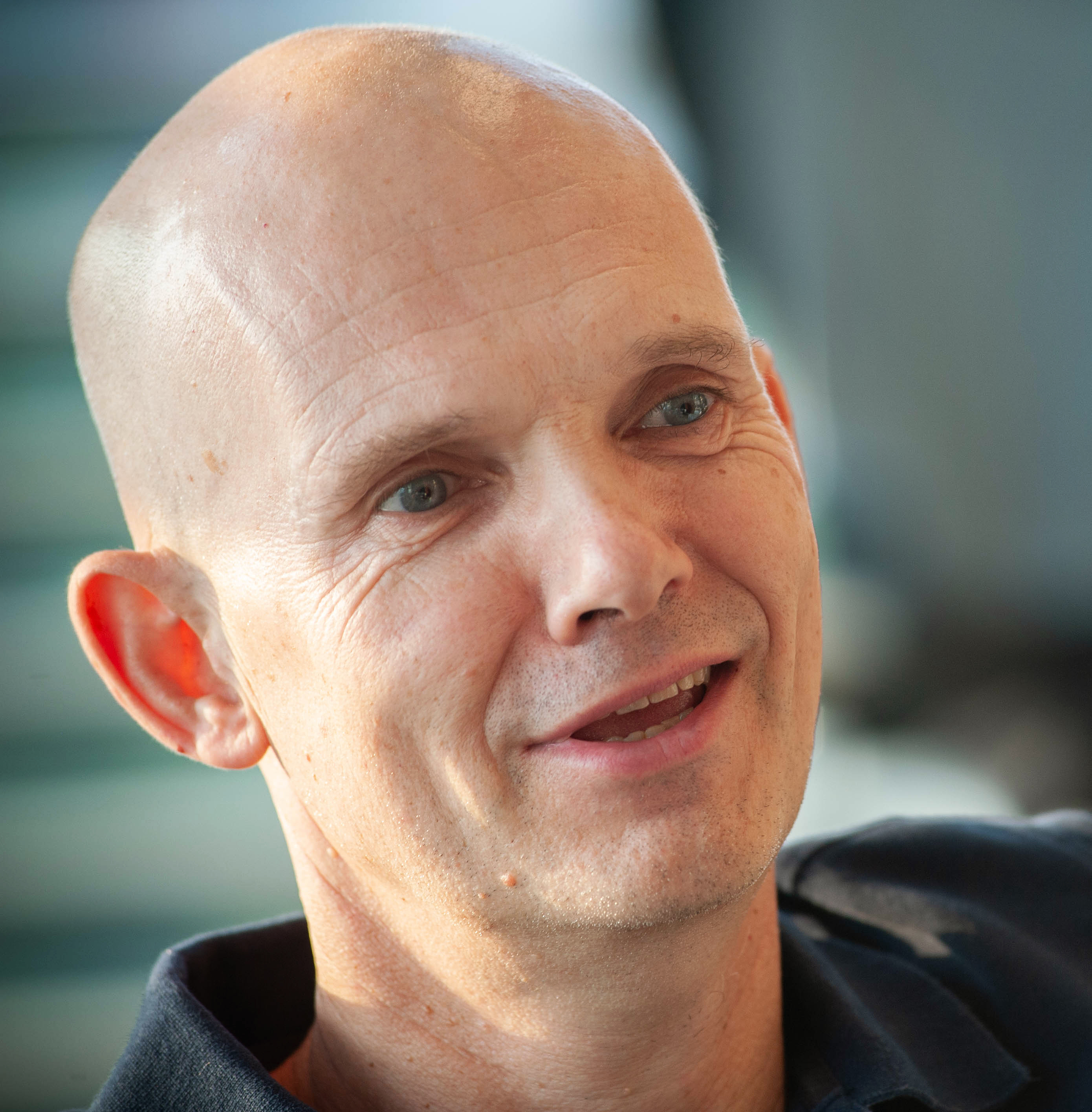
Iain McCulloch

Iain McCulloch is Professor of Polymer Chemistry, in the Department of Chemistry, at the University of Oxford, UK, a fellow and tutor in chemistry at Worcester College, and an adjunct professor at King Abdullah University of Science and Technology (KAUST), Saudi Arabia, and a visiting professor in the Department of Chemistry at Imperial College London.

== Education ==
McCulloch was born in Scotland. He studied chemistry at the University of Strathclyde. He obtained his Bachelor of Science with First Class Honors in 1986 and a Ph.D. in polymer chemistry in 1989.

== Research ==
McCulloch began his career after graduating with a PhD in polymer chemistry from University of Strathclyde, UK, at Hoechst Celanese Corporation in New Jersey, US, where he designed, developed and commercialized functional polymers for a range of optical, electronic, and drug-delivery applications including a water-based antireflective polymer system for photoresist processes with AZ Clariant.

He then moved to ISP Corporation, in New Jersey, US, to manage the polymer physics research group, working on developing methodology for rheological surface science and electronic products. In 2000, he returned to the UK, as a research manager at Merck Chemicals in Southampton, where he was responsible for developing semiconducting polymers for organic electronic and solar-cell applications. A key aspect of his research was the exploitation of molecular alignment and organization of semiconducting polymers and small molecules in the liquid crystalline phase.

At Merck, his group discovered a liquid crystalline thiophene polymer, pBTTT, which subsequently underpinned many research advances in charge transport of organic thin films since its publication in Nature Materials in 2006, which garnered the distinction of one of the top ten most influential papers published in the first five years of publication of the journal. In 2007, McCulloch joined the faculty at Imperial College to continue research in organic semiconductor materials.

At this time, along with colleague Professor Martin Heeney, cofounded the specialty chemical company, Flexink Ltd, where he is currently the managing director, which have been in operation for the last 12 years, supplying a range of electronic materials to leading manufacturers across the world.

At Imperial, he continued to explore new chemistries for organic solar cells and transistors, developing the polymer IDTBT, which exhibits disorder free transport, and an early non-fullerene electron acceptor for solar cells, IDTBR.

McCulloch joined KAUST in 2014, and became Director of the KAUST Solar Center in 2016. His work developing new solar cell materials led to the discovery that a ternary materials blend, with two non-fullerene acceptors, could outperform the equivalent binary devices, leading to high power conversion efficiencies, that helped towards a resurgence in the field. He continues to expand his application focus for polymer materials to perform at the interface between biology and electronics, demonstrating together with colleagues Jonathan Rivnay, George Malliaras and Sahika Inal, electron transport in an organic electrochemical transistor (OECT) operated in an aqueous electrolyte in ambient conditions. This discovery provided the impetus for a new class of polymer based electrochemical transistor sensors for biological applications and improve the sophistication of bioelectronic devices.

Further work with colleague Inal has led to their employment in the detection of lactate and glucose with potential societal impact in healthcare. More recently, his group have demonstrated the potential for hydrogen production, arising from photocatalysis of water using nanoparticle blends of organic semiconductors.

== Recognition ==
McCulloch's scientific achievements were recognised by the 2011 analysis of the “Top 100 Materials Scientists, 2000-10, Ranked by Citation Impact” where he was ranked at number 35 globally and number 2 in the UK

He is among the top 100 most cited chemists in the world, and is included in the list of the Highly Cited Researchers for materials science in 2014, 2015, 2016, 2017, 2018, Chemistry in 2017, 2018 and Crossfield in 2019, 2020.

Iain is a Fellow of the Royal Society, a Member of Academia Europaea, a Fellow of the European Academy of Sciences, a Fellow of the Royal Society of Chemistry and a member of the Advanced Materials (Wiley) Hall of Fame.

McCulloch has received the Royal Society of Chemistry 2020 Interdisciplinary Prize, the 2014 Tilden Prize, and the 2009 Creativity in Industry Prize. In 2020, he was also awarded the European Academy of Sciences Blaise Pascal Medal for Materials Science. He was also recognized with a Royal Society Wolfson Merit Award in 2014.

== Research ==
- 446 peer-reviewed papers, 66 patents filed, 1 book edited, 6 book chapters co-authored.
- Google Scholar h-index: 107. >48000 citations and >390 papers with at least 10 citations.

== Career ==
- Co-Founder and Director, Flexink Ltd (since 2007) a Specialty Chemicals Company.
- Co-founder of Solar Press, an organic solar cell start-up funded by the Carbon Trust (2009–2013).
- Partner in C-Change LLP (2008–2014), a technology consultancy partnership.

McCulloch is Associate Editor of Science Advances, a member of the International Advisory Board Member of Advanced Materials, an Advisory Board Member of (RSC) Journal of Materials Chemistry C and Materials Advances, an Editorial Advisory Board Member of Chemistry of Materials and an Associate Editor of Materials Science and Engineering R: Reports.
