= Sharon Ashbrook =

British professor of physical chemistry

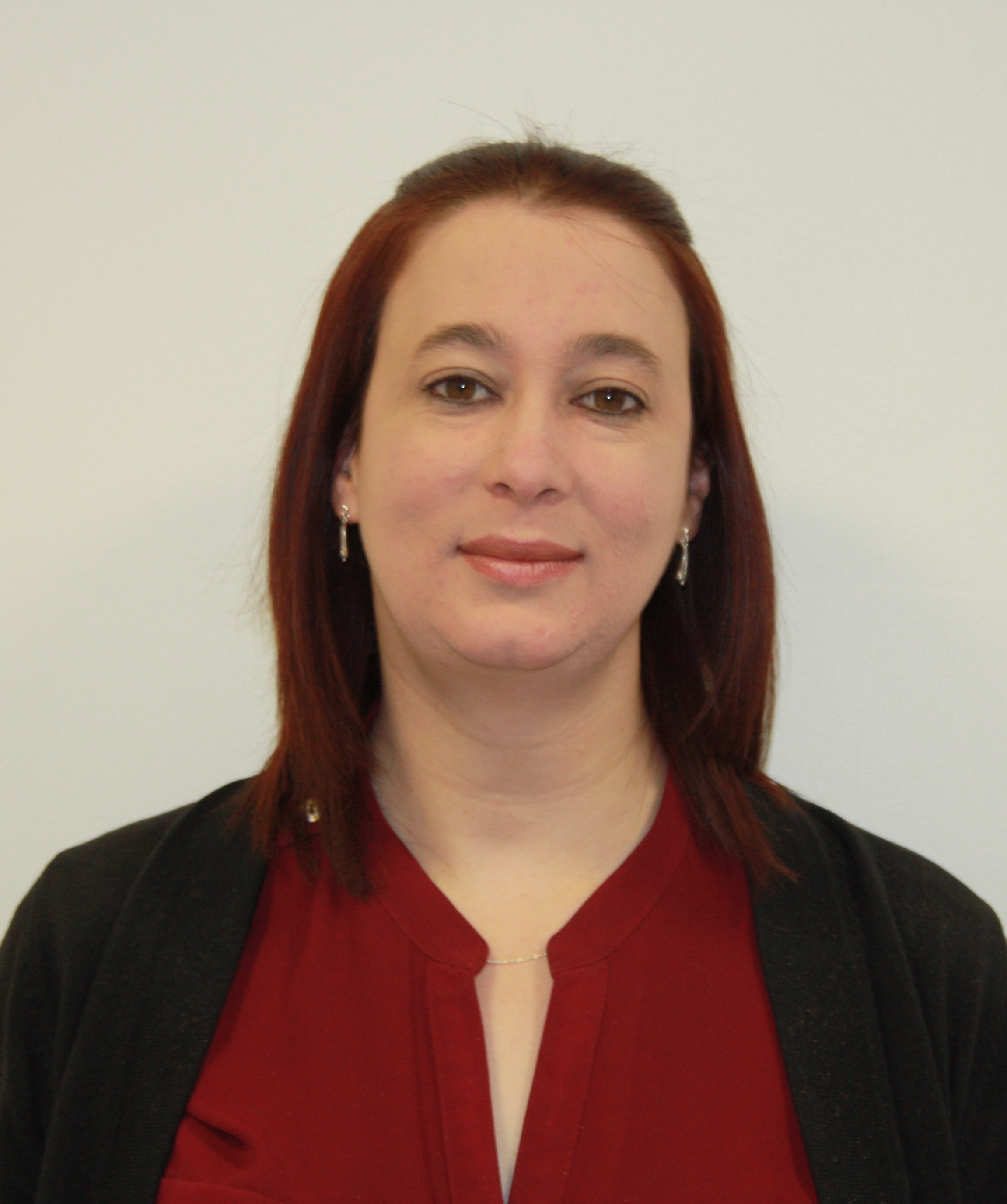
- Born: 26 January 1975 (age 51)
- Education: Hertford College; University of Exeter; University of Cambridge
- Awards: Dorothy Hodgkin Fellowship; Corday-Morgan Prize; Edward Harrison Memorial Prize; Suffrage Science Award (2017)
- Scientific career
- Fields: Chemistry
- Workplaces: University of St Andrews

Sharon Elizabeth Marie Ashbrook (born 26 January 1975) is a Professor of Physical Chemistry at the University of St Andrews. Her research is focused on the application of multinuclear solid-state NMR spectroscopy techniques as well as the combination of these techniques with first-principles calculations to investigate structure, order and dynamics of solid state materials.

Other areas of interest include microporous framework materials, high pressure minerals and the encapsulation of nuclear waste with ceramics.

== Education and career ==
Ashbrook studied Chemistry at Hertford College in Oxford in 1997 and then remained in Oxford to study for her DPhil. Ashbrook then moved to a postdoctoral research post at the University of Exeter. Later Ashbrook was then awarded a Royal Society Dorothy Hodgkin Fellowship at the University of Cambridge.

Ashbrook has published over 110 papers in the area of structure and disorder in the solid state, using NMR spectroscopy and DFT calculations.

== Honours and prizes ==
Her work has garnered awards and prizes for her research using solid-state NMR spectroscopy and first-principles calculations to uncover the structure of materials and their chemical reactivity.

- Faraday Division Mid-Career Bourke-Liversidge Award (2021) from the Royal Society of Chemistry.
- Corday-Morgan Prize (2015) from the Royal Society of Chemistry
- Makdougall Brisbane Medal (2012) from the Royal Society of Edinburgh
- Marlow Award (2011) from the Royal Society of Chemistry
- Harrison Prize (2004) from the Royal Society of Chemistry

In 2017, Ashbrook was awarded the Suffrage Science Award after her work on the "Academic Women Now" booklet about academic women in Scotland.

== Professional activities ==
Ashbrook was elected a Member of the RSE Young Academy of Scotland (2011), the Institute of Physics, the Mineralogical Society of Great Britain and the Ampere Board of Trustees (2016-2020). She is also a Fellow of the Royal Society of Edinburgh and the Royal Society of Chemistry. She also regularly organises outreach programs with local schools through her role as the Vice-Chair of the Tayside Local Section of the Royal Society of Chemistry and as a RSE Fellow.
