= Anthony P. Davis =

British supramolecular chemist

- Born: 27 August 1954 (age 72)
- Education: University of Oxford (BA 1977, DPhil 1979)
- Awards: Royal Medal 2025 Tilden Prize 2002
- Scientific career
- Fields: Supramolecular chemistry
- Workplaces: University of Bristol (2000-present); Trinity College Dublin (1982-2000)
- Thesis: Synthetic aspects of organosulphur chemistry (1979)
- Doctoral advisor: Gordon Whitham
- Website: https://davis.chm.bris.ac.uk/

Anthony P. Davis FRSC is a British chemist currently serving as Professor of Supramolecular Chemistry at the University of Bristol.

== Early life and education ==
Davis was born 27th August 1954. He enrolled at the University of Oxford in 1973, graduating with a BA in chemistry in 1977, and from 1977 to 1979 studied for a D. Phil under G.H. Whitham. His thesis was entitled Synthetic aspects of organosulphur chemistry.

== Career ==
After graduating, Davis worked as a postdoctoral researcher at Oxford under J.E. Baldwin from 1979 to 1981, when he left to take up a Royal Society European exchange Fellowship at ETH Zurich under Albert Eschenmoser. In 1982, he began work at Trinity College Dublin as a lecturer in organic chemistry, where he remained until 2000, and has worked at the University of Bristol since.

Davis serves as chair of the editorial board for the RSC journal Organic and Biomolecular Chemistry.

Davis has co-founded two startup companies to develop practical applications for his work: Zylo in 2014 and Carbometrics in 2018.

== Recognition ==
Davis received the 2002 Tilden Prize of the Royal Society of Chemistry and was the 2003 Abbott Laboratories Distinguished Lecturer. He received the RSC Robert Robinson Award in 2020 and the Royal Medal of the Royal Society in 2025 for designing artificial glucose receptor GluHUT to act as an in vitro glucose sensor and improve treatment of diabetes.
