= British Vacuum Council =

The British Vacuum Council (BVC) is the link between scientists and engineers within the UK and the International Union for Vacuum Science, Technique and Applications (IUVSTA).

The Council supports education activities that develop the understanding of vacuum science, technology and its applications. It is strongly engaged in coordinating, sponsoring and promoting conferences, meetings, seminars and courses in these fields.

The Council encourages professional excellence by awarding two prizes each year for outstanding work.

== About ==
The British Vacuum Council is a registered charity which represents internationally the interests of scientists and engineers who are members of professional and learned societies in fields related to vacuum. These societies can become members of the Council and are known as "institutional members". Currently, there are two members: the Institute of Physics and the UK Surface Analysis Forum.

The Members of the Council comprise Officers who are elected at the Annual Meeting of the Council and two representatives of each institutional member.

The BVC nominates a Councillor and an Alternate Councillor to represent Great Britain on the International Union for Vacuum Science, Technique and Applications for each of its Triennia. It also nominates representatives to each Divisional College of IUVSTA. The Councillor, Alternate and Divisional Representatives are non-voting members of Council.

The Council has no individual members or corporate members.

== Charity information ==
The British Vacuum Council is a charitable organisation having obtained its status in 1985. It is registered under UK Charity Number 292999.

The Trustees of the charity are the full members of the Council. The BVC submits an annual return to The Charity Commissioner of England and Wales each year.

== Inauguration of the British Vacuum Council ==
The British Vacuum Council (BVC), which came into existence in 1959 under its original name Joint British Committee for Vacuum Science and Technology (JBCVST), is the body which was established by a number of professional, scientific and technological institutions (Institute of Metals, Institution of Electrical Engineers, Institute of Physics, the Faraday Division of the Royal Society of Chemistry) to co-ordinate meetings and similar activities of members interested in vacuum in the several Institutions. It is moreover, the British national vacuum body affiliated to the IUVSTA and the official channel through which vacuum workers in the United Kingdom can collaborate with their colleagues overseas.

The need for a national body to serve the interests of the scientists and engineers engaged in expanding the field of vacuum science and technology in the UK became apparent in 1959. Because of the inter-disciplinary nature of the subject no single Professional Institution could be expected to give a complete service to all vacuum workers. Accordingly, discussions took place between representatives of nine Institutions culminating in a meeting in June 1959 at which it was agreed not to recommend the formation of a new autonomous vacuum society but, instead, to set up a joint committee composed of representatives of the participating Institutions. It was further agreed that the Institute of Physics would provide a permanent secretariat for the Committee, which would be paid for from a small annual subscription levied on each participating Institution. The JBCVST held its first meeting in October 1959 at which Dr. R. W. Sillars (representative of the Institute of Physics) was elected as the first Chairman with Dr. H. R. Lang (Secretary of the Institute of Physics) being appointed Secretary.

Further examination of the role of the JBCVST after several years' operation led to the conclusion that it should continue but with the formulation of a proper Constitution to regularize its existence. As part of this reform the title was changed on 10 April 1969 to The British Vacuum Council. On 18 November 1985, it was accepted by the UK Charity Commissioners, giving the BVC charitable status (Reg No: 292999). The original members of the BVC were: The Institute of Physics and the Physical Society, The Institution of Electrical Engineers, The Royal Society of Chemistry, The Institute of Metals, The Institute of Petroleum and The Institute of Chemical Engineers. Owing to changes in the member Institutes and their own members' interests, only the Institute of Physics now remains as a member of the BVC. The Institute of Metals withdrew in 1993 and the Faraday Division of the Royal Society of Chemistry withdrew in 2010.

== BVC and the International Union for Vacuum Science, Technique and Applications ==
The BVC is a founder member of IUVSTA and has been actively involved with the IUVSTA since its formation. The BVC hosted the 4th IUVSTA IVC in Manchester in 1968 and the 14th IVC in Birmingham in 1998 and also hosted 12 ECMs. Professor J. Yarwood helped draft the resolution establishing the IOVST which later became IUVSTA. He served as Councillor and was for many years Recording Secretary of the IUVSTA Executive Council. Mr. A. S. D. Barrett was Secretary General of the IOVST and IUVSTA Councillor. Professor L. Holland served as President of the Union during the period 1977-1980. Professor J. S. Colligon was Recording Secretary from 1986–1989 and Secretary General from 1989-1998. Professor D. P. Woodruff was Scientific Director from 1992–1995 and President from 1998-2001. Dr R. J. Reid has been Secretary General during the period 2004-2013.

Councillors have included Professors C. J. Todd, D. A. King, D. P. Woodruff, J. H. Leck and R. W. Joyner, Drs G. J. Davies, R. J. Reid, D. E. Sykes and A. Shard. The BVC is normally represented on all the Scientific Divisions of the IUVSTA and plays a full and active part in its work, including organising Conferences and Workshops.

== The BVC Annual Address ==
The BVC Annual Address was introduced in 1970 and is to be given annually by an outstanding worker in vacuum science or an allied subject. The first lecture was given by Professor L. Holland. In the early 1970s this annual lecture was presented at a special meeting held in London and hosted by one of the constituent bodies. Later, the format was changed so that the lecture was presented at several venues within the United Kingdom. More recently, it has been given at a suitable major national or international conference held in the UK.

== Editorial responsibility ==
In 1971 the Council, at the invitation of the Directors of Pergamon Press, took over editorial responsibility for the journal "Vacuum". The duties handed down included the appointment of the Editor and his editorial advisors. The council has been fortunate in its selection of editors. The first was Professor J. Yarwood from 1971 to 1980, who was followed on retirement by Professor J. S. Colligon (1981–1989) and, subsequently, Dr R. K. Fitch. All were extremely energetic in carrying out the general policy established by the council and in developing the International standing of the Journal. In 1995 Elsevier, who had taken over the publication of "Vacuum" from Pergamon, terminated this agreement and its associated royalties. During the period where royalties were received, the income had allowed the BVC to give financial support to postgraduate students in the UK to enable them to attend scientific meetings both at home and abroad.

== Short courses ==
The BVC has sponsored short courses on vacuum and related topics over the years, including a very successful training course on Vacuum Technology, run by Drs Chambers, Fitch and Halliday, which was first held in Glasgow in March 1986 and has since been repeated at various venues many times. It also sponsors conferences and workshops in the UK and Ireland relevant to the fields of interest of BVC/IUVSTA and will consider sponsoring IUVSTA workshops abroad where a main organiser is based in the UK.

== Prizes ==
The Council has two prizes within its gift, which are normally awarded annually.

To encourage the awareness of young scientists and engineers of the subject, the Council instituted in 1977 a prize to be presented each year to a young scientist or engineer working in a UK laboratory, adjudged to have presented the best scientific paper in that year. In 1981 the Council was pleased when Dr. C. R. Burch agreed to allow his name to be attached to the prize in recognition of his pioneering work in vacuum science particularly in developing Apiezon oils some 50 years earlier.

=== British Vacuum Council Senior Prize ===
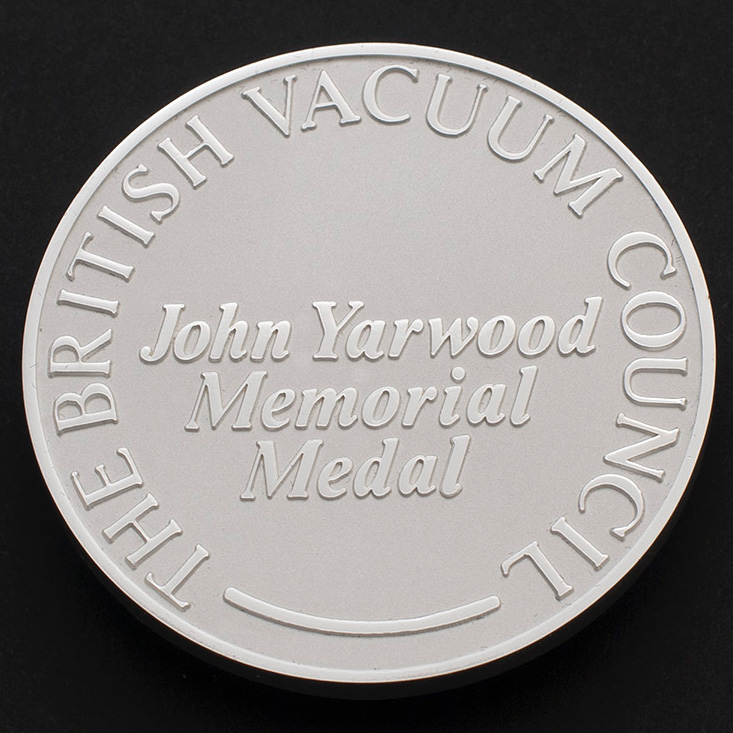
The medal awarded with the British Vacuum Council's Senior Prize

In 1988 the BVC Medal and Prize was first awarded for distinguished contributions to British scientific research in the fields of vacuum science, surface science, thin films or any related topic in which vacuum science and engineering play an important role. It was presented to Prof R H Williams at the 1st European Vacuum Conference held at Salford in April 1988, immediately before the Annual Address. It was also felt that the presenter of the Annual Address should also receive a medal. Consequently, the John Yarwood Medal was instituted for this purpose and was first presented in 1989 to Prof C T Campbell. The John Yarwood Memorial Medal has been established to honour the memory of Professor John Yarwood – a prominent scientist in the field of vacuum physics and one of the founders of the British Vacuum Council.

Currently the British Vacuum Council awards the Senior Prize, which is associated with the John Yarwood Memorial Medal. The prize is awarded for distinguished contributions to British scientific research in the fields of vacuum science, surface science, thin films or any related topic in which vacuum science and engineering play an important role. Prize winners may be invited to deliver the BVC Annual Address at an appropriate occasion.

=== British Vacuum Council Junior Prize ===
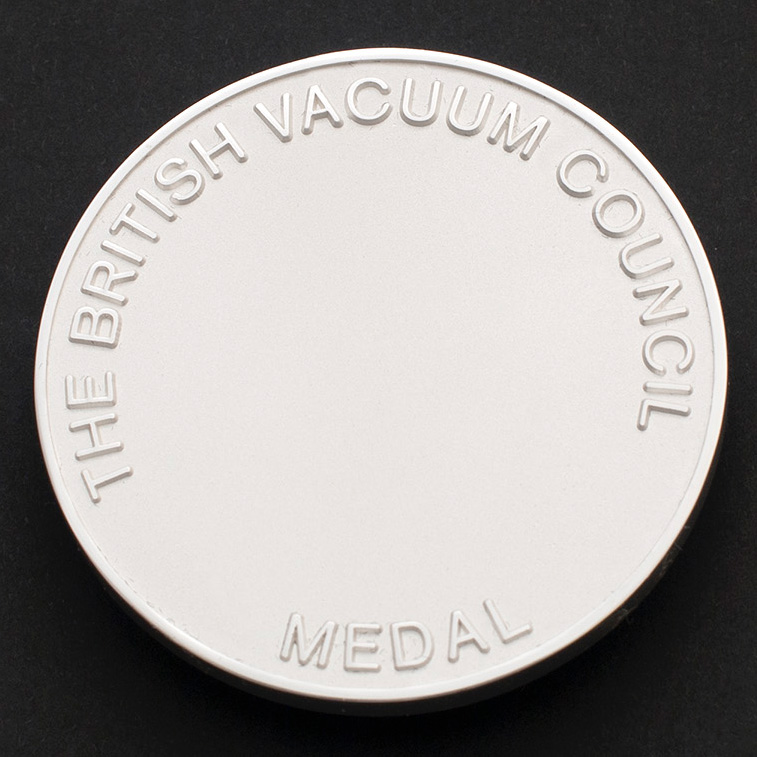
The medal awarded with the British Vacuum Council's Junior Prize

To encourage the awareness of young scientists and engineers of the subject of vacuum, the Council

instituted in 1977 a prize to be presented each year to a young scientist or engineer working in a UK laboratory, adjudged to have presented the best scientific paper in that year. In 1981 the Council was pleased when Dr. C. R. Burch agreed to allow his name to be attached to the prize in recognition of his pioneering work in vacuum science particularly in developing Apiezon oils some 50 years earlier.

Currently, the Council awards the C R Burch Prize and the BVC Medal to encourage outstanding work by scientists and engineers in the early stages of their careers in the field of vacuum science, surface science, thin films, or any related topic in which vacuum science and engineering play an important role. Applicants must be graduates within ten years of receiving their first degree or non-graduates at an equivalent stage of a professional career. Candidates should normally be resident in the United Kingdom or the Republic of Ireland

== Recipients of BVC prizes ==
=== Recipients of the BVC Senior Prize and John Yarwood Medal ===
2018	Dr William (Bill) Allison
2016	Professor Martin Castell
2014	Professor Geoffrey Thornton
2013	Professor Richard Palmer, University of Birmingham
2012	No prize awarded
2011	Professor Peter Weightman
2010	No prize awarded
2009	Professor John Watts
2008	Professor Chris McConville, University of Warwick

=== Recipients of the BVC Junior Prize and the BVC Medal and C R Burch Award ===
2014	No prize awarded
2013	Dr Philip King, St Andrews University, currently at Cornell University
2012	No prize awarded
2011	Dr Felicia Green, National Physical Laboratory, and Dr Peter Carrington, University of Lancaster
2010	No prize awarded
2009	Dr Timothy David Veal

The prizes were reconstituted in 2007.

=== Recipients of the BVC Medal and Prize ===
1999	M Wyn Roberts
1998	David Philip Woodruff
1997	John Henry Leck
1996	Neville Vincent Richardson
1995	Martin Pengton Seah
1994	John Brian Pendry
1993	Michael Hitchman
1992	John Pritchard
1991	David Anthony King
1990	Martin Prutton
1989	John Cecil Riviere
1988	Robin Hughes Williams

=== Previous winners of the John Yarwood Medal ===
2005	Professor Richard Lambert
2004	Professor Ian Boyd
2003	No prize awarded
2002	No prize awarded
2001	No prize awarded
2000	Professor Michael Bowker
1999	Professor M Wyn Roberts
1998	Professor D Philip Woodruff
1997	Dr Bo Persson
1996	Professor Alex Bradshaw
1995	Professor G Magaritondo
1994	Professor D Wayne Goodman
1993	Professor L Shohet and Dr D E Aspnes
1992	Dr John Haw
1991	Dr Bruce Kay and Dr F van der Veen
1990	Dr Joachim Roth
1989	Professor C T Campbell

=== Previous winners of the C R Burch Prize ===
Year	Name		Reason for winning (where recorded)
2008	No prize awarded		
2007	No prize awarded		
2006	No prize awarded		
2005	Dr Gavin Bell	University of Warwick	
2004	No prize awarded		
2003	No prize awarded		
2002	No prize awarded		
2001	No prize awarded		
2000	Dr Mike Lee	University of Hull	
1999	Dr Christopher Baddeley Dr Philip Moriaty	Lecturer in Surface Science, School of Chemistry, University of St Andrews School of Physics & Astronomy, University of Nottingham	
1998	No prize awarded		
1997	Dr Stephen Patrick Wilks	Dept of Electrical & Electronic Engineering, University of Wales, Swansea	Outstanding work in field of semiconductor interfaces
1996	No prize awarded		
1995	Dr Jas Pal Badyal	Dept of Chemistry, University of Durham	
1994	Dr Dermot Monaghan	Dept of Aeronautical and Mechanical Engineering, University of Salford	Development of new types of coating, and work in the field of physical vapour deposition
1993	Dr Robert Short	Dept of Engineering Materials, University of Sheffield	Work on polymer surface analysis and surface molecular engineering
1992	No prize awarded		
1991	No prize awarded		
1990	Dr T S Jones	Imperial College	
1989	Dr Karen Reeson Dr Alfred Cerezo	Dept of Electronic & Electrical Engineering at University of Surrey Dept of Metallurgy & Science of Materials at University of Oxford	
1988	Dr Elaine McCash	Cavendish Laboratory, Cambridge	
1987	No prize awarded		
1986	No prize awarded		
1985	No prize awarded		
1984	No prize awarded		
1983	Mr D C Peacock	University of York	Paper on 'Instrumental effects in quantitative Auger electron spectroscopy'
1982	No prize awarded		
1981	Mr David Kingham	Cavendish Laboratory, Cambridge	

=== Annual Address speakers ===
Year	Speaker	Topic (where recorded)
2005	Professor Richard Lambert, University of Cambridge	Application of Surface Science to Heterogeneous Catalysis
2004	Professor Ian Boyd, University College London	
2003	No annual address given	
2002	No annual address given	
2001	No annual address given	
2000	Professor Michael Bowker, University of Reading	
1999	Professor M Wyn Roberts, Cardiff University	
1998	Professor D Philip Woodruff, University of Warwick, UK	
1997	Dr Bo Persson	
1996	Professor Alex Bradshaw, Fritz-Haber-Institute, Berlin	Molecules on Metal Surfaces: Structure and Bonding
1995	Professor G Magaritondo, EPFL Lausanne	Photoelectron Spectromicroscopy with Ultra-bright Synchrotron Radiation
1994	Professor D Wayne Goodman, Texas A&M University	
1993	Professor L Shohet, Madison-Wisconsin Dr D E Aspnes, North Carolina State University	Recent Progress in Plasma-Aided Manufacturing Real-time Optical Diagnostics for Epitaxial Growth
1992	Dr John Haw, Texas A&M University	
1991	Dr Bruce Kay, Sandia Laboratories, New Mexico Dr F van der Veen, Philips Research Laboratories, Eindhoven	
1990	Dr Joachim Roth, Max Planck Institute of Plasma Physics, Garching	
1989	Professor C T Campbell, Indiana University	Studies of Catalytic Kinetics and Mechanisms Over Well-Defined Model Catalysts Based Upon Single Crystal Surfaces
1988	Professor T Madey, NBS Washington, DC	Electron and Photon Stimulated Desorption of Ions From Surfaces: Benefits and Pitfalls
1987	Professor R J Madix, Stanford University	Reaction Kinetics and Dynamics at Surfaces
1986	Dr H Biederman, Charles University, Prague	Polymer Films Prepared by Plasma Polymerization and Their Potential Application
1985	Dr R Tait, SERC Daresbury	Electrons, Photons and Ions at Daresbury
1984	Dr E Kay, IBM San Jose	The Role of Ion Laser-Induced Processing in Contemporary Dry Processing Techniques
1983	Dr A Luntz, IBM San Jose	Laser Probes of Molecular-Surface Dynamics
1982	Sir Alec Merrison, Vice-Chancellor, University of Bristol	Science and Technology: Is There a Difference?
1981	Dr J T Yates, NBS Washington, DC	Structural Factors in Chemisorption and Heterogeneous Catalysis
1980	R N Jackson, Philips Research Laboratories, Redhill	Television: the Widening Horizon
1979	Sir Arthur Vick, Vice-Chancellor, Queen's University of Belfast	Physics in Education
1978	Dr D Eckhardt, Culham Laboratory	The Vacuum System of the Proposed JET Experiment
1977	Professor G Carter, University of Salford	The Interaction Between Atomic Collisions in Solids and Vacuum
1976	Professor Boyd	Studies in Nature's Most Abundant Vacuum
1975	Dr E Jones, CERN, Geneva	The Design and Production of UHV Chambers, with particular reference to the CERN ISR
1974	No annual address given	
1973	Professor Tedford, University of Strathclyde	Vacuum Insulation in the Service of Industry
1972	No annual address given	
1971	Mr K C Barraclough, Firth Brown Ltd.	Vacuum Technology in Steel Making
1970	Dr L Holland, Edwards High Vacuum	A Review of Some Recent Vacuum Studies
