= David Phillips (police officer) =

British senior police officer

Sir John David Phillips QPM (born 22 April 1944) is a retired British senior police officer.

Educated at Leigh Grammar School and Manchester University (whence he graduated with a Bachelor of Arts degree), Phillips joined the Lancashire Constabulary in 1963, serving until 1984, when he became the Assistant Chief Constable of Greater Manchester Police. In 1989, he was appointed Deputy Chief Constable of Devon and Cornwall Police. He was promoted in 1993 to be Chief Constable of Kent Police, serving until 2003, when he was appointed Director of the National Centre for Policing Excellence. He retired in 2005. In the meantime, he had been President of the Association of Chief Police Officers (2001–03). Phillips received the Queen's Police Medal (QPM) in 1994; he was knighted in the 2000 Birthday Honours. He was also elected a Companion of the Chartered Management Institute in 2002 and holds an honorary Doctor of Laws degree from the University of Coventry, awarded in 2010.

== Honours ==
Ribbon	Honour	Year	Reference
	Knight Bachelor	2000	
	Queen's Police Medal		
