= Maurice Stacey =

British chemist

- Born: 8 April 1907; Moreton, Shropshire
- Died: 9 October 1994 (aged 87); Birmingham
- Education: University of Birmingham (BSc, PhD and DSc)
- Awards: Meldola Medal (1933)
- Scientific career
- Fields: Chemistry
- Workplaces: University of Birmingham; London School of Tropical Medicine

Maurice Stacey CBE FRS FRIC (8 April 1907 – 9 October 1994) was a British chemist who worked alongside Sir Norman Haworth to artificially synthesize Vitamin C.

Maurice Stacey was born on 8 April 1907 in Moreton, Shropshire. Stacey was educated at Adams Grammar School, Newport and graduated from Birmingham University with the degrees of BSc, PhD and DSc. Stacey began his career at Birmingham University as a demonstrator in chemistry in 1929. He was leader under Sir Norman Haworth of the Birmingham University team which synthesised Vitamin C in 1932. It was Stacey who personally isolated synthetic vitamin C. Stacey was Beit Memorial Fellow for Medical Research at the London School of Tropical Medicine from 1933 to 1937.

Stacey returned to Birmingham University in 1937 as lecturer in chemistry and then reader in biological chemistry. Stacey was professor of chemistry at Birmingham University from 1946 to 1956. He was Mason Professor and head of the Department of Chemistry at Birmingham from 1956 until his retirement in 1974. He was dean of Faculty of Science at Birmingham from 1963 to 1966.

Stacey's main research interest was in polysaccharides. He helped to develop bacterial polyglucose dextran as a blood plasma substitute.

Stacey was awarded the Meldola Medal of the Royal Institute of Chemistry (now the Royal Society of Chemistry) in 1933. He was elected a Fellow of the Royal Society in 1950. He was appointed a Commander of the Order of the British Empire in 1966 Stacy was vice-president of the Chemical Society (now the Royal Society of Chemistry) for the years 1950 to 1953, 1955 to 1958, 1960 to 1963, and 1968 to 1971. Stacey was awarded the Tilden Medal by the Chemical Society in 1944. He was awarded the Inaugural Haworth Medal in 1970. He was awarded the Centenary Medal by Birmingham University in 1975 and the Jubilee Memorial Medal by the Society of Chemical Industry in 1979. He received the Grand Award from the US National Academy of Sciences and the John Scott Medal by the City of Philadelphia. He was awarded honorary doctorates by Keele University, the University of Lima and the National University of San Marcos. Stacey died on 9 October 1994 in Birmingham.
