= Leslie Sutton =

English physical chemist

- Born: June 22, 1906; Isleworth, Middlesex
- Died: October 30, 1992 (aged 86); John Radcliffe Hospital
- Spouses: Catharine Virginia Stock (m. 1932; died 1962) Rachel Ann Long (m. 1963; died 1987)
- Awards: Edward Harrison Memorial Prize; Meldola Medal and Prize; Tilden Prize

Academic background
- Education: B.A., B.Sc, Lincoln College, Oxford; D.Phil, Magdalen College
- Academic advisor: Nevil Sidgwick

Academic work
- Institutions: California Institute of Technology
- Notable students: Leslie Orgel

Leslie Ernest Sutton FRS (22 June 1906—30 October 1992) was an English physical chemist. He was elected a Fellow of the Royal Society in 1950 for his "work on molecular structure, especially by the application of electric dipole moments, and interatomic distances measured by electron diffraction."

== Early life and education ==
Sutton was born on 22 June 1906 in Isleworth, Middlesex, to Edgar Sutton and Margaret Lilian Winifred Heard. As a youth, he received a Hertfordshire County Scholarship to attend Watford Grammar School for Boys, where he became interested in science and mathematics. He earned distinctions in Chemistry and Pure Mathematics and was encouraged to apply to the University of Oxford. While he was awarded a £60 scholarship at Lincoln College, Oxford, he failed his first responsions test in June 1924 and had to retake it in September.

Sutton graduated from Lincoln College with First-class honours in 1928 and started his doctoral research in quantum mechanics. He had originally wished to join Imperial Chemical Industries (ICI) but was encouraged to obtain a doctorate first. During his doctoral studies at Oxford, Sutton was mentored by Nevil Sidgwick, who collaborated in his early studies of thallium and arranged for him to spend six months in the laboratory of Peter Debye from 1928 to 1929. Sutton returned to Lincoln College in 1929 and began working alongside chemist Robert Robinson after confirming his theories of organic reactions. Robinson submitted Sutton's research to the Royal Society and supported his application for a research fellowship in Linus Pauling's laboratory at Caltech. Sutton's research began earning his recognition from the scientific community, and he received the 1932 Magdalen Fellowship and the 1933 Meldola Medal and Prize. As a fellow under Pauling from 1933 to 1934, Sutton also discovered how to measure molecular geometry in gaseous molecules by the novel technique of electron diffraction. Robinson noted that Sutton was "eagerly anticipating on his return to Oxford opportunity to stir us anthe and to introduce the new ideas and methods that he has acquired in Pauling's laboratory."

== Career ==
In 1936, Sutton was elected to replace Edward Hope as a Fellow and Tutor in chemistry at Magdalen College, Oxford. He also received the 1936 Edward Harrison Memorial Prize from the Chemical Society. In 1941, Sutton moved from the Dyson Perrins Laboratory for organic chemistry to the new Physical Chemistry Laboratory. Sutton was elected a Fellow of the Royal Society in 1950 for his "work on molecular structure, especially by the application of electric dipole moments, and interatomic distances measured by electron diffraction."

== Personal life and death ==
Sutton married Catharine Virginia Stock in 1932 and had three children with her. However, they were separated due to the Second World War, and she died in 1962. Sutton then married Rachel Ann Long in 1963, and they had two sons together before she died in 1987. Sutton died on 30 October 1992, at John Radcliffe Hospital.
