= James Barber (biochemist) =

British biochemist (1940–2020)

Jim Barber FRS FRSC MAE
- Born: 16 July 1940
- Died: 5 January 2020 (aged 79)
- Education: University College, Swansea; University of East Anglia
- Awards: Selby Fellow of the Australian Academy of Science (1995); Flintoff Medal (2002); Foreign Member of the Royal Swedish Academy of Sciences (2003); ENI award (2005); Novartis Prize (2006); Wheland Prize (2007); Royal Society of Chemistry Interdisciplinary Prize (2013); The Porter Medal (2016); Heatley Medal and Award (2020)
- Scientific career
- Fields: Biochemist
- Workplaces: Imperial College London; Polytechnic University of Turin; Nanyang Technological University
- Doctoral advisor: Jack Dainty
- Doctoral students: James Robert Durrant
- Website: www.imperial.ac.uk/people/j.barber

James Barber FRS FRSC MAE (16 July 1940 — 5 January 2020) was a British senior research investigator and emeritus Ernst Chain professor of biochemistry at Imperial College London, Visiting Professor at the Polytechnic University of Turin and Visiting Canon Professor to Nanyang Technological University (NTU) in Singapore.

== Education ==
He was educated at Portsmouth Southern Grammar School for Boys, University College, Swansea (BSc) and at the University of East Anglia (MSc, PhD).

== Research and career ==
Barber joined Imperial College in 1968, was made Reader in 1974, and was promoted to Full Professor in 1979. He was Dean of the Royal College of Science (1988-1989), and Head of the Biochemistry Department from 1989 to 1999.

Barber has published over 650 original research papers and reviews in the field of natural and artificial photosynthesis, editing 15 specialised books. The focus of his research has been the investigation of photosynthesis and the functional role of the photosystems with emphasis on their structures. Much of his work has focused on Photosystem II, a biological machine able to use light energy to split water into oxygen and reducing equivalents. In 2004, he reported the first fully refined X-ray structure of this enzyme. More recently, he has turned his attention from natural to artificial photosynthesis, collaborating with chemists, electrochemists and material scientists to develop artificial photosynthesis technology for solar fuel production. This work has been spurred by the establishment of the Solar Fuels Laboratory within the School of Material Sciences at NTU and of the Biosolar Laboratory within the Applied Science and Technology Department at the POLITO.

=== Honours and awards ===
Barber was elected a Fellow of the Royal Society of Chemistry (FRSC) in 1980 and a Member of the Academia Europaea (MAE) in 1989, became Selby Fellow of the Australian Academy of Science in 1995, Foreign Member of the Royal Swedish Academy of Sciences in 2003, and a Fellow of the Royal Society (FRS) in 2005.

He has received Honorary Doctorates from the University of Stockholm in 1992, the University of East Anglia in 2010 and Nanyang Technological University (NTU), Singapore in 2017.

He was awarded the Flintoff Medal by the Royal Society of Chemistry in 2002, the ENI award for Energy and the Environment in 2005, the Biochemical Society Novartis medal and prize in 2006, the Wheland Medal and Prize from the University of Chicago in 2007, the Royal Society of Chemistry (RSC) Interdisciplinary Medal and Prize in 2013, the Porter Medal, an international award for outstanding contributions to Photochemistry in 2016, and the Communication Award of the International Society for Photosynthesis Research also in 2016. In 2019 he received the 2020 Heatley Medal and Award from the Biochemical Society. He served as President of the International Society of Photosynthesis Research from 2007 to 2010.
