= James Bell (chemist) =

Northern Irish chemist (1825–1908)

- Born: 1825; Altnanaghan, Newtownhamilton, County Armagh
- Died: 31 March 1908 (aged 82–83)
- Occupation: chemist

James Bell (1825–1908) was a Northern Irish chemist, known for his work on analyses of food, tobacco and alcoholic drinks.

== Early life and family ==
Born at Altnanaghan, Newtownhamilton, County Armagh, he was educated privately and at University College London, where he studied chemistry under Alexander William Williamson. In 1858, Bell married Ellen Reece (died 1900), daughter of W. Reece of Chester. The couple had one son, (Sir) William James Bell, who became a Barrister and Alderman to the London County Council (1903–7).

== Career ==
In 1846, he became an assistant in the Inland Revenue Laboratory at Somerset House, established to carry out the provisions of the Tobacco Act 1842; and was successively deputy principal from 1867 to 1874, and principal from 1874 till his resignation in 1894.

The work of the laboratory was extended to alcoholic products; and when the Food and Drugs Act 1872 was amended in 1875, Bell was made chemical referee when disputed analyses of food were brought to court. Bell elaborated methods for analysing chemically foods within the operation of the Act. He was also consulting chemist to the Indian government, 1869 to 1894.

Bell's work was recognized in 1884 by his election as Fellow of the Royal Society, and he obtained the degree of Ph.D. from the University of Erlangen in 1882 and received the hon. D.Sc. from the Royal University of Ireland (1886). He was made C.B. in 1889. He was a member of the Playfair committee on British and foreign spirits, and served as president of the Institute of Chemistry from 1888 to 1891.

== Works ==
Bell's researches into grape and malt ferments were published in the Excise Officers' Manual (1865) and in the Journal of the Chemical Society in 1870. Many of his results were written up in The Analysis and Adulteration of Foods (3 pts. 1881–3; German translation, Berlin, 1882–5). He published also Chemistry of Tobacco (1887).

== Death ==
Bell died at Hove on 31 March 1908, and was buried at Ewell.

== Notes ==
Attribution

This article incorporates text from a publication now in the public domain: Lee, Sidney, ed. (1912). "Bell, James". Dictionary of National Biography (2nd supplement). Vol. 1. London: Smith, Elder & Co.
