= Wilson Baker =

British organic chemist

Wilson Baker FRS
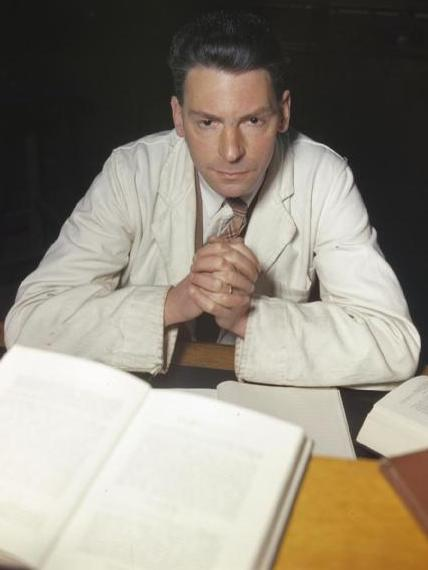
- Wilson Baker while at the Dyson Perrins Laboratory
- Born: 24 January 1900; Runcorn, England
- Died: 2 June 2002 (aged 102)
- Education: Victoria University of Manchester
- Spouse: Juliet Elizabeth Glaisyer
- Children: Rosalind, Roger and Katharine
- Awards: See text
- Scientific career
- Fields: Chelation, inclusion compounds, penicillin and other natural products
- Workplaces: Dyson Perrins Laboratory; University of Bristol
- Doctoral advisor: Sir Robert Robinson

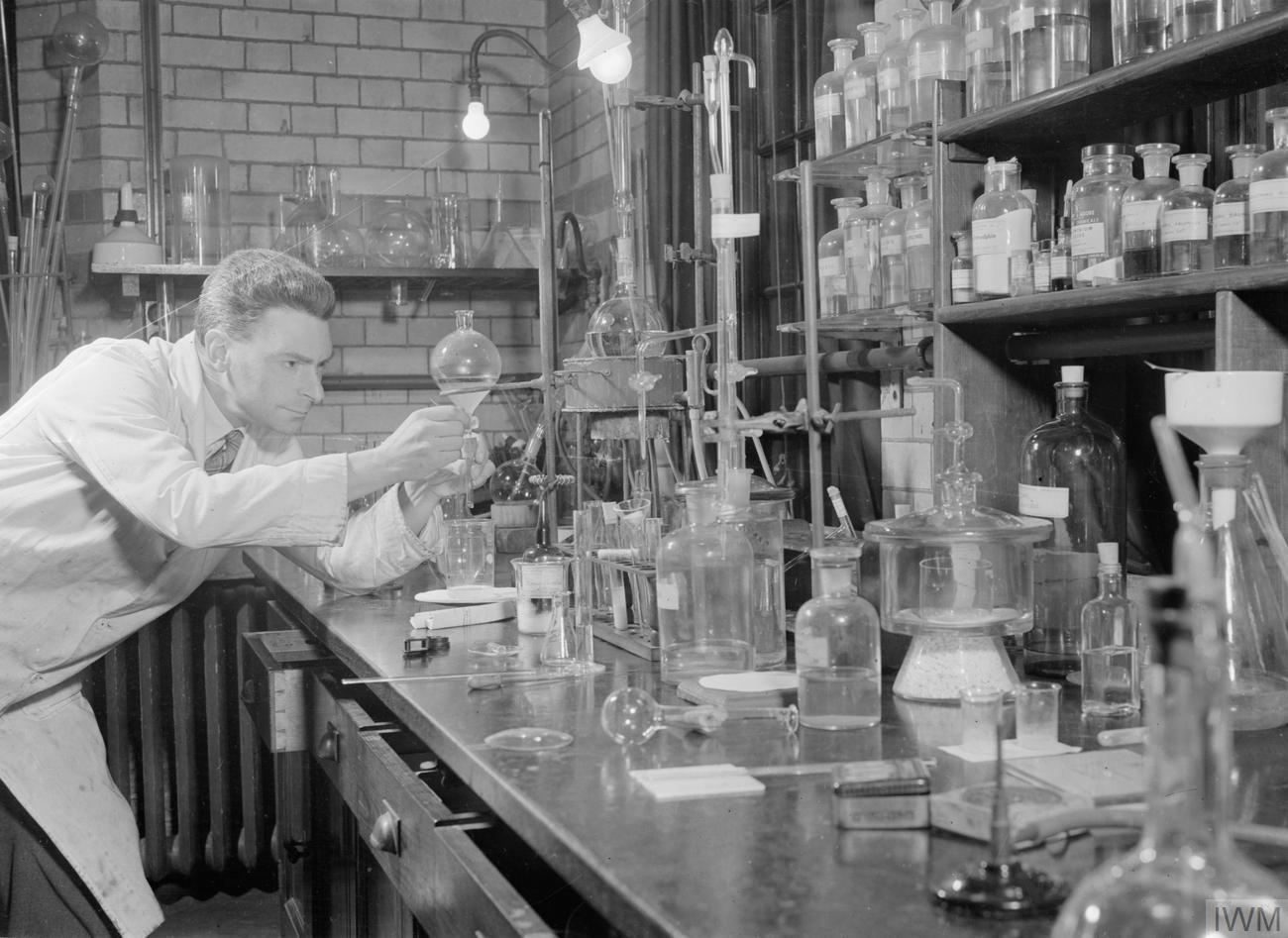
Baker in the Dyson Perrins Laboratory, 1944

Wilson Baker FRS (24 January 1900 – 3 June 2002) was a British organic chemist.

He was born in Runcorn, the youngest of the four children of Harry and Mary Baker (née Eccles); his father was himself a chemist, having studied under Sir Henry Enfield Roscoe and Robert Bunsen, amongst others. Wilson entered Victoria University of Manchester at the age of 16, and (having spent some time in France as a Quaker volunteer during the First World War) graduated top of the honours class in 1921. He then undertook an MSc. with Arthur Lapworth, before working on a PhD with Sir Robert Robinson on the synthesis of isoflavones. The degree was awarded in 1924, when he was also appointed assistant lecturer.

The following years in Oxford were important in Baker's career:

- In 1927 he was appointed by W.H. Perkin FRS as a Departmental Demonstrator at the Dyson Perrins Laboratory, and this became a University Lectureship and Demonstratorship in 1928 until 1944.
- Became a member of New College and was given the degree of MA by Decree of Congregation in November 1930.
- Awarded the degree of DSc Manchester in 1933.
- Appointed Fellow and Praelector in Chemistry at The Queen's College, Oxford, 1936–1944.

After 17 years in Oxford, Baker took up the post of Alfred Capper Pass Chair of Organic Chemistry at the University of Bristol in 1944, where he remained until his retirement in 1965. J.F.W. McOmie and W.D. Ollis (FRS 1972) were appointed as assistant lecturers in 1945 and 1946, respectively.

The war years had "left a legacy of impoverished equipment and laboratories in desperate need of maintenance" and, as a consequence, Baker's time was mainly occupied in building up the departments of chemistry, first in collaboration with Professor W.E. Garner and then with D.H. Everett. In his memory, a Wilson Baker Lecture is hosted by the chemistry department in Bristol every year.

Wilson Baker's research covered many areas, including chelation, inclusion compounds, penicillin and other natural products. His work is fully described in the Royal Society memoir.

== Family ==
Wilson Baker married Juliet Elizabeth Glaisyer, also a Quaker, on 4 August 1927 at the Sons' Meeting House, Huddersfield. They had three children: Rosalind, Roger and Katharine.

Wilson died aged 102 on 3 June 2002, outlived by the three children. Juliet had died in 1991.
