= Albert Ernest Alexander =

British-Australian chemist

- Born: 5 January 1914; Ringwood, Hampshire
- Died: 23 May 1970 (aged 56); Mosman
- Resting place: Pymble
- Education: Brockenhurst County School; University of Reading; King's College, Cambridge
- Spouses: Catherine Robson; Gisela Gudrum Baker (née Zutavern)
- Children: 2
- Awards: Tilden Prize (1946)
- Scientific career
- Fields: Colloid science
- Institutions: Institute of Medical Chemistry, Uppsala; Department of Colloid Science, Cambridge; Sydney Technical College university of Sydney
- Thesis: (1938)
- Doctoral advisor: Professor Eric Rideal

Albert Ernest Alexander (1914–1970) was a British-Australian chemist known for his pioneering work with colloids.

== Biography ==
Albert Ernest Alexander was born on 5 January 1914 in Ringwood, Hampshire, the sixth of seven children of William Albert Alexander, a master builder, and Beatrice (née Daw), formerly a teacher. He attended Brockenhurst County School, from where he gained a place in 1931 at the University of Reading. He graduated in 1934 with First Class Honours in Chemistry and an Open Scholarship to King's College, Cambridge. He was awarded a First Class in the Tripos Examination.

With the benefit of a King's College Senior Scholarship, a Department of Scientific and Industrial Research grant for research, and a Ramsay Memorial Fellowship, Alexander joined the Department of Colloid Science to work under Professor E K Rideal (later Sir Eric Keightley Rideal, MBE, FRS). He began with work on the orientation in films of long-chain esters and continued by examining porphyrins, chlorophylls and other molecules, with and without metals. Alexander was awarded his PhD in 1938, and then went hitch-hiking in Scandinavia with his friend from Cambridge F S Dainton. During their holiday they visited Theodor Svedberg's laboratory in Uppsala in August 1938, after which Alexander decided he would like to spend as much time as he could working with Torsten Teorell in Uppsala. He started at the Institute of Medical Chemistry in December 1938, but had to return to England at the outbreak of war in September 1939. His work in that nine-month period was published that year.

He returned to Cambridge, where he was elected a Fellow of King's College. In the Department of Colloid Science work continued on a wide range of topics including the role of hydrogen bonding in condensed monomolecular films and the effects of soaps and synthetic wetting agents on the biological activities of phenols. Fourteen publications appeared in the war years.

In 1944 Alexander became one of two Assistant Directors of Research in the Colloid Science Department; Gordon Sutherland was the other. On 6 February 1947 he delivered the Tilden Lecture in recognition of the prize he had been awarded by the Chemical Society of London.

In October 1947 the Société de Chimie Physique and the Faraday Society held a joint discussion meeting at Bordeaux on Surface Chemistry, at which Alexander and colleagues gave five papers. In 1949 Alexander and Johnson published Colloid Science which an anonymous reviewer praised as a broad, modern, and authoritative treatment of the subject of colloid physics and chemistry from the fundamental rather than from the phenomenological viewpoint.

In Australia, the government of New South Wales created an Institute of Technology as part of its plan to expand its technical education system at the tertiary level. They advertised for applications for a Chair in Applied Chemistry, to which Alexander was appointed. On 1 October 1949 he and his family sailed from London to Sydney on the RMS Maloja. They lived at 178 Raglan Street, Mosman, a suburb of Sydney, and only a short drive from the Sydney Technical College. During Alexander's seven years there he authored or co-authored some 40 papers. Many involved systems of practical importance, such as efforts to reduce evaporation from dams, and the cattle tick problem in NSW.

But, disillusioned with the lack of progress with the status of the Technical College to an autonomous university, Alexander moved to the University of Sydney in 1956. Work was quickly restarted on topics that may be catalogued under four headings: (a) monolayer studies, (b) micellar solutions, (c) the roles of surfactants in heterogeneous polymerisations, and (d) the effects of polyelectrolytes on the crystallisations of sparingly soluble salts. Fifty or more papers appeared from Alexander and his group. Their work is described in detail in Le Fèvre’s memoir.

== Personal life and character ==
Albert married Catherine Robson in Cambridge in 1940. They had two children: Naomi, born in 1944 and a son, William Neil, known as Neil. Naomi was killed in a car crash in the USA in 1966.

Catherine died of cancer 14 November 1963. Two years later, on 10 December 1965 Alexander married Gisela Gudrum Baker (née Zutavern, of Heidelberg), the widow of Kingsley Ferguson Baker, a Sydney industrial chemist, at the Presbyterian Church in Pymble. Stricken by a brain tumour in 1969 when serving as dean of science, he died at his Mosman home on 23 May 1970 and was cremated. His wife, and the son of his first marriage, survived him. The Pymble Church “was packed by friends, colleagues, and students on 26 May for a funeral service during which a moving panegyric was spoken by Professor I.G. Ross”.

One obituary summed up Alexander the man thus:

He took part in many campaigns, firmly, loudly, and fearlessly, yet always with his characteristic good temper...Alex was a cheery, outdoor character with a healthy outlook on life. […] Though not easy to get to know intimately, he was always friendly and smiling. He could be justly indignant, but he never lost his temper. Nor did he ever say or allow an unpleasant word about other people. No wonder he was a valued and popular colleague, firm, patient and gentle in his administration, and had innumerable friends. It was only when he found undesirable activities going on behind the scenes that his equanimity was disturbed; and then he spoke out strongly.
