= Michael Ashfold =

British chemist

Michael Norman Royston Ashfold FRS is a British chemist and Professor of Physical Chemistry at University of Bristol. He is a 2011 Royal Society Leverhulme Trust Senior Research Fellow.

He graduated BSc in 1975 and PhD in 1978 from Birmingham University.

His fields of research include ultraviolet photochemistry, optical diagnostic methods implemented on microwave-activated methane/hydrogen plasmas in the context of diamond growth via chemical vapour deposition, diamond thin film investigations and the study of nanostructured thin films.

== Awards ==
- 1989 Corday–Morgan Medal of the Royal Society of Chemistry
- 1996 Tilden Prize of the Royal Society of Chemistry
- 2009 Elected Fellow of the Royal Society
