= Bedford High School, Leigh =

School in Greater Manchester, England

Bedford High School

Location
- Manchester Road; Bedford, Leigh, Greater Manchester, WN7 2LU; England; 53°29′37″N 2°29′26″W

Information
- Type: Community school
- Motto: To care, to learn, to achieve
- Established: 1976
- Local authority: Wigan
- Department for Education URN: 106523 Tables
- Ofsted: Reports
- Headteacher: Paul McCaffery
- Staff: 150
- Gender: Coeducational
- Age: 11 (year 7) to 16 (year 11)
- Enrolment: 1,025 pupils

Bedford High School is a coeducational secondary school in the Bedford area of Leigh, Greater Manchester, England. It was previously two schools, Leigh Grammar School for boys and Manchester Road Secondary Modern School.

== History ==
Bedford High School was established in 1976 when the town's grammar schools were abolished by the 1976 Education Act. It was formed by merging Leigh Boys' Grammar School and neighbouring Manchester Road Secondary Modern School. The former grammar school buildings now form the upper school and the secondary modern buildings form the lower school. In 2003 the school gained specialist Business and Enterprise College status and opened a construction training facility in conjunction with the Construction Industry Training Board (CITB).

== Performance ==
In 2008, 37% of pupils achieved five GCSE passes at grade A* to C including Mathematics and English, while 75% achieved five A* to C grades overall. These results were a significant improvement over 2007, when 29% of pupils achieved five GCSE passes at grade A* to C including Mathematics and English, The school's Ofsted inspection in September 2004 stated that GCSE results were above that of similar schools. The same Ofsted report rated the school as satisfactory with effective leadership and praised the school's relationship with the local community. It also highlighted issues with year 9 performance, the provision of modern languages and personal development, and the attitudes and behaviour of a number of boys in the school.

== Notable former pupils ==
=== Leigh Grammar School ===
- Alan R. Battersby, organic chemist and academic
- George Henry Bolsover CBE, academic and director of the School of Slavonic and East European Studies
- Peter Maxwell Davies CBE, conductor and composer; Master of the Queen's Music from 2004
- David Evans CBE, microbiologist
- John Lennard-Jones KBE, mathematician and professor of theoretical physics
- Basil Lythgoe, organic chemist and academic
- David Phillips, Chief Constable, 1993–2003, Kent Police

=== Bedford High School ===
- Lisa Hession, murdered while a pupil at the school in 1984. Her sexually motivated murder, which occurred behind Rugby Road in Leigh, has not been solved
