= Dudley Williams (biochemist) =

British biochemist

Dudley Williams FRS
- Born: Dudley Howard Williams; 25 May 1937; Farsley, West Riding of Yorkshire, England
- Died: 3 November 2010 (aged 73); Cambridge, England
- Education: Pudsey Grammar School
- Alma mater: Leeds University (BSc, 1958 PhD, 1961)
- Spouse: Lorna Patricia Phyllis Bedford
- Children: 2
- Awards: See list
- Scientific career
- Fields: Chemistry; Organic Chemistry
- Institutions: Cambridge
- Doctoral advisor: Basil Lythgoe
- Other academic advisors: Carl Djerassi
- Doctoral students: Jeremy K M Sanders; Carol Bradley; Chris Hunter

Dudley Howard Williams FRS (25 May 1937 – 3 November 2010) was a British biochemist known for utilizing nuclear magnetic resonance (NMR) spectroscopy and mass spectrometry in the study of molecular structure, especially the antibiotic vancomycin.

== Biography ==
Dudley Howard Williams was born on 25 May 1937 in Farsley, Yorkshire, the only child of Lawrence Williams, an engineers chief order clerk, and Evelyn (née Hudson). He attended Pudsey Grammar School, from where he gained a place at the University of Leeds. He graduated in 1958 with a first-class BSc in Chemistry.

Williams' research for a PhD was on the synthesis of Vitamin D and related compounds, under the supervision of Basil Lythgoe, FRS at Leeds; his degree was awarded in 1961. That same year he was awarded a Fulbright Scholarship and moved to Stanford University to work with Carl Djerassi exploring the application of mass spectrometry (MS) in organic chemistry. He used the evenings to investigate the use of nuclear magnetic resonance (NMR) on a 100 MHz instrument with Norman Bhacca at nearby Varian Associates. "In three stunningly productive years, he showed how mass spectrometry and NMR … could transform the way that organic chemists worked. His textbooks, reviews, research papers and lectures revolutionised organic chemistry over the following years".

In December 1962 Djerassi gave Williams three months' leave to go back to England to marry Lorna Patricia Phyllis (always known as Pat) Bedford, whom he had met at Leeds. She was a secretary in the Chemistry department. They married on 9 March 1963 and travelled to California, which they enjoyed exploring in their leisure time.

The next move was to Cambridge in 1964, to take up a junior position in Organic Chemistry, at the invitation of Lord Todd. A condition of the move was that the department should buy a Varian 100 MHz NMR spectrometer and an AEI MS9 mass spectrometer. Williams stayed at Cambridge until his retirement in 2004.

In his memoir of Dudley Williams, Sanders noted that "the different areas of [his] science overlapped, intertwined and evolved so it is not easy to separate them out for discussion". He summarized Williams' work in three areas

- NMR and MS
A key contribution here was the use of shift reagents to alter NMR spectra to reveal more detail.
Conventional MS and then fast atom bombardment MS enabled Williams to sequence biologically active peptides, including gastrin and insulin.
- Determining the structures and modes of action of the vancomycin family of antibiotics
In 1969 Dudley took on the problem of determining the structure of vancomycin, a powerful natural antibiotic active against Gram-positive bacteria.
- Evolution
Williams "argued powerfully that 'natural products' such as the alkaloids found in many plant species that have no known function must have a vital but unknown role in order to justify the evolutionary effort and energy expenditure in maintaining their presence through many cycles of natural selection.

== Selected publications ==
- Williams, D.H.; Bhacca, N.S. (1965). "Solvent effects in NMR spectroscopy—III". Tetrahedron. 21 (8): 2021–2028. doi:10.1016/S0040-4020(01)98341-3. PMID 5879289.
- Williams, Dudley H. (1977). "A transition-state probe". Accounts of Chemical Research. 10 (8): 280–286. doi:10.1021/ar50116a002.
- Williams, Dudley H.; Bradley, Carol; Bojesen, Gustav; Santikarn, Sitthivet; Taylor, Lester C. E. (1981). "Fast atom bombardment mass spectrometry: A powerful technique for the study of polar molecules". Journal of the American Chemical Society. 103 (19): 5700–5704. Bibcode:1981JAChS.103.5700W. doi:10.1021/ja00409a013.
- Williams, Dudley H.; Bardsley, Ben (1999). "The Vancomycin Group of Antibiotics and the Fight against Resistant Bacteria". Angewandte Chemie International Edition. 38 (9): 1172–1193. doi:10.1002/(SICI)1521-3773(19990503)38:9<1172::AID-ANIE1172>3.0.CO;2-C. PMID 29711719.
- Fleming, Ian; Williams, Dudley (17 January 2020). Spectroscopic Methods in Organic Chemistry. Cham, Switzerland: Springer Nature. ISBN 978-3-030-18252-6.

A full bibliography is available.

== Awards and honours ==
- 1964 Fellow of Churchill College
- 1966 Meldola Medal, Royal Institute of Chemistry
- 1968 Corday–Morgan Medal, The Chemical Society
- 1983 Fellow of the Royal Society
- Tilden Medal, Royal Society of Chemistry
- 1984 Structural Chemistry Award, Royal Society of Chemistry
- 1990 Academia Europaea
- 1990 Bader Award, Royal Society of Chemistry
- 1996 Leo Friend Award, American Chemical Society

== Personal life ==
Dudley and Pat had two sons, Mark Howard in 1966 and Simon Bedford in 1968. Williams retired in 2004. Six years later he was diagnosed with an aggressive carcinoma of the liver. He died in a hospice in Cambridge on 3 November 2010.
