= Jean-Pierre Hansen =

Luxembourgish chemist (born 1942)

- Born: 10 May 1942 (age 84); Luxembourg
- Education: Paris-Sud 11 University
- Awards: Grand Prix de l'Etat (1990); Rumford Medal (2007)
- Scientific career
- Fields: Chemical Physics
- Workplaces: École normale supérieure de Lyon; Cornell University; Pierre and Marie Curie University; Institut Laue-Langevin; University of Oxford; University of Cambridge
- Doctoral advisor: Loup Verlet
- Doctoral students: Rosalind J. Allen Gilles Chabrier

Jean-Pierre Hansen FRS (born 10 May 1942) is a Luxembourgish chemist and an emeritus professor of the University of Cambridge.

== Education ==
Hansen gained a PhD from Paris-Sud 11 University in 1969, the same year working as a staff scientist for the French National Centre for Scientific Research.

== Career and research ==
In 1970, Hansen moved to the United States to do postdoctoral work at Cornell University before moving back to France in 1973 to work as an associate professor at Pierre and Marie Curie University. He became a full professor in 1977, and in 1980 moved to Grenoble to work as a visiting scientist at Institut Laue-Langevin.

In 1986 he became research director at École Normale Supérieure de Lyon, and in 1987 founded the physics laboratory there. In 1990 the French Academy of Sciences awarded him the Grand Prix de l'Etat for his work, and between 1994 and 1997 he worked as a visiting professor at the physical chemistry department of the University of Oxford; he moved Corpus Christi College at the University of Cambridge in 1997 and became Professor of Chemistry.

The Société Française de Physique awarded him their Prix Special in 1998, and in 2002 he was elected a Fellow of the Royal Society (FRS). The European Physical Society awarded him their first Liquid Matter Prize in 2005, and in 2006 the Royal Society awarded him the Rumford Medal.

In 2013, together with Herman Berendsen he was awarded the Berni J. Alder Prize by the Centre européen de calcul atomique et moléculaire.
