= Donald Holroyde Hey =

Welsh organic chemist (1904–1987)

Donald Holroyde Hey FRS
- Born: 12 September 1904; Swansea, Wales
- Died: 21 January 1987 (aged 82)
- Scientific career
- Awards: Tilden Prize (1951)
- Fields: Chemistry

Donald Holroyde Hey FRS (12 September 1904 – 21 January 1987) was a Welsh organic chemist. He was notable for his paper proposing that the decomposition of benzoyl peroxide gave rise to free phenyl radicals.

== Biography ==
Hey was born in Swansea, the son of Arthur and Frances Hey (née Baynham). Aged 11, he won a choral scholarship to Magdalen College School, and received his school certificate in 1920, before matriculating in January 1921.

After failing to achieve a scholarship to Oxford, and knowing that he could not afford the fees, Hey instead read chemistry at University College Swansea, entering in Autumn 1923 and graduating in 1926.

Elected to membership of the Manchester Literary and Philosophical Society on 1.1.1942 whilst researching in the Chemistry Department

A photographic portrait of him is in the National Portrait Gallery, London.
