= Darren J. Dixon =

British organic chemist and Professor of Chemistry at the University of Oxford

Darren J. Dixon (born 11 April 1971) is a British organic chemist and Professor of Chemistry at the University of Oxford. He has worked on asymmetric catalysis and bifunctional organocatalysts, including iminophosphorane superbases, used in the enantioselective synthesis of complex molecules.

== Early life and education ==
Dixon was born in Scarborough, North Yorkshire, in 1971. He studied chemistry at St Peter's College, Oxford, obtaining a first-class BA (Hons) in 1993, and completed a DPhil in organic chemistry at Oxford under the supervision of Stephen G. Davies.

== Career ==
Following post-doctoral research with Steven V. Ley at the University of Cambridge, Dixon held academic posts at Cambridge and the University of Manchester before joining Oxford in 2008 as Professor of Chemistry and Knowles-Williams Fellow in Organic Chemistry at Wadham College. From 2014 to 2022 he was Director of the EPSRC Centre for Doctoral Training in Synthesis for Biology and Medicine (SBM) at Oxford, responsible for coordinating industrial collaborations and doctoral training. He has served on editorial boards including Tetrahedron, Tetrahedron Letters, and the Beilstein Journal of Organic Chemistry, and sits on the Board of Directors of the Medicinal & Bioorganic Chemistry Foundation (MBCF).

== Research ==
Dixon's group designs bifunctional organocatalysts, especially iminophosphorane superbases, for enantioselective reactions and cooperative catalysis in carbon-carbon bond formation. His work has established catalytic desymmetrisation at phosphorus(V), nucleophilic additions to unactivated esters and amides, and reductive transformations of tertiary amides.

== Awards and honours ==
- 2026 Arthur C. Cope Distinguished Scholars Award (American Chemical Society)
- 2024 Charles Rees Award (Royal Society of Chemistry)
- 2023 RSC Tilden Prize (Royal Society of Chemistry)
- 2010 RSC Catalysis in Organic Chemistry Award

== Selected publications ==
1. J. C. Golec et al. "Catalytic enantioselective synthesis of alkylidenecyclopropanes." Nature, 2025 (in press). DOI: 10.1038/s41586-025-09485-y
2. Y. A. Almehmadi et al. "Iridium-catalysed synthesis of C,N,N-cyclic azomethine imines enables entry to unexplored nitrogen-rich 3D chemical space." Nature Synthesis, 2024, 3, 1168–1175. DOI: 10.1038/s44160-024-00574-w
3. M. Formica et al. "Second-generation catalytic enantioselective nucleophilic desymmetrisation at phosphorus(V)." Angew. Chem. Int. Ed., 2024, 63, e202400673. DOI: 10.1002/anie.202400673
4. G. Su et al. "Catalytic enantioselective intramolecular oxa-Michael reaction to α,β-unsaturated esters and amides." J. Am. Chem. Soc., 2023, 145, 12771–12782. DOI: 10.1021/jacs.3c03182
5. D. Rozsar et al. "Bifunctional iminophosphorane-catalysed enantioselective nitroalkane addition to unactivated α,β-unsaturated esters." Angew. Chem. Int. Ed., 2023, e202303391. DOI: 10.1002/anie.202303391
6. D. Matheau-Raven and D. J. Dixon "A one-pot synthesis-functionalisation strategy for streamlined access to 2,5-disubstituted 1,3,4-oxadiazoles from carboxylic acids." J. Org. Chem., 2022, 87, 12498–12505. DOI: 10.1021/acs.joc.2c01669
7. L.-G. Xie and D. J. Dixon "Iridium-catalysed reductive Ugi-type reactions of tertiary amides." Nature Communications, 2018, 9, 2841. DOI: 10.1038/s41467-018-05192-7
