= Charlotte Williams =

British chemist

Charlotte Williams OBE FRS
- Education: Imperial College London
- Scientific career
- Workplaces: University of Oxford University of Cambridge; University of Minnesota Imperial College London
- Doctoral advisor: Vernon C. Gibson

Charlotte Williams is a British scientist who holds the Professorship of Inorganic Chemistry at the University of Oxford. Her research focuses on the synthesis of novel catalysts with an expertise in organometallic chemistry and polymer materials chemistry.

== Early life and education ==
Williams studied chemistry at Imperial College London, graduating with a Bachelor's degree in chemistry. She completed a PhD with Vernon C. Gibson and Nick Long.

== Research and career ==
Williams joined the University of Cambridge as a postdoctoral research associate working with Andrew Bruce Holmes and Richard Friend. Here she focused on the synthesis of electroactive polymers. She then moved to the University of Minnesota, working in the group of Marc Hillymer and William Tollman on zinc catalysis.

In 2003 Williams was appointed to Imperial College London as a lecturer. She was appointed a Senior Lecturer in 2007, a Reader in 2009 and a Professor in 2012. Here she developed sugar-based biodegradable polymers that were produced from lignocellulosic biomass. During her time at Imperial she was an inventor of several granted patents.

She joined Trinity College, Oxford, in 2016. Her research focuses on metal complexes for use in homogeneous polymerisation catalysis. She identified catalysts that could use carbon dioxide as a raw material for polymers, which prompted Williams to start Econic Technologies. Econic Technologies has received more than £13 million in funding. She also identified transition metal complex catalysts, biorenewable polymers and liquid fuel production. She has developed switchable catalysts that allow the combination of monomers into block copolymers. Working with Milo Shaffer at Imperial College London, Williams uses nanoparticles in polymer composites. She is a member of the London Centre for Nanotechnology.

She appears regularly in the media, including on BBC Radio 4's In Our Time and at museums and festivals. In 2015 she won the WISE Campaign research award for her eco-plastics start-up.

In June 2024, Williams was appointed to the Professorship of Inorganic Chemistry, one of the five Statutory Professorships in Chemistry at the University of Oxford and took up a fellowship of St Catherine's College.

== Honours and awards ==
- 2021 Royal Society Elected fellow
- 2018 Gesellschaft Deutscher Chemiker Otto Roelen Medal
- 2017 UK Catalysis Hub Sir John Meurig Thomas Catalysis Medal
- 2016 Royal Society of Chemistry Corday-Morgan Prize
- 2015 WISE Campaign Research Award
- 2011 Bio-Environmental Polymer Society Outstanding Young Scientist Award
- 2009 Royal Society of Chemistry Energy, Environment and Sustainability Early Career Award
- 2005 Royal Society of Chemistry Meldola Medal and Prize
- 2001 Royal Society of Chemistry Laurie Verangno Award

Williams was appointed Officer of the Order of the British Empire (OBE) in the 2020 Birthday Honours for services to chemistry.
