= Charles Kemball =

Scottish chemist (1923–1998)

- Born: 27 March 1923; Edinburgh
- Died: 4 September 1998 (aged 75); Tyninghame
- Known for: Mass spectrometry; heterogeneous catalysis
- Spouse: Kathleen (Kay) Purvis Lynd
- Awards: FRS CBE
- Scientific career
- Workplaces: Cambridge University; Princeton University; Queen's University Belfast; University of Edinburgh

Charles Kemball CBE PRSE FRS FRSC FRIC (27 March 1923, in Edinburgh – 4 September 1998, in Tyninghame) was a Scottish chemist who served as president of the Royal Society of Edinburgh (1988–91) and as president of the Royal Institute of Chemistry (1974-6). He pioneered the use of mass spectrometry. and was a leading expert in heterogeneous catalysis.

== Life ==
He was born in Edinburgh on 27 March 1923 the son of Charles Henry Kemball FRSE (1889-1964), a dental surgeon, and his wife, Janet White. He was educated at Edinburgh Academy 1929 to 1940. In December 1939 he was awarded a scholarship to Trinity College, Cambridge where he graduated MA before gaining two doctorates (ScD and PhD).

On 16 October 1946 Kemball sailed on the Queen Elizabeth from Southampton to New York. This was the first voyage of the newly converted liner after her serving as a troop ship during WWII. Kemball was the recipient of a Commonwealth Fund Scholarship, on his way to Princeton, to work with Professor H S Taylor, a leading expert on heterogeneous catalysis. Princeton was at the forefront of research on catalysis, and "the 'Princeton experience' was the key to the distinguished career that Charles was to have in the field of heterogeneous catalysis".

Kemball sailed on the same ship back to England in September 1947, and joined the Department of Colloid Science at Cambridge to take up his Research Fellowship at Trinity. In the summer of 1949 Kemball moved to the Department of Physical Chemistry. Having reassembled his newly introduced mass spectrometer system, he started on an extensive period of research on the exchange reactions of hydrocarbons with deuterium by using evaporated metal films as catalysts; this was a significant a development of his work with Taylor at Princeton.

In 1951 he was a recipient of the Meldola Medal from the Chemical Society, which is awarded to the most promising British chemist under the age of 32.

He was Professor of Physical & Inorganic Chemistry at Queen's University Belfast (1954–66) and Professor of Chemistry at the University of Edinburgh (1966–87).

He was elected a Fellow of the Royal Society of London in 1965 and a Fellow of the Royal Society of Edinburgh in 1967. His proposers for the latter were Sir Edmund Hirst, Neil Campbell, Duncan Taylor and James Pickering Kendall. He twice served as vice president to the Society: 1971 to 1974 and 1982 to 1985. He served as President 1988 to 1991. He won the Society's Gunning Victoria Jubilee Prize 1976–1980.

Kemball received an Honorary Doctorate from Heriot-Watt University in 1980. He was appointed CBE in the 1991 New Year Honours.

He died at home in Tyninghame in East Lothian on 4 September 1998.

== Appointments, awards and honours ==
Kemball has earned the following awards and honours:

- 1946 Commonwealth Fund Fellowship to Princeton University
- 1946 Research Fellowship, Trinity College, Cambridge
- 1951 Meldola Medal, the Chemical Society
- 1958 Corday–Morgan Medal and Prize, the Chemical Society
- 1960 Tilden Lectureship, the Chemical Society
- 1962 Ipatieff Prize, the American Chemical Society [first award to a person outside the USA]
- 1964 Member of the Royal Irish Academy
- 1965 Fellow of the Royal Society (FRS)
- 1967 Fellow of the Royal Society of Edinburgh (FRSE
- 1972 Colloid and Surface Chemistry Award, the Chemical Society
- 1974–76 President, the Royal Institute of Chemistry
- 1976–77 President, Section B (Chemistry), the British Association
- 1976–80 President, International Congress of Catalysis
- 1980 DSc, honoris causa, Heriot-Watt University
- 1982 Gunning Victoria Jubilee Prize, The Royal Society of Edinburgh
- 1983 DSc, honoris causa, The Queen’s University of Belfast
- 1986 Award for Services to the Royal Society of Chemistry
- 1988–90 Leverhulme Emeritus Fellowship
- 1988–91 President, the Royal Society of Edinburgh
- 1991 Commander of the British Empire (CBE)

== Family ==
In 1956 he married Kathleen (Kay) Purvis Lynd. They had one son, Alan Kemball, and two daughters, Mary and Heather. Each of his three children had three children and he was survived by nine grandchildren.
