= Claire J. Carmalt =

British chemist

Claire Jane Carmalt
- Education: Newcastle University
- Scientific career
- Workplaces: University of Texas at Austin; University College London
- Thesis: Synthetic and structural studies involving the heavier elements of Groups 13 and 15 (1995)

Claire Jane Carmalt is a British chemist who is a Professor of Inorganic Chemistry and Head of the Department of Chemistry at University College London. Her research considers the synthesis of molecular precursors and the development of thin film deposition techniques.

== Early life and education ==
Carmalt studied chemistry at Newcastle University. She graduated with first class honours in 1992 before starting her doctoral research with Nick Norman. Her research considered the heavy elements of the Boron group and Pnictogen group. After earning her doctorate she spent two years as a postdoc at the University of Texas at Austin where she worked alongside Alan Cowley. She focussed on the design and synthesis of precursors to allow thin film growth.

== Research and career ==
Carmalt was made a Royal Society Dorothy Hodgkin Research Fellow at University College London in 1997. She has held many positions at UCL, including lecturer, professor, vice dean and eventually Head of Department. When she was made Head of Department in 2016 she was the first woman to hold the position.

Carmalt specialises in the synthesis of highly volatile, non-toxic molecular precursors for the growth of thin films of transparent conducting oxides (TCOs). TCOs are used in a range of different technologies, including computers, mobile phones and photovoltaic devices. The materials most commonly used to make TCOs (indium and tin) are available in limited quantities, expensive and complicated to process. Carmalt is interested in thin film deposition techniques, including chemical vapour deposition, aerosol-assisted chemical vapour deposition (AACVD) and atomic layer deposition. In particular, AACVD offers the potential for large-area TCO coatings based on nanoparticle dispersions.

== Awards and honours ==
- 2000 Royal Society of Chemistry Meldola Medal and Prize
- 2018 Ramsay Trustee of the Society of Chemical Industry
- 2019 Royal Society of Chemistry Applied Inorganic Chemistry Award

== Selected publications ==
- Lu, Y.; Sathasivam, S.; Song, J.; Crick, C. R.; Carmalt, C. J.; Parkin, I. P. (2015-03-05). "Robust self-cleaning surfaces that function when exposed to either air or oil". Science. 347 (6226): 1132–1135. Bibcode:2015Sci...347.1132L. doi:10.1126/science.aaa0946. ISSN 0036-8075. PMID 25745169. S2CID 32814057.
- Marchand, Peter; Hassan, Iman A.; Parkin, Ivan P.; Carmalt, Claire J. (2013). "Aerosol-assisted delivery of precursors for chemical vapour deposition: expanding the scope of CVD for materials fabrication". Dalton Transactions. 42 (26): 9406–22. doi:10.1039/c3dt50607j. ISSN 1477-9226. PMID 23629474.
- Song, Jinlong; Huang, Shuai; Lu, Yao; Bu, Xiangwei; Mates, Joseph E.; Ghosh, Aritra; Ganguly, Ranjan; Carmalt, Claire J.; Parkin, Ivan P.; Xu, Wenji; Megaridis, Constantine M. (2014-11-05). "Self-Driven One-Step Oil Removal from Oil Spill on Water via Selective-Wettability Steel Mesh". ACS Applied Materials & Interfaces. 6 (22): 19858–19865. doi:10.1021/am505254j. ISSN 1944-8244. PMID 25329492.

== Personal life ==
Carmalt has two daughters.
