= Rosalind J. Allen =

Soft matter physicist

Rosalind Allen
- Born: Rosalind Jane Allen
- Education: University of Cambridge (BA, MSci, PhD); University of Pennsylvania (MS)
- Awards: Royal Society University Research Fellowship (2009); Meldola Medal and Prize (2005)
- Scientific career
- Fields: Biophysics
- Institutions: University of Edinburgh; AMOLF
- Thesis: Electrostatic interactions in confined geometries (2003)
- Doctoral advisor: Jean-Pierre Hansen
- Website: www2.ph.ed.ac.uk/~rallen2/

Rosalind Jane Allen is a soft matter physicist and Professor of Theoretical Microbial Ecology at the Biological Physics at the Friedrich-Schiller University of Jena, Germany, and (part-time) Professor of Biological Physics at the University of Edinburgh, Scotland She is a member of the centre for synthetic biology and systems biology where her research investigates the organisation of microbe populations.

== Education ==
Allen studied the Natural Sciences Tripos at the University of Cambridge, graduating with a Bachelor of Arts (BA) and Master of Science (MSci) degrees in 1999. She was an undergraduate student at Emmanuel College, Cambridge. She moved to America for further postgraduate study, earning another master's degree (MS) in chemistry at the University of Pennsylvania. She returned to Cambridge for her doctoral studies, earning a PhD in 2003 for research supervised by Jean-Pierre Hansen on theoretical chemistry and computational simulations of water permeation of nanopores.

== Career and research ==
Allen joined AMOLF as a Marie Curie Fellow, working on models of switching events between metastable states, which are rare. She was part of the group who developed Forward Flux Sampling, which simulates rare equilibrium and non-equilibrium systems and allows the calculation of rate constants.

She joined the University of Edinburgh as a Royal Society of Edinburgh (RSE) Research Fellow in 2006. Allen is interested in organisms such as bacteria grow in complicated environments. She was awarded a Royal Society University Research Fellowship in 2009, studying the non-equilibrium interactions of microbes with their environments. She joined the Royal Society of Edinburgh (RSE) Young Academy of Scotland in 2012 and was promoted to Reader in 2013.

She has studied how microbes are involved with the sulphur cycle, which releases significant amounts of carbon as microbes consume hydrogen from organic matter. She analyses microbial ecology and nutrient cycles using Winogradsky columns, developing models that predict long-term microbial dynamics and chemical composition. She studies how microbial populations develop on different surfaces, identifying what factors influence the structure. Bacterial colonies self-assemble on soft gel surfaces, and Allen has modelled how they compete for space. Allen uses algorithms to study the metabolic pathways of sugars. She delivered the 2017 SCI: where science meets business Sir Eric Rideal Lecture. Her work has been supported by the United States Army Research Laboratory.

Allen delivered her inaugural lecture in 2018, discussing how physicists can contribute to antimicrobial resistance. Her research into antimicrobial resistance considers how antibiotic drugs interact with the physiology of a cell. She has also looked at how microbes evolve in drug gradients; finding that drug resistance is accelerated by the presence of a gradient. This occurs because bacteria enter the gradient in waves, with each more resistant than the one that proceeded it. Resistant mutant bacteria at the edges of the population wave exist at low density and do not compete with nearby cells. Allen published a statistical physics guide to bacterial growth in 2018.

=== Awards and honours ===
In 2005 Allen was awarded the Royal Society of Chemistry (RSC) Meldola Medal and Prize. She was awarded a Royal Society University Research Fellowship (URF) in 2009.

== Personal life ==
Allen is married with two daughters.
