= Jas Pal Badyal =

British academic

Jas Pal Badyal FRS
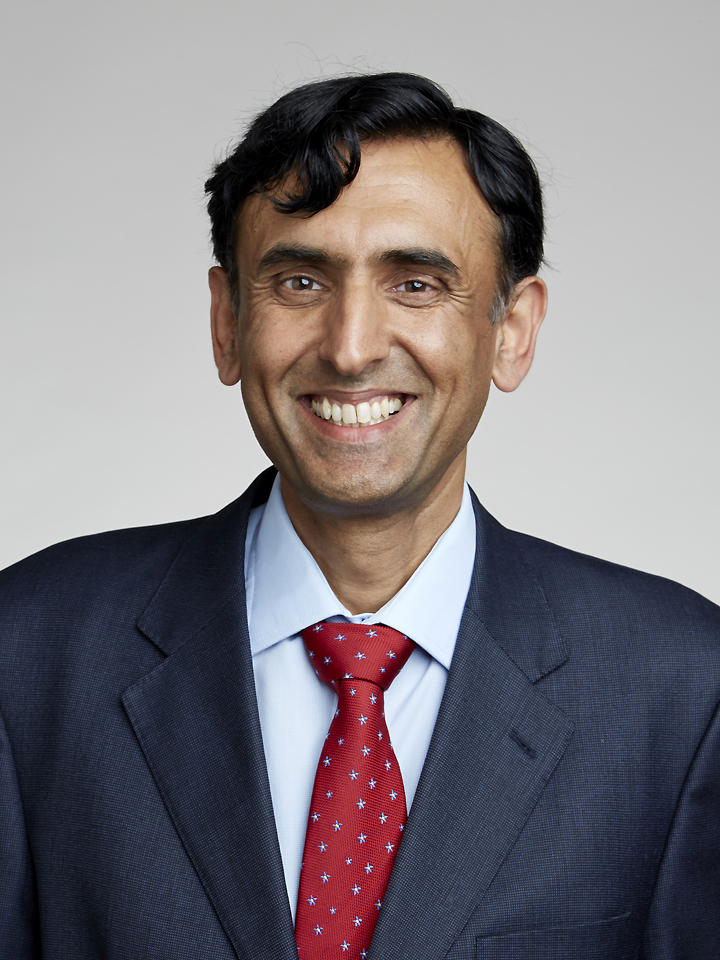
- Badyal in 2016
- Born: March 1964 (age 62); Staffordshire, England, UK
- Education: University of Cambridge
- Awards: Royal Society of Chemistry; Edward Harrison Memorial Prize (1993); Fellow of the Royal Society, FRS (2016)
- Scientific career
- Fields: Chemistry; Surface science; Biomimetics; Heterogeneous catalysis; Water harvesting
- Workplaces: University of Cambridge; Durham University
- Thesis: Structure, chemistry and catalysis at the ruthenium-titania interface (1988)
- Doctoral advisor: Professor Richard Lambert
- Website: community.dur.ac.uk/jps.badyal; www.dur.ac.uk/chemistry/staff/profile/?id=170

Jas Pal Singh Badyal FRS (born 1964) is a professor in the Department of Chemistry at Durham University. He has been Chief Scientific Adviser for Wales in the Welsh Government since February 2023.

== Education ==
Badyal was educated at the University of Cambridge where he was awarded a Bachelor of Arts degree in Natural Sciences in 1985 followed by a PhD in 1988 on the surface science of ruthenium-titania heterogeneous catalysts.

== Career and research ==
Following his PhD, Badyal held a King's College, Cambridge research fellowship and the Cambridge University Oppenheimer Research Fellowship. He was appointed a Lecturer at Durham University in 1989 and was promoted to Full Professor in 1996 where he has worked since.

Badyal is internationally recognised for his pioneering research on the functionalisation of solid surfaces and deposition of functional nanolayers. Badyal has invented a wide range of novel surfaces for technological and societal applications. These have been underpinned by the investigation of fundamental mechanisms and scale-up. Examples include: antibacterial, fog harvesting, catalysis, non-fouling, optochiral switches, filtration, biochips, super-repellency, and nano-actuation.

== Awards and honours ==
Badyal was elected a Fellow of the Royal Society (FRS) in 2016. He was awarded the Royal Society of Chemistry Edward Harrison Memorial Prize in 1993 and Tilden Medal in 2017. In 1995, he received the C R Burch Prize, awarded by the British Vacuum Council.

== Chief Scientific Adviser for Wales ==
He has been Chief Scientific Adviser for Wales in the Welsh Government since February 2023.
