= Niyazi Serdar Sarıçiftçi =

Turkish physicist

Niyazi Serdar Sarıçiftçi (born 1961 in Konya, Turkey) is a Turkish-Austrian physicist. He is a professor of physical chemistry at the Johannes Kepler University (JKU) Linz. There, he leads the Institut for Physical Chemistry as well as the Institut for Organic Solar Cells (LIOS).

== Life ==
Niyazi Serdar Sarıçiftçi graduated from the Austrian St. George's College in Istanbul. He also studied classical piano at the Music Conservatory in Istanbul (1970–1980).

Then he began studying physics at the University of Vienna (1980–1989). After obtaining the doctorate (1989), he conducted research on the 2nd Physical Institute of the University of Stuttgart, Germany (1989–1992). In 1992 he received the academic teaching license (venia docendi) by the Central Interuniversitary Commission (YÖK) in Ankara, Turkey. He then went to the Institute for Polymers & Organic Solids at the University of California, Santa Barbara, United States, where he worked between 1992 and 1996 and, together with Alan J. Heeger (Nobel Prize in Chemistry, 2000) discovered and investigated the polymeric organic solar cells. In April 1996, he accepted the appointment as Chair of Physical Chemistry at the Johannes Kepler University Linz.

Since 1996 he gives lectures as a full professor at the JKU and is the head of the Institute for Physical Chemistry. In 2000 he was appointed founding director of the Linz Institute for Organic Solar Cells (LIOS) at JKU. Between 2003 and 2009 he was elected to the City Council of the City of Linz (SPÖ Group). Furthermore, Sarıçiftçi is a founding member of the Linz Circle. He is also a member of various associations and societies: Fellow of the Royal Society of Chemistry (FRSC), American Chemical Society (ACS), Materials Research Society (MRS), Austrian Physical Society (ÖPG), Austrian Chemical Society (GÖCH) and Fellow of SPIE. 2014, he was elected a corresponding member of the Austrian Academy of Sciences (AAS).

== Work and research priorities ==
Sarıçiftçi specializes in the field of organic semiconductors and their applications. In particular, he has worked in the field of organic solar cells. Chemical energy storage of solar energy by means of CO_{2} recycling.

== Awards ==
- Selcuk Yasar Prize of Yasar University in Izmir (2020)
- TUBA Prize of the Turkish Academy of Sciences (2015)
- Wittgenstein-Preis (2012)
- Honorary doctorate awarded by the University of Bucharest in Romania (2012)
- Honorary doctorate awarded by the Åbo Akademi in Finland (2011)
- Kardinal-Innitzer Award (2010)
- Humanity Medal of the City of Linz (2010)
- Austrians of 2008, category Education (ORF and Die Presse)
- Turkish National Science Prize (TUBITAK Bilim Ödülü) 2006
- ENERGY GLOBE Upper Austria 2003, sponsored by the OÖN

== Publications ==
Sarıçiftçi has published more than 600 scientific publications in scientific journals, with an h-index above >130. He is one of the most cited scientists in his field. In a global ranking of the best materials scientists Sarıçiftçi was classified as 14th.
