= Basil Lythgoe =

British organic chemist

Basil Lythgoe FRS
- Born: 18 August 1913; Leigh, Greater Manchester
- Died: 18 April 2009 (aged 95); Wychbold
- Education: Leigh Grammar School; University of Manchester
- Known for: Work on taxine alkaloids and calciferols
- Spouse: Kathleen (Kate) Cameron Hallum
- Children: 2
- Awards: See list
- Scientific career
- Institutions: ICI in Huddersfield; University of Manchester; University of Cambridge; University of Leeds
- Thesis: (1936)
- Doctoral advisor: Ian Heilbron
- Doctoral students: Dudley Williams

Basil Lythgoe FRS (18 August 1913 — 18 April 2009) was a British organic chemist who investigated the structure of many natural substances including nucleosides, plant toxins, and vitamin D2. He was Professor of Organic Chemistry at the University of Leeds.

== Biography ==
Basil Lythgoe was born in Leigh, the second of three children of Peter Whittaker Lythgoe (company secretary of a local textile firm) and Agnes Lily Lythgoe (née Shepherd). Basil, like his father, attended Leigh Grammar School. Aided by a county grant he progressed to the University of Manchester in 1930. His final degree examinations were delayed by a severe throat infection; he graduated in 1934, with first class honours.

Lythgoe stayed at Manchester to work or his PhD, supervised by Professor I M Heilbron, FRS; it was awarded in 1936. He then joined ICI in Huddersfield, where he worked on a synthetic dye, but soon returned to the University of Manchester as an assistant lecturer, where he worked with Alexander R. Todd, successor to Heibron.

In 1946 Lythgoe accompanied Todd to Cambridge as an “assistant in research’” – he was later promoted to Lecturer. Their main area of research was nucleosides. Their findings, and those of others in the group, contributed to determining the correct structure of DNA. By 1948 Lythgoe was working independently, although still on nucleosides. Later, he turned his attention to the structure of macrozamin, a very toxic natural substance.

In 1953 Basil Lythgoe moved to the University of Leeds to take up the professorship of organic chemistry. One of his principal research areas for many years was taxine alkaloids. Lythgoe was an early user of nuclear magnetic resonance (NMR), which helped him determine the correct structure of taxine-I.

Another extensive area of research was calciferols. In one paper he described the synthesis of cholecalciferol, which involved the use of the Wittig reaction. It was “early days for Wittig reagents, and possibly Lythgoe saw this as one of the strengths of the work in the 1958 paper”.

Basil Lythgoe retired in 1978.

== Honours ==
Lythgoe was elected Fellow of the Royal Society (FRS) in 1958. He also was appointed to the Tilden Lectureship of the Chemical Society in 1958, received the Synthetic Organic Chemistry Award of the Chemical Society and the Simonsen Lectureship of the Chemical Society in 1978 and the Chemical Society Award for Organic Synthesis in 1979.

== Family ==
The engagement of Basil Lythgoe and the mathematician Kathleen (Kate) Cameron Hallum was announced in April 1946. They had met at Manchester and were married on 29 June. They had two sons.

Kate died in Leeds on 10 July 2003. Basil Lythgoe developed dementia in later life. He died on 18 April 2009 at a nursing home in Wychbold.
