= James Durrant (chemist) =

British chemist and academic

James Durrant CBE FRS
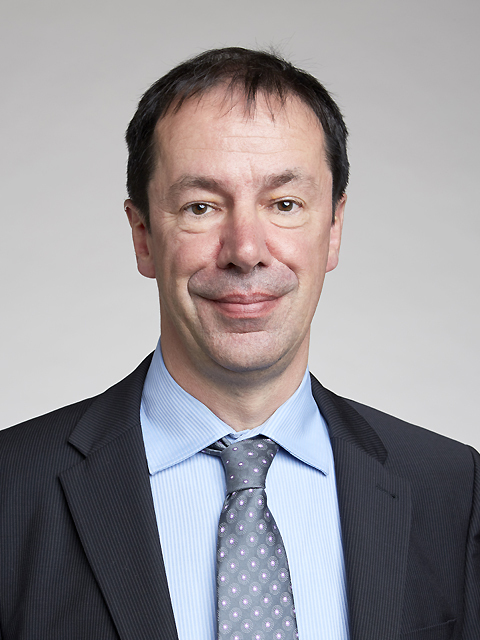
- Durrant in 2017
- Education: Gresham's School; University of Cambridge (BA); Imperial College London (PhD)
- Awards: Tilden Prize (2012); Meldola Medal and Prize (1994)
- Scientific career
- Fields: Solar energy; Photochemistry
- Workplaces: Imperial College London; Swansea University
- Thesis: Transient absorption spectroscopy of photosystem two (1991)
- Doctoral advisor: George Porter; Jim Barber
- Website: imperial.ac.uk/people/j.durrant

James Robert Durrant CBE FRS FRSC FLSW (born 1965) is a British photochemist. He is a professor of photochemistry at Imperial College London and Sêr Cymru Solar Professor at Swansea University. He serves as director of the centre for plastic electronics.

== Education ==
Durrant was educated at Gresham's School in Norfolk, the University of Cambridge and Imperial College London, where he was awarded a PhD in 1991 for research on photosystem II using spectroscopy supervised by George Porter and Jim Barber.

== Career and research ==
Durrant's research focuses on a range of photochemical applications including solar cells, solar fuel production and photocatalysis, nanomaterials and plastic electronics. Durrant has authored over 400 publications, focusing on the charge carrier kinetics which determine materials and device function.

Durrant teaches physical chemistry at Imperial College London

and is involved in the SPECIFIC Innovation and Knowledge Centre (IKC) at Swansea University.

== Honours and awards ==
Durrant was appointed Commander of the Order of the British Empire (CBE) in the 2022 Birthday Honours for services to photochemistry and solar energy research.

- 2018: Awarded Hughes Medal by the Royal Society
- 2017: Elected a Fellow of the Royal Society (FRS) for his research contributions in photochemistry of new materials for use in solar energy conversion – specifically targeting both solar cells in photovoltaic systems and solar to fuel in artificial photosynthesis.
- 2016: Elected a Fellow of the Learned Society of Wales
- 2016: Awarded president's award for excellence in research supervision.
- 2012: Awarded the Tilden Prize by the Royal Society of Chemistry
- 2009: Awarded the Environment Prize by the Royal Society of Chemistry
- 1994: Awarded the Meldola Medal and Prize by the Royal Society of Chemistry
