= Douglas Hugh Everett =

British chemist and academic author

Douglas Hugh Everett FRS FRSE MBE (26 December 1916 – 25 June 2002) was a British chemist and academic author. His most pertinent contributions to science were in the field of thermodynamics.

He famously (in relation to scientists) said: There are some people who live in a dream world, and there are some who face reality: and then there are some who turn one into the other.

== Life ==
He was born in Hampton, London on 26 December 1916 the son of Charles Everett, who was then serving as a Captain in France in the Middlesex Regiment. His father was a bus-driver in civilian life. He was educated at Hampton-on-Thames Grammar School, then studied Chemistry first at the University of Reading (graduating 1938) then postgraduate studies at Balliol College, Oxford. He was a Kitchener Scholar 1936 to 1939 and Ramsay Fellow 1939 to 1941. He gained his first doctorate (PhD) in 1942.

In the Second World War (1942–45) he was allocated to Special Scientific Duties at the War Office. After the war he returned to Oxford University as an ICI Fellow. In 1947 he left England to lecture in Chemistry at Dundee University. This seemed to act as the catalyst to being offered a lecturing post in Oxford, and he almost immediately returned to his alma mater to lecture. However, a counter offer of a Professorship in Dundee tempted him back in 1948. He continued in this role until 1954.

In 1950 he was elected a Fellow of the Royal Society of Edinburgh. His proposers were Edward Copson, George Dawson Preston, David Rutherford Dow and George Howard Bell.

From 1954 he settled in Bristol first as Professor of Chemistry at Bristol University, then Dean of the Faculty of Science (1966–68) and finally Pro-Vice-Chancellor.

The University of Reading granted him an honorary doctorate (DSc) in 1956.

He served as president of the Faraday Society 1976 to 1978.

He died in Bristol on 25 June 2002.

== Family ==
He married Frances Elizabeth Jessop in 1942. She died in 1999. They had two daughters, Susanna and Catharine (Kate).

== Publications ==
- The Structure and Properties of Porous Materials (1958)
- The Solid Gas Interface (1967)
- Introduction to the Study of Chemical Thermodynamics (1972)
- Basic Principles of Colloid Science (1988)
- SOE: The Scientific Secrets (published 2003) co-written with Frederic Boyce
