= Chris Hunter (chemist) =

New Zealand chemist and lecturer

- Born: Christopher Alexander Hunter; 19 February 1965 (age 61); Dunedin, New Zealand
- Other names: Christopher A. Hunter; C. A. Hunter
- Education: Portstewart Primary School; Coleraine Academical Institution
- Alma mater: University of Cambridge
- Spouse: Rosaleen Theresa McHugh
- Children: Three
- Awards: Meldola Medal and Prize (1992); Corday–Morgan Medal and Prize (1999); Fellow of the Royal Society (2008)
- Scientific career
- Fields: Bioorganic chemistry
- Institutions: University of Otago; University of Sheffield; University of Cambridge
- Thesis: (1989)
- Website: ch.cam.ac.uk/person/ch664

Christopher Alexander Hunter, FRS (born 19 February 1965) is a British chemist and academic. Since 2014, he has been Herchel Smith Professor of Organic Chemistry in the Department of Chemistry at the University of Cambridge. His research is currently focused on molecular recognition. He was previously a lecturer at the University of Otago and a lecturer then professor at the University of Sheffield.

== Early life and education ==
Hunter was born on 19 February 1965 in Dunedin, New Zealand. He is the son of John Alexander Hunter and his wife Alice Mary Hunter. He and his family moved to Northern Ireland in 1969. He was educated at Portstewart Primary School and the Coleraine Academical Institution, an all-boys grammar school in Coleraine, County Londonderry. He studied Natural Sciences and then chemistry at the University of Cambridge. He graduated with a Bachelor of Arts (BA) degree in 1986, this was later promoted to Master of Arts (MA Cantab) as per tradition, and with a Doctor of Philosophy (PhD) degree in 1989.

== Career and research ==
Hunter returned to New Zealand to begin his academic career. He was a lecturer in bioorganic chemistry at the University of Otago from 1989 to 1991. He then returned to the United Kingdom and joined the University of Sheffield. He was a lecturer from 1991 to 1994 and reader from 1994 to 1997. He was promoted to professor of chemistry in 1997. He held a Lister Institute Research Fellowship from 1994 to 1999, and an Engineering and Physical Sciences Research Council Senior Research Fellowship from 2005 to 2010.

In September 2013, he was selected as the next Herchel Smith Professor of Organic Chemistry. He joined the University of Cambridge in early 2014 to take up the appointment. There, he is a member of the Synthetic Chemistry Research Interest Group. He is also a Fellow of Emmanuel College, Cambridge.

== Personal life ==
In 2008, Hunter married Rosaleen Theresa McHugh. Together they have three children; two sons and one daughter.

== Awards and honours ==
In 1992, Hunter was jointly awarded the Meldola Medal and Prize by the Royal Society of Chemistry. It is awarded to a British chemist who was under 32 years of age for promising original investigations in chemistry. In 1999, he was jointly awarded the Corday–Morgan Medal and Prize by the Royal Society of Chemistry. It is awarded for 'the most meritorious contributions to chemistry'. In 2008, he was elected a Fellow of the Royal Society (FRS), the premier learned society and national academy for science in the United Kingdom.
