= Royal Institute of Chemistry =

British scientific organisation

Coat of Arms of the RIC

The Royal Institute of Chemistry was a British scientific organisation. Founded in 1877 as the Institute of Chemistry of Great Britain and Ireland (ICGBI), its role was to focus on qualifications and the professional status of chemists, and its aim was to ensure that consulting and analytical chemists were properly trained and qualified.

The society received its first Royal Charter on 13 June 1885, and King George VI awarded the society royal patronage with effect from 14 May 1943, from which date it became the Royal Institute of Chemistry of Great Britain and Ireland (RICGBI). This re-designation was formally confirmed by the grant of a Supplemental Charter on 29 March 1944.

As well as insisting on thorough professional qualifications, it also laid down strict ethical standards. Its main qualifications were Licentiate (LRIC) (professional training following a course of practical study to a standard lower than an honours degree), Graduate (GRIC) (completion of study equivalent to at least second class honours degree), Associate (ARIC) (LRIC plus professional experience), Member (MRIC) (GRIC plus professional experience) and Fellow (FRIC) (more experience and standing than MRIC) of the Royal Institute of Chemistry. Following a supplemental Charter in 1975, Members and Fellows were permitted to use the letters CChem (Chartered Chemist). It published Royal Institute of Chemistry Reviews from 1968 to 1971, when it combined to form Chemical Society Reviews, and the Journal of the Royal Institute of Chemistry.

At the same time, the Chemical Society had concentrated on the science of chemistry, and publishing learned journals. In 1972 these two organisations, together with the Faraday Society and the Society for Analytical Chemistry, started the process of merging, becoming the Royal Society of Chemistry on 15 May 1980.

== Presidents ==
- Sir Edward Frankland: 1877–1880
- Sir Frederick Augustus Abel: 1880–1883
- William Odling: 1883–1888
- James Bell: 1888–1891
- William Augustus Tilden: 1891–1894
- William James Russell: 1894–1897
- Sir Thomas Stevenson: 1897–1900
- John Millar Thomson: 1900–1903
- David Howard: 1903–1906
- Percy Faraday Frankland: 1906–1909
- Sir George Thomas Beilby: 1909–1912
- Raphael Meldola: 1912–1915
- James Johnston Dobbie: 1915–1918
- Sir Herbert Jackson: 1918–1921
- Alfred Chapman: 1921–1924
- George Gerald Henderson: 1924–1927
- Arthur Smithells: 1927–1930
- Sir George Christopher Clayton: 1930–1933
- Sir Jocelyn Field Thorpe: 1933–1936
- Sir Robert Howson Pickard: 1936–1939
- William Alexander Skeen Calder: 1939–1940
- Sir John Jacob Fox: 1940–1943
- Alexander Findlay: 1943–1946
- Gerald Roche Lynch: 1946–1949
- Sir James Wilfred Cook: 1949–1951
- Herbert William Cremer: 1951–1953
- Sir Harry Jephcott: 1953–1955
- Douglas William Kent-Jones: 1955–1957
- William Wardlaw: 1957–1958
- Ernest Le Quesne Herbert: 1959–1961
- Sir William Kershaw Slater: 1961–1963
- Harry Julius Emeleus: 1963–1965
- Sir Frank Hartley: 1965–1967
- Leslie Henry Williams: 1967–1970
- Sir Ewart Ray Herbert Jones: 1970–1972
- Frank Arnold Robinson: 1972–1974
- Charles Kemball: 1974–1976
- Charles Norman Thompson: 1976–1978
- Richard Oswald Chandler Norman: 1978–1980
