= Department of Chemistry, University of Oxford =

Department of the University of Oxford

Coordinates: 51.7581°N 1.2529°W

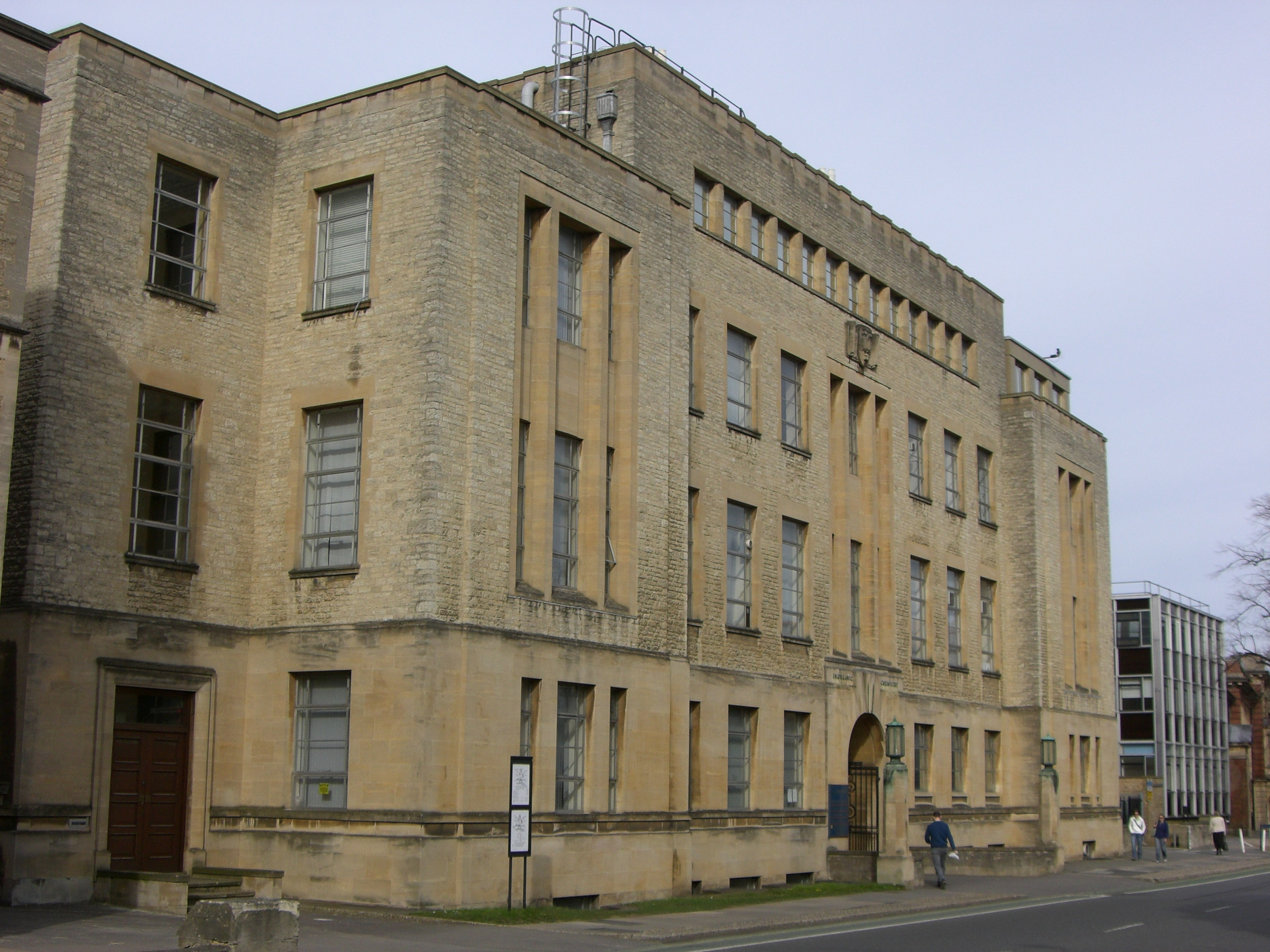
- The Inorganic Chemistry Laboratory (ICL) building in South Parks Road at Oxford
- Established: 1860
- Affiliations: University of Oxford
- Head of Department: Stephen Faulkner
- Location: Oxford, United Kingdom
- Website: chem.ox.ac.uk

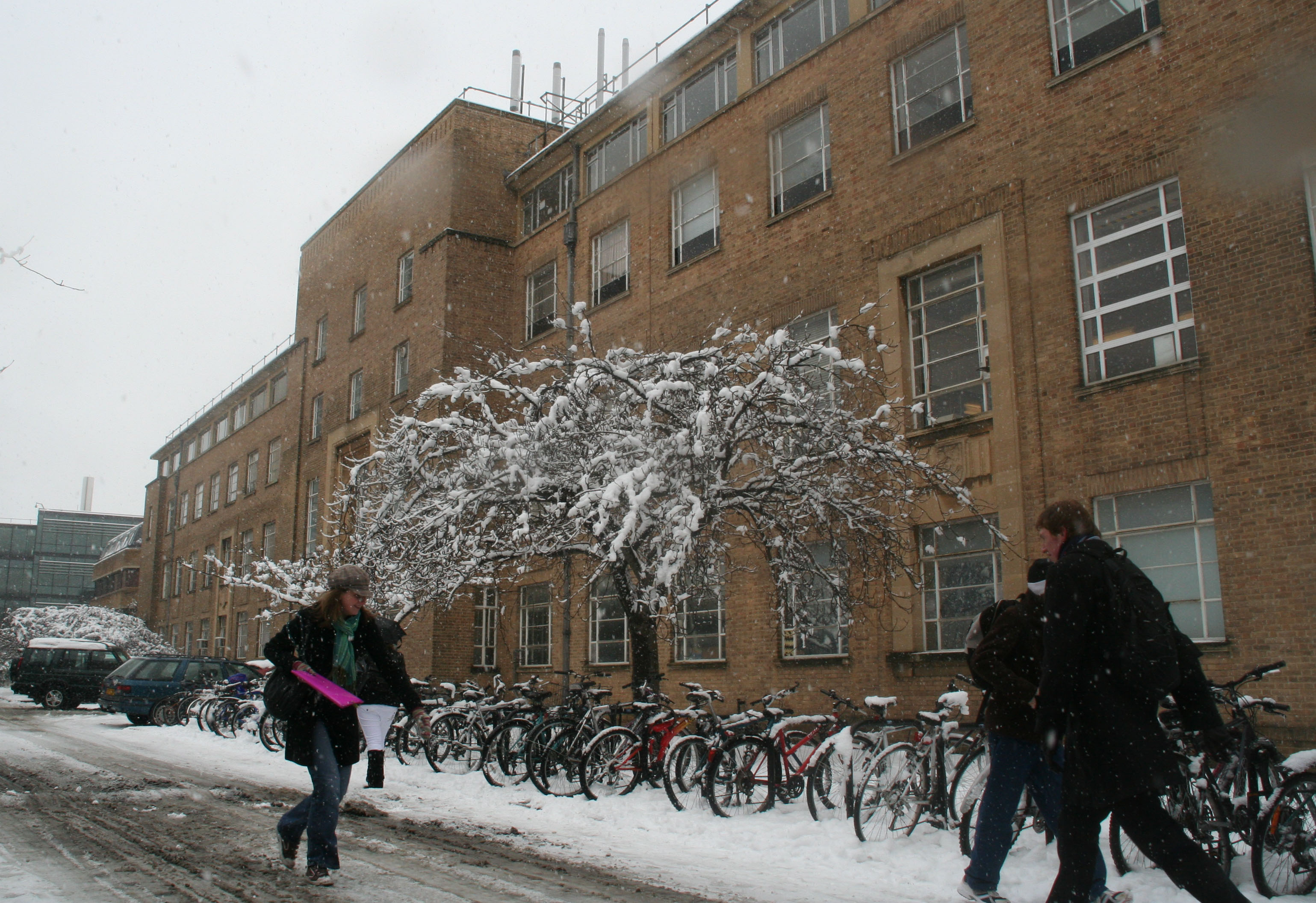
The Physical and Theoretical Chemistry Laboratory (PTCL) building.

The Department of Chemistry is an academic department at the Mathematical, Physical and Life Sciences Division at the University of Oxford in Oxford, England, United Kingdom.

== Overview ==
The department has several laboratories in the Science Area, Oxford:

=== Mansfield Road ===
In Mansfield Road

- Chemical Biology Laboratory
- Chemistry Research Laboratory

=== South Parks Road ===
In South Parks Road

- Inorganic Chemistry Laboratory (ICL)
- Physical and Theoretical Chemistry Laboratory (PTCL)
- Dyson Perrins Laboratory (DP) – research laboratory closed

== History ==
Chemistry has a long history at Oxford. The early pioneer of chemistry Robert Boyle and his assistant Robert Hooke began working in Oxford in the mid-seventeenth century. A chemistry laboratory was built in the basement of the Old Ashmolean Building in 1683, which was used until 1860. Chemical research was also conducted in laboratories set up in individual colleges – Christ Church, Oxford (1767), Magdalen College, Oxford (Daubeny Laboratory, 1848), Balliol College, Oxford (1853, later joined with Trinity College, Oxford to become the Balliol-Trinity Laboratories), Queen's College, Oxford (1900), and Jesus College, Oxford (1907).

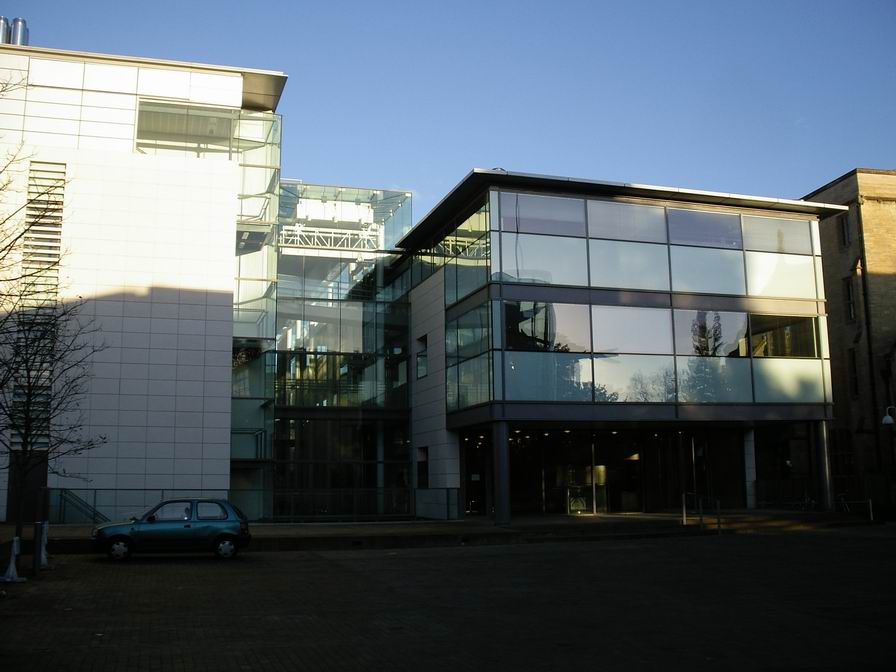
Chemistry Research Laboratory

Chemistry was first recognized as a separate discipline at Oxford with the building of a laboratory attached to the Oxford University Museum of Natural History, opening in 1860. The laboratory is a small octagonal structure to the right of the museum, built in stone in the Victorian Gothic style. The design was based on the Abbot's Kitchen at Glastonbury and it adopted the same name despite being a laboratory. The building was one of the first ever purpose-built chemical laboratories anywhere and was extended in 1878. The Abbot's Kitchen in Oxford was expanded considerably in 1957 to become the main Inorganic Chemistry Laboratory (ICL). The Dyson Perrins Laboratory opened in 1916 and was the centre of the Department of Organic Chemistry until 2003 when it was replaced by the Chemistry Research Laboratory. The Physical Chemistry Laboratory replaced the Balliol-Trinity Laboratories in 1941, and its east wing completed in 1959. The physical and theoretical chemistry departments merged in 1994 and the Physical and Theoretical Chemistry Laboratory became its base in 1995.

A number of professors and scientists who worked in the department had won the Nobel Prize; they include Frederick Soddy for his work on radioactivity with Ernest Rutherford, Cyril Norman Hinshelwood for his work on chemical kinetics, and Dorothy Hodgkin on crystallography. Among the notable achievements by professors in the department are the development of the Periodic Table by William Odling, work on solid state chemistry by John Stuart Anderson and John B. Goodenough (winner of the 2019 Nobel Prize in Chemistry), and bioinorganic chemistry by Robert Williams.

== Notable staff and alumni ==
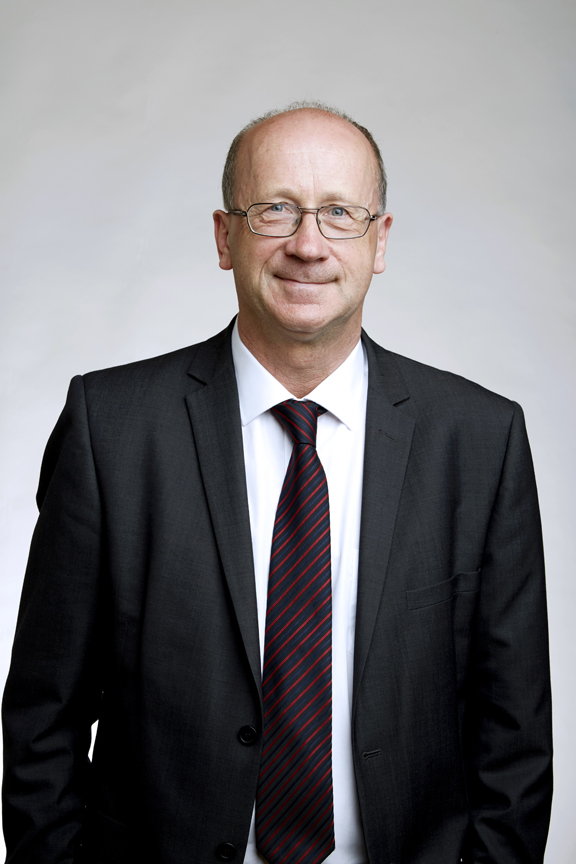
Timothy Softley FRS FRSC FInstP served as head of department from 2011 to 2015

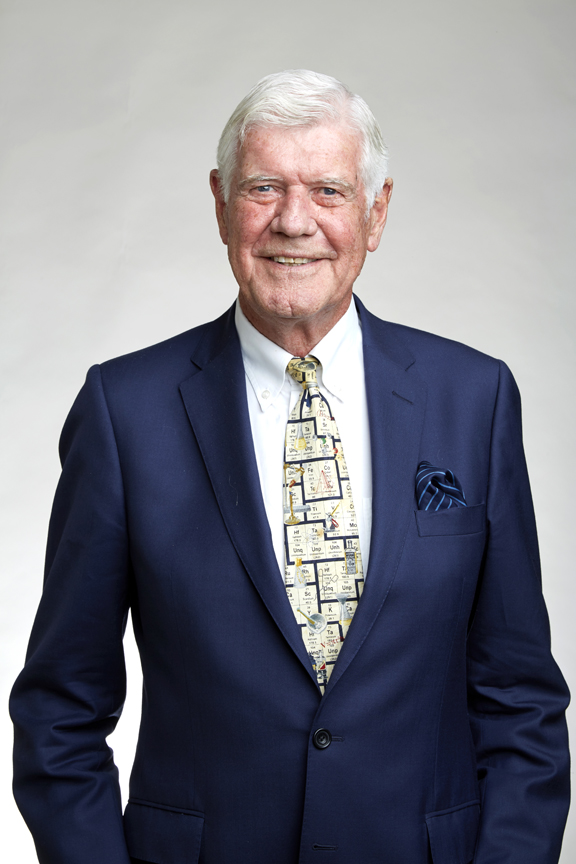
Graham Richards CBE FRS FRSC CChem served as head of department from 1997 to 2006

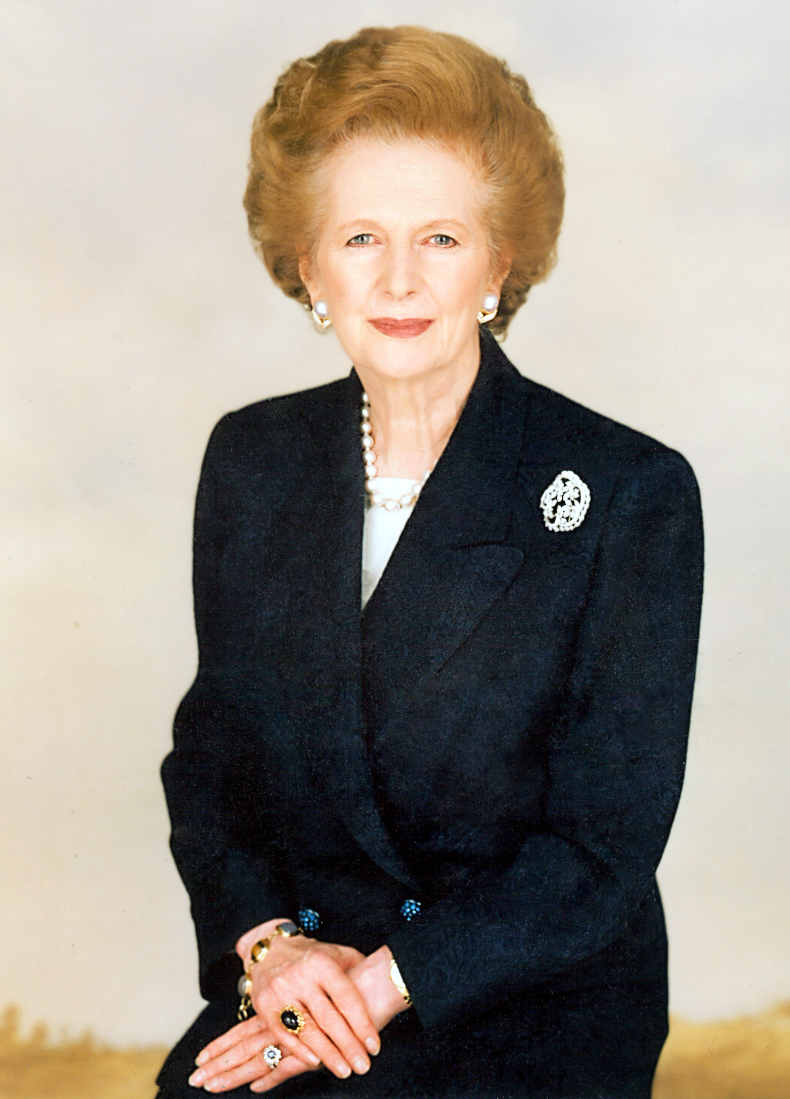
Margaret Thatcher LG OM DStJ PC FRS HonFRSC studied chemistry in the department from 1943

Heads of department have included:

- Mark Brouard 2015-2023
- Timothy Softley FRS 2011 to 2015
- Stephen G. Davies 2006-2011
- Graham Richards FRS 1997 to 2006

Current academics in the Department of Chemistry include:

- Simon Aldridge
- Edward Anderson
- Harry Anderson FRS
- Fraser Armstrong FRS
- Hagan Bayley FRS
- Tom Brown FRSE
- David Clary FRS
- Richard G. Compton
- William I. F. David FRS
- Ben G. Davis FRS
- Andrew Goodwin
- Veronique Gouverneur FRS
- David Hodgson
- Peter J. Hore
- Madhavi Krishnan
- Iain McCulloch FRS
- John McGrady
- Susan Perkin
- Carol Robinson FRS
- Christopher Schofield FRS
- Christiane Timmel
- Claire Vallance
- Charlotte Williams FRS

Other notable staff and alumni include:

- John Albery FRS
- Peter Atkins
- Jack Baldwin FRS
- Ronnie Bell FRS
- Arthur Birch FRS
- Edmund Bowen FRS
- Charles Coulson FRS
- John Cornforth FRS
- Dorothy Crowfoot Hodgkin FRS
- Katherine Holt, Professor at University College London
- Frederick Dainton FRS
- John B. Goodenough ForMemRS
- Malcolm Green FRS
- Andrew Hamilton FRS
- Rita Harradence
- Cyril Hinshelwood FRS
- Ewart Jones FRS
- Jeremy Knowles FRS
- Jack Linnett FRS
- Rex Richards FRS
- Robert Robinson FRS
- John Rowlinson FRS
- John Sutherland FRS
- Margaret Thatcher FRS
- Robert K. Thomas FRS
- Harold Thompson FRS
- R. J. P. Williams FRS
