= Christopher J. Schofield =

British chemist

- Born: Christopher Joseph Schofield; 17 June 1960 (age 66); United Kingdom
- Other names: Chris Schofield, CJS
- Education: University of Manchester (BSc) University of Oxford (DPhil)
- Awards: Fellow of the Royal Society
- Scientific career
- Fields: Hypoxic Response, Epigenetic, Oxygenases, Antibiotic Resistance
- Workplaces: Chemistry Research Laboratory, University of Oxford
- Website: http://schofield.chem.ox.ac.uk/home http://research.chem.ox.ac.uk/christopher-schofield.aspx

Christopher Joseph Schofield (also known as Chris Schofield) is a Professor of Chemistry at the University of Oxford and a Fellow of the Royal Society. Chris Schofield is a professor of organic chemistry at the University of Oxford, Department of Chemistry and a Fellow of Hertford College. Schofield studied functional, structural and mechanistic understanding of enzymes that employ oxygen and 2-oxoglutarate as a co-substrate. His work has opened up new possibilities in antibiotic research, oxygen sensing, and gene regulation.

After work on plant and microbial oxygenases, he studied uncharacterised human oxygenases. His research has identified unanticipated roles for oxygenases in regulating gene expression, importantly in the cellular hypoxic response, and has revealed new post-translational modifications to chromatin and RNA splicing proteins. The work has identified new opportunities for medicinal intervention.

== Education ==
Chris Schofield attended St Anselm's College catholic grammar school in Merseyside, then studied for a Bachelor of Science in chemistry at the University of Manchester and graduated with a first class honour (1979–1982). In 1982, he moved to Oxford to study for a DPhil with Professor Jack E. Baldwin. In 1985, he became a Departmental Demonstrator in the Dyson Perrins Laboratory, Oxford University followed by his appointment as a Lecturer in Chemistry and a Fellow of Hertford College in 1990. In 1998, he became professor of Chemistry, and in 2011 he was appointed the Head of Organic Chemistry at the Department of Chemistry, University of Oxford. In 2013, he was elected a Fellow of the Royal Society, FRS.

== Research ==
The work in laboratory of Chris Schofield focuses on different areas of research, including:

=== Molecular Mechanisms of the Hypoxic Response ===
Hypoxia-inducible factor-1 (HIF-1) is a heterodimeric α,β-transcriptional complex that mediates the cellular response to oxygen availability in multi-cellular organisms, ranging from the simplest known animal Trichoplax adhaerens to humans. Investigating the structures and mechanisms of the HIF prolyl hydroxylases is a current focus of the work. The group solved crystal structures of PHD2 - one of the human prolyl hydroxylases - and discovered that the HIF asparaginyl hydroxylase also catalyses hydroxylation of conserved motifs, the ankyrin repeat domain.

=== Chemical Basis of Epigenetics ===
A current focus of the group is modification of histones, in particular oxygenase catalysed N-demethylation of histone methylated-lysine residues – in collaboration with the Structural Genomics Consortium. The histone demethylases are of interest both with respect to their links to diseases, including cancer and inflammatory diseases, as well as the role of methylation in transcriptional regulation. Recent areas of interest include the fat mass and obesity protein which was shown to be a nucleic acid demethylase and JMJD6 which is a lysyl hydroxylase modifying RNA splicing protein.

=== Structural and Functional Studies on 2OG Oxygenases ===
The 2-oxoglutarate (2OG)-dependent oxygenases are a superfamily of non-haem iron dependent oxygenases, most of which use the Krebs cycle intermediate, 2OG, as a co-substrate. The group are interested in understanding these enzymes for their ability to catalyse synthetically difficult or 'impossible' reactions (e.g. the stereoselective hydroxylation of unactivated carbon-hydrogen bonds), for their diverse physiological roles, and for their links to disease. The research focuses on members of the family that are linked to disease, or can be targeted for the treatment of disease. Techniques involved in this interdisciplinary research include proteomics, X-ray crystallography, nuclear magnetic resonance (NMR) spectroscopy, biological mass spectrometry, molecular biology, enzyme kinetics, protein-directed dynamic combinatorial chemistry and organic synthesis/medicinal chemistry.

=== Antibiotics: Biosynthesis and Resistance Mechanisms ===
Most clinically used antibiotics are based upon natural products. The most important family of antibiotics contains a β-lactam ring, and includes the penicillin, cephalosporin, clavam, and carbapenem antibiotics. The group's biosynthetic work has focused on the clavams and carbapenems, with a particular focus being on the mechanism and structures of enzymes that catalyse chemically 'interesting' steps. The biggest threat to the continued use of β-lactam antibiotics is that of bacterial resistance. Schofield is currently working on the design and synthesis of enzyme inhibitors for the metallo β-lactamases – there are no clinically used inhibitor of these enzymes but they pose a significant threat as they catalyse the hydrolysis of almost all clinically used β-lactam antibiotics. A particular interest involves human metallo β-lactamases which share the same fold.

== Awards and honours ==
2015-2020: Wellcome Trust Advanced Investigator Award (with Sir Peter Ratcliffe)

2013: Fellow of the Royal Society (London); Member of EMBO; Fellow of the Royal Society of Biology, UK; Member of the Biochemical Society; Member of the Society for Experimental Biology, UK

2012: Finalist – Biotechnology and Biological Sciences Research Council 'Innovator of the Year'

2011: Royal Society of Chemistry, Jeremy Knowles Award, UK; Highly cited paper awards (e.g. Biochemical Journal, Bioorganic & Medicinal Chemistry Letters)

2009 – 2014: PI of ERC Advanced Investigator Grant SPA GA 2008 233240 (with Sir Peter Ratcliffe); Molecular Mechanism of Oxygen Sensing by Enzymes (MOOSE)

2000: Fellow of the Royal Society of Chemistry (London)
