= CRL =

CRL may refer to:

== Organisations ==
=== Science and technology research ===
- Chalk River Laboratories, a Canadian nuclear research center
- Charles River Laboratories, an American biomedical company
- Computational Research Laboratories, an Indian computer company
- CRL infrared sky survey

=== Sports leagues ===
- Canada Rugby League, the governing body for rugby league football in Canada
- Championship Racing League, a co-sanctioning arrangement between CART and USAC for the 1980 CART PPG Indy Car World Series
- Country Rugby League, governing body for rugby league football in rural New South Wales, Australia

=== Other organizations ===
- Canons Regular of the Lateran, a Catholic religious order
- Center for Research Libraries, a consortium of North American universities, colleges, and independent research libraries
- Co-operative Retail Logistics, part of the Co-operative Group
- Corsair International, formerly Corsairfly (ICAO airline designator)
- CRL Group, a British video game company

== Science and technology ==
- Certificate revocation list, in computing, a list of revoked certificates
- Chemistry Research Laboratory, University of Oxford, the main chemistry building at Oxford University
- Complete Response Letter, the official FDA response to a New Drug Application
- Crown-rump length, the ultrasound measurement of a foetus

== Transportation infrastructure ==
- Brussels South Charleroi Airport (IATA code CRL)
- Chicago Rail Link, a shortline railroad in Chicago
- City Rail Link, a rail project in Auckland, New Zealand
- Cross Island Line, a planned mass transit line for Singapore

== Other uses ==
- East Cree language (ISO 639-3 code crl)
- Certified Registered Locksmith, as awarded by the Associated Locksmiths of America
- Countrywide Residential Lettings Ltd, a property services group in the UK, owned by Countrywide
