= PTCL (disambiguation) =

PTCL is the acronym for Pakistan Telecommunication Company Limited, a telecommunications company in Pakistan.

PTCL may also refer to:

- Peripheral T-cell lymphoma
- Physical and Theoretical Chemistry Laboratory, University of Oxford, England
