= Physical and Theoretical Chemistry Laboratory (Oxford) =

Chemistry laboratory in Oxford, England

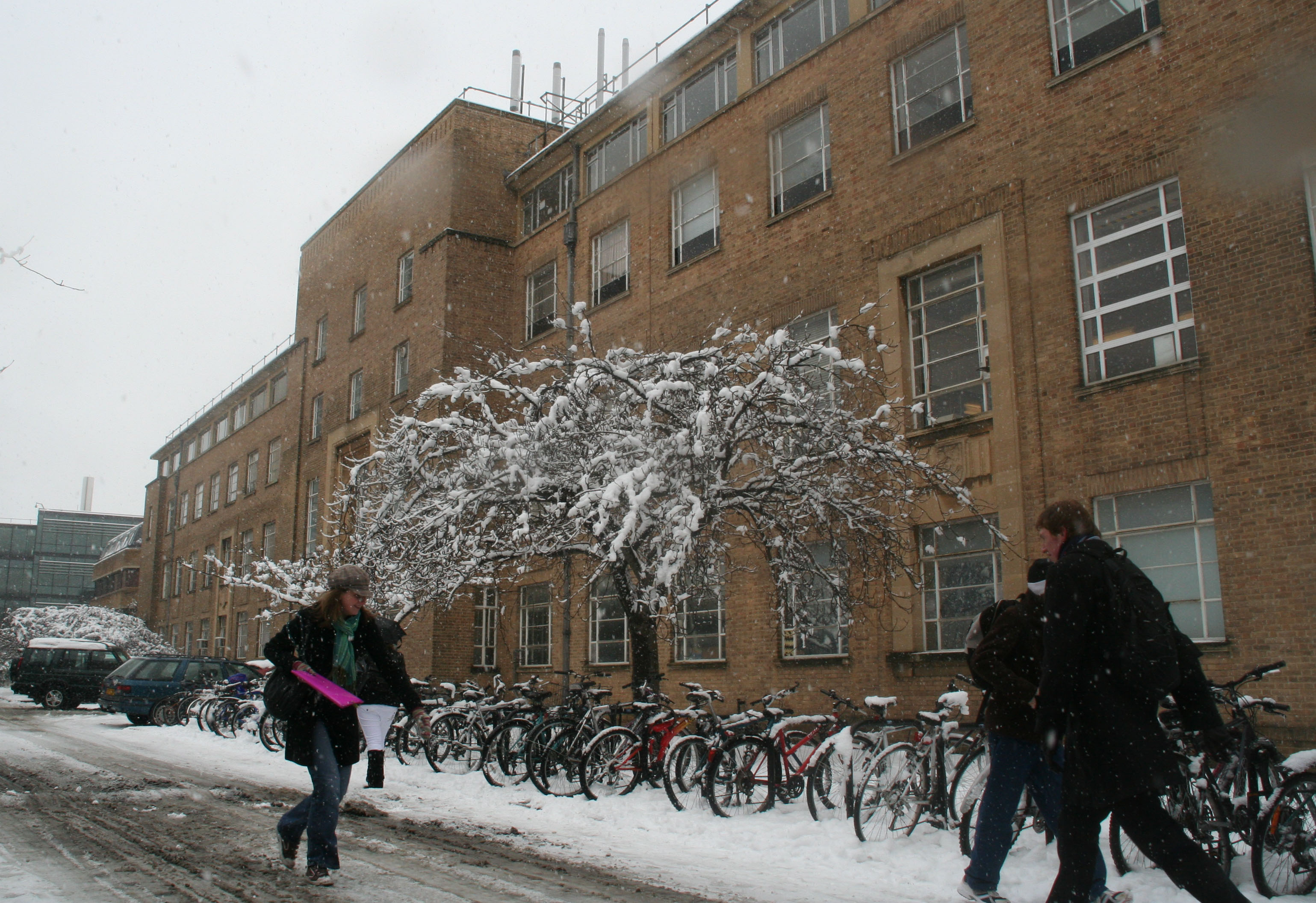
The Physical and Theoretical Chemistry Laboratory in the snow.

The Physical and Theoretical Chemistry Laboratory (PTCL) is a major chemistry laboratory at the University of Oxford, England. It is located in the main Science Area of the university on South Parks Road. Previously it was known as the Physical Chemistry Laboratory.

== History ==
The original Physical Chemistry Laboratory was built in 1941 and at that time also housed the inorganic chemistry laboratory. It replaced the Balliol-Trinity Laboratories. The east wing of the building was completed in 1959 and inorganic chemistry, already in its own building on South Parks Road, then became a separate department in 1961. In 1972, the Department of Theoretical Chemistry was established in a house on South Parks Road, and in 1994, the amalgamation of the physical and theoretical chemistry departments took place. This was followed shortly by the theoretical group moving into the PTCL annexe in 1995.

The university is in the early planning stages of the demolition of the PTCL building, to be replaced by a second chemistry research laboratory.

== Selected chemists ==
The following Oxford Physical and Theoretical chemists are of note:

- John Albery
- Peter Atkins
- Ronnie Bell
- E. J. Bowen
- Richard G. Compton
- Charles Coulson
- Frederick Dainton
- Cyril Hinshelwood
- Peter J. Hore
- Madhavi Krishnan
- Susan Perkin
- Graham Richards
- Rex Richards
- Carol Robinson
- Timothy Softley
- Robert K. Thomas
- Harold Thompson

== See also ==
- Balliol-Trinity Laboratories, a forerunner of the PTCL
- Department of Chemistry, University of Oxford
