= Oxford Chemistry Primers =

Book series

The Oxford Chemistry Primers are a series of short texts providing accounts of a range of essential topics in chemistry and chemical engineering written for undergraduate study. The first primer Organic Synthesis: The Roles of Boron and Silicon was published by Oxford University Press in 1991. As of 2017 there are 100 titles in the series, written by a wide range of authors. The editors are Steve G. Davies (Organic Chemistry), Richard G. Compton (Physical Chemistry), John Evans (Inorganic Chemistry) and Lynn Gladden (Chemical Engineering).

== Titles ==
#	Title	Author(s)	Date Published
1	Organic Synthesis: The roles of boron and silicon	Susan E. Thomas	24 October 1991
2	Aromatic Heterocyclic Chemistry	David T. Davies	13 February 1992
3	Organometallic Reagents in Synthesis	Paul R. Jenkins	23 April 1992
4	Aromatic Chemistry	Malcolm Sainsbury	27 August 1992
5	Polar Rearrangements	Laurence M. Harwood	13 February 1992
6	Oxidation and Reduction in Organic Synthesis	Timothy J. Donohoe	3 August 2000
7	Amino Acid and Peptide Synthesis (2nd edition)	John Jones	16 May 2002
8	Reactive Intermediates	Christopher J. Moody and Gordon H. Whitham	16 July 1992
9	Foundations of Organic Chemistry	Michael Hornby and Josephine Peach	8 April 1993
10	The Mechanisms of Reactions at Transition Metal Sites	Richard A. Henderson	2 December 1993
11	Applications of Artificial Intelligence in Chemistry	Hugh M. Cartwright	9 December 1993
12	Organometallics 1: Complexes with Transition Metal-Carbon s-Bonds	Manfred Bochmann	17 March 1994
13	Organometallics 2: Complexes with Transition Metal-Carbon p-Bonds	Manfred Bochmann	17 March 1994
14	Cluster Molecules of the p-Block Elements	Catherine E. Housecroft	1 May 1994
15	Chemical Bonding (2nd edition)	Mark J. Winter	21 April 2016
16	Periodicity and the p-Block Elements	Nicholas C. Norman	15 May 1997
17	Bifunctional Compounds	Robert S. Ward	17 March 1994
18	Oscillations, Waves, and Chaos in Chemical Kinetics	Stephen K. Scott	4 August 1994
19	Atomic Spectra	T. P. Softley	25 August 1994
20	Chemical Aspects of Biosynthesis	John Mann	29 December 1994
21	Modern Liquid Phase Kinetics	B. G. Cox	2 June 1994
22	Fractals in Chemistry	Andrew Harrison	27 Apr 1995
23	Inorganic Materials Chemistry	Mark T. Weller	19 January 1995
24	Chemical Instrumentation	Richard P. Wayne	22 September 1994
25	Biocoordination Chemistry	David E. Fenton	26 October 1995
26	Energy Levels in Atoms and Molecules	W. G. Richards and P. R. Scott	29 December 1994
27	d-Block Chemistry (2nd edition)	Mark J. Winter	4 June 2015
28	Essentials of Inorganic Chemistry 1	D. M. P. Mingos	25 May 1995
29	Computational Chemistry	Guy H. Grant and W. Graham Richards	30 March 1995
30	Process Development: Fine Chemicals from Grams to Kilograms	Stan Lee and Graham Robinson	20 July 1995
31	Organic Synthesis	Christine L. Willis and Martin Wills	13 July 1995
32	Nuclear Magnetic Resonance (2nd edition)	Peter Hore	28 May 2015
33	Organosulfur Chemistry	Gordon H. Whitham	13 Jul 1995
34	Electrode Dynamics	A. C. Fisher	11 July 1996
35	Functional Groups: Characteristics and Interconversions	G. D. Meakins	11 July 1996
36	Stereoelectronic Effects	A. J. Kirby	9 May 1996
37	Introduction to Quantum Theory and Atomic Structure	P. A. Cox	25 January 1996
38	Organonitrogen Chemistry	Patrick D. Bailey and Keith M. Morgan	18 April 1996
39	Photochemistry	Carol E. Wayne and Richard P. Wayne	9 May 1996
40	Foundations of Physical Chemistry	Charles Lawrence	1 Jul 1996
41	Electrode Potentials	Richard G. Compton and Giles H. W. Sanders	30 May 1996
42	Two-Phase Flow and Heat Transfer	P. B. Whalley	16 May 1996
43	Introduction to Organic Spectroscopy	Laurence M. Harwood and Timothy D.W. Claridge	24 October 1996
44	Metal-Metal Bonded Carbonyl Dimers and Clusters	Catherine E. Housecroft	1 August 1996
45	Mechanisms of Organic Reactions	Howard Maskill	8 August 1996
46	Inorganic Chemistry in Biology	Patricia C. Wilkins and Ralph G. Wilkins	9 January 1997
47	Core Carbonyl Chemistry	John Jones	28 August 1997
48	Quantum Mechanics 1: Foundations	N. J. B. Green	11 September 1997
49	Chemical Reaction Engineering	Ian S. Metcalfe	28 August 1997
50	Heat Transfer	R. H. S. Winterton	17 July 1997
51	Periodicity and the s- and p-Block Elements (2nd edition)	Nicholas C. Norman	01 February 2021
52	Chemical Sensors	Robert W. Cattrall	11 Sep 1997
53	The Basis and Applications of Heterogeneous Catalysis	Michael Bowker	26 February 1998
54	Alicyclic Chemistry	Martin Grossel	2 October 1997
55	Molecular Spectroscopy	John M. Brown	23 July 1998
56	Thermodynamics of Chemical Processes (2nd edition)	Gareth Price	28 March 2019
57	Aquatic Environmental Chemistry	Alan G. Howard	23 July 1998
58	Statistical Thermodynamics (2nd edition)	Andrew Maczek	8 June 2017
59	Surfaces	Gary Attard and Colin Barnes	11 June 1998
60	X-Ray Crystallography (2nd edition, previously Crystal Structure Determination)	William Clegg	21 May 2015
61	Reaction Dynamics	M. Brouard	25 June 1998
62	Inorganic Spectroscopic Methods	Alan K. Brisdon	18 June 1998
63	Stereoselectivity in Organic Synthesis	Garry Procter	23 April 1998
64	Electroanalysis	Christopher M. A. Brett and Ana Maria Oliveira Brett	15 October 1998
65	Quantum Mechanics 2: The Toolkit	Nicholas Green	29 October 1998
66	Essentials of Inorganic Chemistry 2	D. M. P. Mingos	10 September 1998
67	Pericyclic Reactions (2nd edition)	Ian Fleming	2 April 2015
68	Foundations of Physical Chemistry: Worked Examples	Nathan Lawrence, Jay Wadhawan and Richard Compton	28 January 1999
69	Non-aqueous Solvents	John Chipperfield	4 March 1999
70	Sonochemistry	Timothy J. Mason	25 November 1999
71	Chemistry of the First-row Transition Metals	Jon McCleverty	28 January 1999
72	Coordination Chemistry of Macrocyclic Compounds	Edwin C. Constable	28 January 1999
73	The Heavier d-Block Metals: Aspects of Inorganic and Coordination Chemistry	Catherine E. Housefcroft	4 February 1999
74	Supramolecular Chemistry	Paul D. Beer, Philip Gale and David Smith	8 April 1999
75	Magnetochemistry	A. F. Orchard	13 March 2003
76	The f Elements	Nikolas Kaltsoyannis and Peter Scott	8 July 1999
77	Foundations of Science Mathematics (2nd edition)	Devinder Sivia, Joanna Rhodes, and Steve Rawlings	12 November 2020
78	Foundations of Molecular Structure Determination (2nd edition, previously Foundations of Spectroscopy)	Simon Duckett	7 May 2015
79	Process Development: Physicochemical Concepts	John H. Atherton and Keith Carpenter	20 January 2000
80	Aqueous Acid-base Equilibria and Titrations	Robert de Levie	4 November 1999
81	Structure and Reactivity in Organic Chemistry	Howard Maskill	14 October 1999
82	Foundations of Science Mathematics: Worked Problems	D. S. Sivia and S. G. Rawlings	14 October 1999
83	NMR Spectroscopy in Inorganic Chemistry (2nd edition)	Jonathan A. Iggo, Konstantin Luzyanin	30 April 2020
84	Computers in Chemistry	Pete Biggs	6 January 2000
85	Polymers	David J. Walton and Phillip Lorimer	18 May 2000
86	From Molecules to Crystallizers	Roger J. Davey and John Garside	11 May 2000
87	Foundations of Organic Chemistry: Worked Examples	Michael Hornby and Josephine Peach	23 November 2000
88	Organic Stereochemistry	Michael J. T. Robinson	16 March 2000
89	Radiation Heat Transfer	H. R. N. Jones	29 June 2000
90	Top Drugs: Top Synthetic Routes	John Saunders	18 May 2000
91	Radical Chemistry: The Fundamentals	M. John Perkins	11 May 2000
92	NMR: The Toolkit - How Pulse Sequences Work (2nd edition, previously NMR: The Toolkit)	Peter Hore, Jonathan A. Jones and Stephen Wimperis	21 May 2015
93	Foundations of Physics for Chemists	G. A. D. Ritchie and Devinder Sivia	17 August 2000
94	Foundations of Inorganic Chemistry	Mark J. Winter and John Andrew	23 November 2000
95	Protecting Group Chemistry	Jeremy Robertson	3 August 2000
96	Applied Organometallic Chemistry and Catalysis	Robin Whyman	5 July 2001
97	Introduction to Molecular Symmetry	J. S. Ogden	26 July 2001
98	Foundations of Chemical Biology	C. M. Dobson, J. A. Gerrard and A. J. Pratt	20 September 2001
99	Carbohydrate Chemistry	B. G. Davis and Antony J. Fairbanks	6 June 2002
100	Electron Paramagnetic Resonance	Victor Chechik, Emma Carter and Damien Murphy	14 July 2016
101	Computational Chemistry	Jeremy Harvey	8 March 2018
102	Electrochemistry	Wesley R. Browne	19 December 2018
103	Mass Spectrometry	James McCullagh and Neil Oldham	18 June 2019
104	f-Block Chemistry	Helen C. Aspinall	29 May 2020
105	Supramolecular Chemistry: Fundamentals and Applications	Paul Beer, Timothy Barendt, and Jason Lim	01 September 2021
