= List of fellows of the Royal Society elected in 1929 =

A list of fellows of the Royal Society elected in 1929.

== Fellows ==
1. Arthur John Allmand
2. Arthur Henry Reginald Buller
3. Sir Charles Drummond Ellis
4. Sir Ronald Aylmer Fisher
5. George Ridsdale Goldsbrough
6. Sir James Gray
7. Sir Cyril Norman Hinshelwood
8. Augustus Daniel Imms
9. Piotr Leonidovich Kapitza
10. William Dickson Lang
11. John Mellanby
12. Henry Stanley Raper
13. Sir Harry Ralph Ricardo
14. Harold Roper Robinson
15. Frederick William Twort
