= Julia Yeomans =

British theoretical physicist (born 1954)

Julia Yeomans OBE FRS FInstP
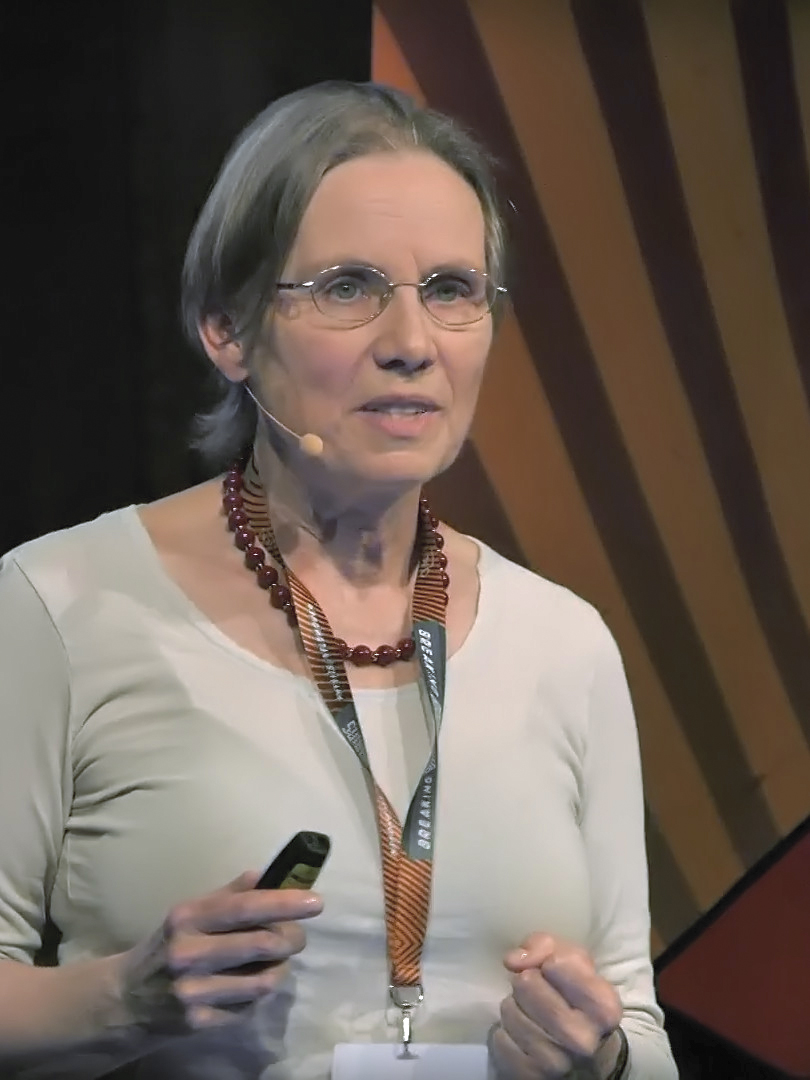
- Yeomans in 2018
- Born: Julia Mary Yeomans
- Education: University of Oxford (BA, DPhil)
- Spouse: Peter Hore (m. 1990)
- Scientific career
- Fields: Statistical physics; Soft matter; Biophysics
- Workplaces: University of Southampton; Cornell University; University of Oxford
- Thesis: Critical phenomena in disordered systems (1979)
- Doctoral advisor: Robin Stinchcombe
- Website: www-thphys.physics.ox.ac.uk/people/JuliaYeomans/

Julia Mary Yeomans OBE FRS is a British theoretical physicist active in the fields of soft condensed matter and biological physics. She has served as Professor of Physics at the University of Oxford since 2002.

== Early life and education ==
Yeomans was educated at the University of Oxford where she was an undergraduate student of Somerville College, Oxford, for her BA and a postgraduate student at Wolfson College, Oxford. She was awarded a Doctor of Philosophy degree in theoretical physics in 1979. where her doctoral research on critical phenomena in spin models was supervised by Robin Stinchcombe.

== Research and career ==
After two years of working as a postdoctoral researcher at Cornell University with Michael E. Fisher, she was appointed a lecturer at the Department of Physics at the University of Southampton in 1981. In 1983, she moved to the University of Oxford where she became a professor in 2002.

Yeomans is a professor at the Rudolf Peierls centre for theoretical physics. Her research investigates theoretical modelling of processes in complex fluids including liquid crystals, drops on hydrophobic surfaces, microchannels, as well as bacteria.

Yeomans' research was presented for a younger and more general audience in Nature's Raincoats: Bio-inspired surface science at the Royal Society summer science exhibition in 2009.

=== Honours and awards ===
In 2012, Yeomans was awarded a European Research Council advanced research grant for her research proposal Microflow in complex environments. In 2024 she was awarded a second advanced grant "Exploiting the Parallels between Active Matter and Mechanobiology".

She was elected a Fellow of the Royal Society (FRS) in 2013, where her nomination reads:

Julia Yeomans is distinguished for her development of novel numerical and analytical modelling tools to investigate a wide range of complex fluids. New approaches are needed for these materials because the physics covers a wide range of length and time scales, from details of microscopic molecular interactions to collective hydrodynamics. Yeomans' research, which combines her expertise in statistical physics with the power of modern computers, is multifaceted, covering self assembly at molecular and macroscopic levels, drops moving in microchannels and on superhydrophobic surfaces, the rheology of highly non-Newtonian fluids such as liquid crystals, and most recently, interactions between bacterial swimmers.

In 2021 she received the Sam Edwards Medal and Prize from the Institute of Physics, for her contributions to soft and active matter, statistical physics and biophysics. In 2024 she was awarded the Liquid Matter Prize from the European Physical Society.

Yeomans was appointed Officer of the Order of the British Empire (OBE) in the 2024 New Year Honours for services to physics.

In 2025, Yeomans was awarded the Dirac Medal and Prize from the Institute of Physics.

== Personal life ==
Yeomans married chemistry professor Peter Hore in 1990.
