= Sam Edwards Medal and Prize =

Prize awarded by the Institute of Physics

The Sam Edwards Medal and Prize is a silver medal awarded annually by the Institute of Physics (Britain's and Ireland's main professional body for physicists) for "distinguished contributions in soft matter physics.". The award, which includes a £1000 prize, was first granted in 2017. It is named after Sam Edwards.

== Recipients ==
Year	Name	Institution	For
2017	Tom McLeish	Durham University	his sustained and outstanding contributions to the fields of molecular rheology, macromolecular biophysics and self-assembly
2019	Wilson Poon	University of Edinburgh	his outstanding contributions to the fundamental study of condensed matter physics, statistical physics and biophysics using model colloidal systems.
2020	Julia Higgins	Imperial College	her pioneering work in neutron scattering applied to the understanding of polymer structure and dynamics.
2021	Julia Yeomans	University of Oxford	developing mathematical models and numerical algorithms to increase our understanding of soft and active matter, statistical physics and biophysics.
2022	Daan Frenkel	University of Cambridge	seminal contributions to the understanding of the kinetics, self-assembly and phase behaviour of soft matter systems, and for developing highly innovative and influential simulation methods.
2023	Ulrich Keyser	University of Cambridge	pioneering the study of transport of structured nucleic-acid molecules through nanopores and the quantification of out-of-equilibrium polymer dynamics at the single-molecule level.
2025	Ard Louis	University of Oxford	pioneering the development of novel mathematical and numerical models that have contributed to understanding of soft matter and biological physics across length scales.

== See also ==
- Institute of Physics
- List of physics awards
- List of awards named after people
