= Ilya Kuprov =

British physicist

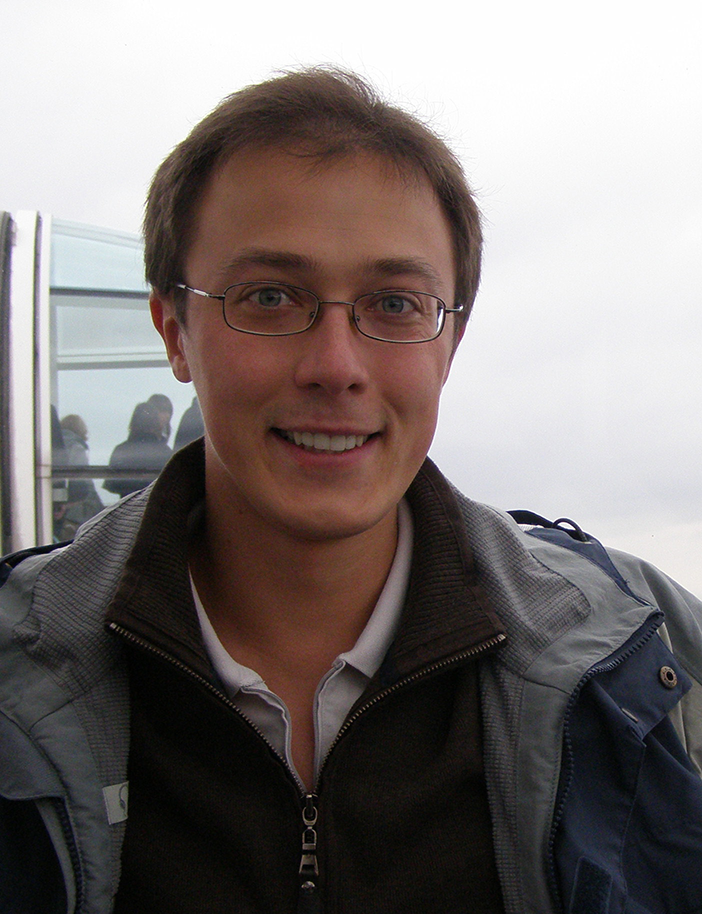
- Ilya Kuprov in 2020
- Born: August 1981 (age 45); Polevskoy, Soviet Union
- Education: Novosibirsk State University; University of Oxford (D.Phil.)
- Known for: Spinach package
- Awards: FRSC (2015); Atreya Award (2022); Ernst Prize (2026)
- Scientific career
- Fields: quantum mechanics, spin dynamics, magnetic resonance
- Workplaces: Weizmann Institute of Science, University of Southampton, University of Oxford
- Thesis: Chemically induced dynamic nuclear polarisation of ^{19}F nuclei (2005)
- Website: spindynamics.org

Ilya Kuprov FRSC is a British scientist whose research focuses on quantum theory of magnetic processes and nuclear magnetic resonance. Kuprov is a professor of physics at the Weizmann Institute of Science, a physical sciences section editor of Science Advances, a fellow of the Royal Society of Chemistry, and a fellow of the International Society of Magnetic Resonance.

== Birth and education ==
Kuprov was born in Polevskoy in what was then the Soviet Union, and raised in Tarko-Sale, a small town near the Siberian Arctic Circle. He completed his undergraduate studies in environmental chemistry at Novosibirsk State University in 2002, and moved to the UK in the same year. In 2005, he received his DPhil degree in physical chemistry from Corpus Christi College, Oxford under the direction of Peter Hore. His doctoral thesis explored chemically induced dynamic nuclear polarisation of ^{19}F nuclei.

== Career ==
In 2005, Kuprov was elected a Fellow by Examination at Magdalen College, Oxford. In 2009, he received an EPSRC Early Career Fellowship, which he held at the Supercomputing Centre of the University of Oxford. In 2014, he was appointed associate professor at the University of Southampton and later promoted to professor. He took up his current professor position at the Weizmann Institute of Science in 2025. In 2018, Kuprov joined the editorial board of Science Advances as an associate editor; he became deputy editor in 2021, and then a physical sciences section editor in 2024. From 2010 to 2021, he was a committee member and then secretary of the Electron Spin Resonance Group of the Royal Society of Chemistry. Kuprov has also been a member of the editorial board of the Journal of Magnetic Resonance Open (the open access branch of the Journal of Magnetic Resonance) since 2019.

== Research and education activities ==
Kuprov's research focuses on theoretical and computational methods in magnetic resonance. As of 2023, his work has produced over 100 scientific publications in peer-reviewed journals and a monograph on spin dynamics. His collaborative research deals with difficult problems in computational modelling of electromagnetic and spin processes.

As a theory and simulation specialist in different teams of researchers, Kuprov has co-authored papers on magnetic navigation of migratory birds, spin dynamics in photosynthesis, lanthanide contrast agents for MRI, chemically induced dynamic nuclear polarisation of amino acids, toroidal spectroscopy of atoms, electron spin resonance problems in structural biology, quantum optimal control theory, and gravitation sensors using atom interferometers.

Kuprov maintains a number of undergraduate and postgraduate online courses in magnetic resonance, computational chemistry, and mathematical methods in chemistry. He is regularly teaching at magnetic resonance summer schools and giving tutorial lectures at magnetic resonance conferences.

== Bibliography ==
Publications by Ilya Kuprov
Area	Publisher	Title	Date	Ref.
Physics	Springer	SPIN: from Basic Symmetries to Quantum Optimal Control	15 Mar 2023	

== Awards and honors ==
- 1999 and 2000 National Mendeleev Prizes for Undergraduate Student Research
- 2005 Fellowship by Examination at Magdalen College, Oxford
- 2009 EPSRC Early Career Fellowship
- 2015 Fellowship of the Royal Society of Chemistry
- 2021 Fellowship of the International Society of Magnetic Resonance
- 2022 Atreya Award for services to Magnetic Resonance
- 2026 Richard R. Ernst Prize for contributions to Magnetic Resonance theory.
