= James Gray (zoologist) =

British zoologist (1891–1975)

Sir James Gray
- Born: 14 October 1891; Wood Green, London, England
- Died: 14 December 1975 (aged 84); Cambridge, Cambridgeshire, England
- Education: University of Cambridge
- Known for: Cytology; Animal locomotion; Gray's Paradox
- Awards: Military Cross (1918); Croix de Guerre avec palme; FRS (1929); CBE (1946); Royal Medal (1948); Knight Bachelor (1954)
- Scientific career
- Fields: Cytology

Sir James Gray, CBE, MC, FRS (14 October 1891 in London – 14 December 1975 in Cambridge, England) was a British zoologist who helped establish the field of cytology. Gray was also known for his work in animal locomotion and the development of experimental zoology. He is known for Gray's Paradox concerning dolphin locomotion.

== Career and research ==
Gray was born in London and graduated from King's College, Cambridge, in 1913. After serving in World War I, he returned to King's College in 1919. He was Professor of Zoology, Cambridge University, from 1937 to 1954, and president of the Marine Biological Association from 1945 to 1955. Post-retirement, Gray become president of the Eugenics Society between 1962 and 1965

== Awards and honours ==
Gray delivered the Croonian Lecture of 1939 to the Royal Society and received their Royal Medal in 1948. He gave the 1951 Royal Institution Christmas Lectures (How Animals Move). Gray was appointed a Commander of the Order of the British Empire in the 1946 New Year Honours, knighted in the 1954 New Year Honours and elected a Fellow of the Royal Society (FRS) in 1931.

Academic offices
Preceded by Jack Cecil Drummond	Fullerian Professor of Physiology; 1944 – 1947	Succeeded by Edward James Salisbury
