= Ard Louis =

Dutch scientist and professor

- Born: Ard A. Louis; Netherlands
- Education: Utrecht University; Cornell University (PhD)
- Awards: Royal Society University Research Fellow
- Scientific career
- Fields: Physics; chemistry; biology
- Workplaces: University of Oxford; University of Cambridge

Ard A. Louis is a Dutch scientist and Professor of Theoretical Physics at the University of Oxford, where he leads an interdisciplinary research group that investigates scientific problems on the border between disciplines such as chemistry, physics, and biology, and is also director of graduate studies in theoretical physics.

== Education and early life ==
Ard A. Louis was born in the Netherlands and raised in Gabon. He received his first degree from the Utrecht University and his PhD in theoretical physics from Cornell University, where he worked with Neil Ashcroft.

== Career and research ==
From 2002 to 2010, Louis was a Royal Society University Research Fellow at the University of Cambridge and the University of Oxford. He is also an associate of the Faraday Institute for Science and Religion. He has written for the BioLogos Foundation, where as of November 2011, he sat on the board of directors. He has been criticised by the Discovery Institute for his opposition to the intelligent design movement. In 2013 he was elected a member of the International Society for Science and Religion. Prior to his post at Oxford, Louis taught theoretical chemistry at the University of Cambridge where he was also director of studies in Natural Sciences at Hughes Hall, Cambridge. With David Malone he made the 4-part documentary Why Are We Here for Tern TV.

Louis also appears in the episode Proof of God in the series The Story of God with Morgan Freeman, giving him an Erdős–Bacon number of 6. He also engages in molecular gastronomy. Louis identifies as a Christian.

He was awarded the 2025 Sam Edwards Prize and Medal from the Institute of Physics "For pioneering the development of novel mathematical and numerical models that have contributed to understanding of soft matter and biological physics across length scales."
