= Tom McLeish =

British theoretical physicist (1962–2023)

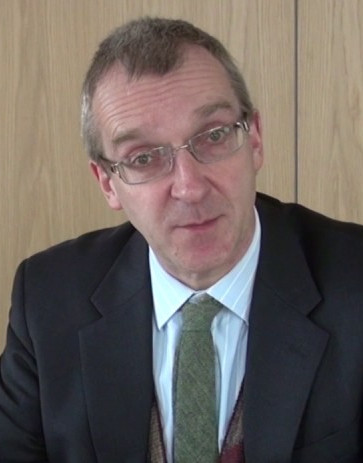
- Born: Thomas Charles Buckland McLeish; 1 May 1962
- Died: 27 February 2023 (aged 60)
- Citizenship: British citizenship
- Education: University of Cambridge
- Spouse: Julie Elizabeth King (m. 1984)
- Children: 4 children
- Awards: FRS (2011); FRSC (2008); FInstP (2003)
- Scientific career
- Fields: Soft matter; Polymer physics; Theoretical physics
- Workplaces: Durham University; University of Leeds; University of Sheffield
- Thesis: Molecular models of polymeric flows (1987)
- Website: tcbmcleish.wordpress.com

Thomas Charles Buckland McLeish FRS FRSC FInstP (1 May 1962 – 27 February 2023) was a British theoretical physicist.

His work is renowned for increasing understanding of the properties of soft matter. This is a matter that can be easily changed by stress – including liquids, foams and biological materials. He was a professor in the Durham University Department of Physics and director of the Durham Centre for Soft Matter, a multidisciplinary team that works across physics, chemistry, mathematics and engineering. He also was the first Chair of Natural Philosophy at the University of York.

== Early life and education ==
McLeish was born on 1 May 1962. He was educated at Sevenoaks School in Kent and Emmanuel College, Cambridge where he was awarded a Bachelor of Arts degree in 1984 (MA, 1987) and a PhD in 1987 for research on fluid dynamics.

== Academic career ==
McLeish began his academic career as a lecturer in physics at the University of Sheffield (1989 to 1993). He then moved to the University of Leeds, where he was Professor of Polymer Physics between 1993 and 2008. He was a Professor of Physics at the University of Durham from 2008 to 2018. He was additionally Pro-Vice-Chancellor for Research between 2008 and 2014.

In February 2018, McLeish moved to the University of York to take up the newly created Chair in Natural Philosophy.

=== Research ===
Although McLeish's work was mostly theoretical, he also worked closely with those performing experiments and in industry. He made significant advances in modelling the structure and properties of complex entangled molecules, blends of substances that don't usually mix (multiphasic liquids like oil and water - see reptation and crazing). This allows complex fluid behaviour and processing in an industrial setting to be more easily predicted. Since 2000 he worked on biological physics: applying soft matter physics to the self-assembly of protein fibrils, protein fluctuation dynamics and its role in allosteric signalling, and statistical mechanics approaches to evolution. As of 2015 he had published around 200 papers in peer reviewed scientific journals.

== Personal life ==
In 1984, McLeish married Julie Elizabeth King. Together they had four children: two sons and two daughters.

McLeish's other interests included historical studies of medieval science, and he was a member of the Institute of Medieval and Early Modern Studies at Durham. In 1993, he became a lay preacher in the Anglican Church, delivering sermons at St Michael le Belfrey, York. In 2014, he published a book on the relationship between religion and science called Faith and Wisdom in Science.

McLeish died on 27 February 2023, at the age of 60. A service of memorial and thanksgiving was held at York Minster Cathedral on 27 April 2023, a recording of which is available on the cathedral's YouTube channel.

== Honours ==
McLeish was made a Fellow of the Institute of Physics (FInstP) in 2003, and a Fellow of the Royal Society of Chemistry (FRSC) in 2008. In 2011, he was elected a Fellow of the Royal Society (FRS), the United Kingdom's national academy of the sciences.

In 2007, McLeish was awarded the Weissenberg medal by the European Society of Rheology. This is awarded to rheologists conducting research in Europe for outstanding, long-term achievements.

McLeish also received the Society of Rheology's Bingham Medal in 2010.

In 2017, McLeish received the Sam Edwards Medal and Prize for "his sustained and outstanding contributions to the fields of molecular rheology, macromolecular biophysics and self-assembly".

In 2018, McLeish was awarded the Lanfranc Award for Education and Scholarship by the Archbishop of Canterbury "for his record as one of the most outstanding scientists of his generation, and the leading contemporary lay Anglican voice in the dialogue of science and faith".

McLeish gave the 2021 Boyle Lecture (International Society for Science and Religion, ISSR) entitled "Rediscovering Science as Contemplation." A recording is available on the ISSR's YouTube channel.

== Selected publications ==
- The Poetry and Music of Science: Comparing Creativity in Science and Art (2019) OXFORD University Press, ISBN 9780198797999
- Soft Matter – An Emergent Interdisciplinary Science of Emergent Entities, Chapter 20 in The Routledge Handbook of Emergence, (eds.) (2019) LONDON: Routledge, ISBN 9781315675213
- The Science and Religion Delusion: Towards a Theology of Science, in Knowing Creation - Perspectives from Philosophy, Theology and Science Eds. (2018) Zondervan Academic, ISBN 9780310536130
- Faith and Wisdom in Science (2016) OXFORD University Press, ISBN 9780198757559
