= Primerdesign =

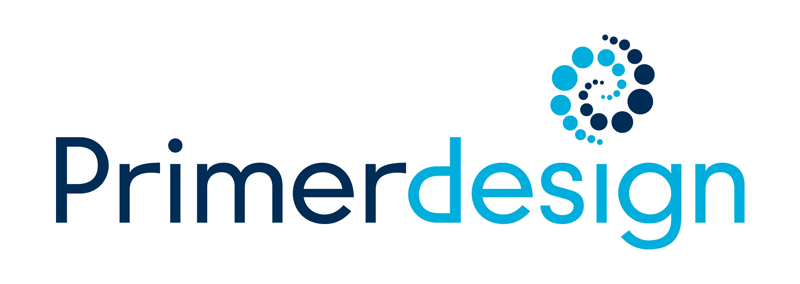
- Industry: Biotechnology
- Founded: 2005
- Headquarters: Chandler's Ford, United Kingdom
- Area served: Worldwide
- Key people: Dr Jim Wicks, Dr Rob Powell and Professor Tom Brown
- Parent: Novacyt
- Website: Primerdesign.co.uk

Primerdesign is a UK-based biotechnology company that designs and sells products for quantitative real-time polymerase chain reaction (qPCR).

== History ==
Primerdesign was founded in 2005 by Dr Jim Wicks, Dr Rob Powell and Professor Tom Brown within the University of Southampton to focus on PCR and DNA chemistry. The company has grown since then and its products have been used in over 100 countries. The company has a portfolio of over 400 qPCR detection kits and over 9000 research targets.

== Swine flu detection kit ==
During the swine flu pandemic in 2009, Primerdesign developed the world's first swine flu detection kit. The kit, which was designed within a fortnight, was designed to give results within two hours. The first shipment of rapid result tests was dispatched to Mexico in April 2009 and is now being used in more than 30 countries.

== Horse meat scandal ==
The company responded to the 2013 meat adulteration scandal by being able to provide qPCR kits to quantitatively measure for horse meat in food. Their kits were used throughout Ireland as well as the UK.

== Coronavirus ==
In January 2020 the company launched a molecular test for SARS-CoV-2. The test was approved as eligible for procurement under the World Health Organization's (WHO) Emergency Use Listing process in April 2020, meaning that the test can be supplied by the United Nations and other procurement agencies supporting the COVID-19 response. In the same month Novacyt announced a collaboration with AstraZeneca, GlaxoSmithKline and the University of Cambridge to support the UK in its COVID-19 national screening programme at a new testing laboratory at the university's Anne McLaren laboratory.

== Products ==
Among their product ranges are lines for:

- Pathogen detection kits
- House-keeping gene assays
- Genomic DNA detection kits
- Real-time PCR reagents
- geNorm reference gene selection kits
- Housekeeping gene selection kits
- Biobank Control cDNA
- High Resolution Melting analysis kits

== Customers ==
Primerdesign's customers include academic institutions, pharmaceutical companies, independent diagnostic laboratories, hospitals, and official government health agencies.

== Sponsorship program ==
In 2006, Primerdesign initiated a sponsorship program for PhD students and provide further assistance to the PCR component of their study.

== See also ==
- Real-time polymerase chain reaction
- High Resolution Melt
- COVID-19 testing
