= Novacyt =

Anglo-French biotechnology group

Novacyt S.A.
- Type: Société Anonyme
- Traded as: LSE: NCYT; Euronext: ALNOV
- Industry: Biotechnology
- Founded: 2006
- Headquarters: Camberley, Surrey, United Kingdom
- Key people: David Allmond (CEO)
- Products: In vitro and molecular diagnostics
- Subsidiaries: Primerdesign
- Website: www.novacyt.com

Novacyt Group (/ˈnoʊvəsaɪt/ NOH-və-syte) is an Anglo-French biotechnology group focused on clinical diagnostics, with offices in Camberley, Surrey, United Kingdom and Vélizy-Villacoublay, France. The company produces in vitro and molecular diagnostic tests, supplying assays and reagents worldwide. Its business units include Primerdesign, Microgen Bioproducts and Lab21 Healthcare.

In January 2020 the company announced that its molecular diagnostics division, Primerdesign, had launched a molecular test for the 2019 strain of SARSr-CoV. The test was approved as eligible for procurement under the World Health Organization's (WHO) Emergency Use Listing process in April 2020, meaning that the test could be supplied by the United Nations and other procurement agencies supporting the COVID-19 response. In the same month Novacyt announced a collaboration with AstraZeneca, GlaxoSmithKline and the University of Cambridge to support the UK in its COVID-19 national screening programme at a new testing laboratory at the university's Anne McLaren laboratory.
