= Tom Brown (chemist) =

British chemist

- Born: 10 November 1952 (age 73); Barnsley, West Riding of Yorkshire, England
- Education: University of Bradford
- Known for: DNA Repair, Molecular genetics, DNA Click chemistry, Primerdesign
- Awards: FRSC; FRSE (1993); Makdougall Brisbane Prize (1992); RSC Interdisciplinary Award(2009); Chemistry World Entrepreneur of the Year(2014)
- Scientific career
- Fields: Chemical biology, Nanotechnology
- Workplaces: University of Oxford; University of Southampton; University of Edinburgh
- Thesis: The chemistry of some imidazoles. (1979)
- Doctoral advisor: Gordon Shaw
- Other academic advisors: Olga Kennard OBE FRS
- Website: browngroupnucleicacidsresearch.org.uk

Tom Brown FRSC FRSE (born 10 November 1952) is a British chemist, biotechnologist, and entrepreneur. He is the Professor of Nucleic acid chemistry at the Department of Chemistry and Department of Oncology at the University of Oxford. Currently, he is serving as the President of the Chemical Biology Interface Division of the Royal Society of Chemistry. He is best known for his contribution in the field of DNA Repair, DNA Click chemistry, and in the application of Molecular genetics in forensics and diagnostics.

He co-founded three biotechnology companies: Oswel Research Products, ATDBio, and Primerdesign. As of January 2016, he is in the board of directors of last two.

== Education and career ==
Brown was born in Barnsley, West Riding of Yorkshire, and attended Broadway Grammar School there. As an undergraduate student, he attended University of Bradford to study chemistry where he obtained his bachelor's degree with first class honours, and was awarded the Griffin and George Prize for being the most outstanding graduate. In 1979, he earned his PhD from the same university, under the supervision of Prof Gordon Shaw. He then carried out his post-doctoral research at the University of Nottingham (with Leslie Crombie and Gerry Pattenden), University of Oxford (with John Jones), and at the University of Cambridge (with Olga Kennard OBE FRS).

After these post-doctoral stints, he was appointed as a Lecturer at the University of Edinburgh where he was subsequently promoted to the rank of Reader and then to Professor. In 1995, he moved to the University of Southampton where he worked as a Professor of Chemical Biology. In 2013, Brown again moved, to take up position of the Professor of Nucleic acid chemistry at the University of Oxford where he now holds a joint position at the Department of Chemistry and Department of Oncology. In 2014, he was elected as the President of the Chemical Biology Interface Division of the Royal Society of Chemistry for a term of three years.

== Research ==
In early part of his academic career, Brown studied base-pair mismatch and DNA repair. Later he worked on the mutagenic effect of chemically modified DNA bases. In collaboration with Laurence Pearl, he elucidated the structural basis of excision repair by Uracil-DNA glycosylase. His group is also well known for rapid mutation analysis and for the application of Molecular genetics in forensics and diagnostics. In collaboration with AstraZeneca, they invented Scorpion Primers system, a fluorescence-based real-time PCR method that can identify mutations and Single-nucleotide polymorphism in human genome. Most recently, his group is focusing on the Click chemistry based chemical modification of DNA and its application in bionanotechnology sector.

As of January 2016, Brown has published more than 300 articles in peer-reviewed journals, with many of his papers appearing in highly selective journals like Nature, Nature Biotechnology, Cell, Nucleic Acids Research, JACS, and PNAS. His papers have been cited over 18,000 times and he has an h-index 68.

== Awards and honours ==
Brown was elected as a fellow of the Royal Society of Chemistry and Royal Society of Edinburgh.

Apart from that, he has received the following major honours in recognition of his research work:

- 1992: Brown received Makdougall Brisbane Prize from the Royal Society of Edinburgh.
- 1992: Brown was awarded Josef Loschmidt Award by the Royal Society of Chemistry
- 2004: Brown received Leverhulme Trust Senior Research Fellowship from the Royal Society.
- 2008: Brown delivered Keynote Lecture at the Molecular Frontiers Symposium, in the Institute of Bioengineering and Nanotechnology, A*STAR.
- 2009: Brown received RSC Interdisciplinary Award from the Royal Society of Chemistry
- 2014: Brown received Chemistry World Entrepreneur of the Year Award.
- 2015: Brown delivered the invited lecture at the Nobel workshop, organised by the Royal Swedish Academy of Sciences and Chalmers.
- 2015: Brown was awarded MPLS Impact lifetime Award by the Mathematical, Physical and Life Sciences Division (MPLS) of the University of Oxford
- 2016: Brown received the BBSRC Commercial Innovator of the Year 2016 award and BBSRC Innovator of the Year 2016 award.

== Companies ==
While working at the University of Edinburgh, Brown founded Oswel Research Products (the name 'Oswel' came from "Oligonucleotide synthesis" and "Wellcome Trust"), a company which was dedicated to automated DNA synthesis. Later, in 1995, the company moved to Southampton, along with Brown. In the year 1999, when the company had turnover of GBP 2.2 million and a profit of GBP 0.7 million, Eurogentec acquired Oswel.

In 2004, Brown co-founded (along with two of his University of Southampton colleagues) Primerdesign, a company which designs and manufactures products for quantitative Real-time polymerase chain reaction. The company is best known for creating rapid Swine Flu detection kit in 2009, and for creating a test for the SARS-CoV-2 virus strain in 2020.

In 2005, Brown founded ATDBio with an aim to synthesize chemically modified oligonucleotides for technical applications. As of June 2014, this company maintains two different labs at Southampton and Oxford.
