= Balliol-Trinity Laboratories =

Former chemistry laboratory in Oxford, England

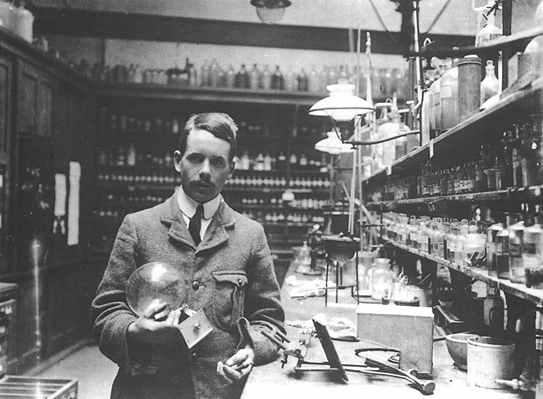
Henry Moseley in the Balliol-Trinity Laboratories in 1910.

The Balliol-Trinity Laboratories in Oxford, England, was an early chemistry laboratory at the University of Oxford. The laboratory was located between Balliol College and Trinity College, hence the name. It was especially known for physical chemistry.

Chemistry was first recognised as a separate discipline at Oxford University in the 19th century. From 1855, a chemistry laboratory existed in a basement at Balliol College. In 1879, Balliol and Trinity agreed to have a laboratory at the boundary of the two colleges. The laboratory became the strongest of the Oxford college research institutions in chemistry. It remained in operation until the Second World War when a new Physical Chemistry Laboratory (PCL) was constructed by Oxford University in the Science Area.

== People ==
The following scientists of note worked in the Balliol-Trinity Laboratories:

- E. J. Bowen
- Sir John Conroy
- Sir Harold Hartley
- Sir Cyril Norman Hinshelwood (Nobel Prize winner)
- Henry Moseley

== See also ==
- Abbot's Kitchen, Oxford, another early chemistry laboratory in Oxford
- Department of Chemistry, University of Oxford
- Physical Chemistry Laboratory, which replaced the Balliol-Trinity Laboratories
