= Mark Brouard =

Professor of chemistry

Professor Mark Brouard
- Born: 1959 (age 66–67)
- Title: Professor of Chemistry

Academic background
- Education: Wadham College, Oxford; Linacre College, Oxford
- Doctoral advisor: M. J. Pilling

Academic work
- Discipline: Chemistry
- Sub-discipline: Physical chemistry Reaction dynamics Photodissociation
- Institutions: University of Nottingham; Jesus College, Oxford

Mark Brouard (born February 1959) is Helen Morag Fellow and Tutor in Chemistry at Jesus College, and is a professor of chemistry at the University of Oxford, where he was head of the Department of Chemistry from 2015–2023. He is a specialist in reaction dynamics. In collaboration with professor Claire Vallance, Brouard has created the PImMS (Pixel Imaging Mass Spectrometry) sensor, claimed to be "the fastest camera in the world", which is used to detect particles.

== Academic career ==
Brouard was an undergraduate student at Wadham College, Oxford and a graduate student at Linacre College, Oxford, where his doctoral work was supervised by M. J. Pilling. After obtaining his DPhil he moved to the University of Nottingham as a postdoctoral researcher, working with John Simons. He became a lecturer at the university in 1989.

Brouard became a Fellow of Jesus College in 1993. He has served as the college's Vice-Principal since 2024.

== Honours ==
Brouard is a past recipient of the Royal Society of Chemistry's Chemical Dynamics Award.

== Selected publications ==
- Tutorials in Molecular Reaction Dynamics. Royal Society of Chemistry, 2010. (Joint editor with Claire Vallance)
