= Ben G. Davis =

Chemistry professor

Ben Davis FRS FMedSci
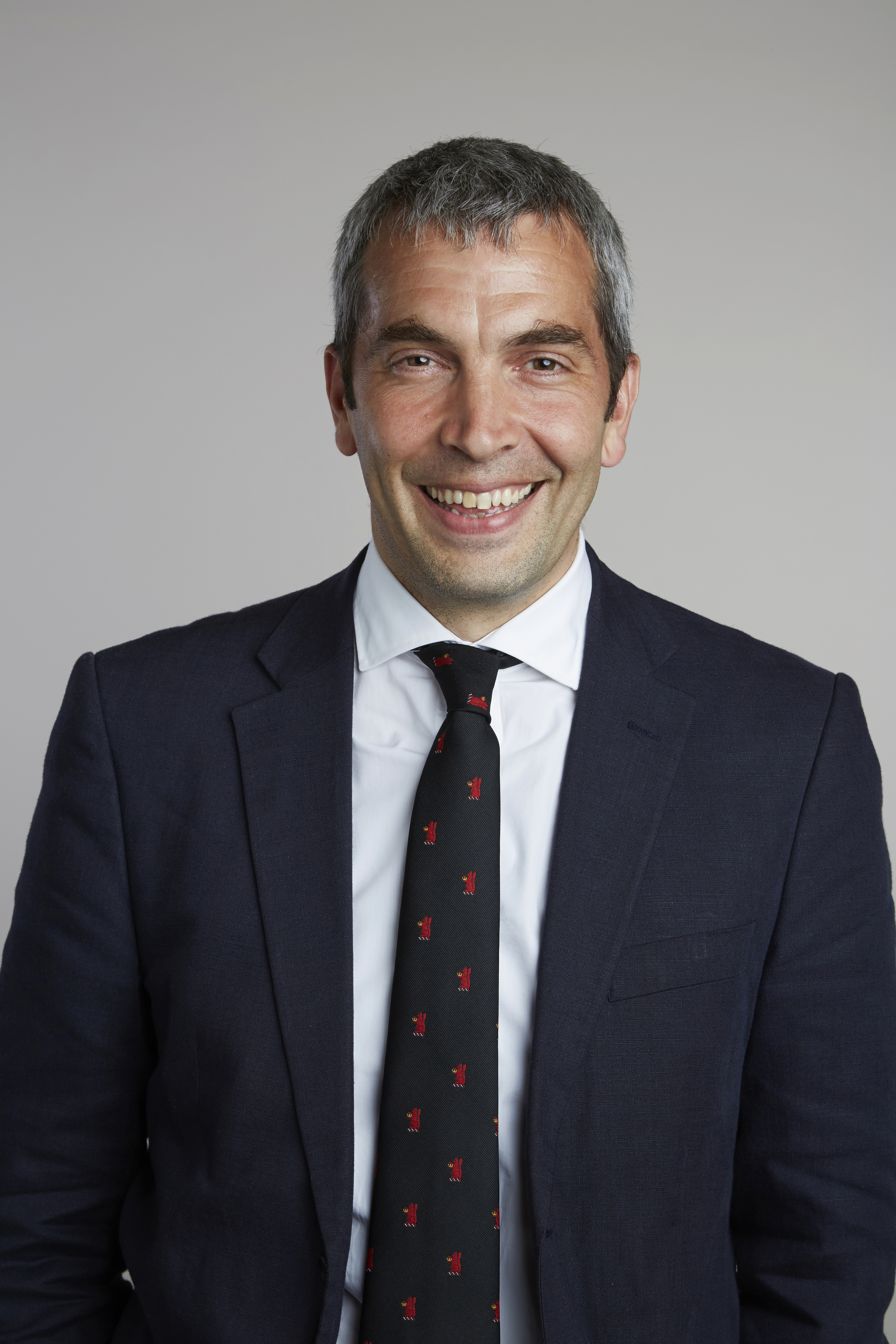
- Davis in 2015
- Born: Benjamin Guy Davis; 8 August 1970 (age 55); Hatfield, Hertfordshire
- Other name: Benjamin
- Education: Nottingham High School
- Alma mater: University of Oxford
- Awards: Davy Medal (2020); Whistler Award (2016); Corday-Morgan Medal (2005); Mullard Award (2005); Philip Leverhulme Prize (2002); Meldola Medal and Prize (1999)
- Scientific career
- Fields: Chemistry; Chemical Biology; Glycoproteins
- Institutions: University of Toronto; Durham University; University of Oxford; Pembroke College, Oxford; Rosalind Franklin Institute
- Thesis: Synthesis of inhibitors of sugar processing enzymes (1996)
- Doctoral advisor: George Fleet
- Other academic advisors: J. Bryan Jones
- Website: users.ox.ac.uk/~dplb0149

Notes
- bsky.app/profile/bendavisgroup.bsky.social

Benjamin Guy Davis (born 8 August 1970) is a British chemist who is Professor of Chemical biology in the Department of Pharmacology and a member of the Faculty (by courtesy) in the Department of Chemistry at the University of Oxford and a Fellow of Pembroke College, Oxford. He also holds the role of Science Director for Next Generation Chemistry (2019-) at the Rosalind Franklin Institute.

== Education ==
Davis was privately educated at Nottingham High School followed by the University of Oxford where he was awarded Bachelor of Arts degree in Chemistry (with Chemical Pharmacology) in 1993 and a Doctor of Philosophy in 1996 supervised by George Fleet. He was a student of Keble College, Oxford.

== Research and career ==
Davis spent two years as a postdoctoral research fellow in the laboratory of J. Bryan Jones at the University of Toronto, exploring protein chemistry and biocatalysis. There he developed, with Jones and Genencor International Inc., early examples of targeted protein degradation systems. In 1998 he returned to the United Kingdom to take up a lectureship at Durham University. In the autumn of 2001 he moved to the Dyson Perrins Laboratory in the Department of Chemistry and received a fellowship at Pembroke College, Oxford. He was promoted to Professor of Chemistry in 2005. In 2021 in a new partnership between the Rosalind Franklin Institute and the University of Oxford he took up a joint position between Medical Sciences in the Department of Pharmacology and the role of Science Director for Next Generation Chemistry. From 2020-2024 he was the Deputy Director and then the Interim Director (November 2023 to April 2024) of the Rosalind Franklin Institute.

His group's research centres on the chemical understanding and exploitation of biomolecular function (synthetic biology, chemical biology and chemical medicine), with an emphasis on carbohydrates and proteins. In particular, the group's interests encompass synthesis and methodology; target biomolecule synthesis; inhibitor/probe/substrate design; biocatalysis; enzyme and biomolecule mechanism; biosynthetic pathway determination; protein engineering; drug delivery; molecular biology; structural biology; cell biology; glycobiology; molecular imaging and in vivo biology.

Research in the Davis laboratory has been funded by the Engineering and Physical Sciences Research Council, the Biotechnology and Biological Sciences Research Council, the Medical Research Council, UCB-Celltech, AstraZeneca, the European Union, GlaxoSmithKline, Cancer Research UK, the Wellcome Trust and the Royal Society.

=== Awards and honours ===
Davis was elected a Fellow of the Royal Society in 2015. His certificate of election reads:

Professor Davis is noted for his chemical interrogation and manipulation of biological systems, particularly those that hinge on carbohydrates and proteins. He has developed selective and benign bond forming strategies that have been applied to biology, allowing the construction of synthetic biomolecules and bioconjugates; the creation of synthetic cells and viruses; and in vivo chemistry. These have enabled associated mechanistic details of protein and sugar biology to be elucidated and exploited for biotechnological applications.

In 2017, he was elected a Member of the Academia Europea and in 2019, he was elected a Fellow of the Academy of Medical Sciences.

He was also a recipient of the Mullard Award from the Royal Society in 2005, the Philip Leverhulme Prize in 2002 and the Meldola Medal and Prize in 1999 from the Royal Society of Chemistry. He won the Whistler Award of the International Carbohydrate Organization in 2016. He also received the Davy Medal ("awarded for outstanding contributions in the field of chemistry") from the Royal Society in 2020.
