= Gray's paradox =

Paradox about the speed versus muscle mass of dolphins

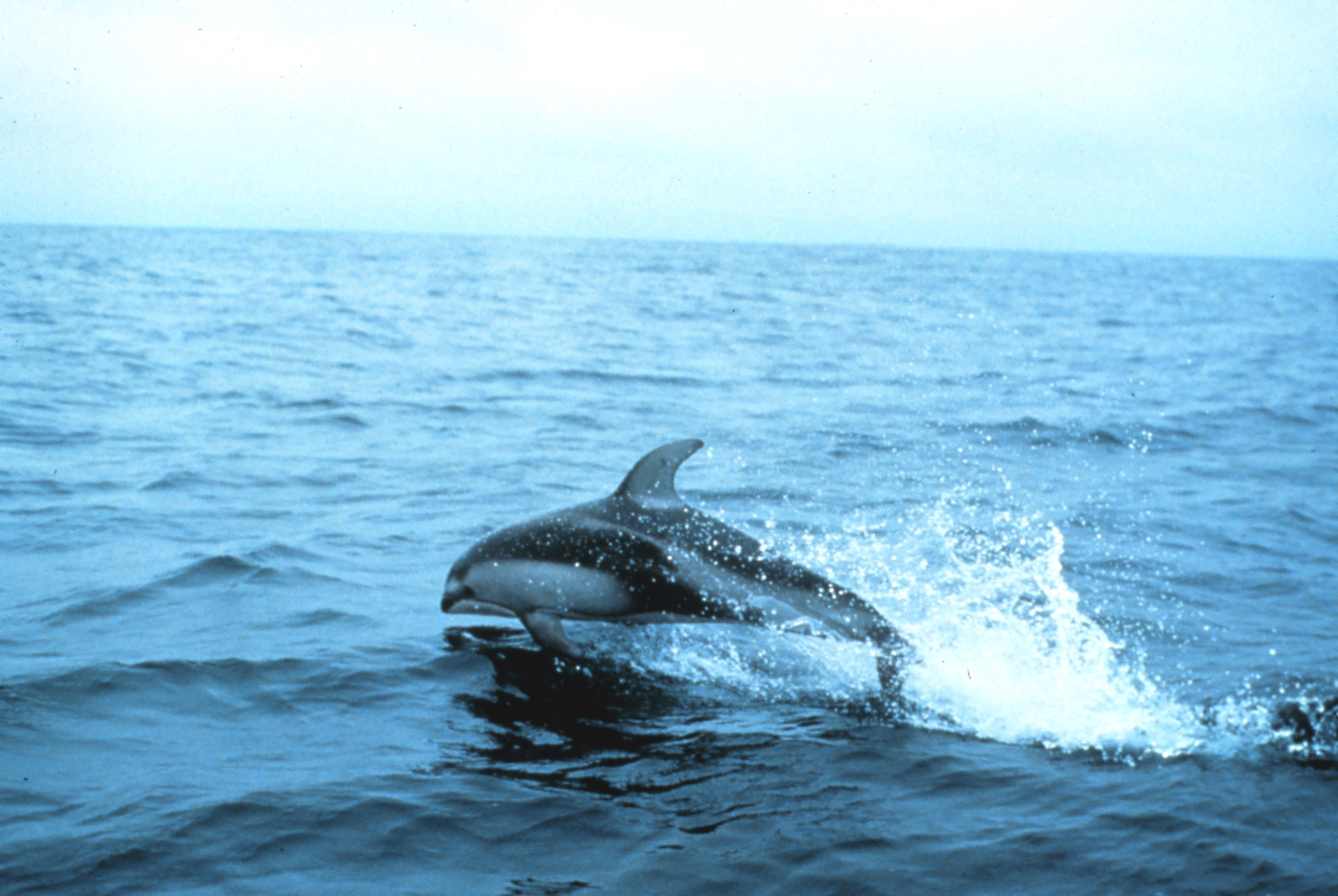
Pacific white-side dolphin (Sagmatias obliquidens) at Gulf of the Farallones National Marine Sanctuary

Gray's Paradox is a paradox posed in 1936 by British zoologist Sir James Gray. The paradox was to figure out how dolphins can obtain such high speeds and accelerations with what appears to be a small muscle mass. Gray made an estimate of the power a dolphin could exert based on its physiology, and concluded the power was insufficient to overcome the drag forces in water. He hypothesized that dolphin skin must have special anti-drag properties.

In 2008, researchers from Rensselaer Polytechnic Institute, West Chester University and the University of California, Santa Cruz used digital particle image velocimetry to prove that Gray's assumptions oversimplified the relationship between muscle power and drag force.

Timothy Wei videotaped two bottlenose dolphins, Primo and Puka, as they swam through a section of water populated with hundreds of thousands of tiny air bubbles. Computer software and force measurement tools developed for aerospace were then used to study the particle-image velocimetry which was captured at 1,000 frames per second (fps). This allowed the team to measure the force exerted by a dolphin. Results showed the dolphin to exert approximately 200 lb of force every time it thrust its tail – 10 times more than Gray hypothesized – and at peak force can exert between 300 and 400 lb.

Wei also used this technique to film dolphins as they were doing tail-stands, a trick where the dolphins “walk” on water by holding most of their bodies vertical above the water while supporting themselves with short, powerful thrusts of their tails.

In 2009, researchers from the National Chung Hsing University in Taiwan introduced new concepts of “kidnapped airfoils” and “circulating horsepower” to explain the swimming capabilities of the swordfish. Swordfish swim at even higher speeds and accelerations than dolphins. The researchers claim their analysis also "solves the perplexity of dolphin’s Gray paradox".

== Gray's flawed assumption ==
The prior research efforts to refute Gray's paradox only looked at the drag reducing aspect of dolphin's skin, but never questioned the basic assumption of Gray "that drag cannot be greater than muscle work" which led to paradox in the first place. In 2014, a team of theoretical mechanical engineers from Northwestern University proved the underlying hypothesis of Gray's paradox wrong. They showed mathematically that drag on undulatory swimmers (such as dolphins) can indeed be greater than the muscle power it generates to propel itself forward, without being paradoxical. They introduced the concept of "energy cascade" to show that during steady swimming all of the generated muscle power is dissipated in the wake of the swimmer (through viscous dissipation). A swimmer uses muscle power to undulate its body, which causes it to experience both drag and thrust simultaneously. Muscle power generated should be equated to power needed to deform the body, rather than equating it to the drag power. On the contrary drag power should be equated to thrust power. This is because during steady swimming, drag and thrust are equal in magnitude but opposite in direction. Their findings can be summarized in a simple power balance equation:

$$\mathbf{P}_{muscle} + \mathbf{P}_{thrust} = \mathbf{P}_{drag} + \mathbf{P}_{deformation}$$

in which,

$$\mathbf{P}_{muscle} = \mathbf{P}_{deformation} \text { and } \mathbf{P}_{thrust} = \mathbf{P}_{drag}$$.

It is important to acknowledge the fact that a swimmer does not have to spend energy to overcome drag all through its muscle work; it is also assisted by the thrust force in this task. Their research also shows that defining drag on the body is definitional and many definitions of drag on the swimming body are prevalent in literature. Some of these definitions can give higher value than the muscle power. However, this does not lead to any paradox because higher drag also means higher thrust in the power balance equation, and this does not violate any energy balance principles.

== Notes ==
- Fish, Frank (2005) A porpoise for power The Journal of Experimental Biology, Classics, 208: 977–978. doi:10.1242/jeb.01513
