= Christiane Timmel =

German chemist

- Born: Christiane Renate Timmel
- Education: TU Dresden; University of Oxford (DPhil)
- Awards: Royal Society University Research Fellowship; Tilden Prize (2020)
- Scientific career
- Fields: Electron Spin Resonance; Magnetoreception
- Workplaces: University of Oxford
- Thesis: Magnetic field effects on radical pair reactions (1998)
- Doctoral advisor: Peter Hore
- Website: timmel.chem.ox.ac.uk

Christiane Renate Timmel is a German chemist who is Director of the Centre for Advanced Electron Spin Resonance at the University of Oxford. Her group make use of electron-spin resonance to understand long-range structures in chemical and biological systems. Timmel was awarded the Tilden Prize on 2020 by the Royal Society of Chemistry for her contributions to electron spin resonance.

== Early life and education ==
Timmel was born in Saxony, Germany. She has said she was inspired to become a scientist by her parents, a mathematician and a chemist. Timmel studied physical chemistry at TU Dresden. After earning her diploma she moved to the University of Oxford, where she worked in the laboratory of Peter Hore. In 1998 she completed her doctoral degree on the effects of magnetic fields on radical pair reactions.

== Research and career ==
After graduating, Timmel was awarded a Royal Society University Research Fellowship at St Hilda's College, Oxford. In 2005 she moved to New College, Oxford where she was promoted to Professor of Chemistry. She has studied the impacts of magnetic fields on chemical interactions. For example, during radical pair mechanism, radicals are generated in a singlet or triplet state, typically by photolysis, due to the conservation of total spin angular momentum. In this reaction, the efficiency of singlet–triplet conversion is known to be impacted by magnetic fields. Timmel has shown that magnetic fields of strengths comparable to that of the Earth's magnetic field can impact the outcome of reactions. In the radical pair mechanism, Timmel has shown that the relative orientation of molecules with respect to an applied magnetic field can impact the reaction kinetics. In an effort to understand bird migration, Timmel has investigated the magnetic field responses of various proteins, including those in the photolyase and the blue-sensitive cryptochrome families.

Alongside her own research, Timmel directs the Centre for Advanced Electron Spin Resonance (CAESR) at the University of Oxford, which she founded in 2007. There she develops low and zero-field equipment for electron-spin resonance, as well as pulsed and continuous-mode spectrometers. Beyond her leadership of CAESR, Timmel chairs the Royal Society of Chemistry Electron Spin Resonance group.

In 2020 Timmel was awarded the Royal Society of Chemistry Tilden Prize for her contributions to electron-spin resonance. In 2026 she was awarded the 2026 Bruker Prize by the Royal Society of Chemistry's ESR Spectroscopy Group for her contributions to electron spin resonance (ESR) spectroscopy and to the fundamental understanding of spin dynamics in chemical and biological systems.

=== Publications ===
Timmel's publications include:

- Chemical Compass Model for Avian Magnetoreception as a Quantum Coherent Device
- Magnetically sensitive light-induced reactions in cryptochrome are consistent with its proposed role as a magnetoreceptor
- Chemical Magnetoreception: Bird Cryptochrome 1a Is Excited by Blue Light and Forms Long-Lived Radical-Pairs

== Personal life ==
Timmel serves as a school governor at New College School in Oxford, where she was formerly a parent.
