= Claire Vallance =

Professor of Physical Chemistry

Claire Vallance is a professor of Physical Chemistry at the University of Oxford, Tutorial Fellow in Physical Chemistry at Hertford College, and past President of the Faraday Division of the Royal Society of Chemistry. In collaboration with professor Mark Brouard and others, she created the PImMS (Pixel Imaging Mass Spectrometry) sensor, used for time-of-flight particle imaging. She is co-founder of the spin-out company Mode Labs, which is developing next-generation chemical sensors based on optical microcavity technology. Vallance's research spans chemical reaction dynamics, optical microcavity spectroscopy, and applications of spectroscopy and imaging in medical diagnostics. She is also an accomplished musician and triathlete.

== Honours and awards ==
- Fellow of the Royal Society of Chemistry, 2016

== Books ==
- Tutorials in Molecular Reaction Dynamics. RSC Press, 2010. (Joint editor with Mark Brouard)
- Astrochemistry: from the Big Bang to the Present Day, World Scientific Press, 2017.
- An Introduction to Chemical Kinetics, Morgan-Claypool Publishing, 2017
- An Introduction to the Gas Phase, Morgan-Claypool Publishing, 2018
