= Jack Baldwin (chemist) =

British chemist (1938–2020)

Sir Jack Baldwin FRS
- Born: Jack Edward Baldwin; 8 August 1938; London, England, U.K
- Died: 5 January 2020 (aged 81)
- Education: Imperial College London
- Known for: Baldwin's rules
- Awards: FRS (1978); Knight Bachelor (1997); Nakanishi Prize (2002)
- Scientific career
- Workplaces: University of Oxford
- Doctoral advisor: Derek Barton
- Doctoral students: John Sutherland
- Website: research.chem.ox.ac.uk/jack-baldwin.aspx

Arms of Sir Jack Baldwin: Argent, on a saltire sable a quatrefoil or

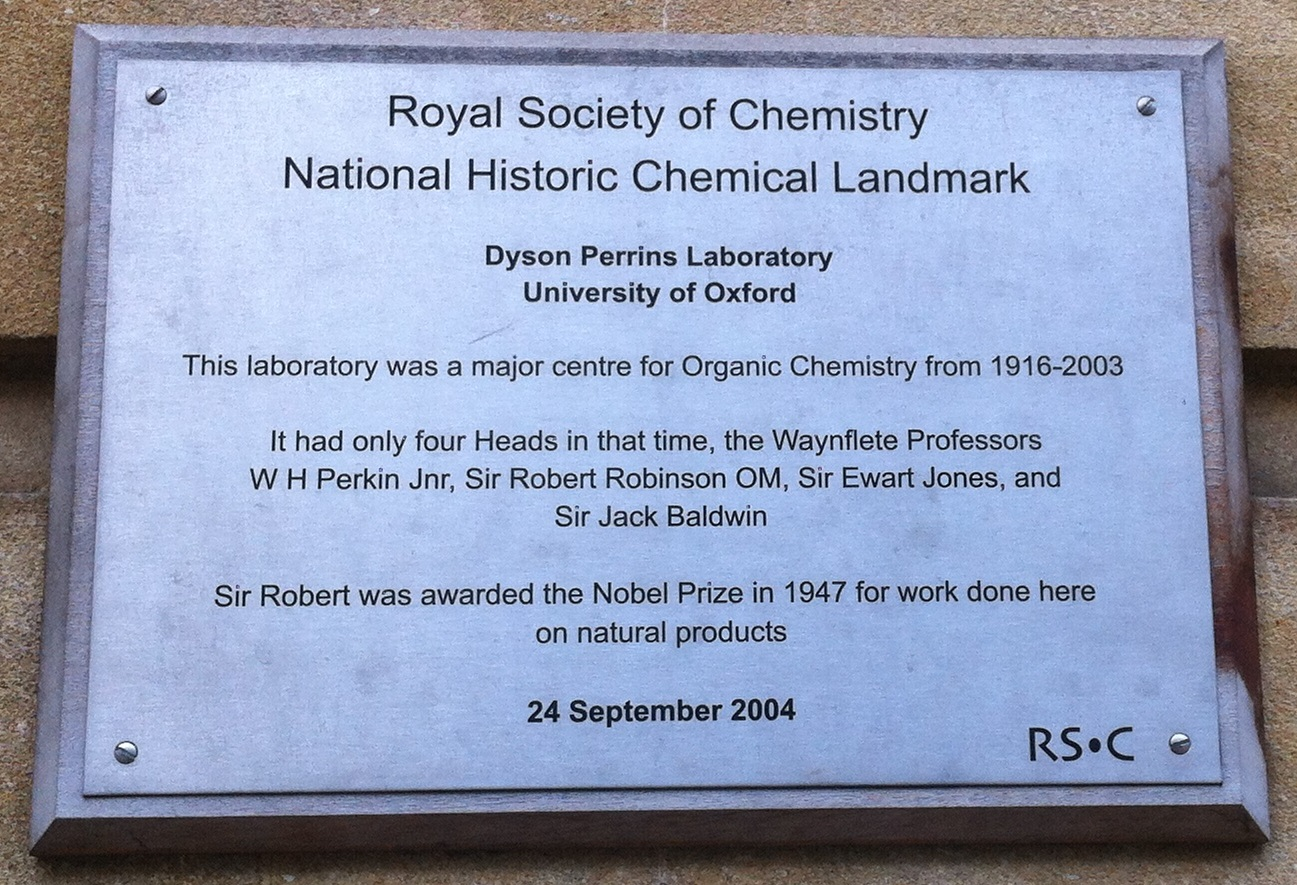
Commemoration plaque for the Dyson Perrins Laboratory, headed by Jack Baldwin in 1978-2003

Sir Jack Edward Baldwin FRS (8 August 1938 – 5 January 2020) was a British chemist. He was a Waynflete Professor of Chemistry at the University of Oxford (1978–2005) and head of the organic chemistry at Oxford.

== Education ==
Baldwin was the second son of Frederick C N Baldwin and Olive F Headland. He was educated at Brighton Grammar School and Lewes County Grammar School. He attended Imperial College, London (BSc, DIC, PhD) and received his Ph.D. working under the direction of Sir Derek H.R. Barton, FRS, Nobel Laureate, who described him as his best student.

== Career and research ==
After four years on the staff at Imperial College, Baldwin moved to the United States: first to Pennsylvania State University in 1967 and then to MIT in 1970, where he published his most significant work — Baldwin's rules for ring closure reactions. It was also where Baldwin met his future wife, Christine Louise Franchi; they married in 1977. In 1978, he moved to Oxford to become head of the Dyson Perrins Laboratory, where he upgraded its facilities and revolutionised the type of work done, while building links between Organic Chemistry and basic biological research. The laboratory formally closed in 2003, but his group moved to the new research facility, the Chemistry Research Laboratory on Mansfield Road.

One of Baldwin's passions was finding out how nature makes chemicals that researchers cannot. This led him to ‘biomimetic’ synthesis: using the principles of nature to improve the generation of biomolecules in the laboratory.

The Baldwin group’s range of interests includes mechanisms of reactions; total synthesis of natural products such as trichoviridin, acromelic acid A, hypoglycin A and lactacystin; and biomimetic synthesis of natural products such as (-)-xestospongin A. Baldwin published over 700 papers.

Georgina Ferry's obituary of Baldwin notes that "he had little time for the academic conventions of Oxford: he spoke his mind." and that "he enjoyed good food, fine wine, powerful motorbikes, fast cars and his dogs." Some of these aspects of his character are illustrated in a three-part documentary.

=== Some positions held ===
Derived from Who's Who 2020.

- 1963 Assistant Lecturer in Chemistry, Imperial College
- 1966 Lecturer
- 1967 Assistant Professor of Chemistry, Penn State
- 1969 Associate Professor
- 1969-70 Alfred P. Sloan Fellow
- 1970 Associate Professor of Chemistry
- 1972 Daniell Professor of Chemistry, King’s College, London
- 1972-78 Professor of Chemistry, MIT

=== Awards and honours ===
- 1975 Corday Morgan Medal and Prize, Chemical Society
- 1978 Elected a Fellow of the Royal Society
- 1984 Paul Karrer Gold Medal at the University of Zurich
- 1987 Hugo Müller Medal, Royal Society of Chemistry
- 1987 Max Tishler Award, Harvard University
- 1988 Dr Paul Jansen Prize for Creativity in Organic Synthesis, Belgium
- 1993 Davy Medal
- 1994 Elected a Foreign Honorary Member of the American Academy of Arts and Sciences.
- 1997 Invested as a Knight Bachelor
- 1999 Leverhulme Medal (Royal Society)
- 2002 Nakanishi Prize
- 2006 Paracelsus Prize
