= Ewart Jones =

Welsh chemist (1911–2002)

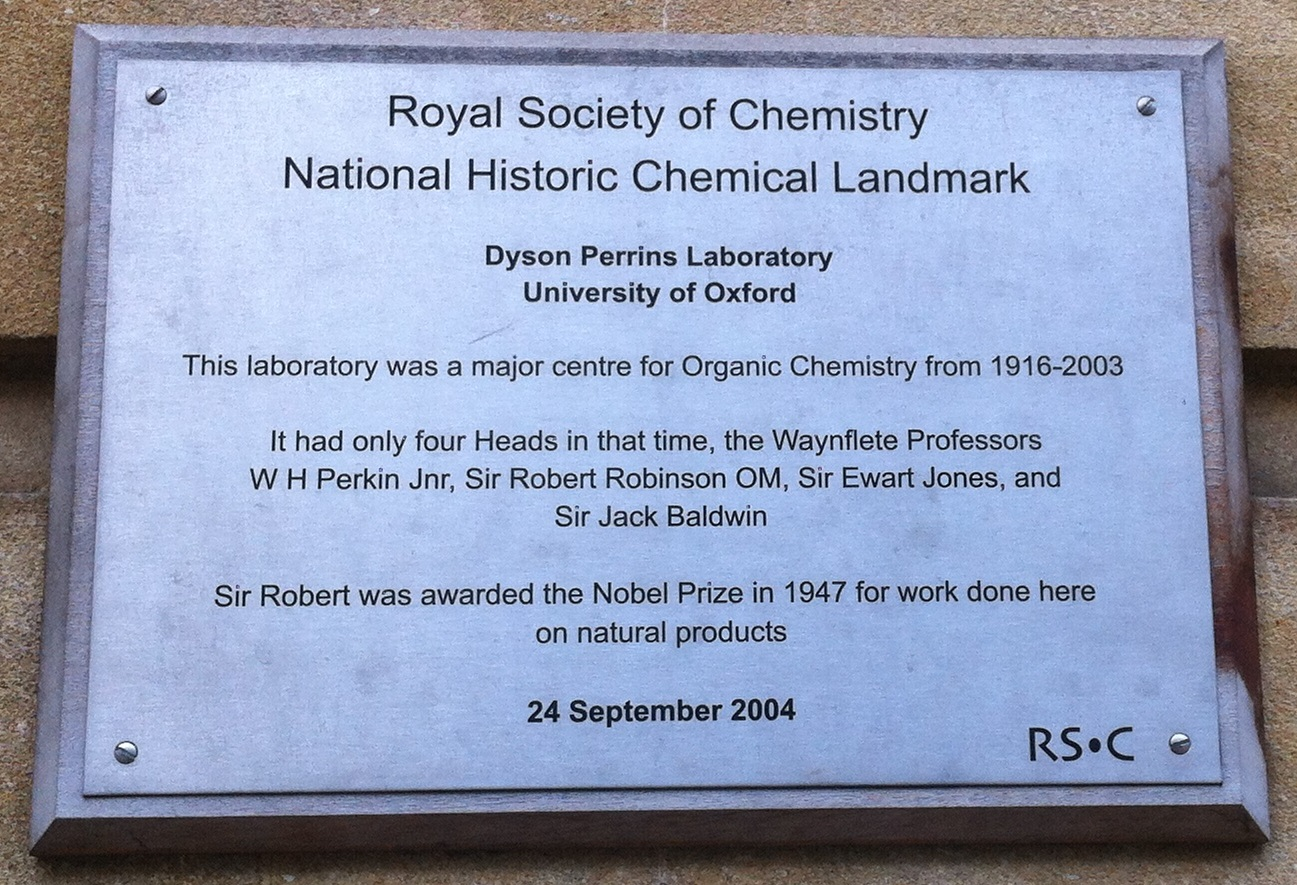
Commemoration plaque for the Dyson Perrins Laboratory, headed by Ewart Jones between 1954-1978

Sir Ewart Ray Herbert Jones FRS (16 March 1911 – 7 May 2002) was a Welsh organic chemist and academic administrator, whose fields of expertise led him to discoveries into the chemistry of natural products, mainly steroids, terpenes and vitamins. His work also led to the creation of the Jones oxidation.

== Personal life ==
Jones was born in Wrexham in 1911, and grew up in the small village of Rhostyllen, Wales with his evangelical family. Between July 1924 and March 1927, his sister died of tuberculosis, his grandmother died and his father drowned himself. He attended Grove Park School in Wrexham, Wales and then entered the University College of North Wales, Bangor in 1929, hoping to concentrate on physics, but gained an honours degree in 1932 in Chemistry instead. He was invited to stay at the University by the head of the department, J. L. Simonsen, and stayed there for two years.

== Family ==
In 1937, he married Frances Copp, whom he had met during their studies in Bangor. They had 3 children, 2 daughters and 1 son.

== Career ==
In 1938, he became a lecturer at Imperial College of Science and Technology, London. In 1940, he was awarded the Meldola Medal and Prize by the Royal Society of Chemistry. During World War II, he trained gas officers and after the war returned to Imperial College as Reader and Assistant Professor.

In 1947, at the age of thirty-six, he accepted the Sir Samuel Hall Chair of Chemistry at the University of Manchester and was elected to membership of the Manchester Literary and Philosophical Society on 1 January 1954. After experimenting with different reagents, he discovered the Jones oxidation (chromic acid oxidation of secondary alcohols to ketones in acetone). After joining the Heilbron group in Manchester, Jones was introduced to acetylene chemistry which eventually led to his work with vitamin A. Later in life, he worked with the Halsall group, specifically with the hydroxypropanone molecule.

In 1954, he was appointed Waynflete Professor of Organic Chemistry and head of the Dyson Perrins Laboratory at the University of Oxford, a position he held until 1978.

== Honours and awards ==
He was elected a Fellow of the Royal Society in 1950 and was knighted in 1963. He served as president of the Chemical Society (1964–1966), President of the Royal Institute of Chemistry (1970–1971) and the first President of the Royal Society of Chemistry (1980–1982). He won the Royal Society Davy Medal in 1966 "in recognition of his distinguished contributions to synthetic organic chemistry and to the elucidation of the structures of natural products".
