= Robert K. Thomas (chemist) =

British chemist (born 1941)

Robert Kemeys Thomas FRS (born 25 September 1941), also known as Bob Thomas, is a physical chemist working in the Physical and Theoretical Chemistry Laboratory (PTCL) at the University of Oxford.

== Early life and education ==
He was born in Harpenden, the son of the Rev. Herbert Samuel Griffiths Thomas MC and Dr Agnes Paterson Thomas (née McLaren). He was educated at St John's College, Oxford.

== Career and research ==
He is a fellow of University College, Oxford. He works in the field of soft condensed matter and is a pioneer in the development of neutron scattering and reflectivity techniques. He was elected a Fellow of the Royal Society in 1998.

- Surfaces and Interfaces Award (2010)

== Personal life ==
He married Pamela Woods in 1968. They have three children.
