= John McGrady =

English cricketer, chemist, academic

Personal information
- Full name: John Ewart McGrady
- Born: 30 April 1968 (age 58); Ryton, County Durham, England
- Batting: Right-handed
- Role: Wicket-keeper

Domestic team information
- Years: Team
- 1990: Oxford University

Career statistics
Competition	First-class
Matches	6
Runs scored	15
Batting average	7.50
100s/50s	0/0
Top score	14
Catches/stumpings	0/2
- Source: Cricinfo, 10 June 2020

John Ewart McGrady (born 30 April 1968) is an English chemist and academic who previously played first-class cricket while a student at the University of Oxford.

The son of the cricket administrator and minor counties cricketer Albert McGrady, he was born in April 1968 at Ryton, County Durham. He later read chemistry at St Catherine's College, Oxford. While studying at Oxford, McGrady played first-class cricket for Oxford University in 1990, making six appearances. Playing as a wicket-keeper, he scored 15 runs in these matches and made two stumpings.

From Oxford, he studied for his doctorate in Australia at the Australian National University. He became a chemistry lecturer at the University of York in 1997, before lecturing at the University of Glasgow in 2006. In 2009 he returned to the University of Oxford, becoming a fellow at New College.
