= Peter Hore (chemist) =

Biophysical chemist

Peter Hore FRS
- Born: Peter John Hore
- Education: University of Oxford (BA, DPhil)
- Spouse: Julia Yeomans (m. 1990)
- Scientific career
- Workplaces: University of Oxford; University of Groningen
- Thesis: Electron spin resonance studies of transient species (1980)
- Doctoral advisor: Keith McLauchlan
- Doctoral students: Jonathan A. Jones; Ilya Kuprov; Christiane Timmel
- Website: hore.chem.ox.ac.uk

Peter John Hore FRS is a British chemist and academic. He is a Professor of Chemistry at the University of Oxford and fellow of Corpus Christi College, Oxford. He is the author of two Oxford Chemistry Primers (OCP 32 and 92) on Nuclear Magnetic Resonance (NMR) and research articles primarily in the area of NMR, electron paramagnetic resonance (EPR), spin chemistry and magnetoreception during bird migration.

== Education ==
Hore was educated at the University of Oxford where he was an undergraduate and graduate student of St John's College, Oxford, from 1973 to 1980. His Doctor of Philosophy degree was supervised by Keith McLauchlan.

== Career and research ==
Hore was a Royal Society research fellow at the University of Groningen from 1980 to 1982, and a junior research fellow at St John's from 1982 to 1983 before be appointed a Fellow and tutor at Corpus Christi College, Oxford. He was elected a Fellow of the Royal Society (FRS) in 2022.

== Personal life ==
Hore married theoretical physicist Julia Yeomans in 1990.
