= Cyril N. Hinshelwood =

British Nobel laureate and chemist (1897–1967)

Sir Cyril N. Hinshelwood OM FRS
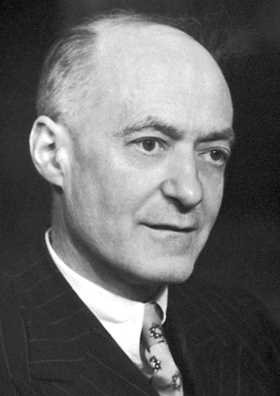
- Born: Cyril Norman Hinshelwood; 19 June 1897; London, England
- Died: 9 October 1967 (aged 70); London, England
- Education: University of Oxford
- Known for: Chemical kinetics Chemical reaction network theory Langmuir–Hinshelwood mechanism Lindemann–Hinshelwood mechanism
- Awards: Meldola Medal and Prize (1923); Liversidge Award (1939); Davy Medal (1942); Royal Medal (1947); Longstaff Prize (1948); Faraday Lectureship Prize (1953); Nobel Prize in Chemistry (1956); Leverhulme Medal 1960); Copley Medal (1962); Dalton Medal (1966)
- Scientific career
- Fields: Physical chemistry
- Workplaces: University of Oxford; Imperial College London
- Doctoral advisor: Harold Hartley
- Doctoral students: Sydney Brenner; Alan Eddy; John E. M. Midgley
- Other notable students: Keith J. Laidler (postdoc)

Sir Cyril Norman Hinshelwood OM FRS (19 June 1897 – 9 October 1967) was a British physical chemist and expert in chemical kinetics. His work in reaction mechanisms earned the 1956 Nobel Prize in chemistry.

== Education ==
Born in London, his parents were Norman Macmillan Hinshelwood, a chartered accountant, and Ethel Frances née Smith. He was educated first in Canada, returning in 1905 on the death of his father to a flat in Chelsea where he lived for the rest of his life. He was educated at Westminster City School and Balliol College, Oxford.

== Career ==
During the First World War, Hinshelwood was a chemist in an explosives factory. He was a tutor in Trinity College, Oxford, from 1921 to 1937 and was Dr Lee's Professor of Chemistry in the University of Oxford from 1937. He served on several advisory councils on scientific matters to the British Government.

His early studies of molecular kinetics led to the publication of Thermodynamics for Students of Chemistry and The Kinetics of Chemical Change in 1926. With Harold Warris Thompson he studied the explosive reaction of hydrogen and oxygen and described the phenomenon of chain reaction. His subsequent work on chemical changes in the bacterial cell proved to be of great importance in later research work on antibiotics and therapeutic agents, and his book, The Chemical Kinetics of the Bacterial Cell was published in 1946, followed by Growth, Function and Regulation in Bacterial Cells in 1966. In 1951 he published The Structure of Physical Chemistry. It was republished as an Oxford Classic Texts in the Physical Sciences by Oxford University Press in 2005.

The Langmuir-Hinshelwood process in heterogeneous catalysis, in which the adsorption of the reactants on the surface is the rate-limiting step, is named after him. He was a senior research fellow at Imperial College London from 1964 to 1967.

== Awards and honours ==
In addition to being named the second Dr. Lee's Professor of Chemistry at Oxford, Hinshelwood was elected Fellow of the Royal Society (FRS) in 1929, serving as president from 1955 to 1960. He was knighted in 1948 and appointed to the Order of Merit in 1960. With Nikolay Semenov of the USSR, Hinshelwood was jointly awarded the Nobel Prize in Chemistry in 1956 for his researches into the mechanism of chemical reactions. He was also an elected member of the American Academy of Arts and Sciences, the United States National Academy of Sciences, and the American Philosophical Society.

Hinshelwood was president of the Chemical Society, the Royal Society, the Classical Association, and the Faraday Society, and received numerous awards and honorary degrees. He was elected on 1 January 1960 to honorary membership of the Manchester Literary and Philosophical Society who awarded him its Dalton medal in 1966.

== Personal life ==
Hinshelwood never married. He was fluent in seven classical and modern languages and his main hobbies were painting, collecting Chinese pottery, and foreign literature. As an artist, Hinshelwood painted scenes in Oxford, as well as portraits of Oxford University people including Harold Hartley, his doctoral supervisor, and Herbert Blakiston, the President of Trinity College. The portrait of Hartley is now owned by the Royal Society, and that of Blakiston is owned by Trinity College, as are a number of Hinshelwood's other paintings.

He died, at home, on 9 October 1967. In 1968, his Nobel Prize medal was sold by his estate to a collector, who then sold it in 1976 for $15,000. In 2017, the medal was sold at auction for $128,000.

== See also ==
- Balliol-Trinity Laboratories
- List of presidents of the Royal Society

Professional and academic associations
Preceded by Lord Adrian	50th President of the Royal Society; 1955–1960	Succeeded by Howard Florey
