= Dyson Perrins Laboratory =

Science labs at University of Oxford

Coordinates: 51.7584°N 1.2537°W

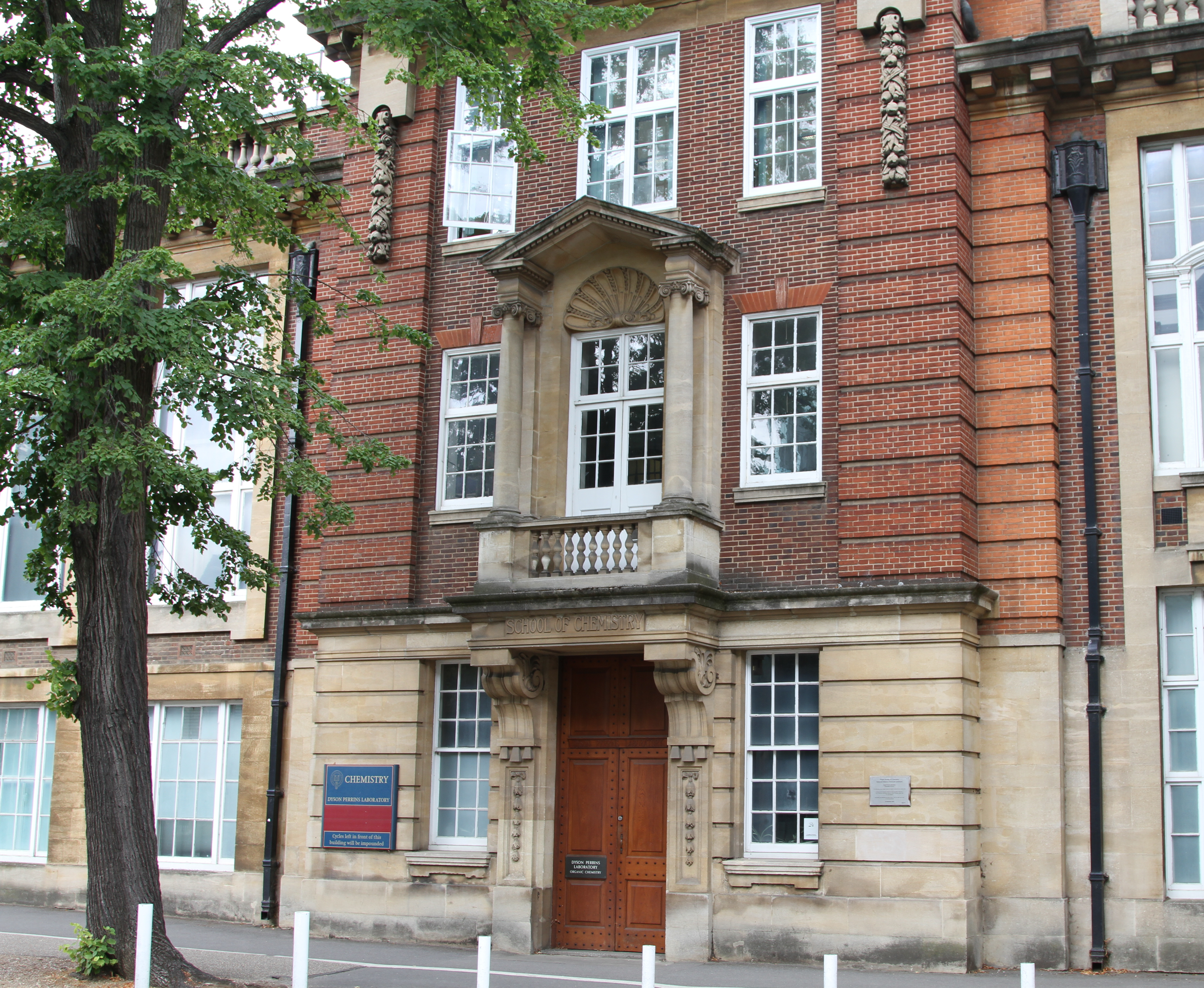
The entrance

The Dyson Perrins Laboratory is in the science area of the University of Oxford and was the main centre for research into organic chemistry of the University from its foundation in 1916 until its closure as a research laboratory in 2003. Until 2018, parts of the building were used as teaching laboratories in which undergraduate students were trained in practical organic chemistry.

It was founded with an endowment from Charles Dyson Perrins, heir to the Lea & Perrins Worcestershire sauce company, and stands on the north side of South Parks Road in Oxford.

== Notable chemists ==
The heads of the laboratory were the four consecutive Waynflete Professors of Chemistry:

1. William Henry Perkin, Jr., from 1912 to 1929;
2. Sir Robert Robinson, from 1930 to 1954. Nobel Prize winner, 1947;
3. Sir Ewart Jones, from 1954 to 1978;
4. Sir Jack Baldwin, from 1978 to 2003.

During its 87-year working life, the laboratory had an extremely distinguished career; it can claim a stake in shaping the scientific careers of three Nobel Laureates, namely Lord Todd (1957), Sir John W. Cornforth (1975) and Richard Robson (2025), who passed their formative years as young chemists in the laboratories.

== History and present use ==
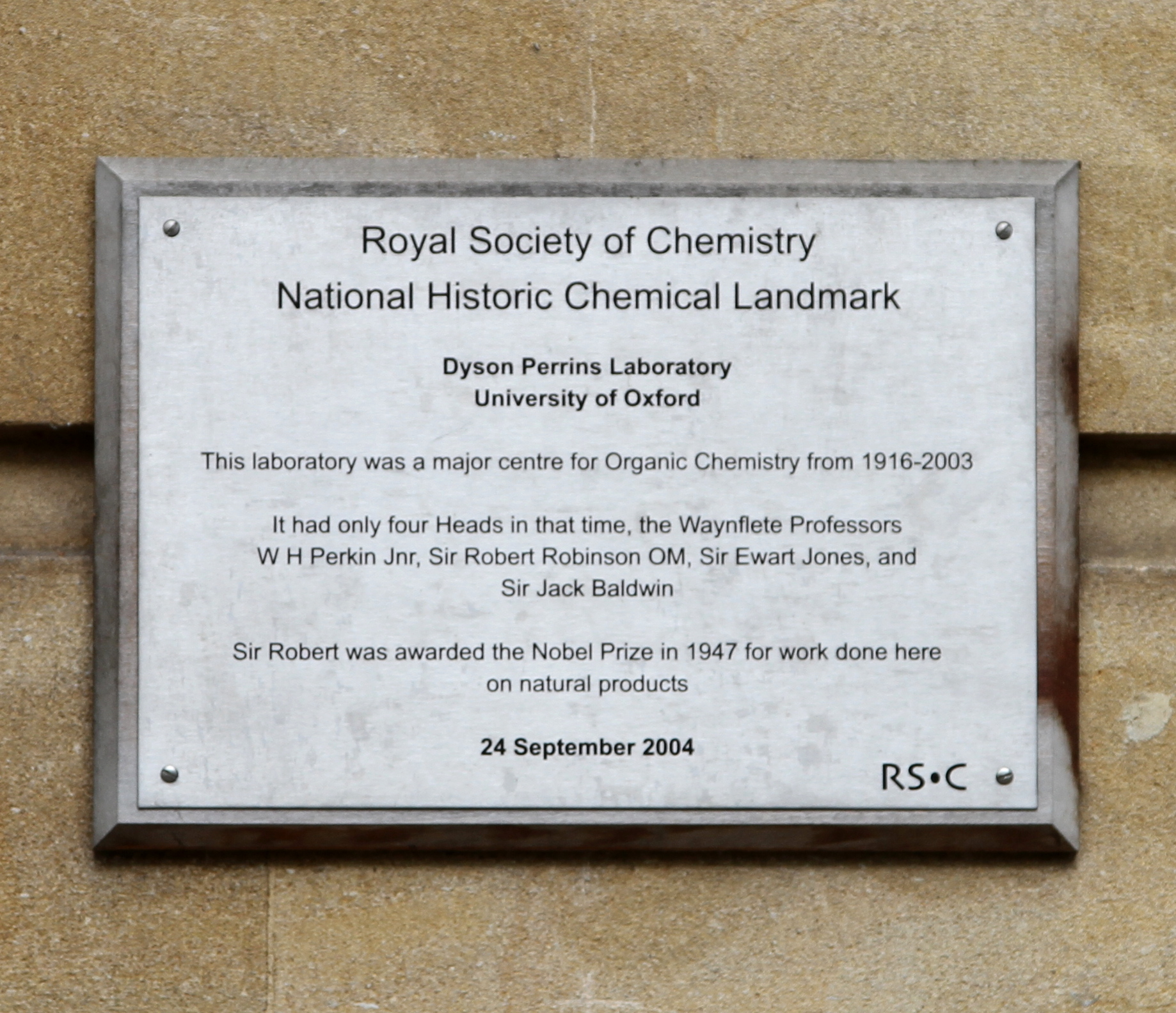
The Royal Society of Chemistry commemorative plaque, 2004

The building of the laboratory began in 1913 and was finished in 1916 to the designs of Paul Waterhouse, the contractors being Armitage and Hodgson of Leeds. Funding came in part from C. W. Dyson Perrins of Queen's College. In 1920–22 an eastern wing was added as contemplated in the original design, this was followed in 1934 by an extension for medical students and in 1940–41 a new brick wing to the north was built.

Research in organic chemistry at Oxford is now conducted across South Parks Road at the University's state-of-the-art Chemistry Research Laboratory. The majority of the building has been handed over to the Oxford University Geography Department for the establishment of the Oxford University Centre for the Environment (OUCE).
