= Chemistry Research Laboratory, University of Oxford =

Research facility at the University of Oxford in England

Coordinates: 51.7582°N 1.2531°W

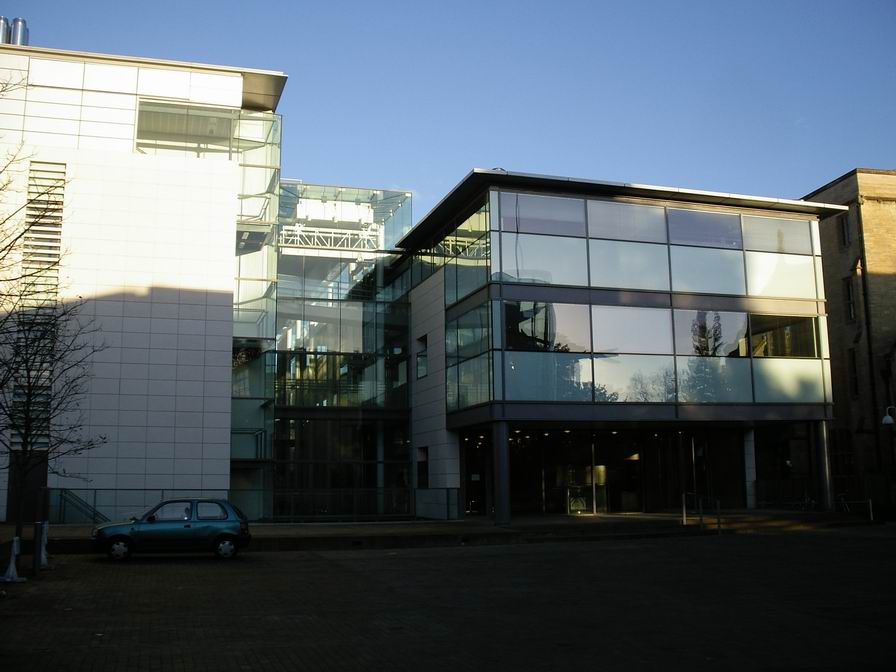
Entrance to the Chemistry Research Laboratory

Location of the Chemistry Research Laboratory within central Oxford

Chemistry Research Laboratory is a facility at the University of Oxford in England. It is part of the Department of Chemistry in the university.

The building is split into two parts, with the southern side housed by staff and the northern side hosting laboratories. A canteen divides the two and can be crossed via bridges.

== See also ==
- Department of Chemistry, University of Oxford
