= Marker degradation =

Synthetic route in steroid chemistry

The Marker degradation is a three-step synthetic route in steroid chemistry developed by American chemist Russell Earl Marker in 1938–1940. It is used for the production of cortisone and mammalian sex hormones (progesterone, estradiol, etc.) from plant steroids, and established Mexico as a world center for steroid production in the years immediately after World War II. The discovery of the Marker degradation allowed the production of substantial quantities of steroid hormones for the first time, and was fundamental in the development of the contraceptive pill and corticosteroid anti-inflammatory drugs. In 1999, the American Chemical Society and the Sociedad Química de México named the route as an International Historic Chemical Landmark.

The first large-scale application of the route took place in 1943, when Russell Earl Marker collected 10 tons of yam tubers to synthesize 3 kilograms (6.6 lb) of progesterone, which was the largest single amount of progesterone that had been produced by that time. That single batch had a value of US$240,000 (approximately $3 million in 2009) at the time it was synthesized.

The discovery of the Marker degradation led to the development of a fine chemical industry in Mexico which, starting from scratch and in less than ten years, supplied more than half the human sex hormones sold in the United States. The booming industry caused a huge expansion in chemical education in Mexico.

== Early development ==
Marker's research at Pennsylvania State College (now Pennsylvania State University) was directed towards finding synthetic routes to steroid hormones from "relatively inexpensive starting materials". While working on a series of plant steroids called sapogenins, he realized that the structure of the side chain (Note: Steroids are characterized by four fused rings of carbon atoms (three six-membered rings and one five-membered ring). Many steroids also have a "side chain" of carbon atoms, usually attached to the five-membered ring.) of one of the compounds, sarsasapogenin, had been incorrectly described in the literature: rather than having an unreactive "double-tetrahydrofuran" side chain, it actually had a much more reactive "ketone spiro acetal" side chain. While the ketone spiro acetal was unreactive in basic or neutral conditions, it could be degraded under acidic conditions: indeed, Marker described it as "unusually reactive". In showing the true nature of the sarsasapogenin side chain, Marker had discovered the first of the steps in what would become known as the Marker degradation.

Sarsasapogenin was too expensive to be a commercial precursor to other steroids, so Marker set about looking for richer sources of sapogenins which were more closely related to progesterone. He identified one candidate in Trillium erectum ("Beth root" or "Wake-robin"), a sapogenin called diosgenin which had previously been found in Japanese yams (Dioscorea tokoro). Marker showed that both sarsasapogenin and diosgenin could be converted into both progesterone and other steroid hormones. (Note: Although it wasn't known at the time, the use of progesterone as a precursor for other steroid hormones closely mimics the biosynthetic pathway. Human males synthesize progesterone as a precursor to testosterone, and human females synthesize testosterone as a precursor to the various estrogens. Cortisone is also synthesized from progesterone in the human body, as in the industrial process developed after the discovery of the Marker degradation.) The quantities of diosgenin that could be extracted from T. erectum were still unsatisfactory, so Marker looked for richer sources. He eventually hit upon another species of Dioscorea, a Mexican yam known locally as cabeza de negro, (Note: Not to be confused with the fruit known as cabeza de negro (Annona purpurea).) whose tubers were reported to grow up to 100 kg (220 lbs) in weight.

== Route from diosgenin ==
As with much steroid chemistry, the Marker degradation relies heavily on kinetic control to degrade the sapogenin side chain while leaving similar functional groups on the steroid nucleus (relatively) unaffected.

The first step is the reaction that led Marker to discover that the sapogenins had a ketone spiro acetal structure in their side chain. Acetals are inert in basic conditions, but can be hydrolysed in acidic conditions. Marker uses acetic anhydride to block the hydroxyl group formed by opening the six-membered pyran ring.

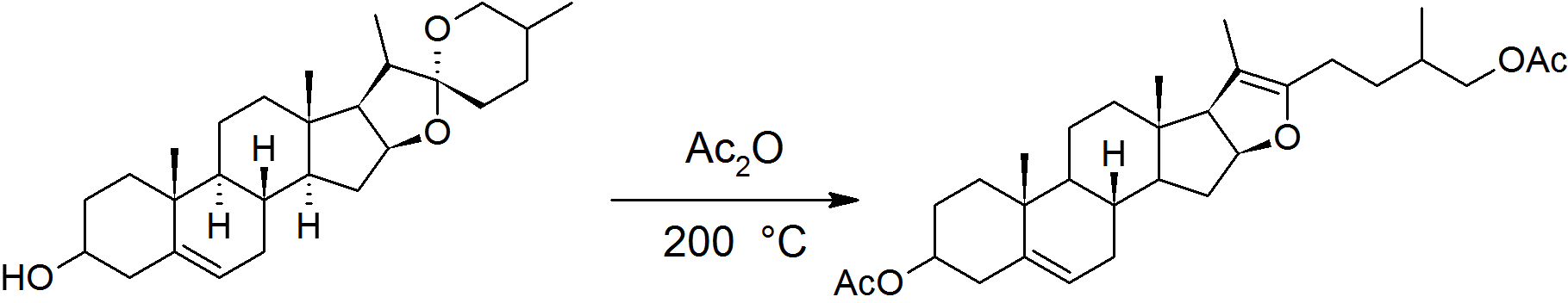

The five-membered furan ring is then oxidatively opened with chromium trioxide. This forms the acetyl side chain of progesterone and an esterified hydroxyl group on the steroid nucleus.

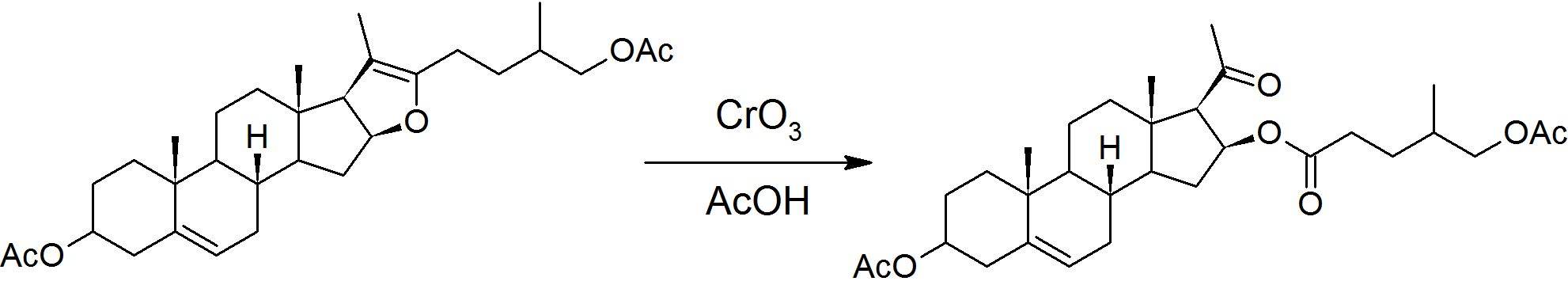

The ester is then hydrolyzed under strongly basic conditions. The use of ethanolic sodium hydroxide leads to the elimination of water to form a double bond.

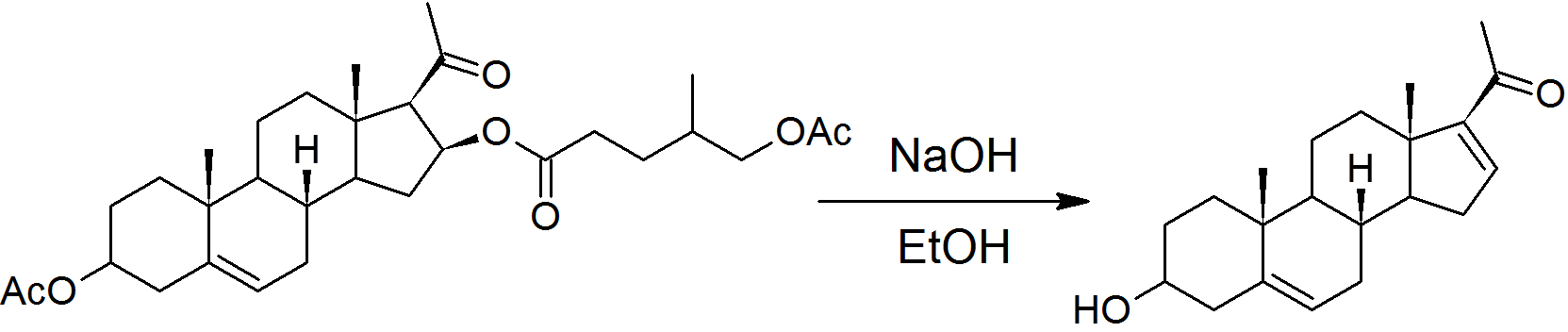

The result in this 1939 version of Marker degradation is 16-dehydropregnenolone (3-hydroxypregna-5,16-dien-20-one, 16-DP). In 1940, the final hydrolysis step was changed to use acetic acid, producing the more familiar 16-dehydropregnenolone acetate (16-DPA).

=== Downstream products ===
16-DP can be converted into progesterone in two steps. Firstly, the double bond in ring D is hydrogenated, followed by Oppenauer oxidation of the hydroxyl group and the concurrent migration of the remaining olefin from ring B to ring A so that it is in conjugation with the ketone carbonyl group at position 3. Alternatively, a three-step procedure involving Br_{2}, CrO_{3}, and Zn/HOAc is used.

The 16-DP can also be converted into testosterone and the downstream products estrone and estradiol.

== Mexican steroid industry ==
Marker's early developmental work was supported by Parke-Davis, a leading American pharmaceutical company now part of Pfizer. However, Marker realized that it made more sense commercially to produce steroids in Mexico, near to the raw material (Mexican Dioscorea sp.; D. composita would come to be the preferred species), than to ship the tubers back to the United States. Parke-Davis did not believe that it was scientifically feasible to operate a fine chemicals production facility in Mexico, and the collaboration foundered. Instead, Marker decided to look for Mexican partners himself, and resigned his academic post on December 1, 1943. One consequence of this split was that the Marker degradation was never patented.

Marker set up the Mexican company Syntex (Note: Now part of Hoffmann-La Roche.) in early 1944 in association with two Mexican investors, Emeric Somlo and Federico Lehmann. Marker is said to have partly paid for his 40% stake in Syntex with progesterone, then valued at about $80/gram. Within the year, Syntex was selling progesterone for $50/gram. However Marker split with his partners in May 1945 in a row over profits, and set up a new company called Botanica-mex, which would later be sold to Gedeon Richter Ltd. and renamed Hormonosynth (later Diosynth).

The difficulties in fine chemicals manufacture in Mexico were indeed considerable: there was a severe shortage of trained chemists and indeed no doctoral program in chemistry at any Mexican university. When Marker left Syntex, his associates found no instructions for the production process and reagent bottles labeled in code. They hired George Rosenkranz, a Hungarian organic chemist trained at ETH Zurich (the Swiss Federal Institute of Technology) who had been stranded in Cuba by the entry of the United States into World War II, to replace Marker. Rosenkranz would have to virtually reinvent the production process for progesterone from diosgenin: he also established an Institute of Chemistry at the National Autonomous University of Mexico, where one of the first research students was Luis E. Miramontes, later to become a pivotal researcher at Syntex.

Rosenkranz also hired foreign talent for Syntex, including the Austrian Jewish refugee (and naturalized American) Carl Djerassi and the Uruguayan Alejandro Zaffaroni. In 1951, Djerassi, Miramontes and Rosencranz synthesized norethisterone at Syntex, the first orally active progesterone analog and a vital ingredient of the first oral contraceptive pills. By this time, Syntex and its Mexican competitors (including Percy Lavon Julian, the first African-American chemist inducted into the U.S. National Academy of Sciences) were supplying more than half the human sex hormones sold in the United States, (Note: The availability of (relatively) cheap progesterone in (relatively) large quantities created a market, and had the effect of spurring other manufacturers to improve their production processes for steroid hormones: this is best seen in the case of cortisone, where Merck's original 36-step synthesis from ox bile was improved to remain competitive with cortisone prepared from Mexican yams.) and the price of progesterone had dropped to $2/gram. Fortune ran a story that same year (1951) headlined "Syntex makes the biggest technological boom ever heard south of the border": by 1999, and with the benefit of hindsight, this was considered to be an understatement by the American Chemical Society, not least because of the truly global impact of the Syntex production and research. The impact of the Syntex research can be seen from in the authoritative 1959 monograph Steroids by Louis and Mary Fieser: Syntex accounted for 30% of all papers cited from industrial laboratories. In 1959, Syntex redomesticated itself as a Panama corporation and relocated its headquarters to Palo Alto, California, United States.
