= Percy Lavon Julian =

American research chemist (1899–1975)

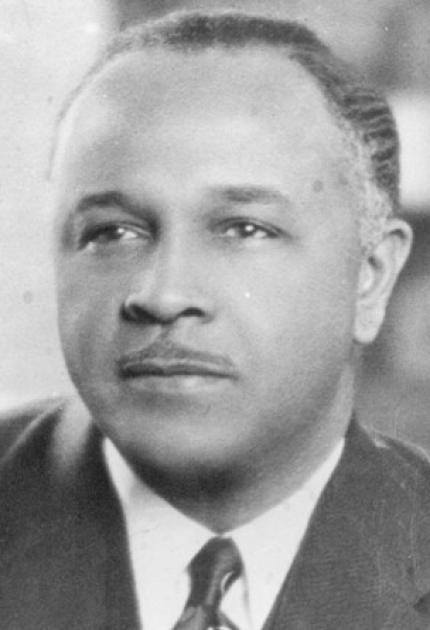
- Julian c. 1940–1968
- Born: April 11, 1899; Montgomery, Alabama, U.S.
- Died: April 19, 1975 (aged 76); Waukegan, Illinois, U.S.
- Education: DePauw University (B.A.); Harvard University (M.S.); University of Vienna (Ph.D)
- Occupation: Chemist
- Spouse: Anna R. Johnson (m. 1935)
- Children: 2
- Scientific career
- Fields: Chemistry
- Workplaces: Howard University
- Doctoral advisor: Ernst Späth

Percy Lavon Julian (April 11, 1899 – April 19, 1975) was an American research chemist and a pioneer in the chemical synthesis of medicinal drugs from plants. Julian was the first person to synthesize the natural product physostigmine, and a pioneer in industrial large-scale chemical synthesis of the human hormones progesterone and testosterone from plant sterols such as stigmasterol and sitosterol. His work laid the foundation for the steroid drug industry's production of cortisone, other corticosteroids, and artificial hormones that led to birth control pills.

Julian started his own company to synthesize steroid intermediates from wild Mexican yams. His work helped to greatly reduce the cost of steroid intermediates to large multinational pharmaceutical companies. This significantly expanded the use of several important drugs, including synthetic cortisone. Julian was one of the first African Americans to be allowed to earn a doctorate in chemistry. He was the first African-American chemist inducted into the National Academy of Sciences, and the second African-American scientist, after David Blackwell, inducted into the organization from any field. Throughout his career, Julian received over 130 patents.

== Early life and family ==
Percy Lavon Julian was born on April 11, 1899, in Montgomery, Alabama, as the first child of six born to James Sumner Julian and Elizabeth Lena Adams Julian. Both of his parents were graduates of what was to be Alabama State University. His father was employed as a clerk in the Railway Service of the United States Post Office, and his mother was a school teacher.

== Education and achievements ==
At a time when access to an education beyond the eighth grade was extremely rare for African Americans, Julian's parents steered all of their children toward higher education. Julian attended DePauw University in Greencastle, Indiana. The college accepted few African-American students. The segregated nature of the town subjected him to social humiliations. He was not allowed to live in a college dormitory and first stayed in an off-campus boarding home, which refused to serve him meals. It took him days before he found an establishment where he could eat. He later found work firing the furnace, waiting tables, and doing other odd jobs in a fraternity house; in return, he was allowed to sleep in the attic and eat at the house. Julian graduated from DePauw in 1920 as a Phi Beta Kappa and valedictorian.

By 1930, his father had moved the family to Greencastle so that all his children could attend DePauw. He still worked as a railroad postal clerk. James owned his own home; his house, worth $3,000 in 1930, was worth about $58,000 in 2025. After graduating from DePauw, Julian wanted to obtain his doctorate in chemistry, but learned it would be difficult for an African American to do so. Instead, he obtained a position as a chemistry instructor at Fisk University. In 1923 he received an Austin Fellowship in Chemistry, which allowed him to attend Harvard University to obtain his M.S. However, worried that white students would resent being taught by an African American, Harvard withdrew Julian's teaching assistantship, making it impossible for him to complete his Ph.D. there.

In 1929, while an instructor at Howard University, Julian received a Rockefeller Foundation fellowship to continue his graduate work at the University of Vienna, where he earned his Ph.D. in 1931. He studied under Ernst Späth and was considered an impressive student. Europe gave him freedom from the racial prejudices that had stifled him in the States. He freely participated in intellectual social gatherings, attended the opera, and found greater acceptance among his peers. Julian was one of the first African Americans to receive a Ph.D. in chemistry, after St. Elmo Brady and Edward M.A. Chandler.

After returning from Vienna, Julian taught for one year at Howard University. At Howard, in part due to his position as a department head, Julian became caught up in university politics, setting off a chain of scandals. At university president Mordecai Wyatt Johnson's request, he goaded white professor of chemistry Jacob Shohan (Ph.D., Harvard), into resigning. In late May 1932, Shohan retaliated by releasing to the local African-American newspaper the letters Julian had written to him from Vienna. The letters described "a variety of subjects from wine, pretty Viennese women, music and dances, to chemical experiments and plans for the new chemical building." In the letters, he spoke with familiarity, and some derision, of members of the Howard University faculty, calling one well-known dean an "ass (also known as a donkey)".

Around this same time, Julian also became entangled in an interpersonal conflict with his laboratory assistant, Robert Thompson. Julian had recommended Thompson for dismissal in March 1932. Thompson sued Julian for "alienating the affections of his wife", Anna Roselle Thompson, stating he had seen them together in a sexual tryst. Julian counter-sued him for libel. When Thompson was fired, he too gave the paper intimate and personal letters which Julian had written to him from Vienna. Julian's letters revealed "how he fooled the [Howard] president into accepting his plans for the chemistry building" and "how he bluffed his good friend into appointing" a professor of Julian's liking. Through the summer of 1932, the Baltimore Afro-American published all of Julian's letters. Eventually, the scandal and accompanying pressure forced Julian to resign.

At the lowest point in Julian's career, his former mentor, William Martin Blanchard, a professor of chemistry at DePauw, provided him with much-needed assistance, by offering Julian a position to teach organic chemistry at DePauw in 1932. He received support from the Rosenwald Fund to teach at DePauw. Julian then helped Josef Pikl, a fellow student at the University of Vienna, to come to the United States to work with him at DePauw. In 1935, Julian and Pikl completed the total synthesis of physostigmine and confirmed the structural formula assigned to it. Robert Robinson of Oxford University in the U.K. had been the first to publish a synthesis of physostigmine, but Julian noticed that the quoted melting point of Robinson's end product was incorrect, indicating that he had not created it. When Julian completed his synthesis, the melting point matched the correct one for natural physostigmine from the calabar bean. Julian also extracted stigmasterol, which took its name from Physostigma venenosum, the west African calabar bean that he hoped could serve as raw material for the synthesis of human steroidal hormones. At about this time, in 1934, Butenandt and Fernholz, in Germany, had shown that stigmasterol, isolated from soybean oil, could be converted to progesterone by synthetic organic chemistry.

== Private sector work: Glidden ==
=== Hiring ===
In 1956 Julian was denied a professorship at DePauw for racial reasons. DuPont offered a job to Pikl, but declined to hire Julian, despite his superlative qualifications as an organic chemist, apologizing that they were "unaware he was black". Julian next applied for a job at the Institute of Paper Chemistry in Appleton, Wisconsin. However, Appleton was a sundown town, forbidding African Americans from staying overnight, explicitly stating "No Negro should be a bed or boarded overnight in Appleton." Meanwhile, Julian had written to the Glidden Company, a supplier of soybean oil products, to request a five-gallon sample of the oil to use as his starting point for the synthesis of human steroidal sex hormones (in part because his wife was experiencing infertility). After receiving the request, W. J. O'Brien, a vice-president at Glidden, telephoned Julian, offering him the position of director of research at Glidden's Soya Products Division in Chicago. Nova has posited that he was offered the job by O'Brien because he was fluent in German, and Glidden had just purchased a modern continuous countercurrent solvent extraction plant from Germany for the extraction of vegetable oil from soybeans for paints and other uses.

=== Soy protein ===
Julian supervised the assembly of the plant at Glidden when he arrived in 1936. He then designed and supervised the construction of the world's first plant for the production of industrial-grade, isolated soy protein from oil-free soybean meal. Isolated soy protein could replace the more expensive milk casein in industrial applications such as coating and sizing of paper, glue for making Douglas fir plywood, and in the manufacture of water-based paints. At the start of World War II, Glidden sent a sample of Julian's isolated soy protein to National Foam System Inc. (today a unit of Kidde Fire Fighting), which used it to develop Aer-O-Foam, the U.S. Navy's firefighting "bean soup." While it was not exactly Julian's brainchild, his meticulous care in the preparation of the soy protein made the firefighting foam possible. When a hydrolyzate of isolated soy protein was fed into a water stream, the mixture was converted into a foam by means of an aerating nozzle. The soy protein foam was used to smother oil and gasoline fires aboard ships and was particularly useful on aircraft carriers. It has saved the lives of thousands of sailors and airmen. Citing this achievement, in 1947 the NAACP awarded Julian the Spingarn Medal, its highest honor. The 1943 United States Office of War Information film Food for Fighters features Julian as the soy expert when describing the inclusion of soy to boost the nutrition of K-rations.

=== Steroids ===
Percy's research at Glidden changed direction in 1940 when he began work on synthesizing progesterone, estrogen, and testosterone from the plant sterols stigmasterol and sitosterol, isolated from soybean oil by a foam technique he invented and patented. At that time, clinicians were discovering many uses for the newly discovered hormones. However, only minute quantities could be extracted from hundreds of pounds of animal spinal cords. In 1940, Julian was able to produce 100 pounds (45 kg) of mixed soy sterols daily, which had a value of $10,000 ($108,000 today) as sex hormones. Julian was soon ozonizing 100 pounds (45 kg) daily of mixed sterol dibromides. The soy stigmasterol was easily converted into commercial quantities of the female hormone progesterone, and the first pound of progesterone that he produced, valued at $63,500 ($684,000 today), was shipped to buyer Upjohn in an armored car. Production of other sex hormones soon followed.

His work made possible the production of these hormones on a larger industrial scale, with the potential of reducing the cost of treating hormonal deficiencies. Julian and his co-workers obtained patents for Glidden on key processes for the preparation of progesterone and testosterone from soybean plant sterols. Product patents held by a former cartel of European pharmaceutical companies had prevented a significant reduction in wholesale and retail prices for clinical use of these hormones in the 1940s. He saved many lives with this discovery. On April 13, 1949, rheumatologist Philip Hench at the Mayo Clinic announced the dramatic effectiveness of cortisone in treating rheumatoid arthritis. The cortisone was produced by Merck at great expense using a complex 36-step synthesis developed by chemist Lewis Sarett, starting with deoxycholic acid from cattle bile acids. On September 30, 1949, Julian announced an improved process for producing cortisone. This eliminated the use of osmium tetroxide, which was rare and expensive. By 1950, Glidden could begin producing closely related compounds which might have partial cortisone activity. Julian also announced the synthesis, starting with the cheap and readily available pregnenolone (synthesized from the soybean oil sterol stigmasterol) of the steroid cortexolone (also known as Reichstein's Substance S, and most often referred as 11-Deoxycortisol), a molecule that differed from cortisone by a single missing oxygen atom; and possibly 17α-hydroxyprogesterone and pregnenetriolone, which he hoped might also be effective in treating rheumatoid arthritis, but unfortunately they were not.

On April 5, 1952, biochemist Durey Peterson and microbiologist Herbert Murray at Upjohn published the first report of a fermentation process for the microbial 11α-oxygenation of steroids in a single step (by common molds of the order Mucorales). Their fermentation process could produce 11α-hydroxyprogesterone or 11α-hydrocortisone from progesterone or Compound S, respectively, which could then by further chemical steps be converted to cortisone or 11β-hydrocortisone (cortisol). After two years, Glidden abandoned production of cortisone to concentrate on Substance S. Julian developed a multistep process for conversion of pregnenolone, available in abundance from soybean oil sterols, to cortexolone. In 1952, Glidden, which had been producing progesterone and other steroids from soybean oil, shut down its own production and began importing them from Mexico through an arrangement with Diosynth (a small Mexican company founded in 1947 by Russell Marker after leaving Syntex). Glidden's cost of production of cortexolone was relatively high, so Upjohn decided to use progesterone, available in large quantity at low cost from Syntex, to produce cortisone and hydrocortisone.

In 1953, Glidden decided to leave the steroid business, which had been relatively unprofitable over the years despite Julian's innovative work. On December 1, 1953, Julian left Glidden after 18 years, giving up a salary of nearly $50,000 a year (equivalent to $600,000 in 2025) to found his own company, Julian Laboratories, Inc., taking over the small, concrete-block building of Suburban Chemical Company in Franklin Park, Illinois. On December 2, 1953, Pfizer acquired exclusive licenses of Glidden patents for the synthesis of Substance S. Pfizer had developed a fermentation process for microbial 11β-oxygenation of steroids in a single step that could convert Substance S directly to 11β-hydrocortisone (cortisol), with Syntex undertaking large-scale production of cortexolone at very low cost.

== Oak Park and Julian Laboratories ==
Around 1950, Julian moved his family to the Chicago suburb of Oak Park, becoming the first African-American family to reside there. Although some residents welcomed them, there was also opposition. Before they moved in, on Thanksgiving Day, 1950, their home was firebombed. Later, after they moved in, the house was attacked with dynamite on June 12, 1951. The attacks galvanized the community, and a community group was formed to support the Julians. Julian's son later recounted that during these times, he and his father often kept watch over the family's property by sitting on the front porch with a shotgun.

Julian's new research firm, Julian Laboratories, Inc., hired many of his best chemists, including African-Americans and women, from Glidden. He won a contract to provide Upjohn with $2 million worth of progesterone (equivalent to $22 million today). To compete against Syntex, he would have to use the same Mexican yam, obtained from the Mexican barbasco trade, as his starting material. Julian used his own money and borrowed from friends to build a processing plant in Mexico, but he could not get a permit from the government to harvest the yams. Abraham Zlotnik, a former Jewish University of Vienna classmate whom Julian had helped escape from the Holocaust, led a search to find a new yam source in Guatemala for the company.

In July 1956, Julian and executives of two other American companies trying to enter the Mexican steroid intermediates market appeared before a U.S. Senate subcommittee. They testified that Syntex was using undue influence to monopolize access to the Mexican yam. The hearings resulted in Syntex signing a consent decree with the U.S. Justice Department. While it did not admit to restraining trade, it promised not to do so in the future. Within five years, large American multinational pharmaceutical companies had acquired all six producers of steroid intermediates in Mexico, four of which had been Mexican-owned. Syntex reduced the cost of steroid intermediates more than 250-fold over twelve years, from $80 per gram in 1943 to $0.31 per gram in 1955. Competition from Upjohn and General Mills, which had together made very substantial improvements in the production of progesterone from stigmasterol, forced the price of Mexican progesterone down to less than $0.15 per gram in 1957. The price continued to fall, bottoming out at $0.08 per gram in 1968.

In 1958, Upjohn purchased 6,900 kg of progesterone from Syntex at $0.135 per gram, 6,201kg of progesterone from Searle (who had acquired Pesa) at $0.143 per gram, 5,150 kg of progesterone from Julian Laboratories at $0.14 per gram, and 1,925 kg of progesterone from General Mills (who had acquired Protex) at $0.142 per gram. Despite continually falling bulk prices of steroid intermediates, an oligopoly of large American multinational pharmaceutical companies kept the wholesale prices of corticosteroid drugs fixed and unchanged into the 1960s. Cortisone was fixed at $5.48 per gram from 1954, hydrocortisone at $7.99 per gram from 1954, and prednisone at $35.80 per gram from 1956. Merck and Roussel Uclaf concentrated on improving the production of corticosteroids from cattle bile acids. In 1960 Roussel produced almost one-third of the world's corticosteroids from bile acids. Julian Laboratories chemists found a way to quadruple the yield on a product on which they were barely breaking even. Julian reduced their price per kg for the product from $4,000 to $400. He sold the company in 1961 for $2.3 million (equivalent to $25 million today) and became one of the first black millionaires. The U.S. and Mexico facilities were purchased by Smith Kline, and Julian's chemical plant in Guatemala was purchased by Upjohn.

In 1964, Julian founded Julian Associates and Julian Research Institute, which he managed for the rest of his life. Julian also helped to found the Legal Defense and Educational Fund of Chicago. Julian died of liver cancer in Waukegan, Illinois on April 19, 1975, a week after his 76th birthday.

== Personal ==
On December 24, 1935, he married Anna Roselle (Ph.D. in sociology, 1937, University of Pennsylvania). They had two children: Percy Lavon Julian Jr. (August 31, 1940 – February 24, 2008), who became a noted civil rights lawyer in Madison, Wisconsin; and Faith Roselle Julian (March 18, 1944 – March 26, 2026), who spent her life in their Oak Park home and made inspirational speeches about her father and his contributions to science.

== Honors and legacy ==
- In 1947, he was awarded the Spingarn Medal from the NAACP.
- In 1950, the Chicago Sun-Times named Percy Julian the Chicagoan of the Year.
- He was elected to the National Academy of Sciences in 1973 in recognition of his scientific achievements. He became the second African American to be inducted, after David Blackwell.
- Since 1975, the National Organization for the Professional Advancement of Black Chemists and Chemical Engineers has presented the Percy L. Julian Award for Pure and Applied Research in Science and Engineering.
- In 1975, Percy L. Julian High School was opened on the south side of Chicago, Illinois as a Chicago public high school.
- In 1980, the science and mathematics building on the DePauw University campus was rededicated as the Percy L. Julian Mathematics and Science Center. In Greencastle, Indiana, where DePauw is located, a street was named after Julian.
- In 1985, Hawthorne School in Oak Park, Illinois, was renamed Percy Julian Middle School.
- Illinois State University, where Julian served on the board of trustees, named a hall after him.
- A structure at Coppin State University is named the Percy Julian Science Building.
- In 1990, he was inducted into the National Inventors Hall of Fame.
- In 1993 Julian was honored on a stamp issued by the United States Postal Service.
- In 1999, the American Chemical Society recognized Julian's synthesis of physostigmine as a National Historic Chemical Landmark.
- In 2002, scholar Molefi Kete Asante listed Percy Lavon Julian on his list of 100 Greatest African-Americans.
- In 2011, the qualifying exam preparation committee at the Albert Einstein College of Medicine was named for Percy Julian.
- In 2014, Google honored him with a Doodle.
- In 2019, asteroid 5622 Percy julian, discovered by Eleanor Helin at Palomar Observatory in 1990, was named in his memory. The naming citation was published by the Minor Planet Center on August 27, 2019 (M.P.C. 115893).
- In November 2022, it was announced that Robert E Lee High School in Montgomery, AL would be renamed to Dr. Percy L. Julian High School.

=== Nova documentary ===
Ruben Santiago-Hudson portrayed Percy Julian in the Public Broadcasting Service Nova documentary about his life, called "Forgotten Genius". It was presented on the PBS network on February 6, 2007, sponsored by the Camille and Henry Dreyfus Foundation with further funding by the National Endowment for the Humanities. Approximately sixty of Julian's family members, friends, and work associates were interviewed for the docudrama. Production on the biopic began in May 2002 at DePauw University's Greencastle campus, where Julian's bust is on display in the atrium of the Percy Lavon Julian Science and Mathematics Center. The completion and broadcast of the documentary was delayed while Nova commissioned and published a companion book on Julian's life. According to University of Illinois historian James Anderson in the film, "His story is a story of great accomplishment, of heroic efforts and overcoming tremendous odds...a story about who we are and what we stand for and the challenges that have been there and the challenges that are still with us."

=== Archive ===
The Percy Lavon Julian family papers are archived at DePauw University.

== Patents ==
- U.S. patent 2,218,971, October 22, 1940, Recovery of sterols
- U.S. patent 2,373,686, July 15, 1942, Phosphatide product and method of making
- U.S. patent 2,752,339, June 26, 1956, Preparation of cortisone
- U.S. patent 3,149,132, September 15, 1964, 16-aminomenthyl-17-alkyltestosterone derivatives
- U.S. patent 3,274,178, September 20, 1966, Method for preparing 16(alpha)-hydroxypregnenes and intermediates obtained therein
- U.S. patent 3,761,469, September 25, 1973, Process for the manufacture of steroid chlorohydrins; with Arnold Lippert Hirsch

== Publications ==
- On the Progenitors of Certain Plant Alkaloids and the Mechanism of their Formation in the Plant Structure; Percy L. Julian. Proc. Indiana Acad. Sci. 1933, 43, pp 122–126.
- Studies in the Indole Series. I. The Synthesis of Alpha-Benzylindoles; Percy L. Julian, Josef Pikl; J. Am. Chem. Soc. 1933, 55(5), pp 2105–2110. doi:10.1021/ja01332a054
- Studies in the Indole Series. V. The Complete Synthesis of Physostigmine (Eserine); Percy L. Julian, Josef Pikl; J. Am. Chem. Soc. 1935, 57(4), pp 755–757. doi:10.1021/ja01307a051
- Studies in the Indole Series VII. The Course of the Fischer Reaction with Ketones of the Type R CH_{2} CO CH_{3}. Alpha-Propyl and Alpha-Homoveratryl Indole; Percy L Julian, Josef Pikl; Proc. Indiana Acad. Sci. 1935, 45, pp 145–150.

== See also ==
- List of African-American inventors and scientists
