= Wildlife of Mexico =

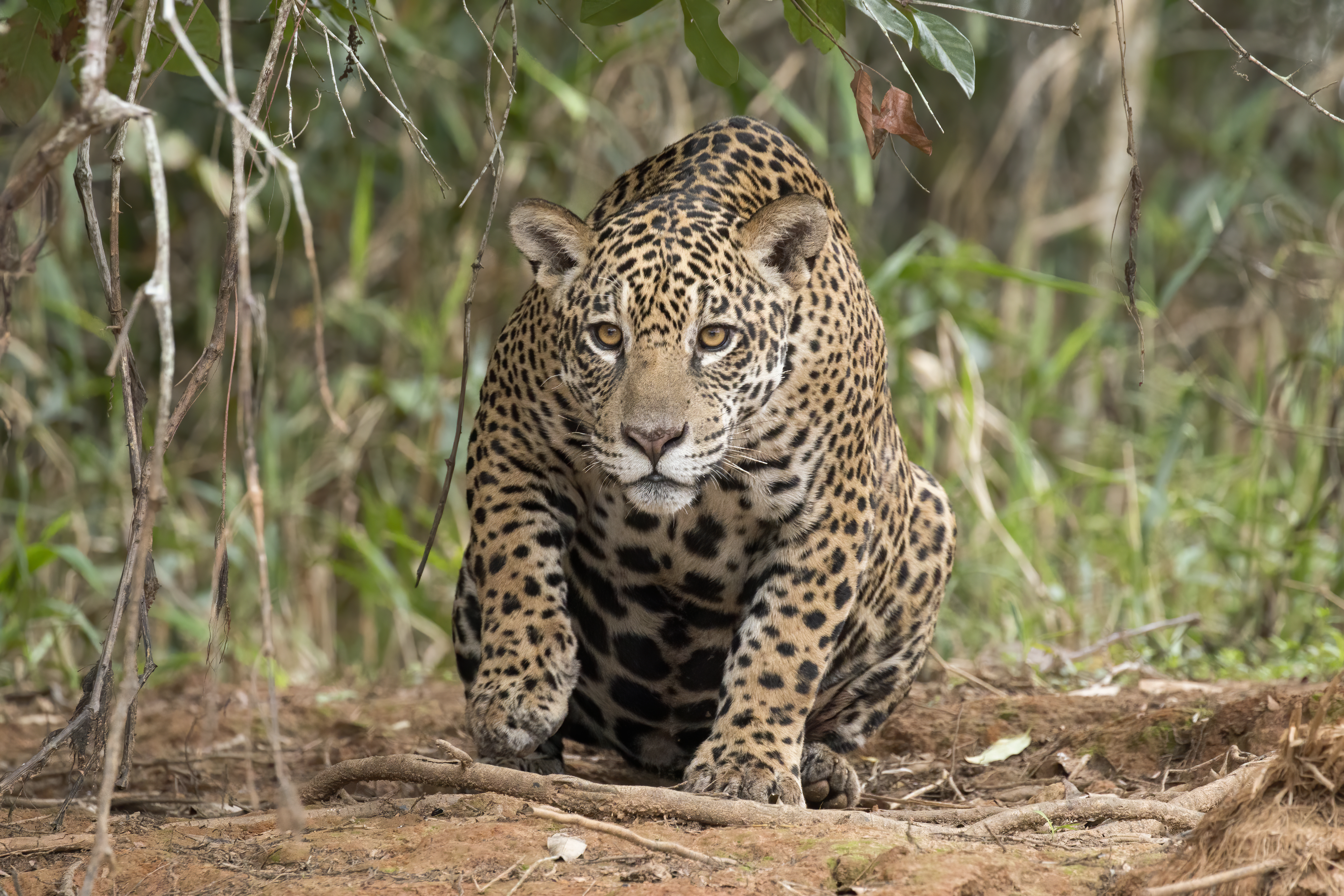
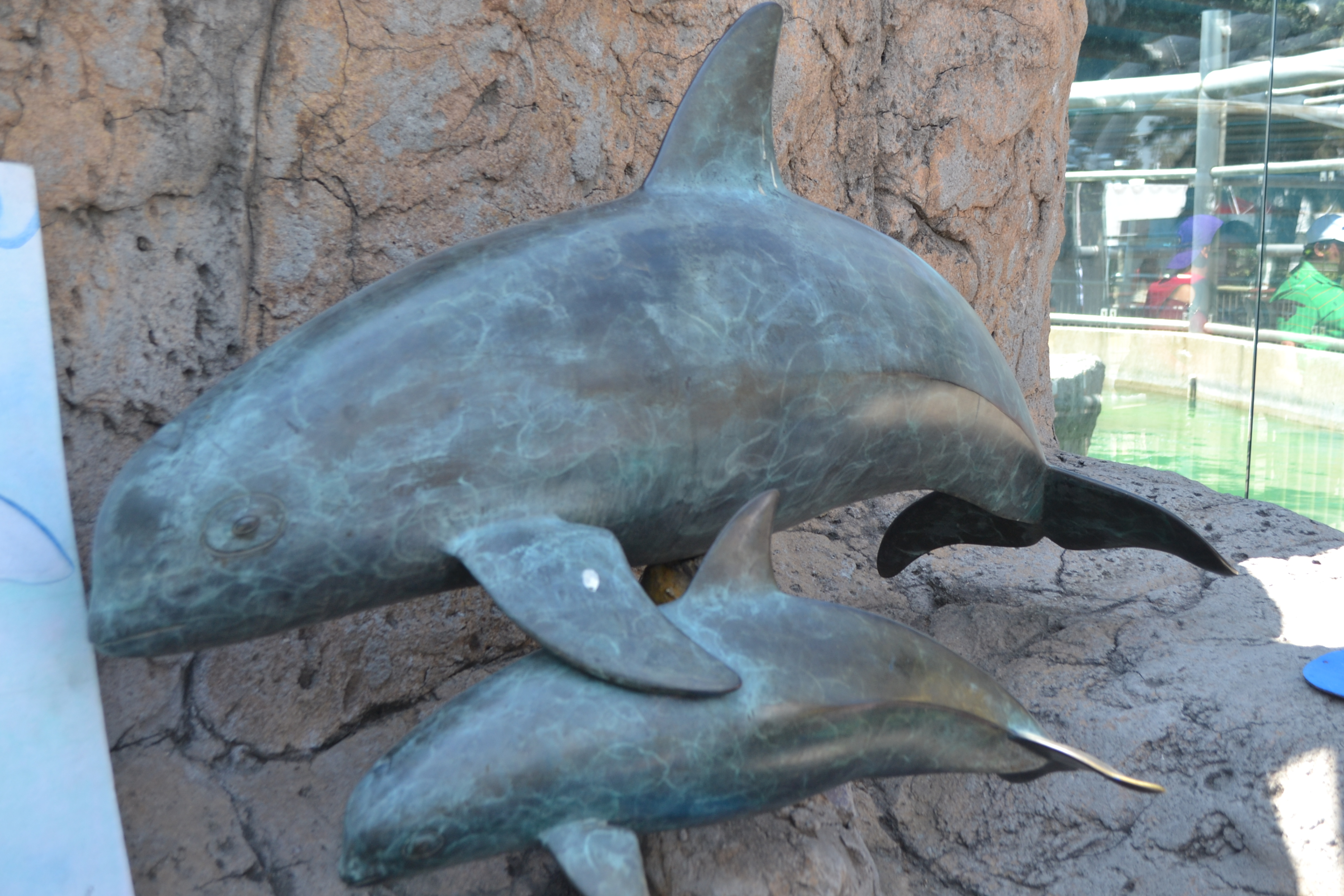
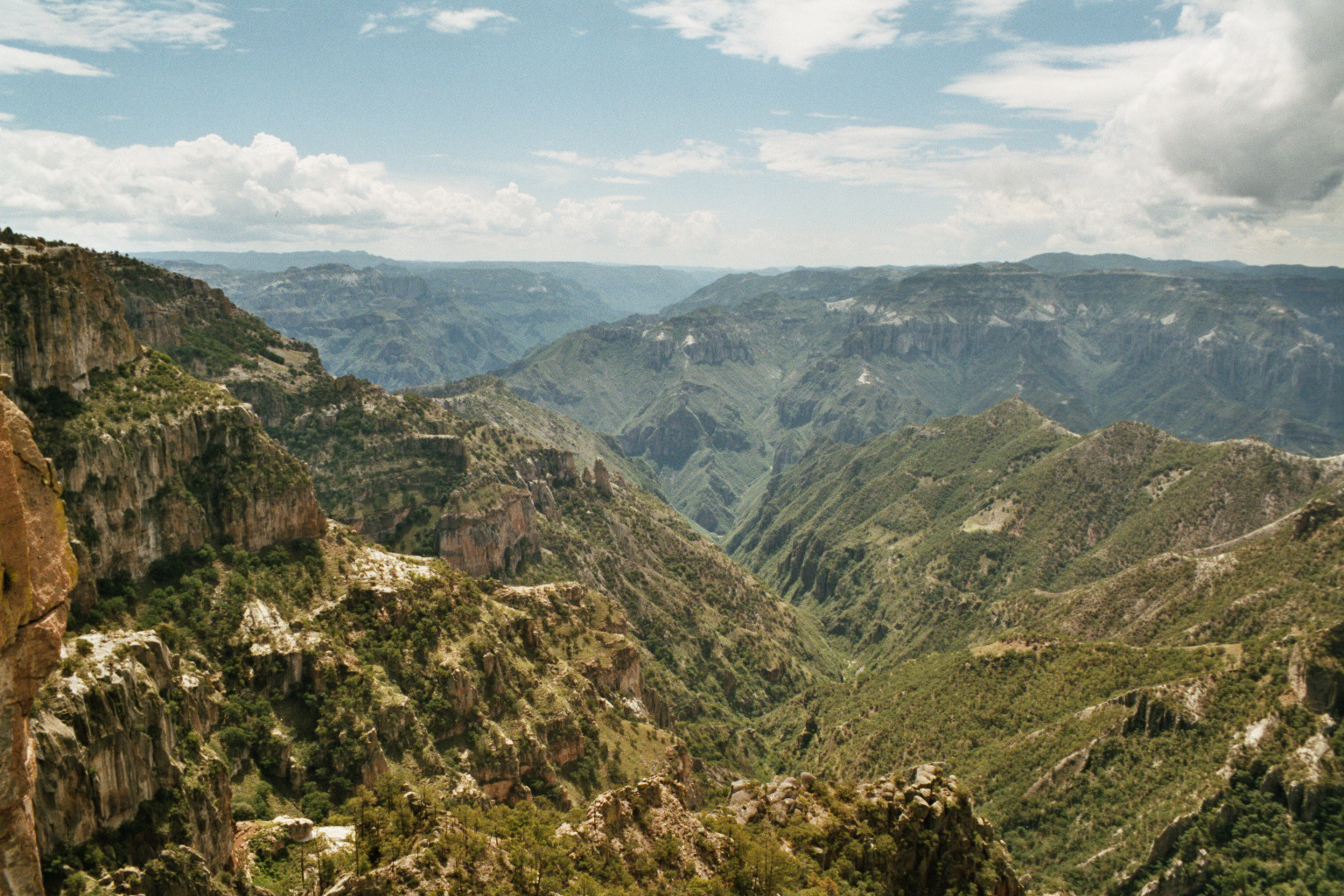
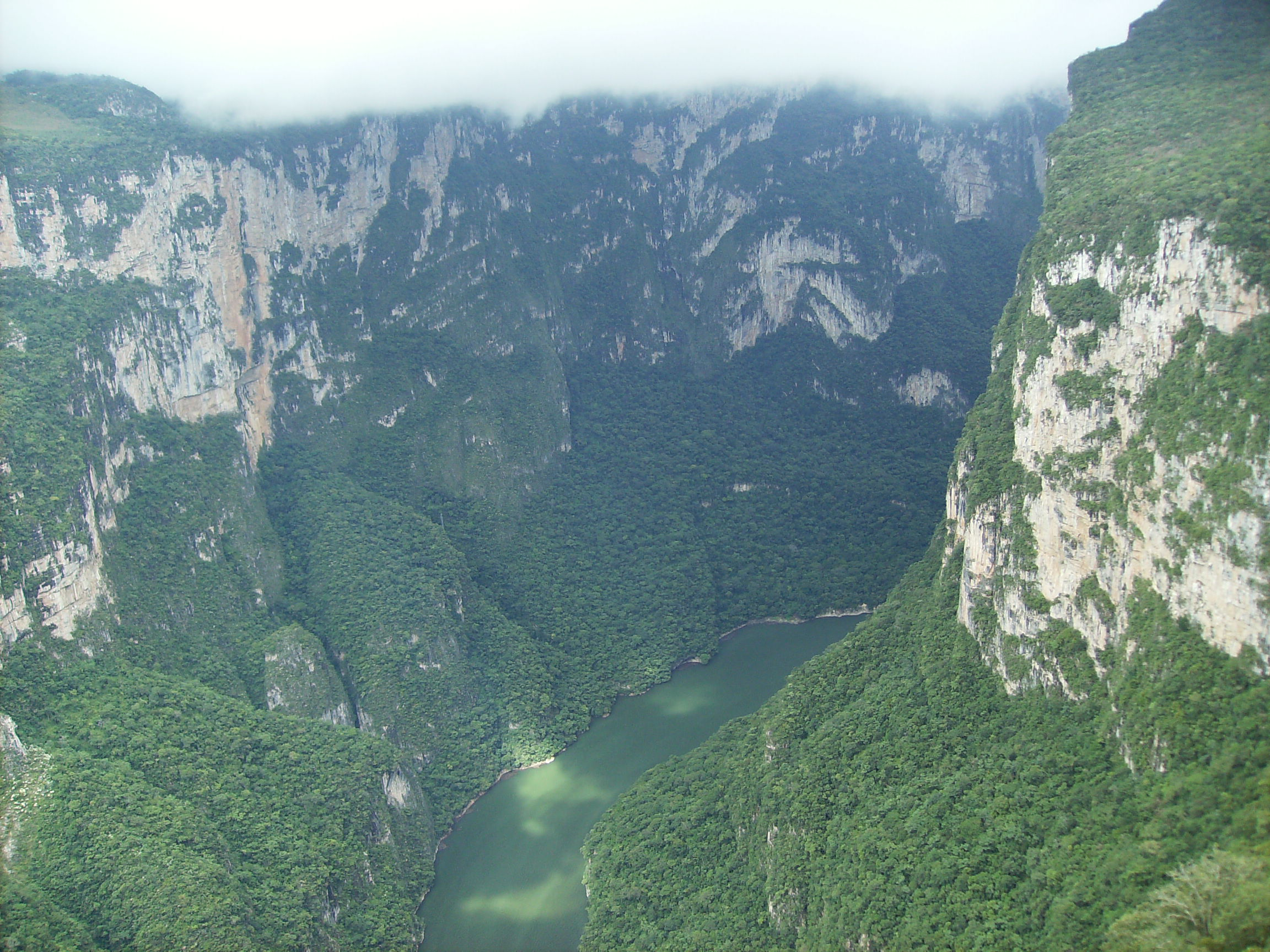
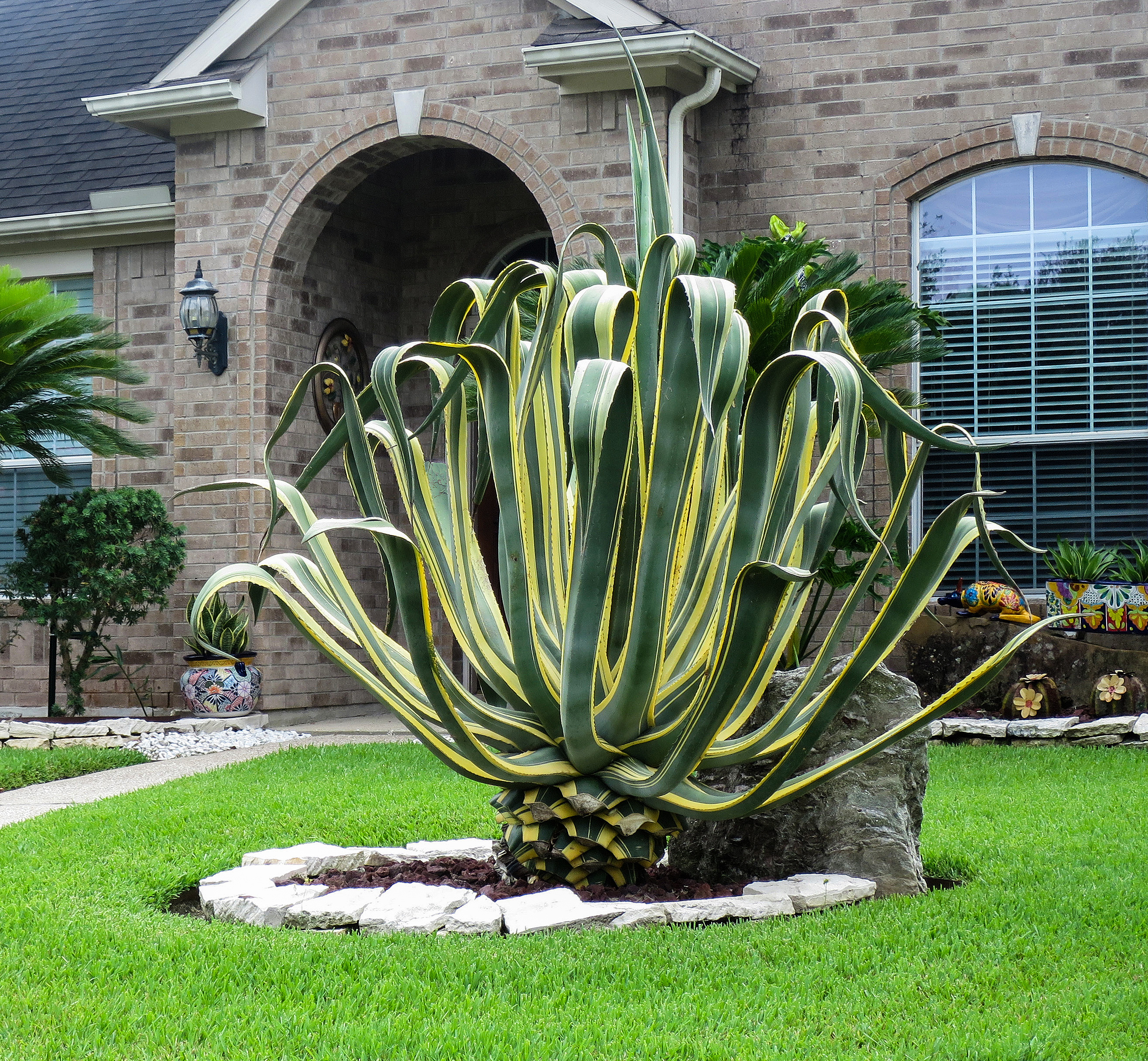
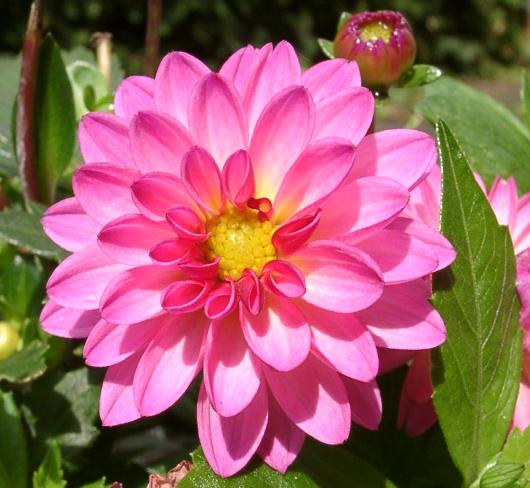
Clockwise from top left:
Jaguar (Panthera onca), vaquita (Phocoena sinus), Copper Canyon, Sumidero Canyon, Agave, Dahlia

Mexico ranks fourth in the world in biodiversity and is one of the 17 megadiverse countries. With over 200,000 different species, Mexico is home of 10–12% of the world's biodiversity. Mexico ranks first in biodiversity in reptiles with 707 known species, second in mammals with 438 species, fourth in amphibians with 290 species, and fourth in flora, with 26,000 species. Mexico is also ranked second in the world in ecosystems and fourth in overall species. About 2,500 species are protected by Mexican legislation. In 2002, Mexico had the second fastest rate of deforestation in the world, second only to Brazil. It had a 2019 Forest Landscape Integrity Index mean score of 6.82/10, ranking it 63rd globally out of 172 countries.

In Mexico, 170,000 square kilometers (65,637 sq mi) are considered "protected natural areas". These include 34 biosphere reserves (unaltered ecosystems), 67 national parks, 4 natural monuments (protected in perpetuity for their aesthetic, scientific or historical value), 26 areas of protected flora and fauna, 4 areas for natural resource protection (conservation of soil, hydrological basins and forests) and 17 sanctuaries (zones rich in diverse species). Plants indigenous to Mexico are grown in many parts of the world and integrated into their own national cuisines. Some of Mexico's native culinary ingredients include: maize, tomato, beans, squash, chocolate, vanilla, avocado, guava, chayote, epazote, camote, jícama, nopal, zucchini, tejocote, huitlacoche, sapote, mamey sapote, and a great variety of chiles, such as the habanero and the jalapeño. Most of these names come from the indigenous language of Nahuatl. Tequila, the distilled alcoholic drink made from cultivated agave cacti is a major industry. Because of its high biodiversity Mexico has also been a frequent site of bioprospecting by international research bodies. The first highly successful instance being the discovery in 1947 of the tuber barbasco (Dioscorea composita) which has a high content of diosgenin, revolutionizing the production of synthetic hormones in the 1950s and 1960s and eventually leading to the invention of combined oral contraceptive pills.
