= George Rosenkranz =

Hungarian chemist (1916 – 2019)

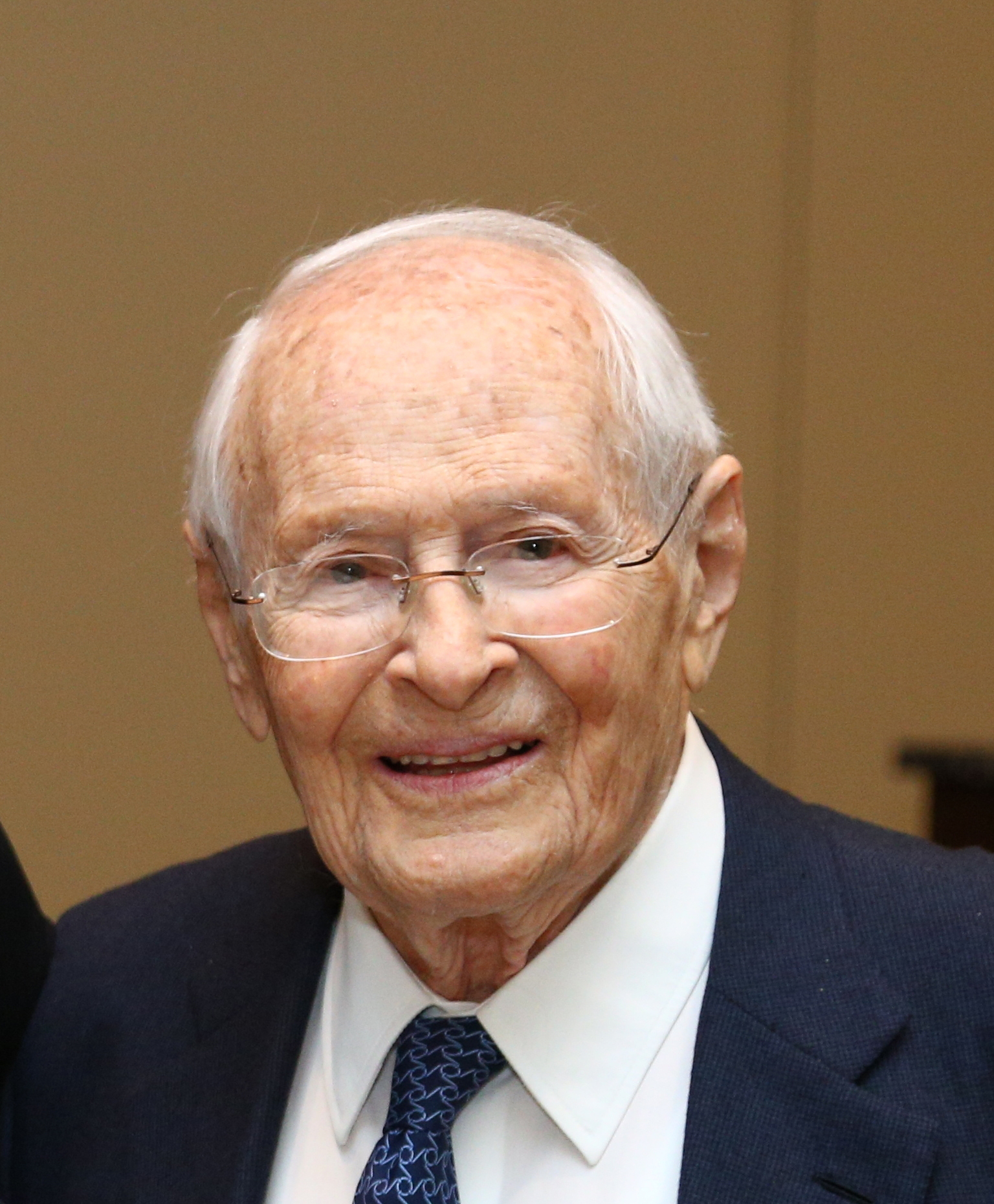
- George Rosenkranz receiving the Biotechnology Heritage Award in Chicago, 2013
- Born: 20 August 1916; Budapest, Hungary, Austria-Hungary
- Died: 23 June 2019 (aged 102); Atherton, California, U.S.
- Known for: Synthesis of norethisterone, the first orally highly active progestin, used in one of the first oral contraceptive pills
- Scientific career
- Fields: Chemistry

George Rosenkranz (born Rosenkranz György; 20 August 1916 – 23 June 2019) was a pioneering Hungarian-born Mexican scientist in the field of steroid chemistry, who used native Mexican plant sources as raw materials. He was born in Hungary, studied in Switzerland and emigrated to the Americas to escape the Nazis, eventually settling in Mexico.

At Syntex corporation in Mexico City, Rosenkranz assembled a research group of organic chemists that included future leaders from around the world, such as Carl Djerassi, Luis E. Miramontes and Alejandro Zaffaroni. Revolutionary advances in the understanding of steroid drugs and their production occurred under Dr Rosenkranz's direction. Syntex synthesized a progestin used in some of the first combined oral contraceptive pills and numerous other useful steroids. Under Rosenkranz's leadership, Syntex became "a powerful international force in the development of steroidal pharmaceuticals", and "a pioneer of biotechnology" in the San Francisco Bay Area. Rosenkranz stepped down as CEO in 1982, at the age of 65.

In 2012, he was awarded the Biotechnology Heritage Award, in recognition of his significant contributions to the development of biotechnology through discovery, innovation, and public understanding. He turned 100 in August 2016.

Rosenkranz was also an American Contract Bridge League (ACBL) Grand Life Master at his hobby of duplicate bridge, with more than 13,000 masterpoints and 12 NABC titles (below). He wrote or co-wrote more than 10 books on bridge.

== Scientific research ==
External videos
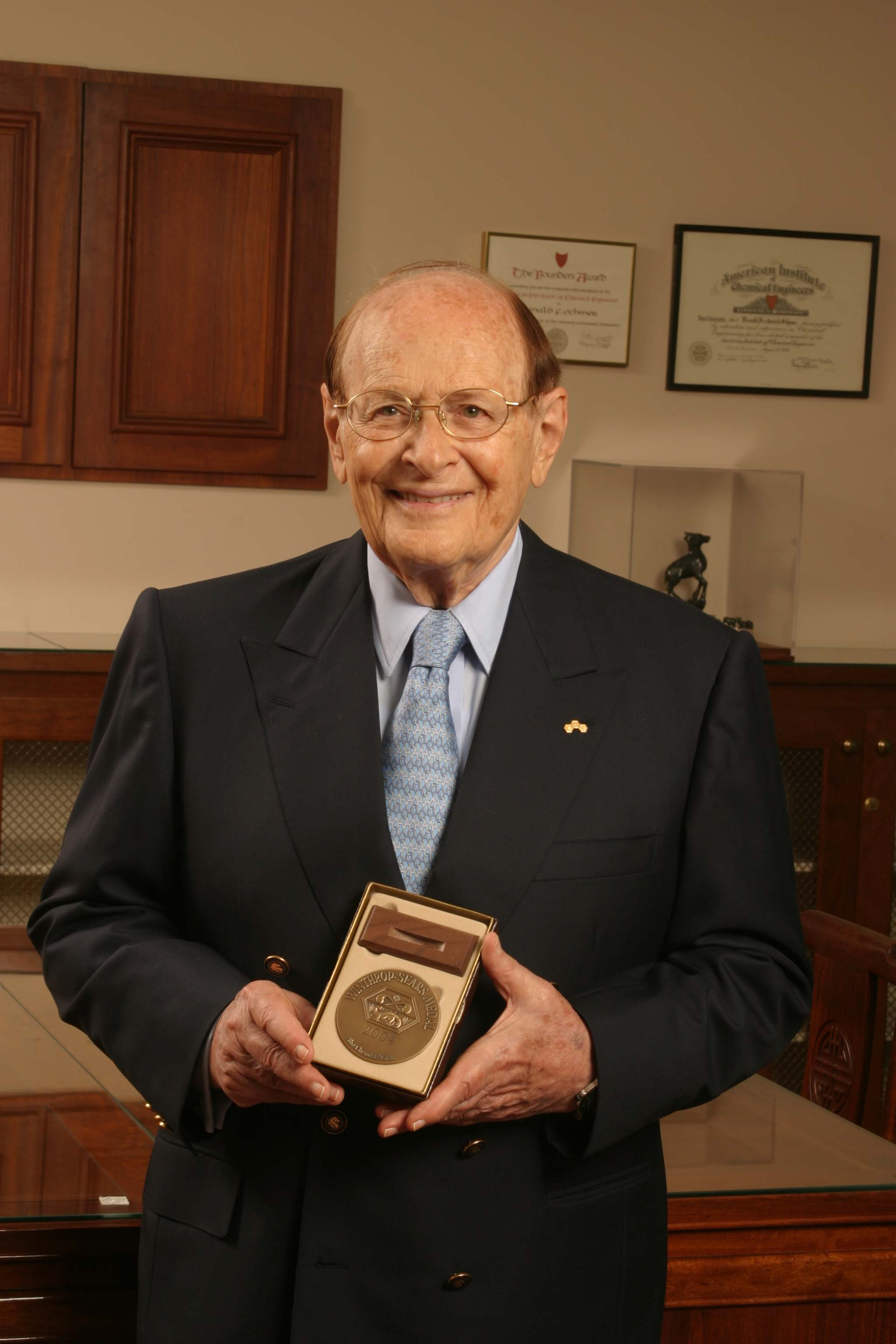
- “Scientists You Must Know: Pioneering steroid researcher George Rosenkranzh”
- “BIO 2013 Award Presentation to George Rosenkranz”, Science History Institute

Rosenkranz was born in 1916 in Budapest, Hungary, the son of Etel (Weiner) and Bertalan Rosenkranz. Rosenkranz studied chemical engineering at the Swiss Federal Institute of Technology, where he received his doctorate. His mentor, future Nobel Prize winner Lavoslav Ružička, began Rosenkranz's interest in steroid research. However, Nazi sympathizers were active in Zurich. Ružička shielded Rosenkranz and other Jewish colleagues, but their presence put their mentor at risk. "We got together and we decided to leave Switzerland to protect him," Rosenkranz said in a 2002 article for the Pan American Health Organization's magazine.

Ružička arranged an academic position for Rosenkranz in Quito, Ecuador. While Rosenkranz was waiting in Havana, Cuba, for a ship to Ecuador, the Japanese attacked Pearl Harbor. The United States immediately entered World War II. Unable to go to Ecuador, Rosenkranz accepted the Cuban president Fulgencio Batista's offer allowing refugees to stay in the country and work. He found work at the Vieta Plasencia Lab, where he was asked to develop treatments for venereal disease.

The important role of hormones in human health was already known, but ways to synthesize them were unknown. George Rosenkranz's skills as a chemist attracted the interest of Emeric Somlo, a Hungarian immigrant, and Dr. Federico Lehmann at Syntex in Mexico City, Mexico. They had formed the company in 1944 to work with Russell Marker, a Penn State professor, and sought to synthesize the hormone progesterone from diosgenin-containing Mexican yams, which would eventually give rise to the Mexican barbasco trade. After a disagreement Marker left, taking his steroid knowledge with him. Rosenkranz was recruited to replace him, and moved to Mexico City in 1945.

Rosenkranz faced the challenge of analyzing Marker's samples to identify their ingredients and reverse engineering Marker's chemical production processes. He didn't have much help: his initial staff included nine lab assistants and only one other chemist, and Mexico lacked a PhD program in chemistry.

When he couldn't find enough fully trained local chemists, Rosenkranz recruited researchers from Mexico and around the world. Rosenkranz also helped to create an institute of chemistry, the Instituto de Química (Universidad Nacional Autónoma de México), now considered "a flagship in Mexico's ethnobotanical research". He was able to attract significant synthetic organic chemists as researchers and instructors and to obtain funding to expand programs for the training of organic chemists. He and his colleagues regularly worked at Syntex during the day and then spent the evenings teaching chemistry. Rosenkranz also helped to start the Institute for Molecular Biology in Palo Alto.

Attracting young chemists such as Carl Djerassi, Luis E. Miramontes and Alejandro Zaffaroni was critical to Syntex's first big success. Miramontes, George Rosenkranz and Djerassi synthesis of norethindrone, later proven to be an effective pregnancy inhibitor, led to an infusion of capital in Syntex and Mexican steroid pharma industry. The Mayo clinic had reported that the steroid hormone cortisone was an effective anti-inflammatory, capable of relieving painful rheumatoid arthritis symptoms. However, as described by Djerassi, "Until 1951, the only source of cortisone was through an extraordinarily complex process of 36 different chemical transformations starting from animal bile acids." Several prominent groups of international scientists were attempting to be the first to synthesize cortisone. Rosenkranz's team started working in two shifts, and their dedication paid off. In 1951, Rosenkranz, Djerassi, and their fellow researchers submitted a paper on the synthesis of cortisone, edging out reports from Harvard and Merck by a matter of weeks.

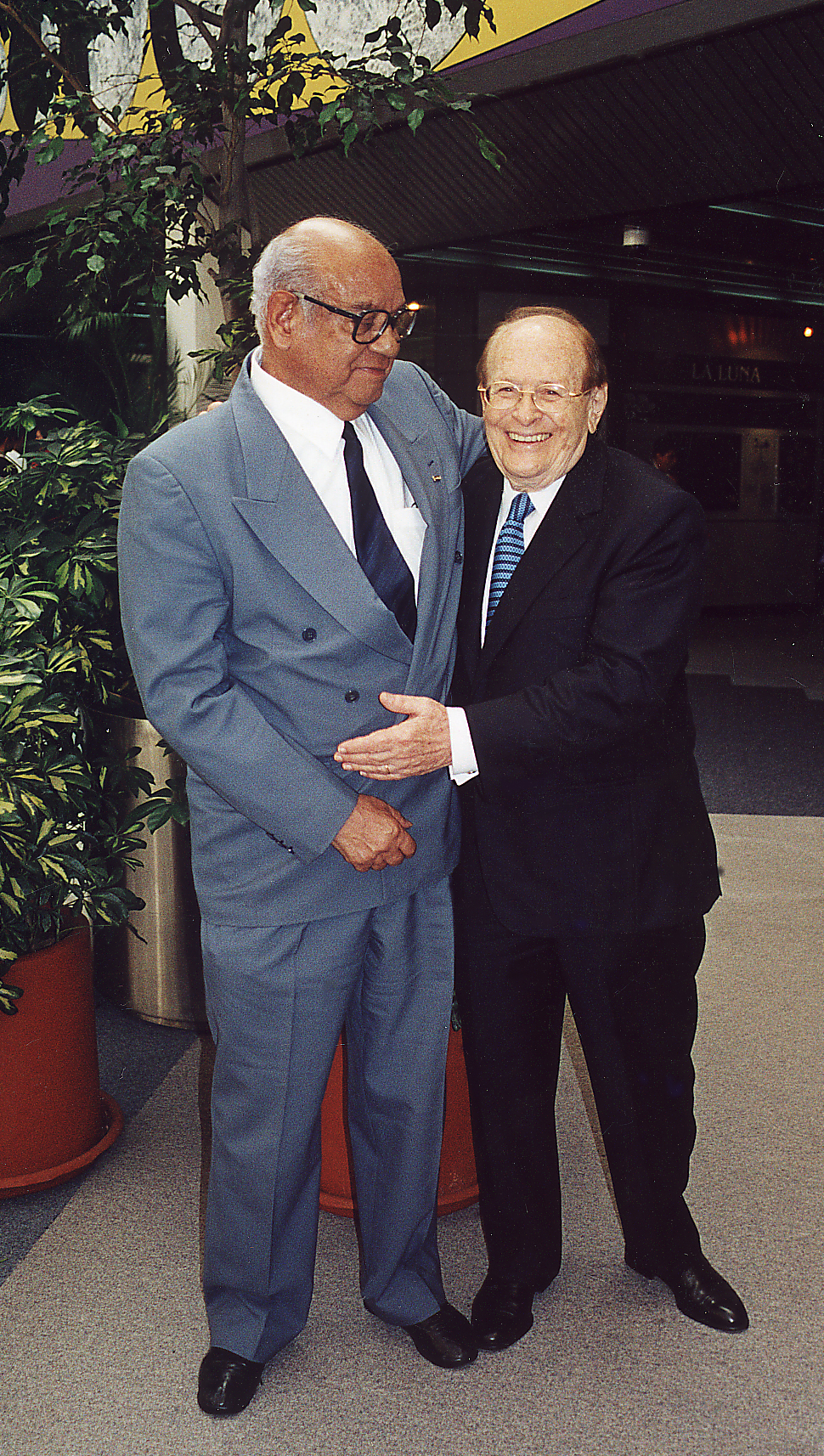
George Rosenkranz (right) and Luis E. Miramontes (left), 2001 at UNAM, in Mexico City

Having successfully synthesized cortisone, the researchers at Syntex continued to work on the synthesis of progesterone. A female sex hormone, progesterone was used to help pregnant women avoid miscarriages, and to treat infertility. Five months later, under the direction of Rosenkranz and Djerassi, the last step of the synthesis of norethisterone (norethindrone) was successfully completed by Miramontes, and Syntex applied for a patent, which was granted as US patent 2,744,122 on May 1, 1956. Syntex initially reached an agreement with the American company Parke-Davis to market norethisterone as Norlutin for the treatment of gynecological disorders, which was approved by the FDA in 1957. Parke-Davis however refused to develop Syntex's norethisterone as a contraceptive over concerns about a possible Catholic boycott of its other products. This delay placed Syntex at a disadvantage, but by 1962, they had partnered with Johnson & Johnson's Ortho division to introduce the birth control pill Ortho-Novum, which used Syntex's norethisterone. In March 1964, the FDA approved Syntex's version of Ortho-Novum with the brand name Norinyl (norethisterone 2 mg + mestranol 100 μg). In March 1964, the FDA also approved Parke-Davis's version of the German company Schering's oral contraceptive Anovlar with the brand name Norlestrin (norethisterone acetate 2.5 mg + ethinylestradiol 50 μg).

Rosenkranz understood the importance of peer recognition, not just commercial success, to the scientists who worked for him. He has said, "To have people work productively, you have to build an intellectually challenging environment, allow creative freedom, and insure peer recognition and respect for the individual." A cascade of papers on steroid chemistry issued from the Rosenkranz lab during the 1940s and 1950s. Rosenkranz himself is the author or co-author of over 300 articles in steroid chemistry and is named on over 150 patents.

Rosenkranz gave up his executive positions at Syntex in 1981. Although technically retired for over three decades, Rosenkranz was still active in the industry. In 1996, he became a member of the board of Digital Gene Technologies He was also president of the advisory board of ICT Mexicana. He died at the age of 102 on 23 June 2019.

=== Scientific memberships ===
- National Academy of Medicine of Mexico
- New York Academy of Science
- University of Tel Aviv boardmember
- Weizmann Institute of Science in Rehovot, Israel, board member

=== Scientific awards ===
- 2013 Biotechnology Heritage Award, from the Biotechnology Industry Organization (BIO) and the Chemical Heritage Foundation
- 2004 Winthrop-Sears Medal, from the Chemical Heritage Foundation and The Chemists' Club, with Alexander Zaffaroni
- 2001 Condecoracion Eduardo Liceaga, Mexican highest award for contributions to the health field.
- 1994 Dr. Leopoldo Rio de la Loza, Mexican National Prize in Pharmaceutical Sciences
- Leadership Award of the Mexican Health Federation

== Bridge ==
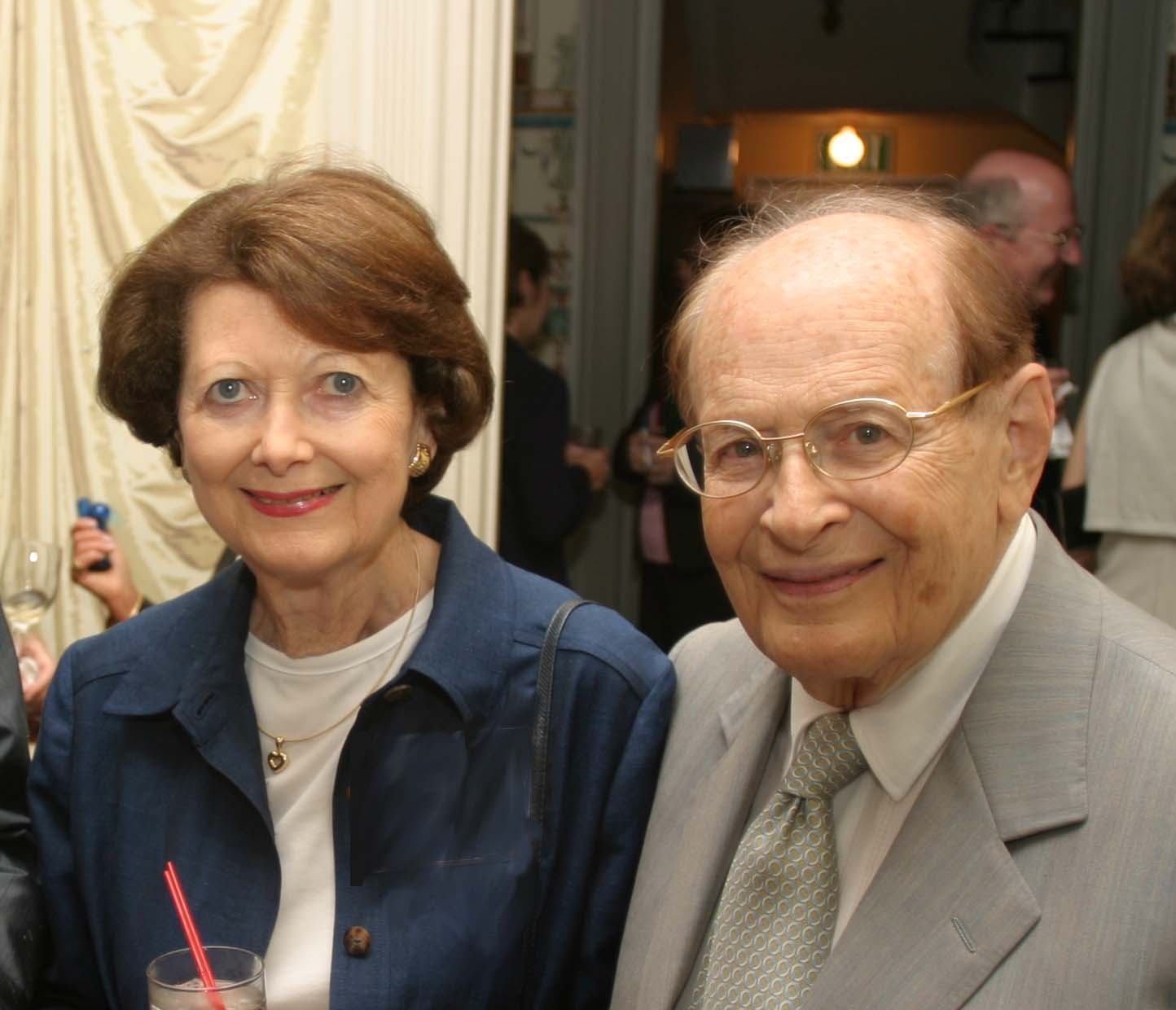
Edith and George Rosenkranz, 2004

Rosenkranz was a world-class bridge player and one of the most successful in Mexico. He won 12 NABC-level events at thrice-annual North American Bridge Championships meets, including all four major teams-of-four titles: the Grand Nationals, Reisinger, Spingold and Vanderbilt. In world championship teams competition, he represented Mexico in the quadrennial World Team Olympiad three times from 1972 to 1996 and the United States in the 1983 Bermuda Bowl. In addition, he has made significant contributions to bidding theory. He created the Romex bidding system, an extension of Standard American with many gadgets. He invented the Rosenkranz double and Rosenkranz redouble, and wrote more than a dozen books on bridge.

=== Edith Rosenkranz's kidnapping ===
In July 1984, Rosenkranz' wife Edith was kidnapped at the summer North American Bridge Championships in Washington, D.C., by Glenn I. Wright and Dennis Moss, and ransomed for one million dollars. The FBI and the District of Columbia police captured Wright and Moss, and she was returned safely. The ransom money was later recovered and the two kidnappers were later convicted and sentenced, as was a third defendant, Orland D. Tolden. Wright was released in 1999, Moss in 1994, and Tolden in 1989.

=== Bridge awards ===
- ACBL Hall of Fame, Blackwood Award 2000
- ACBL Honorary Member 1990
- Precision Award 1976

=== Tournament wins and runners-up ===
Wins

- North American Bridge Championships (12)
  - Master Mixed Teams (1) 1990
  - Open Swiss Teams (1) 1991
  - North American Swiss Teams (1) 1990
  - Grand National Open Teams (1) 1981
  - Men's Board-a-Match Teams (2) 1984, 1987
  - Reisinger Board-a-Match Teams (1) 1985
  - Spingold Knockout Teams (2) 1976, 1984
  - Vanderbilt Knockout Teams (3) 1975, 1976, 1982

Runners-up

- North American Bridge Championships (15)
  - Blue Ribbon Pairs (1) 1974
  - Silver Ribbon Pairs (1) 1992
  - Master Mixed Teams (3) 1967, 1984, 1994
  - Open Swiss Teams (2) 1998, 2003
  - Men's Board-a-Match Teams (1) 1975
  - Open Board-a-Match Teams (2) 1990, 2000
  - Spingold Knockout Teams (1) 1967
  - Vanderbilt Knockout Teams (2) 1978, 2001
  - Reisinger Board-a-Match Teams (2) 1980, 1997
- Other notable 2nd places:
  - United States Bridge Federation Bermuda Bowl qualifiers (1) 1982

== Publications ==
Bridge books by Rosenkranz

- The Romex System of Bidding: a dynamic approach to bridge (New York: World Publishing Co., 1970)
- Win with Romex: the key to accurate bidding (Crown Publishers, 1975)
- Bid Your Way to the Top (New York state: Barclay Bridge Supplies, 1978)
- Bridge, the Bidder's Game (Louisville, KY: Devyn Press, 1985)
- Slam Bidding (Devyn, 1985) – Championship bridge series, no. 33
- Everything You Always Wanted to Know About Trump Leads and Were Not Afraid to Ask (Devyn, 1986)
- Tips for Tops (Devyn, 1988)
- More Tips for Tops (Devyn, 1991)
- Our Man Godfrey: tales from the bridge table (Devyn, 1994), ed. Phillip Alder – love story and bridge instruction

Bridge books with co-authors

- Modern Ideas in Bidding (Devyn, 1982), with Alan Truscott
- Bid to Win, Play for Pleasure (Devyn, 1990), with Alder
- Bidding on Target (Devyn, 1992), with Truscott and Alder
- Godfrey's Bridge Challenge (Devyn, 1996), with Alder
- Godfrey's Stairway To The Stars: a step-by-step guide to modern bidding (Devyn, 1998), with Alder
- Godfrey's Angels (Devyn, 2001), with Alder

The four Godfrey books combine fictional narrative and instructional bridge. The second, and first with co-author credit to Phillip Alder, Godfrey's Bridge Challenge "brings the Romex system to life through lively anecdotes instruction and quizzes". The last, Godfrey's Angels incorporates 1998–2001 improvements in the system.

Memoir

- George and Edith Rosenkranz: a memoir of their lives and times (Philadelphia: Science History Consultants, 2011), with editor Arnold Thackray, OCLC 759935172
