= Sarsasapogenin =

Names
- IUPAC name (25S)-5β-Spirostan-3β-ol
- Systematic IUPAC name (2S,2′R,4aS,4bS,5′S,6aS,6bR,7S,9aS,10aS,10bR,12aR)-4a,5′,6a,7-Tetramethyloctadecahydrospiro[naphtho[2′,1′:4,5]indeno[2,1-b]furan-8,2′-oxan]-2-ol

Identifiers
| CAS Number | 126-19-2 |
| 3D model (JSmol) | Interactive image |
| ChEMBL | ChEMBL1171146 |
| ChemSpider | 83145 |
| ECHA InfoCard | 100.004.343 |
| EC Number | 204-776-3 |
| PubChem CID | 92095 |
| UNII | CFS802C28F |
| CompTox Dashboard (EPA) | DTXSID00903921 |
- InChI: InChI=1S/C27H44O3/c1-16-7-12-27(29-15-16)17(2)24-23(30-27)14-22-20-6-5-18-13-19(28)8-10-25(18,3)21(20)9-11-26(22,24)4/h16-24,28H,5-15H2,1-4H3/t16-,17-,18+,19-,20+,21-,22-,23-,24-,25-,26-,27+/m0/s1 Key: GMBQZIIUCVWOCD-WWASVFFGSA-N; InChI=1/C27H44O3/c1-16-7-12-27(29-15-16)17(2)24-23(30-27)14-22-20-6-5-18-13-19(28)8-10-25(18,3)21(20)9-11-26(22,24)4/h16-24,28H,5-15H2,1-4H3/t16-,17-,18+,19-,20+,21-,22-,23-,24-,25-,26-,27+/m0/s1 Key: GMBQZIIUCVWOCD-WWASVFFGBR
- SMILES: C[C@H]1CC[C@@]2([C@H]([C@H]3[C@@H](O2)C[C@@H]4[C@@]3(CC[C@H]5[C@H]4CC[C@H]6[C@@]5(CC[C@@H](C6)O)C)C)C)OC1

Properties
| Chemical formula | C_{27}H_{44}O_{3} |
| Molar mass | 416.64 g/mol |
| Melting point | 199 to 199.5 °C (390.2 to 391.1 °F; 472.1 to 472.6 K) |
| Solubility in ethanol | soluble |
- Except where otherwise noted, data are given for materials in their standard state (at 25 °C [77 °F], 100 kPa). Infobox references

Sarsasapogenin is a steroidal spirostanol sapogenin, that is the aglycosidic portion of a plant saponin. It is named after sarsaparilla (Smilax sp.), a family of climbing plants found in subtropical regions. It was one of the first sapogenins to be identified, and the first spirostan steroid to be identified as such. The identification of the spirostan structure, with its ketone spiro acetal functionality, was fundamental in the development of the Marker degradation, which allowed the industrial production of progesterone and other sex hormones from plant steroids.

Sarsasapogenin is unusual in that it has a cis-linkage between rings A and B of the steroid nucleus, as opposed to the more usual trans-linkage found in other saturated steroids. This 5β configuration is biologically significant, as a specific enzyme – sarsasapogenin 3β-glucosyltransferase – is found in several plants for the glycosylation of sarsasapogenin. The (S)-configuration at C-25 is also in contrast to other spirostan sapogenins: the epimer with a (25R)-configuration is known as smilagenin.

Sarsasapogenin has been used as a starting material for the synthesis of other steroids. It has also attracted pharmaceutical interest in its own right, and is found in the rhizome of Anemarrhena asphodeloides, called zhī mǔ (知母) in traditional Chinese medicine, from which it is extracted commercially.

== Occurrence and isolation ==
Sarsasapogenin is found as a glycoside – with one or more sugar units attached to the hydroxyl group, known as a saponin – in the roots of many species of monocotyledonous plant, in particular:

Smilacaceae

- Smilax sp.
  - Smilax regelii Kilip & C. V. Morton (Honduran sarsaparilla)
    - Smilax ornata Hook.f. (Jamaican sarsaparilla, synonym of S. regelii)
  - Smilax aristolochiifolia Mill. (American sarsaparilla)
  - Smilax aspera L. (Spanish sarsaparilla)
  - Smilax glabra Roxb. (in Chinese, tǔfúlíng 土茯苓)
  - Smilax febrifuga Kunth (Ecuadorian or Peruvian sarsaparilla)

Asparagaceae

- Asparagus sp.

Agavaceae

- Anemarrhena sp.
  - Anemarrhena asphodeloides Bunge (in Chinese, zhī mǔ 知母)
- Yucca sp.
  - Yucca schidigera Roezl ex Ortges (Mojave yucca)
  - Yucca brevifolia Enulm. (Joshua tree)
- Agave sp.

The sarsasapogenin saponin can be extracted from the dried powdered root with 95% ethanol. After removal of the fat from the resulting gum, the glycosidic linkage is hydrolyzed with hydrochloric acid (approx. 2 M) and the resulting crude steroid is recrystallized from anhydrous acetone. The yield of pure sarsasapogenin from 225 kg of Smilax root is reported to be about 450 grams.

== History ==
Sarsasapogenin was first isolated in 1914 from Sarsaparilla root. Although it was known to have three oxygen atoms, of which only one is a hydroxyl group, the structure of the side chain remained unclear for many years. Tschesche and Hagedorn proposed an unreactive double tetrahydrofuran structure based on degradation studies which indicated an ether oxygen atom attached to C-16. The true nature of the side chain – a ketone spiro acetal – was discovered by Russell Marker in 1939, when he succeeded in opening the six-membered pyran ring with acetic anhydride. Marker found that almost the entire side chain could be cleaved in three steps, a process now known as the Marker degradation.

Marker was able to convert sarsasapogenin into pregnane-3,20-diol (a progesterone analogue) and testosterone. However, for large scale production of steroid hormones, it proved more convenient to use diosgenin (extracted from the Mexican yam Dioscorea mexicana) as the starting material, as it contains a double bond in the steroid nucleus.

== Pharmacological interest ==
Sarsasapogenin and its C-25 epimer smilagenin lowered blood sugar and reversed diabetic weight gain in experiments within mice with a mutant diabetes gene (db). Both steroids also halted the decline in muscarinic acetylcholine receptors (mAChRs) in animal models of Alzheimer's disease. In both cases, the effects seem to be specific to the 5β-configuration, the cis-linkage between rings A and B, as diosgenin (with a Δ^{5} double bond which can be hydrogenated in the body) had much lower anti-diabetic activity (and no significant effect on mAChRs) while tigogenin (the 5α-epimer of smilagenin) showed no effect at all in either study.
