= Sarsasapogenin 3β-glucosyltransferase =

Class of enzymes

Sarsasapogenin 3-β-glucosyltransferase

Identifiers
- EC no.: 2.4.1.193
- CAS no.: 117698-14-3

Databases
- IntEnz: IntEnz view
- BRENDA: BRENDA entry
- ExPASy: NiceZyme view
- KEGG: KEGG entry
- MetaCyc: metabolic pathway
- PRIAM: profile
- PDB structures: RCSB PDB PDBe PDBsum
- Gene Ontology: AmiGO / QuickGO
Search
- PMC: articles
- PubMed: articles
- NCBI: proteins

Sarsasapogenin 3β-glucosyltransferase (EC 2.4.1.193) is an enzyme that catalyzes the chemical reaction

sarsasapogenin
+ UDP-glucose
UDP
asparagoside A

The two substrates of this enzyme are sarsasapogenin and UDP-glucose. Its products are asparagoside A (sarsasapogenin 3-O-β-D-glucoside) and uridine diphosphate (UDP).

The enzyme was first isolated from the root of the common asparagus (Asparagus officinalis). It is specific for substrate sterols with the uncommon 5β-configuration (sarsasapogenin and smilagenin), that is with a cis-linkage between the A and B rings of the steroid nucleus.

This enzyme belongs to the family of glycosyltransferases, specifically the hexosyltransferases. The systematic name of this enzyme class is UDP-glucose:(3β,5β,25S)-spirostan-3-ol 3-O-β-D-glucosyltransferase. This enzyme is also called uridine diphosphoglucose-sarsasapogenin glucosyltransferase.
