= Anna Johnson Julian =

African-American sociologist and civic activist

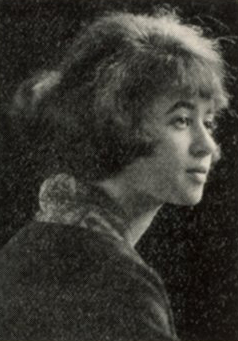
- Johnson in 1923
- Born: Anna Roselle Johnson; November 24, 1901; Baltimore, Maryland, US
- Died: July 3, 1994 (aged 92)
- Education: University of Pennsylvania
- Known for: First African-American woman to earn a PhD in sociology; President, Delta Sigma Theta (1929–1931)
- Spouses: Robert Thompson; Percy Lavon Julian
- Children: Percy Julian Jr; Faith Roselle Julian; Leon R. Ellis
- Scientific career
- Fields: Sociology; Education; Civic activism
- Workplaces: Department of Research, Washington Public Schools; University of the District of Columbia; Julian Laboratories Inc.
- Thesis: Standards of relief an analysis of one hundred family case records (1937)
- Doctoral advisor: W. Rex Crawford

Anna Johnson Julian, born Anna Roselle Johnson (November 24, 1903 – July 3, 1994) was the first African-American woman awarded a Ph.D. in sociology by the University of Pennsylvania (1937), a civic activist, and fourth national president of Delta Sigma Theta, a historically black sorority. In the 1930s, Julian studied factors inhibiting children's education and taught sociology at the University of the District of Columbia then known as Miner Teachers College. Her doctoral work was an analysis of the case records of 100 families receiving income support. She was married to prominent chemist, Percy Lavon Julian, from 1935 to his death in 1975, and had three children. The couple and their children faced down a violent and abusive campaign of intimidation when they moved into an upscale home in Oak Park, Chicago, with attacks on their home, including two fire bombings. The Julians founded the Chicago Chapter of the NAACP Legal Defense and Educational Fund.

Julian was active in a range of civic arenas and faith-based organizations, including serving as chairman of the women's auxiliary of the Chicago Urban League and vice president of a national African-American women's civic organization. In 1963, she was appointed by the state governor to a Commission on Birth Control, which advised the state legislature on the issue of state-sponsored birth control for women receiving state aid. In the 1970s and 1980s, she was a board member of Rosary College (now Dominican University), retiring as president in 1985. Julian died in Oak Park at the age of 90, having received numerous honors, including honorary doctorates from three universities.

== Early life and education ==
Anna Roselle Johnson was born on November 24, 1903, in Baltimore, Maryland. Her parents were Adelaide Scott Johnson and Charles Speare Johnson (a chiropodist), and she was the fifth of their seven daughters.

Johnson contracted rheumatic fever as a young child, and was unable to start school until the third grade. At age 12, she moved to Philadelphia to live with her aunt and uncle so she could attend a racially integrated high school with higher academic standards than available in her home town, West Philadelphia High School.

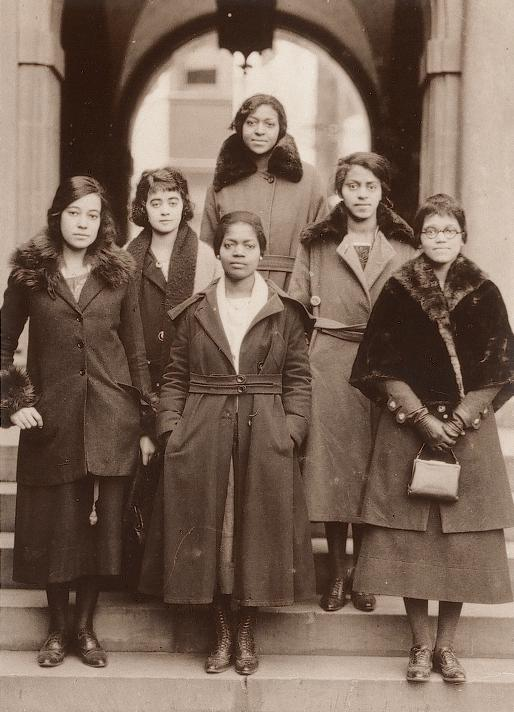
Members at 1921 national Delta Sigma Theta convention (l to r): front, Virginia Margaret Alexander, Julia Mae Polk, Sadie Tanner Mossell; row 2, Anna R. Johnson, Nellie Rathbone Bright; back, Pauline Alice Young

In 1919, Johnson began studying for a Bachelor of Science in Education degree at the University of Pennsylvania, joining the sorority, Delta Sigma Theta, later serving as its fourth national president from 1929 to 1931. During her tenure the sorority incorporated nationally. She was succeeded as DST president by Gladys Byram Shepperd.

Johnson attained her bachelor's degree in 1923, and she entered the postgraduate program in sociology the next year. She earned her master's degree in sociology in 1925.

== Career ==
In June 1925 Julian became a case worker for the Family Service Association in Washington, DC, a private relief agency. In 1928 and 1929 she spent some time teaching in Bordentown, New Jersey, and then worked as a research assistant in the Public Schools of Washington's Department of Research, studying the factors that inhibit children's education. She also taught sociology at Miner Teachers College.

In 1931, Julian enrolled in graduate school at the University of Pennsylvania, continuing to work in DC as she pursued further study, attending classes in Philadelphia. She was awarded a Bloomfield Moore Fellowship, a fellowship for women planning to become teachers to undertake research.

Julian passed a preliminary PhD examination in 1935. Her doctoral work involved studying the case records of 100 families receiving income support from the Family Service Association. She was awarded her PhD in 1937, the first African-American woman to earn a doctoral degree in sociology. Her dissertation was titled Standards of Relief: An Analysis of One Hundred Family Case Records.

In 1939, Julian left her job in DC to join her husband in Chicago, becoming a lifelong civic activist. The Julians established Julian Laboratories in 1953, and she worked as vice president and book-keeper of the enterprise while her children were young. The business was scientifically and commercially successful, specializing in synthesizing hormones in bulk. Previously, Percy Julian had pioneered the synthesis of corticosteroids among other scientific accomplishments.

In 1963, Julian was appointed by the Illinois State Governor, Otto Kerner, to the Birth Control Commission, which reported to the Illinois General Assembly in 1965. The commission had 15 members, advising on the "legal, social and moral" aspects of state-sponsored birth control to women receiving state aid. Julian was an Illinois delegate to the 1970 White House Conference on Children. In the 1970s and 1980s, she served on the board of the Rosary College (now Dominican University), including two terms as chairman, retiring in 1985.

Her other civic contributions included serving as Chairman of the Women's Division of the Chicago Urban League, vice president of the YWCA in Chicago, a member of the women's board of the University of Chicago, and a member of the board of trustees of MacMurray College and the Erikson Institute of Early Childhood Education. Julian was also treasurer, then vice president, of Links Inc, an African-American organization dedicated to community welfare. Anna and Percy Julian founded the Chicago chapter of the NAACP's Legal Defense and Educational Fund. She was also a member of the American Sociological Society (now American Sociological Association) and the American Association of University Women.

== Personal life ==
Anna was married to Robert Thompson when she met Percy Lavon Julian. Racial barriers had prevented Percy Julian's appointment to a position at his alma mater, DePauw University, and elsewhere. Robert Thompson and Percy Julian worked together at Howard University, but Anna and Percy's affair in part led to both Thompson and Julian having to leave Howard in 1932. Percy and Anna married on December 24, 1935. Not yet financially established, Anna Julian continued to live and work in Washington, D.C. while pursuing her PhD in sociology at the University of Pennsylvania, while her husband took a position in Chicago. When they began to live together, she found, "Science can be a hard taskmaster. Dinner can be at seven or 11, as far as the true disciple of chemistry is concerned." Both of them were committed to similar goals and values, and were later described by newspapers as a "power couple".

They had two children, Faith Roselle Julian and Percy Julian Jr (an attorney), and also raised Anna's nephew, Leon "Rhoddy" Ellis.

In 1950, the couple bought a 15-room house in the upscale, white neighborhood Oak Park, Chicago, a community that "Ernest Hemingway, a native son, once referred to as the village of 'broad lawns and narrow minds'." The couple and their children faced a sustained, violent campaign to stop them from living there. She later said: "We were pioneers facing the wilderness...only for us, it was a human wilderness – growing from bigotry." The town at first refused to switch the water on to the home, and the couple received threats. At the end of November, while the house and grounds were being prepared, someone doused the inside with gasoline and then threw a fire bomb inside, which exploded but fortunately failed to ignite the fumes. The house was placed under guard, but there was another bombing attempt the next June. While the Julian children were at home, dynamite was thrown from a car, but fell short of the house. The couple refused to be intimidated. Percy Julian said, "The right of a people to live where they want to, without fear, is more important than science."

Julian spent the rest of her life in the Oak Park home, and lived to see her husband honored locally with a junior high school named after him in 1985. She died in an Oak Park hospital on July 3, 1994.

== Honors and awards ==
- Phi Beta Kappa, University of Pennsylvania.
- Rita Johnson Humanitarian Award from the Family Service & Mental Health Center of Oak Park and River Forest.
- The Julians were cited the Chicago Chapter of the NAACP Legal Defense and Educational Fund for their contributions to justice (1973).
- Honorary doctorates from DePauw University (1987), Rosary College (1993), and MacMurray College (1994).
- 2006 Exhibition, "From Dreams to Determination: The Legacy of Drs Percy and Anna Julian", DuSable Museum of African-American History.
