= Romex system =

Bidding system

The Romex system is a contract bridge bidding system designed by Mexican bridge expert George Rosenkranz. Key features of Romex are the multiple meanings attributed to certain bids, such as the dynamic one notrump and the Mexican two diamonds.

== Dynamic one notrump ==
The dynamic one notrump opening indicates either:

- a balanced or unbalanced hands in the range of 19-21 high card points (HCP) and six controls, or
- an unbalanced hand just short of a 2♣ opening.

The most common responses to the dynamic one notrump opening are:

- 2♣ – negative (0-5 HCP)
- 2♦ – 6+ HCP, game force.

Higher-level responses indicate control count.

A consequence of the use of the dynamic notrump is that the 1NT rebid by opener becomes wide-range (typically 12-16 hcp). With game invitational values or better, responder reacts to such a rebid with a 2♣ checkback convention to ask opener to further describe his hand.

== Mexican two diamonds ==
This opening indicates one of four hands:

- a balanced hand with 21-22 points and seven controls
- a balanced hand with 27-28 points and 10 controls
- an unbalanced game-forcing hand with diamonds as the longest suit or
- a three-suited game-force hand.

== Other calls ==
One-level and 2♣ openings are as per Standard American with 3+ minors and 5+ majors and limited by the failure to open one notrump.

Romex employs special asking bids in lieu of cuebidding, and for slam investigation.
