= Mexican barbasco trade =

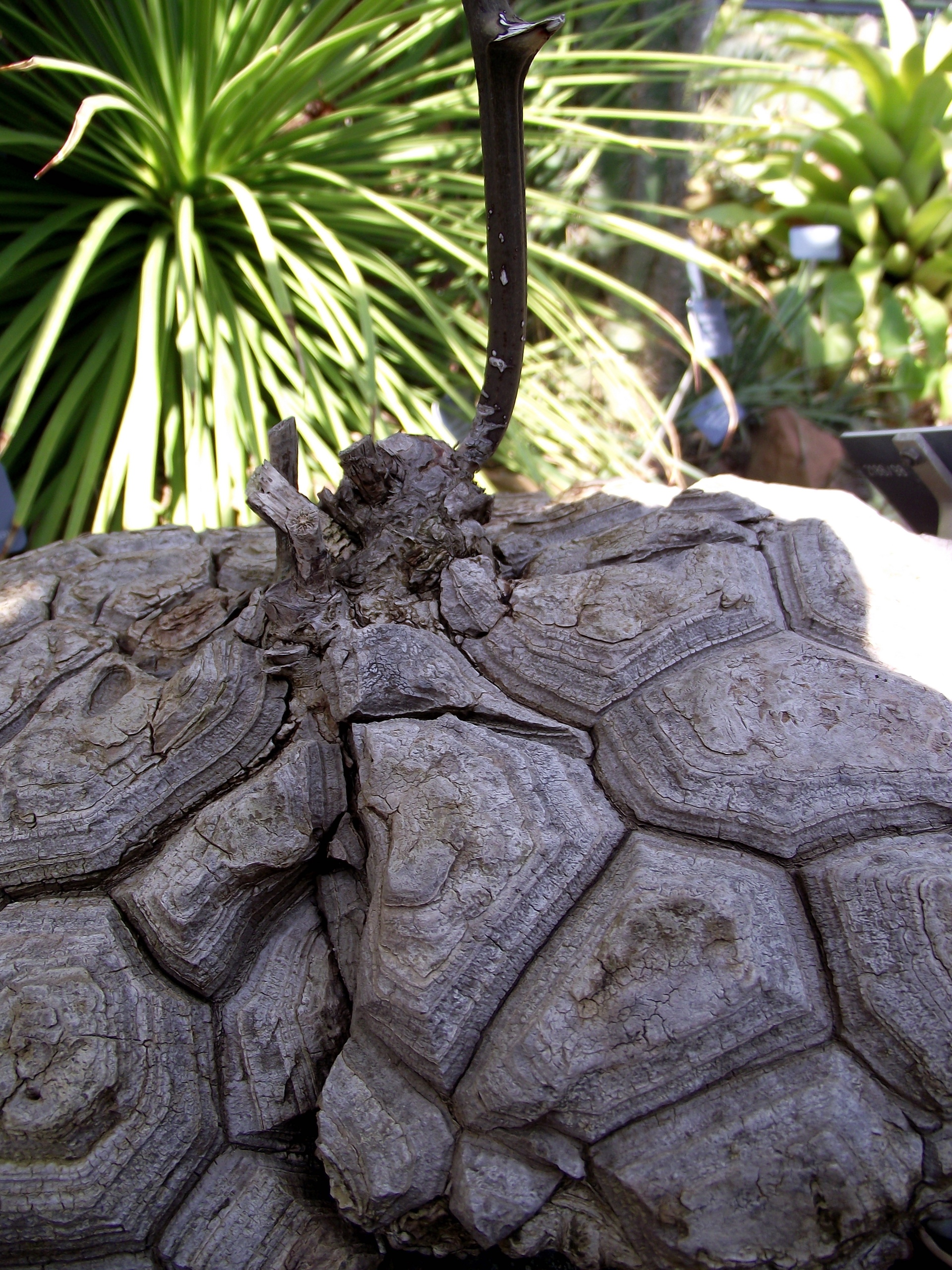
Root of barbasco Dioscorea mexicana

The Mexican barbasco trade was the trade of the diosgenin-rich yam species Dioscorea mexicana, Dioscorea floribunda and Dioscorea composita which emerged in Mexico in the 1950s as part of the Mexican steroid industry. The trade consisted in Mexican campesinos harvesting the root in the jungle, selling it to middlemen who brought it to processing plants where the root was fermented and the diosgenin extracted and sold to pharmaceutical companies such as Syntex who used it to produce synthetic hormones.

== History ==
=== Scientific discovery of medicinal properties ===
The trade started when Russell Marker, a chemist looking for a plant source from which to extract diosgenin and saponin, traveled to Veracruz looking for the yam Dioscorea mexicana which he suspected might be suitable. He hired two Mexican campesinos to bring him exemplars of the tuber. When he discovered that the root was indeed a significant source of diosgenin, he established Syntex, the first Mexican fine chemical company dedicated to producing semisynthetic hormones from Barbasco. Before this development, natural hormones were extracted from animal sources, such as urine from pregnant mares or women, or from bull testes; prices were consequently very high. With the development of the process of Marker degradation which allowed the production of hormones from vegetable saponin sources, Marker began a search for a plant steroid of the sapogenin class with a ring structure more like progesterone. With the discovery of the chemical properties of the barbasco root, world market prices for steroids and other synthetic hormones plummeted, making them feasible for large-scale production of medicines for common ailments such as arthritis or Addison's disease, and eventually as the basis for the combined oral contraceptive pill.

=== The development of the industry ===
This development sparked a barbasco extraction industry centered on the barbasco-rich areas of southeastern Mexico, in Northern Oaxaca, Southern Veracruz and Puebla states. Especially the area called Chinantla in Northern Oaxaca, around the cities of Tuxtepec and Valle Nacional. The root was extracted in the wild by barbasqueros, often poor Indigenous Chinantecs, who ventured into the jungle to dig out the tuber with digging sticks or with their bare hands. Before becoming used industrially, the tuber was used by Chinantec healers in northern Oaxaca as an abortifacient and in cures for aching joints. It was also used by Chinantecs as a poison for fishing in the Papaloapan river.

By the mid-1970s, 125,000 Mexican peasants depended on the barbasco trade for their livelihood, and ten tons of barbasco per week were extracted from the wild.

Quickly, a system of middlemen appeared, as those who had enough means to pay barbasqueros, started buying large quantities, often using a system of debt peonage. They would start by giving the barbasquero a loan, which he or she would then have to pay off with barbasco. These middlemen would eventually establish acopios, recollection and distribution centers where large quantities of barbasco are gathered and shipped on to the beneficios, the processing plants.

=== The production process ===
At the processing plants, the tuber is inspected, washed, chopped up, and mixed with water to produce a thick paste. The paste is then put into fermentation vats, where it remains for several days, after which it is taken out and sun-dried on a concrete floor, where it is turned by workers using rakes. In the process of drying, the paste crystallizes into diosgenin granules, also called flour. The flour is then bagged and sent to laboratories where the diosgenin content is measured and the price is calculated based on the diosgenin percentage, which varies from 4–6%.

Knowledge of the uses and purposes of the barbasco tuber was highly stratified, and barbasqueros often did not know the true purpose of the root they were gathering; they were frequently told that it was used for soap. The acopio owners knew more about the process and eventually invented ways of improving the diosgenin concentration in roots collected by adding different solvents to the tubers before shipping them to the beneficios.

=== End of the barbasco era ===
In the late 1970s, populist President Luis Echeverría sought to organize and nationalize the barbasco trade in order to provide more benefits to the barbasqueros and to the Mexican state. He established the organization PROQUIVEMEX (Productos Químicos Vegetales de México). However, at this point, Mexico had lost its status as a world leader in the synthetic hormone market, and the barbasco trade was declining, just as the root was becoming depleted in the wild.

Also during the 1970s, it became possible to produce steroids from soy phytosterols, including progesterone. This meant that barbasco was no longer necessary as a base product, and international reliance on Mexican yams stopped. Today, only a few communities in Northern Oaxaca continue to produce barbasco, and the few existing beneficios process only a few tons per year. In 1999, 65% of families in the municipio of Santiago Jocotepec depended on barbasco production, whereas in the municipios of San Juan Lalana it was 29.2%, in San Felipe Usila 28.3%, and in San Lucas Ojitlán 24.4%.
