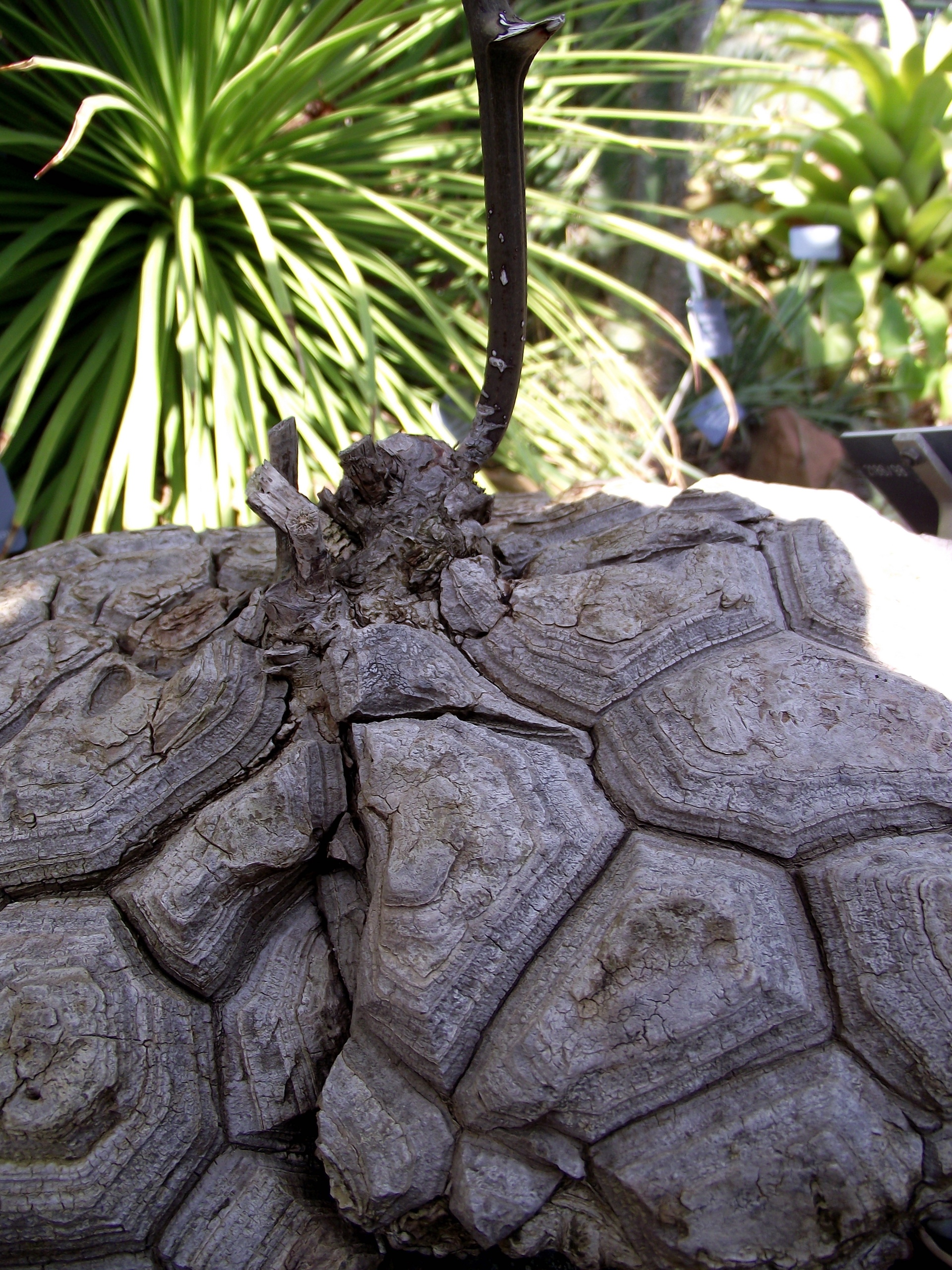

Scientific classification
- Kingdom: Plantae
- Clade: Embryophytes
- Clade: Tracheophytes
- Clade: Spermatophytes
- Clade: Angiosperms
- Clade: Monocots
- Order: Dioscoreales
- Family: Dioscoreaceae
- Genus: Dioscorea
- Species: D. mexicana

Binomial name
- Dioscorea mexicana Scheidw.

Synonyms
- Dioscorea macrostachya Benth.; Dioscorea macrophylla M.Martens & Galeotti; Dioscorea deppei Schiede ex Schltdl.; Dioscorea bilbergiana Kunth; Dioscorea leiboldiana Kunth; Dioscorea propinqua Hemsl.; Testudinaria cocolmeca Procop.; Dioscorea astrostigma Uline; Dioscorea macrostachya var. sessiliflora Uline; Dioscorea tuerckheimii R.Knuth; Dioscorea anconensis R.Knuth; Dioscorea deamii Matuda; Dioscorea mexicana var. sessiliflora (Uline) Matuda; Testudinaria macrostachya (Benth.) G.D.Rowley

= Dioscorea mexicana =

Mexican yam

Species of herbaceous vine

Dioscorea mexicana, Mexican yam or cabeza de negro is a species of yam in the genus Dioscorea.

Dioscorea mexicana is a caudiciform dioscorea having either a partly to completely above-ground dome-shaped caudex with a thick, woody outer layer up to 3 feet (90 cm) in diameter and 8–10 inches (20 to 25 cm) in height. The caudex of D. mexicana is divided into regular polygonal plates that become protuberant with age, and separated by deep fissures. The vigorous annual vines which may reach 30 feet (9 m) long before dying back in winter, that grow up from the caudex, bear heart-shaped leaves.

Dioscorea mexicana ranges from the state of San Luis Potosí in northeastern Mexico south to Panama. It is notable for its production of diosgenin, which is a precursor for the synthesis of hormones such as progesterone. Russell Marker developed the extraction and manufacture of hormones from D. mexicana at Syntex. Later the Mexican barbasco trade focused instead on Dioscorea composita instead, as this variety has a higher diosgenin content.
