= Luis E. Miramontes =

Mexican chemist

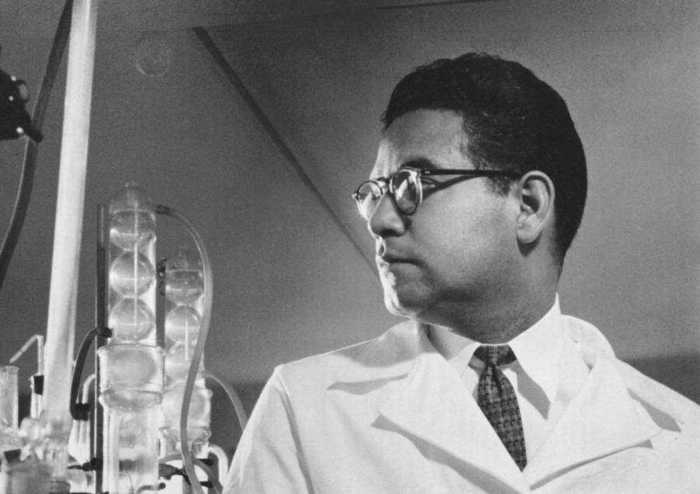
- Luis E. Miramontes c. 1953
- Born: Luis Ernesto Miramontes Cárdenas; 16 March 1925; Tepic, Nayarit, Mexico
- Died: 13 September 2004 (aged 79); Mexico City, Mexico
- Education: National Autonomous University of Mexico
- Known for: Synthesis of norethisterone, the progestin used in one of the first oral contraceptives
- Awards: Mexican National Prize in Chemistry (1986); Top Chemical Engineer of all times (2011)
- Scientific career
- Fields: Chemistry, chemical engineering
- Workplaces: Syntex; G. D. Searle & Company; National Autonomous University of Mexico; Universidad Iberoamericana; Mexican Institute of Petroleum

Luis Ernesto Miramontes Cárdenas (March 16, 1925 – September 13, 2004) was a Mexican chemist known as co-inventor and the first to synthesize an oral contraceptive, progestin norethisterone.

== Career summary ==
Miramontes was born in Tepic, Nayarit. He obtained his first Degree in chemical engineering at the Universidad Nacional Autónoma de México (UNAM). He was a founding researcher of the Institute of Chemistry of UNAM, specializing mainly in the area of Organic Chemistry. He was a professor of the Faculty of Chemistry of UNAM, Director and professor of the School of Chemistry at the Universidad Iberoamericana, and deputy director of research at the Mexican Institute of Petroleum (IMP). Miramontes was a member the American Chemical Society (Emeritus), the Mexican Institute of Chemical Engineers, the National Institute of Chemical and Chemical Engineers, the Chemical Society of Mexico, the American Institute of Chemical Engineers and the New York Academy of Sciences. He died in Mexico City in 2004.

The scientific contributions of Luis Miramontes are extensive, including numerous publications and nearly 40 national and international patents in different areas such as organic chemistry, pharmaceutical chemistry, petrochemistry and atmospheric chemistry and polluting agents.

== First synthesis of an oral contraceptive ==
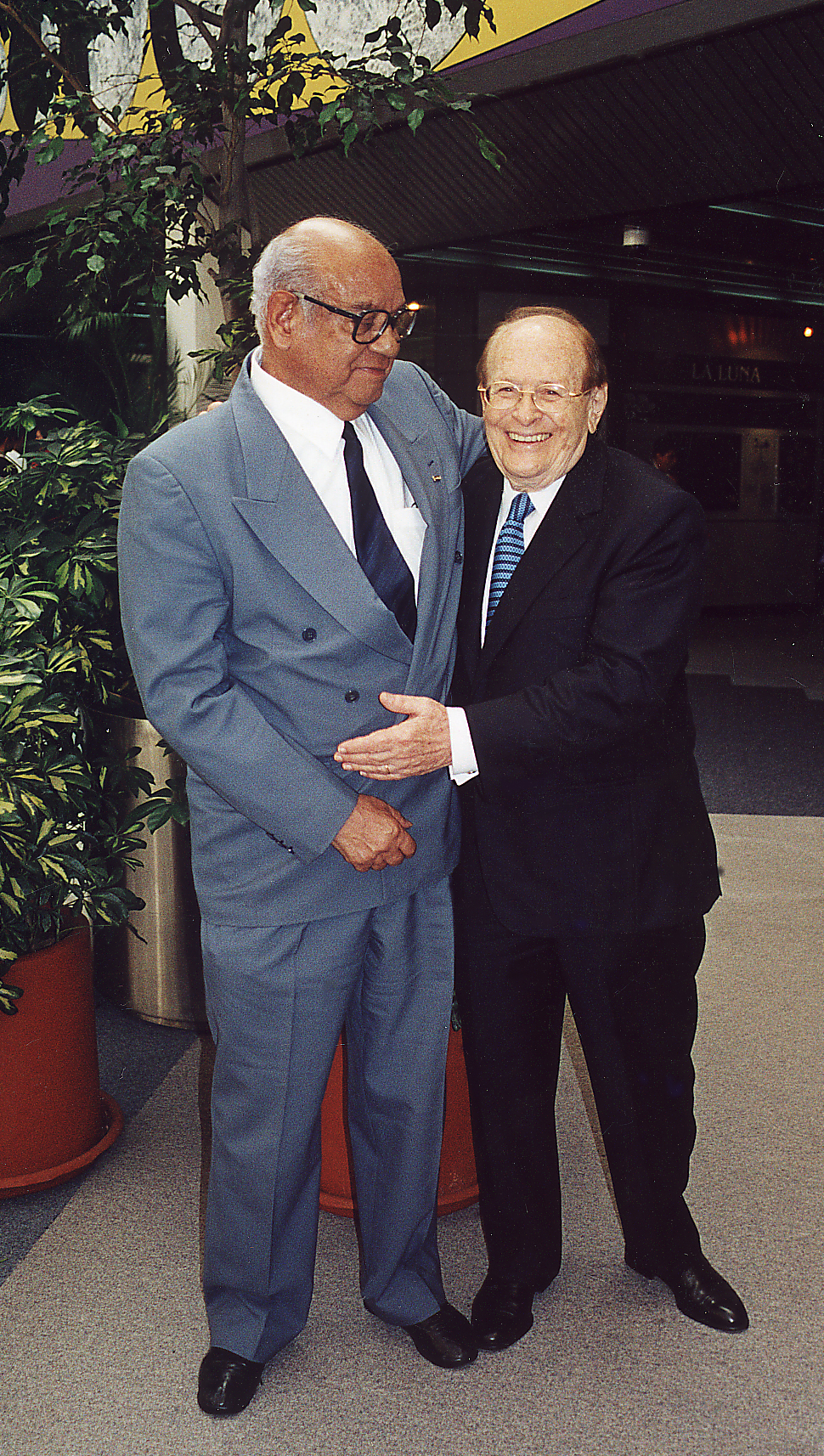
George Rosenkranz (right) and Luis E. Miramontes (left), 2001 at the UNAM

On October 15, 1951, under the supervision of Carl Djerassi and the direction of George Rosenkranz at Syntex laboratory in Mexico City, Miramontes completed the first ever synthesis of an oral contraceptive: progestin norethisterone.

While Djerassi is sometimes regarded as 'Father of the Pill'". it was Miramontes, working under Djerassi's supervision, that achieved the first synthesis. In the words of Djerassi, "On 15 October 1951, Luis Miramontes, a young Mexican chemist doing his undergraduate bachelor's thesis work at Syntex completed the synthesis of the 19-nor-17α-ethynyltestosterone or, for short 'norethisterone'—which turned out to be the first oral contraceptive to be synthesized." Nobel Laureate Max Perutz added "the chemistry student Luis Miramontes, working under the direction of Djerassi and the director of the laboratory Jorge Rosenkranz synthesized the compound". The last step of the synthesis method was registered on page 114 of the Miramontes's personal laboratory notebook (signed).

All three Miramontes, Djerassi, and Rosenkranz are listed on the patent as co-inventors.

== Recognition ==
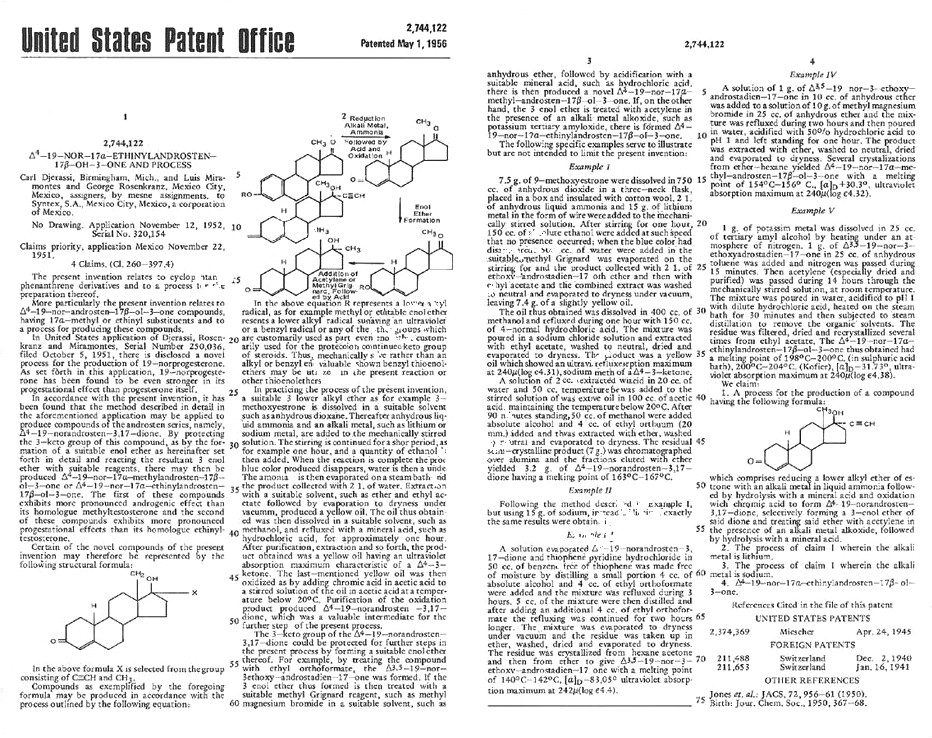
Patent of the first oral contraceptive, elected to the USA Inventors Hall of Fame.

- In 1964, the contraceptive pill was chosen by the US Department of Patents as one of the 40 registered more important inventions between 1794 and 1964. The name of Luis Miramontes appeared next to Pasteur, Edison, Bell, the Wright brothers and others of equal stature. It was included in the "USA Inventors Hall of Fame".
- In 1985 he received the "Estado de Mexico" Medal, in the area of sciences and arts; as well as a public recognition from the government of the state of Nayarit, and an academic recognition from the Technological Institute of Tepic.
- He received the Mexican National Prize on Chemistry "Andrés Manuel del Rio" in 1986.
- In 1989 he became a "pugwashite", that is, member of the Pugwash Conferences on Science and World Affairs, organization promoting peace and world development, after attending the 39th Pugwash Conference: Building Global Security through Cooperation held at Cambridge, USA. The Pugwash Conferences were awarded the Peace Nobel Prize in 1995.
- In 1992 the General Hospital of Zone no. 1, of the Mexican Institute of Social Security, in Tepic, Nayarit, was named "Luis Ernesto Miramontes Cardenas Hospital".
- In 1994 the Mexican Ministry of Health recognized his scientific contributions, when installing the National Program on Family Planning in Mexico.
- He received in 1998, on behalf of the government of the state of Nayarit, the "Amado Nervo" Medal.

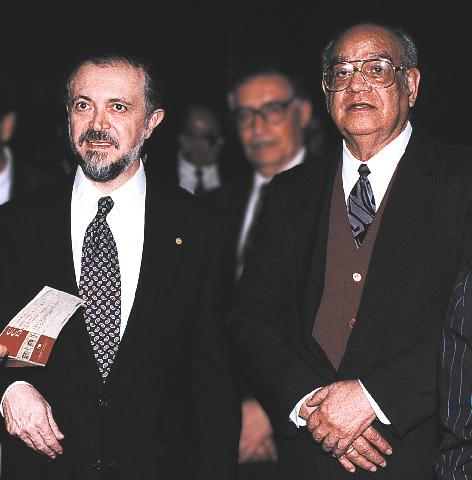
Luis E. Miramontes (right) with Nobel Laureate Mario Molina, ca. 1995

- In 2000, the contraceptive pill was denominated three times as one of the most important inventions of the last 2000 years, by a group of outstanding persons, that included several Nobel laurates.
- In 2001, at the 50th Anniversary of the synthesis of norethisterone, the UNAM and the Mexican Ministry of Health, organized individual tributes to Miramontes and Rosencraz.
- In 2003, norethisterone was considered one of the most important 17 molecules that have influenced the history of humankind.
- In 2004, the invention of Luis E. Miramontes was chosen as the twentieth most important one of all the times. The election was organized by SCENTA, an initiative of The Engineering and Technology Board of the United Kingdom.
- In 2005, the Mexican Academy of Sciences, named the invention of Miramontes as the Mexican most important contribution to world science ever.
- In 2009, the BBC of London nominated him as one of the five most important Latin American researchers of all the times
- In 2009, The School of Chemistry of UNAM recognized him as one of the most successful and important scientists to have received a degree from it
- In 2009, The School of Chemistry of UNAM honored him by naming the 2009 year prize QUIMIUNAM after him.
- In 2010, TCE Today, published by the IChemE regarded him "one of the chemical engineers who changed the world"
- In 2010, The Innovators of America initiative nominated him a top Icon & Legend of America
- In 2011 was named one of the world's most influential chemical engineers of all time by the IChemE (Institution of Chemical Engineers).
- In 2011, The Mexican Institute of Chemical Engineers IMIQ named after him the Prize "Ing. Luis Ernesto Miramontes Cárdenas" aimed to recognize outstanding Mexicans in Chemical Engineering R&D.

Luis E. Miramontes, Andrés Manuel del Río (discoverer of vanadium) and Mario Molina, Chemistry Nobel Prize in 1995, are the three most important Mexican chemists of all time.

== Selected publications ==
- Miramontes L; Rosenkranz G; Djerassi C. 1951 Journal of the American Chemical Society 73 (7): 3540–3541 Steroids .22. The Synthesis of 19-Nor-Progesterone doi:10.1021/ja00007a060
- Sandoval A; Miramontes L; Rosenkranz G; Djerassi C. 1951 Journal of the American Chemical Society 73 (3): 990–991. The dienone–phenol rearrangement doi:10.1021/ja01147a029
- Sandoval A; Miramontes L; Rosenkranz G; Djerassi C; Sondheimer F. 1953 Journal of the American Chemical Society 75 (16): 4117–4118 Steroids .69. 19-Nor-Desoxycorticosterone, A Potent Mineralocorticoid Hormone doi:10.1021/ja01112a544
- Mancera O; Miramontes L; Rosenkranz G; Sondheimer F; Djerassi C. 1953 Journal of the American Chemical Society 75 (18): 4428–4429 Steroidal Sapogenins .28. The Reaction of Peracids With Enol Acetates of Delta-8-7-Keto and Delta-8-11-Keto Steroidal Sapogenins doi:10.1021/ja01114a009
- Djerassi C; Miramontes L; Rosenkranz G. 1953 Journal of the American Chemical Society 75 (18): 4440–4442 Steroids .48. 19-Norprogesterone, A Potent Progestational Hormone doi:10.1021/ja01114a013
- Djerassi C; Miramontes L; Rosenkranz G; Sondheimer F. 1954 Journal of the American Chemical Society 76 (16): 4092–4094 Steroids .54. Synthesis of 19-Nor-17-Alpha-Ethynyltestosterone and 19-Nor-17-Alpha-Methyltestosterone doi:10.1021/ja01645a010
- Miramontes L; Aguinaco P; Romero MA. 1960 Journal of the American Chemical Society 82(23): 6153–6155 "Synthesis of 6-Methyl Steroids" doi:10.1021/ja01508a045

== Patented inventions ==
- Carl Djerassi, Luis Miramontes, George Rosenkranz (1956), Delta 4-19-nor-17alpha-ethinylandrosten-17beta-ol-3-one and process, United States Patent 2744122
- Carl Djerassi, Luis Miramontes (1956), Cyclopentanophenanthrene derivatives and compounds, United States Patent 2759951.
- Carl Djerassi, Luis Miramontes, George Rosenkranz (1956), 17alpha-methyl-19-nortesterone, United States Patent 2774777.
- Miramontes Luis E., Romero Miguel A, Ahuad Farjat Fortunato (1959), Preparation of 6-methyl steroids of the pregnane series from diosgenin, United States Patent 2878246.
- Miramontes Luis E., Romero Miguel A, Fritsche O, Preparation of 6-methyl steroids of the pregnane series, United States Patent 2878247.
- Miramontes Luis E. (1959), Procedure for obtaining sapogenins from natural un-dried products, United States Patent 2912362.
- Carl Djerassi, Luis Miramontes, George Rosenkranz (1959), DELTA.4-19-NOR-17.alpha.-ETHINYLANDROSTEN-17.beta.-OL-3 ONE
- Miramontes Luis E., Romero Miguel A (1960), 12alpha-hydroxy-12beta-methyltigogenin and 12-methylene steroids derived therefrom, United States Patent 2954375.
- Miramontes Luis E., Romero Miguel A, Ahuad Farjat Fortunato (1961), 3beta-alkanoyloxy-6-methyl-5,16-pregnadien-20-ones, United States Patent 3000914.
- Miramontes Luis E. (1961), Process for the production of 3beta-hydroxy-16alpha, 17alpha-epoxy-5-pregnen-20-one, United States Patent 3004967.
- Miramontes Luis E. (1961), Resolution of sapogenin mixtures and intermediate products, United States Patent 3013010.
- Miramontes Luis E. (1962), Hecogenin azine and alkyliden-azinotigogenins, United States Patent 3033857.
- Miramontes Luis E., Fritsche Oscar, Romero Miguel A (1963), DEHYDRO-OXYGENATED-6-METHYL-16.alpha.,17.alpha.-EPOXYPREGN-20-ONE-DERIVATIVES
- Miramonte, Luis E., Flores Humberto J (1968), Process for isolation of solanum alkaloids from solanum plants, United States Patent 3385844.
- Miramonte, Luis E. (1972), Process for the conversion of exhaust gases of the internal combustion engines into harmless products, United States Patent 3808805.
- Miramontes Luis E., Castillo Cervantes Salavador, Moran Pineda Florencia M (1996), Catalytically active ceramic monoliths for the reduction of leaded gasoline-fueled engine pollutants and the production thereof, United States Patent 5534475.
