= Syntex =

Mexican pharmaceutical company

Laboratorios Syntex SA (later Syntex Laboratories, Inc.) was a pharmaceutical company formed in Mexico City in January 1944 by Russell Marker, Emeric Somlo, and Federico Lehmann to manufacture therapeutic steroids from the Mexican yams called cabeza de negro (Dioscorea mexicana) and Barbasco (Dioscorea composita). The demand for barbasco by Syntex initiated the Mexican barbasco trade.

As the American Chemistry Society later explained: “In early 1944, the new Mexican company was chartered and named Syntex, S.A. (‘Synthesis and Mexico’). Russell Marker, shortly thereafter, left Syntex on account of his ruthless cofounder.

Luis E. Miramontes, George Rosenkranz and Carl Djerassi's successful synthesis of norethisterone (also known as norethindrone) — which was later proven to be an effective pregnancy inhibitor — led to an infusion of capital into Syntex and the Mexican steroid pharmaceutical industry. George Rosenkranz and Carl Djerassi went on to synthesize cortisone from diosgenin, the same phytosteroid contained in Mexican yams used to synthesize progesterone and norethindrone. The synthesis was more economical than the previous Merck & Co. synthesis, which started with bile acids.

In 1959, Syntex moved its operating headquarters to Palo Alto, California, United States, and evolved into a transnational corporation. Its foreign scientists had become frustrated with bureaucratic delays on the part of the Mexican government in granting work visas and approving necessary imports of pharmaceutical materials for their work. After 1959, Syntex was incorporated in Panama; its administration, research and marketing were conducted from Palo Alto; its manufacturing of bulk steroid intermediates remained in Mexico; and it also manufactured finished drugs at plants in Puerto Rico and the Bahamas.

Syntex agreed to be acquired by the Roche group in May 1994. After the acquisition closed, Roche downsized Syntex's research and development facilities in the Stanford Research Park and finally shut down what was left of Syntex in September 2008. In 2011, VMware moved into the former Syntex campus in Palo Alto.

== Prominent researchers ==
- Russell Marker co-founded the company in 1944. In May 1945, realizing that he was being left out of the company's profits, he left the company. When Marker took his notebooks with him, production was severely hampered because he had done the synthesis himself and had coded the reagent bottles.
- George Rosenkranz had studied at the Swiss Federal Institute of Technology and was conducting pharmaceutical research in Cuba. He joined Syntex in 1945 to replace Marker. He hired Djerassi in 1949.
- Carl Djerassi went to work at Syntex in 1949 as the associate director of chemical research. He remained there through 1951, leaving to join the faculty of the Chemistry Department at Wayne State University (Detroit, Michigan) starting in 1952. He later returned to the company in 1957, was involved in the company's move to Palo Alto (where he had become a professor of chemistry at Stanford in 1960), and stayed around this time until 1972.
- Alejandro Zaffaroni developed procedures for identifying and separating steroids using paper chromatography while studying at the University of Rochester, and joined Syntex as a research biochemist in 1951. He became vice-president in 1956, and was appointed president of Syntex's U.S. subsidiary in Palo Alto, California in 1962.
- Luis E. Miramontes moved from UNAM to Syntex in 1950 as a researcher under Djerassi. Under the direction of Djerassi and Rosenkranz, he performed the last step of the first synthesis of an orally highly active progestin on 15 October 1951. The semi-synthetic steroid, norethisterone (19-Nor-17-alpha-ethynyltestosterone), was the first orally highly active progestin, which led to the development of the first oral contraceptive pills.
- Albert Bowers joined Syntex, in 1956 as research group leader; went on to publish more than 90 scientific papers on steroid research and originated more than 120 U.S. patents. Bowers became president of Syntex in 1976, was chief executive officer from 1980 to 1989 and had served as chairman of the board, 1981-1990.
- Jerzy Rzedowski worked as an explorer botanist. He later became the most prominent plant scientist in Mexico.
- Ralph Dorfman Joined the company as a consultant in 1960, eventually serving as President of Syntex Research from 1967–1973

== Birth control pill ==
Syntex submitted its compound to a laboratory in Madison, Wisconsin, for biological evaluation, and found it was the most active, orally-effective progestational hormone of its time. Syntex submitted a patent application in November 1951. In August 1953, G.D. Searle & Co. filed for a patent for the synthesis of the double-bond isomer 13 of norethindrone called noretynodrel. Noretynodrel is converted into norethisterone under acidic conditions, such as those in the human stomach, and the new patent did not infringe on the Syntex patent. Searle obtained approval to market noretynodrel before Syntex received its approval. By 1964 three companies, including Syntex, G.D. Searle, and Johnson & Johnson under the Ortho Pharmaceutical brand, were marketing 2-mg doses of the Syntex norethindrone.

== Scientific misconduct ==
Syntex's submission of a fraudulent toxicology analysis of naproxen largely led to the Food and Drug Administration's uncovering of extensive scientific misconduct by Industrial Bio-Test Laboratories in 1976.

== Controversies ==
An investigation by several animal protection NGOs shows that Syntex is involved in the export of Equine Chorionic Gonadotropin produced in South America by laboratory mares kept by bloodstock farms, all under conditions of animal cruelty, including live abortions, beatings, and lack of veterinary care.
