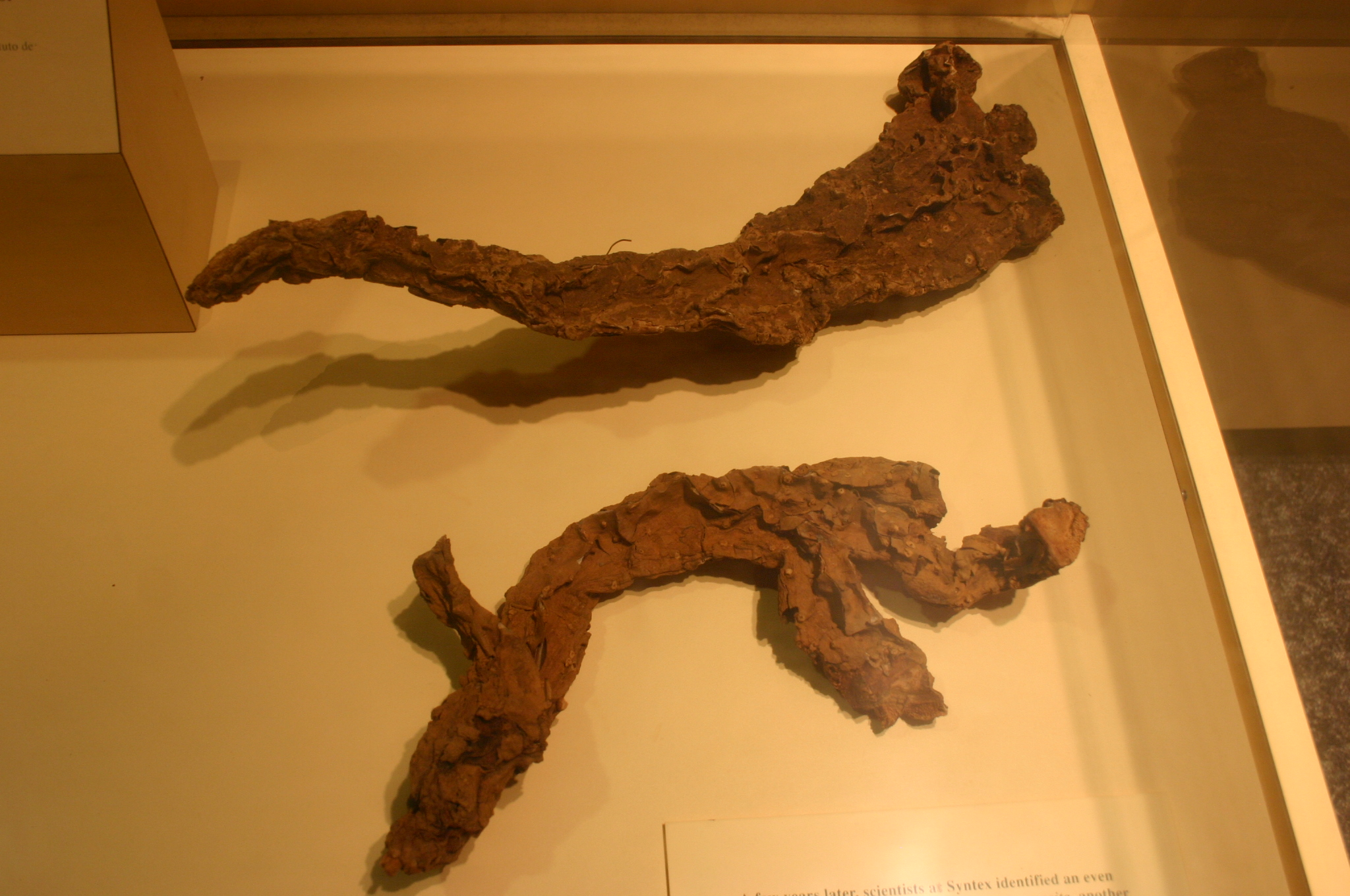
- Dioscorea composita

Scientific classification
- Kingdom: Plantae
- Clade: Embryophytes
- Clade: Tracheophytes
- Clade: Spermatophytes
- Clade: Angiosperms
- Clade: Monocots
- Order: Dioscoreales
- Family: Dioscoreaceae
- Genus: Dioscorea
- Species: D. composita

Binomial name
- Dioscorea composita Hemsl.

Synonyms
- Dioscorea tepinapensis Uline ex R.Knuth; Dioscorea tepinapensis var. aggregata Uline ex R.Knuth

= Dioscorea composita =

Species of yam

Dioscorea composita, or barbasco, is a species of yam in the family Dioscoreaceae. It is native to Mexico. It is notable for its role in the production of diosgenin, which is a precursor for the synthesis of hormones such as progesterone. Russell Marker developed the extraction and manufacture of hormones from D. mexicana at Syntex, starting the trade of D. composita in Mexico. Marker also discovered that the composita variety had a much higher content of diosgenin than the mexicana variety, and therefore it came to replace the latter in the production of synthetic hormones.

== Medicinal use ==
It chemically consists of steroidal sapogenin, diosgenin which is used to prepare synthetic hormones such as progesterone and cortisone. Diosgenin extracted from Dioscorea composita was instrumental in the development of the combined oral contraceptive pill in the 1960s – and also for the development of cortisone treatments of arthritis. Studies on Diosgenin say that it has effect on diabetic neuropathy.

Before becoming used industrially the tuber was used by Chinantec healers in northern Oaxaca as an abortifacient and in cures for aching joints. It was also used by chinantecs as a poison for fishing in the Papaloapan river, and is also mentioned in use for this purpose in the Popol Vuh, the sacred book of the K'iche maya.
