= Russell Earl Marker =

American chemist (1902–1995)

- Born: March 12, 1902; Hagerstown, Maryland, U.S.
- Died: March 3, 1995 (aged 92); Wernersville, Pennsylvania, U.S.
- Education: University of Maryland
- Known for: Octane rating
- Scientific career
- Fields: Chemistry
- Institutions: Ethyl Corporation

Russell Earl Marker (March 12, 1902 – March 3, 1995) was an American chemist who invented the octane rating system when he was working at the Ethyl Corporation. Later in his career, he went on to found a steroid industry in Mexico when he successfully made semisynthetic progesterone from chemical constituents found in Mexican yams in a process known as Marker degradation. This eventually led to the development at Syntex of the combined oral contraceptive pill and synthetic cortisone – and to the development of the Mexican barbasco trade.

== Biography ==
He was born on March 12, 1902, in Hagerstown, Maryland. He received his B.S. in 1923 from the University of Maryland and an M.S. in physical chemistry in 1924 from the same institution.

In 1926, he married Mildred Collins (1899–1985) and worked as an analytical chemist at the Naval Powder Factory in Indian Head, Maryland. He then began work at the Ethyl Corporation where he came up with the concept of the octane rating.

In 1937 he coauthored the article, "Sterols. X. Cholesterol Derivatives," with Oliver Kamm, George H. Fleming, Alexander H. Popkin, and Eugene L. Wittle in the Journal of the American Chemical Society, April 1, 1937

In 1938, he proposed a new molecular structure for sarsasapogenin where the side chain was chemically reactive due to the two oxygen atoms connected to the same carbon. The newly found reactivity of the side chain can be used to remove most of the atoms in the side chain. After most of the atoms are removed from the side chain, a steroid ring is left. After a few chemical modifications, a steroid ring can lead to the creation of progesterone. This was the first practical synthesis of progesterone. It was also a precursor in the preparation of cortisone.

When Marker found that there was a similar structure to sarsasapogenin in Beth Roots, a member of the lily family, he began his work to develop the Marker degradation.

In March 1944 he formed Syntex. He left the company in May 1945 to found Botanica-Mex. In 1949 he left Botanica-Mex. He died on March 3, 1995 in Wernersville, Pennsylvania after breaking his hip in a fall.

== Marker degradation ==
Emeric Somlo, Federico Lehmann and Russell Marker came together to make a new company in Mexico named Syntex SA. This company used Mexican plant, Cabeza de Negro (Dioscorea mexicana), to create progesterone. Species of the genus Dioscorea contain diosgenin: a saponin similar to the structure of sarsasapogenin found in beth root. In March 1944, the company made the first kilo of progesterone, which was sold at $50/gram. After a dispute in the company in 1945, Marker severed ties with Syntex SA. Because Marker was the only person in the company who knew how to do the synthesis of progesterone, they could no longer produce the drug. Marker however went to work with Botanica-mex, a company based in Texcoco. The company later was sold to Gedeon Richter Ltd. where they started using both cabeza de negro and barbasco (yam) to make progesterone.

Today, progesterone can be used to make cortisone and oral contraceptives.

== Honors ==
- Mexican Chemical Society at the VI International Symposium on the Chemistry of Natural Products in Mexico City (1969)
- Chemical Congress of North America (1975)
- Lecture series in astronomy, astrophysics, chemistry, evolutionary biology, genetics, math, and physical sciences are held annually at Penn State in Russell Marker's honor.
- The University of Maryland Department of Chemistry and Biochemistry presents the Russell E. Marker Outstanding Freshman Award to a single freshman student each year for outstanding academic and laboratory achievement.
