= Diosgenin =

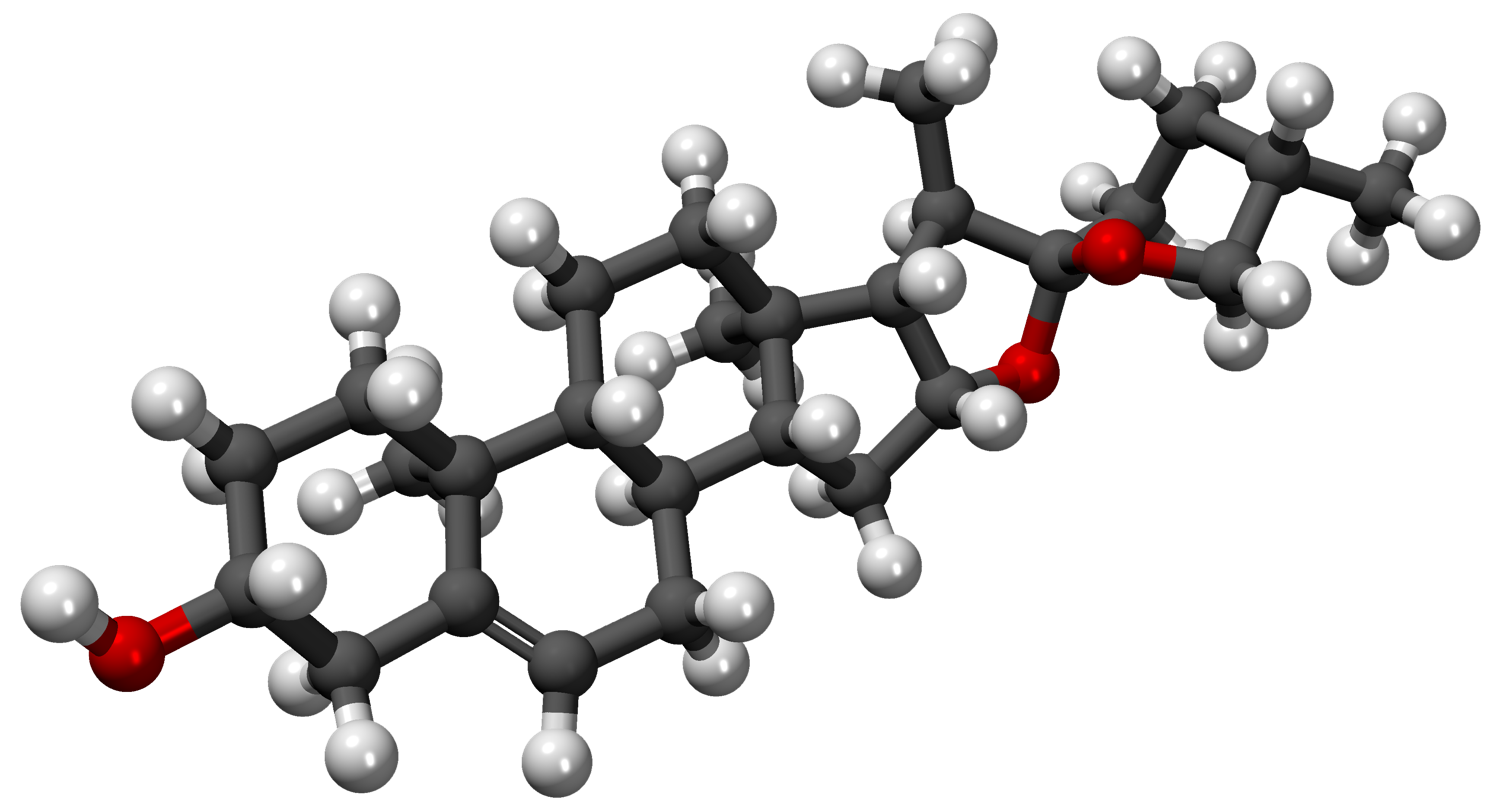

Names
- IUPAC name (25R)-Spirost-5-en-3β-ol
- Systematic IUPAC name (2S,2′R,4aR,4bS,5′R,6aS,6bR,7S,9aS,10aS,10bS)-4′,4a,6a,7-Tetramethyl-1,2,3,4,4a,4b,5,6,6a,6b,7,9a,10,10a,10b,11-hexadecahydrospiro[naphtho[2′,1′:4,5]indeno[2,1-b]furan-8,2′-oxan]-2-ol

Identifiers
CAS Number	512-04-9
3D model (JSmol)	Interactive image
ChEBI	CHEBI:4629
ChEMBL	ChEMBL412437
ChemSpider	89870
ECHA InfoCard	100.007.396
EC Number	208-134-3
PubChem CID	99474
UNII	K49P2K8WLX
CompTox Dashboard (EPA)	DTXSID00895074
- InChI: InChI=1S/C27H42O3/c1-16-7-12-27(29-15-16)17(2)24-23(30-27)14-22-20-6-5-18-13-19(28)8-10-25(18,3)21(20)9-11-26(22,24)4/h5,16-17,19-24,28H,6-15H2,1-4H3/t16-,17+,19+,20-,21+,22+,23+,24+,25+,26+,27-/m1/s1 Key: WQLVFSAGQJTQCK-VKROHFNGSA-N; InChI=1/C27H42O3/c1-16-7-12-27(29-15-16)17(2)24-23(30-27)14-22-20-6-5-18-13-19(28)8-10-25(18,3)21(20)9-11-26(22,24)4/h5,16-17,19-24,28H,6-15H2,1-4H3/t16-,17+,19+,20-,21+,22+,23+,24+,25+,26+,27-/m1/s1 Key: WQLVFSAGQJTQCK-VKROHFNGBS
- SMILES: O1[C@@H]4[C@H]([C@@H]([C@]12OC[C@@H](CC2)C)C)[C@@]5(C)CC[C@@H]3[C@@]6(C(=C/C[C@H]3[C@@H]5C4)\C[C@@H](O)CC6)C

Properties
Chemical formula	C_{27}H_{42}O_{3}
Molar mass	414.630 g·mol^{−1}
- Except where otherwise noted, data are given for materials in their standard state (at 25 °C [77 °F], 100 kPa). verify (what is ?) Infobox references

Diosgenin, a phytosteroid spirostanol sapogenin, is the product of hydrolysis by acids, strong bases, or enzymes of saponins, extracted from the tubers of Dioscorea wild yam species, such as the Kokoro. It is also present in smaller amounts in a number of other species. The sugar-free (aglycone) product of such hydrolysis, diosgenin is used for the commercial synthesis of cortisone, pregnenolone, progesterone, and other steroid products.

== Sources ==
It is present in detectable amounts in Costus speciosus, Smilax menispermoidea, Helicteres isora, species of Paris, Aletris, Trigonella, and Trillium, and in extractable amounts from many species of Dioscorea – D. althaeoides, D. colletti, D. composita, D. floribunda, D. futschauensis, D. gracillima, D. hispida, D. hypoglauca, D. mexicana, D. nipponica, D. panthaica, D. parviflora, D. septemloba, and D. zingiberensis.

== Industrial uses ==
Diosgenin is a chemical precursor for several hormones, starting with the Marker degradation process, which includes synthesis of progesterone. The process was used in the early manufacturing of combined oral contraceptive pills. Diosgenin in dietary supplements is not a physiological precursor to estradiol or progesterone, and the use of such products as wild yam has no estrogenic hormonal activity in the human body.

== See also ==
- List of neurosteroids
  - Spirostanes
