= Tolman Award =

The Tolman Medal is awarded each year by the Southern California Section of the American Chemical Society (SCALACS) for outstanding contributions to chemistry which include contributions in areas of fundamental studies, chemical technology, and significant contributions to chemical education or outstanding leadership in science on a national level. To be eligible for the Medal, the recipient must have accomplished the majority of his or her work while resident in Southern California.

The Medal is named for physicist and chemist Richard C. Tolman.

== Recipients ==
Source: SCALACS

- 1960 William Gould Young
- 1961 Anton Burg
- 1962 Ernest H. Swift
- 1963 W. Conway Pierce
- 1964 Arie J. Haagen-Smit
- 1965 Thomas F. Doumani, Union Oil Company
- 1966 Arthur Adamson, USC
- 1967 Ulric B. Bray, Bray Oil Company
- 1968 Francis E. Blacet, UCLA
- 1969 Robert D. Vold, USC
- 1970 Robert L. Pecsok, UCLA
- 1971 Roland C. Hansford, Union Oil Company
- 1972 James Bonner, Caltech
- 1973 Howard Reiss, UCLA
- 1974 John D. Roberts, Caltech
- 1975 Dr. Corwin Hansch, Pomona College
- 1976 F. Sherwood Rowland, U. C. Irvine
- 1977 Sidney W. Benson, USC
- 1978 Thomas C. Bruice, UCSB
- 1979 Harry B. Gray, Caltech
- 1980 Herbert D. Kaesz, UCLA
- 1981 Paul D. Boyer, UCLA
- 1982 Donald T. Sawyer, UCR
- 1983 James N. Pitts, Air Pollution Research Center, UCR
- 1984 Donald J. Cram, UCLA
- 1985 Arnold O. Beckman, Beckman Instruments, Inc.
- 1986 M. Frederick Hawthorne, UCLA
- 1987 Clifford A. Bunton, UC, Santa Barbara
- 1988 John D. Baldeschwieler, Caltech
- 1989 Mostafa El-Sayed, UCLA
- 1990 Linus Pauling, Caltech
- 1991 George Olah, USC
- 1992 Peter C. Ford, UC Santa Barbara
- 1993 Charles L. Wilkins, UC Riverside
- 1994 Jacqueline K. Barton, Caltech
- 1995 Christopher S. Foote, UCLA
- 1996 Larry R. Dalton, USC
- 1997 Ahmed H. Zewail, Caltech
- 1998 Kendall N. Houk, UCLA
- 1999 Peter B. Dervan, Caltech
- 2000 Dr. William Andrew Goddard III, Caltech
- 2001 Peter M. Rentzepis, UC Irvine
- 2002 Robert H. Grubbs, Caltech
- 2003 Arieh Warshel, USC
- 2004 Christopher Reed, UC Riverside
- 2005 Fred Wudl, UCLA
- 2006 G. K. Surya Prakash, USC Loker Hydrocarbon Research Institute
- 2007 Barbara Finlayson-Pitts, UC Irvine
- 2008 Joan S. Valentine, UCLA
- 2009 Richard B. Kaner, UCLA
- 2010 Dennis A. Dougherty, Caltech
- 2011 Karl O. Christe, USC
- 2012 John Bercaw, Caltech
- 2013 Mark E. Thompson, USC
- 2014 William J. Evans, UC Irvine
- 2015 Michael Jung, UCLA
- 2016 Paul S. Weiss, UCLA
- 2017 Jeffrey I. Zink, UCLA
- 2018 Clifford P. Kubiak, UC San Diego
- 2019 A. S. Borovik, UCI
- 2020 Pingyun Feng, UCR
- 2021 Donald R. Blake, UCI
- 2022 Alison Butler, UCSB
- 2023 Sarah H. Tolbert, UCLA

== See also ==
- List of chemistry awards
- List of prizes named after people
