= Glenn T. Seaborg Medal =

The Glenn T. Seaborg Medal is an annual award established in 1987 by the University of California, Los Angeles (UCLA) Department of Chemistry & Biochemistry. It is the highest honor the department bestows on an individual for distinguished contributions to science, technical innovation, and/or public service in science. The medal honors Nobel Prize-winning chemist Glenn T. Seaborg, a UCLA alumnus and its first recipient. Each year, the medalist is chosen by an executive committee of the UCLA Department of Chemistry & Biochemistry.

The medal has been awarded to prominent scientists including 11 Nobel laureates. Its recipients and award presentations have been covered by Chemical & Engineering News, including coverage of the medals awarded to David Eisenberg in 2004, Ronald Evans in 2005, Stan Williams in 2007, and Joan Valentine in 2008. The Daily Bruin also covered Richard Heck's receipt of the medal in 2011, describing it as an annual UCLA Department of Chemistry and Biochemistry award for achievements in chemistry.

== Medalists ==
Year	Awardee	Institution
1987	Glenn T. Seaborg (Nobel Laureate)	UC Berkeley
1988	Warren W. Kaeding	Mobil Chemical
1989	Donald J. Cram (Nobel Laureate)	UCLA
1990	George Gregory	Products Research and Chemical Corp.
1991	John D. Roberts	Caltech
1992	Ralph H. Bauer	Bauer Investments
1993	R. Bruce Merrifield (Nobel Laureate)	Rockefeller University
1994	George S. Hammond	Allied Signal Corporation
1995	George B. Rathmann	ICOS Corporation
1996	Mary L. Good	US Dept of Commerce
1997	M. Frederick Hawthorne	UCLA
1998	Paul D. Boyer (Nobel Laureate)	UCLA
1999	John P. McTague	Ford Research Laboratory
2000	Daniel E. Koshland, Jr.	UC Berkeley
2001	James B. Peter	Specialty Laboratories
2002	Richard E. Smalley (Nobel Laureate)	Rice University
2003	Alexander Pines and Ad Bax	UC Berkeley
2004	David Eisenberg	UCLA
2005	Ronald M. Evans	Salk Institute
2006	David A. Evans	Harvard University
2007	R. Stanley Williams	Hewlett-Packard Laboratories
2008	Joan S. Valentine	UCLA
2009	Mostafa A. El-Sayed	Georgia Institute of Technology
2010	Robert Tjian	UC Berkeley
2011	Richard F. Heck (Nobel Laureate)	University of Delaware
2012	Harold E. Varmus (Nobel Laureate)	National Cancer Institute
2013	Kendall N. Houk	UCLA
2014	Fred Wudl and Linda Wudl	University of California, Santa Barbara
2015	Stefan W. Hell (Nobel Laureate)	Max Planck Institute for Multidisciplinary Sciences
2016	Michael E. Jung	UCLA
2017	William Gelbart	UCLA
2018	Robert Glaeser and Richard Henderson (Nobel Laureate)	UC Berkeley and MRC Laboratory of Molecular Biology
2019	Paul Alivisatos	UC Berkeley
2020	No Medalist due to pandemic	
2021	No Medalist due to pandemic	
2022	Carolyn R. Bertozzi (Nobel Laureate)	Stanford University
2023-24	Juli Feigon	UCLA
2025	Fraser Stoddart (Nobel Laureate) Note: Stoddart was selected as the 2025 medalist but died before the scheduled event, and UCLA proceeded with the symposium and dinner as a memorial celebration; his daughter Fiona McCubbin accepted the medal on his behalf.	Northwestern University
2026	Richard Kaner	UCLA

== See also ==
- List of chemistry awards
- List of previous Seaborg Medalists, including links to photos from each year’s Seaborg Symposium.
