= R. Nelson Smith =

American chemist (1916–1983)

- Born: Robert Nelson Smith; September 25, 1916; Long Beach, California, US
- Died: December 23, 1983 (aged 67); Mount Baldy, California, US
- Education: Pomona College; Stanford University
- Awards: Guggenheim Fellowship; Phi Beta Kappa
- Scientific career
- Fields: Chemistry
- Workplaces: Missouri School of Mines; Manhattan Project; Pomona College
- Thesis: Studies on the photochemistry of ammonia and hydroxylamine. (1942)
- Doctoral advisor: Philip Albert Leighton
- Notable students: M. Frederick Hawthorne

Robert Nelson Smith (September 25, 1916 – December 23, 1983) was an American chemist who specialized in colloids. He taught at Pomona College in Claremont, California, from 1945 to 1982. He was chair of the college's chemistry department and was known for his practical jokes.

== Early life and education ==
Smith was born on September 25, 1916, in Long Beach, California, and he grew up in Long Beach and Fontana, California. He attended Pomona College, graduating in 1938, and was a member of the Phi Beta Kappa honors society. While as a student at Pomona, Smith authored two papers with his chemistry professor, Wesley G. Leighton. After leaving Pomona, Smith went to Stanford University to work under Leighton's brother Philip A. Leighton and was awarded an M.A. and Ph.D. in 1940 and 1942 respectively.

== Career ==
After receiving his PhD in 1942, Smith began teaching in the Chemistry Department at the Missouri School of Mines in Rolla. While teaching at Missouri, Smith became a mentor to a 15-year old high student and future National Medal of Science winner named M. Frederick Hawthorne who would eventually follow him to Pomona.

During World War II, Smith worked on the Manhattan Project at the Hanford Site in Richland, Washington. During the 1951–1952 academic year, he did a Guggenheim Fellowship in England on surface chemistry.

Smith joined the faculty at Pomona in 1945. His research focus was colloids. In 1956, he was promoted to the rank of full professor, and he later became the chair of the college's chemistry department. During the 1958–1959 academic year, he did another fellowship in England sponsored by the American Chemical Society's Petroleum Research Fund.

In 1958, he co-authored with colleague W. Conway Pierce the textbook General Chemistry Problems. He and Pierce published several later editions of the book under the title Solving General Chemistry Problems.

Smith was an early adopter of computer technology, which he used in his courses.

=== Pranks ===
Smith was well known for his humorous teaching style and for fostering an active prank culture in his department. His notable pranks included once releasing a flock of pigeons during a lecture by Pierce, playing bagpipe to accompany geologist Donald B. McIntyre's inaugural lecture, and replacing colleague Corwin Hansch's desk chair with a porcelain toilet.

== Recognition ==
In 1961, Smith was honored for his teaching by the Manufacturing Chemists' Association. He received the 1982 Wig Distinguished Professor award for excellence in teaching from Pomona College.

== Retirement and death ==
Smith retired in 1982. He died on December 23, 1983, in a mountaineering accident on Mount Baldy.
