= Anton Burg =

American chemist and high jumper

- Born: October 18, 1904; Dallas City, Illinois USA
- Died: November 18, 2003 (aged 99); Los Angeles, California USA
- Education: University of Chicago
- Known for: Organoboranes
- Awards: Tolman Award (1961)
- Scientific career
- Fields: Chemistry
- Workplaces: University of Southern California

Anton Behme Burg (October 18, 1904 – November 18, 2003) was an American chemist and high jumper. He was chairman of the University of Southern California chemistry department and an expert on boron.

Burg joined USC in 1939 as an assistant professor. He built up USC's chemistry department, making it one of the best chemistry departments in the United States by the 1950s. He recruited Sidney Benson, Jerry Donohue, and Arthur Adamson as faculty. Burg retired in 1974.

During his time with Morris S. Kharasch at the University of Chicago, he worked with Herbert C. Brown, who won a Nobel Prize for his work following up on Burg's research.

Burg was also an accomplished high jumper, and he was the 1927 NCAA outdoor high jump champion. He was also national champion at the 1931 USA Indoor Track and Field Championships.
