= Fred Wudl =

American material scientist

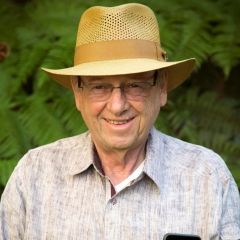
- Occupations: Material scientist, academic and researcher
- Awards: Fellow, American Association for the Advancement of Science; American Chemical Society Award for Chemistry of Materials; Fellow, Chemical Research Society of India; Giulio Natta Medal, Italian Chemical Society; Herbert Newby McCoy Award, University of California, Los Angeles; Tolman Medal of the SCALACS; Fellow, the Royal Society of Chemistry (RSC); Seaborg Medal, UCLA

Academic background
- Education: University of California, Los Angeles (UCLA); Harvard University

Fred Wudl is an American materials scientist, academic researcher. He is a professor emeritus in the Department of Materials Engineering at the University of California, Santa Barbara.

Wudl has published over 500 papers and has 20 patents awarded. He is known for his work on organic conductors and super-conductors with the discovery of the electronic conductivity of the precursor to the first organic metal and superconductor. He leads research aimed at optical and electrooptical properties of processable conjugated polymers, as well as on the organic chemistry of fullerenes and the design and preparation of self-mending and selfhealing materials.

Wudl is a Fellow of American Association for the Advancement of Science, Chemical Research Society of India (CRSI), and the Royal Society of Chemistry (RSC), and a Member of several professional societies and organizations, including American Academy of Arts and Sciences, Center for Energy Efficient Materials, and Mitsubishi Chemical Center for Advanced Materials.

== Early life and education ==
Wudl was born in Cochabamba, Bolivia on January 8, 1941. He studied at the University of California, Los Angeles (UCLA), where he received his Bachelor’s degree in 1964, and a Doctoral degree under the supervision of Professor Donald J. Cram in 1967. From 1967 till 1968, he was a postdoctoral fellow with R.B. Woodward at Harvard University.

== Career ==
Following his postdoctoral fellowship, Wudl joined State University of New York at Buffalo as an assistant professor in 1968. He then held appointment at AT&T Bell Laboratories as a member of technical staff in 1972, and was promoted to supervising member of technical staff in 1974. In 1982, he was appointed by the University of California, Santa Barbara, where he served as a professor of chemistry and physics till 1994, as a professor of chemistry and materials till 1997, and then as Dean M. Willard Professor of Chemistry at UCLA till 2006. Following this appointment, he again held appointment as a professor of chemistry and materials at UCSB, and subsequently became research professor of chemistry and materials in 2017. He remained in that position until becoming professor emeritus in 2020.

Together with Alan Heeger, he created the Institute for Polymers and Organic Solids (IPOS) at UCSB in 1982 and was its co-director until 1997. That year, he and Fraser Stoddart created the Exotic Materials Institute at UCLA (1997–2006). Back at UCSB, He was appointed as co-director for CPOS from 2006 till 2011. At that time he was also acting associate director for California NanoSystems Institute for a year.

== Research ==
Wudl, one of the pioneers of organic electronics, focuses his research on organic conductors and superconductors, with particular attention on electronically conducting polymers, the organic chemistry of fullerenes, the design and preparation of self-mending polymers. He has discovered the first transparent organic conductor and the first self-doped polymers. He is also known for his discovery of the electronic conductivity of the precursor to the first organic metal and superconductor. His current research focuses on two areas: plastic solar cells and high energy density batteries such as those based on Li and Ca.

Wudl also works extensively on the design and synthesis of organic molecules and polymers for applications in organic light emitting diodes (LEDs). In 2006, he demonstrated an organic light-emitting diode based on blue-fluorescent dopant 7,8,10-triphenylfluoranthene in a host of dipyrenylfluorene derivatives. He conducted a comparison of the photoluminescence and electroluminescence spectra, and indicated a nearly identical exciton relaxation and efficient energy transfer from the host to the dopant. In another research, he obtained efficient and very bright white polymer light-emitting diodes, and discussed the functions of terminal pyrene moieties in “twistacene.” As a result of the characterization of rectifying heterojunctions (diodes) fabricated from a semiconducting polymer, he highlighted the development of a soluble derivative of poly(phenylene‐vinylene), and buckminsterfullerene, C60. His research also revealed the fact that photoinduced electron transfer across the donor‐accepted rectifying heterojunction offers potential for photodetector and for solar cell applications.

Wudl recently took part in studies regarding main-group halide semiconductors, their discussed distinguishing features, such as defect-tolerant electronic structure, proximal lattice instabilities and labile defect migration were discussed. These studies further highlighted how these distinguishing features present a key role in terms of understanding the origins of the optoelectronic performance of the well-studied hybrid organic–inorganic lead halides. In these studies, the group also provided a detailed review on the preparation and characterization of some alternatives to the lead halide perovskites. In the paper published in 2017, the group studied and measured the charge transport properties of a two-dimensional hybrid metal halide thiocyanate compound using the contactless electronic characterization technique time-resolved microwave conductivity (TRMC).

== Awards/honors ==
- 1988 – Peter A. Leermakers Lecturer
- 1989 – Fellow, American Association for the Advancement of Science
- 1992 – Visiting Scientist at the C.N.R.S. "Postes Rouge", Orsay, France
- 1992 – Lecturer in Chemistry Award; Karcher Lecturer, University of Oklahoma
- 1992 – Leermakers Lecturer; 3M Lecturer, University of British Columbia
- 1993 – Arthur D. Little Award; Arthur C. Cope Scholar Award; Stouffer Award, University of Southern California
- 1994 – Wheland Medal, University of Chicago; The "Giulio Natta" Medal, Rome; Clapp Lecturer, Brown University
- 1996 – American Chemical Society Award for Chemistry of Materials; Bayer Lecturer, Cornell University
- 1997 – Alumnus of the Year Award from Los Angeles City College
- 2001 – Herbert Newby McCoy Award, UCLA
- 2001 – Member, American Academy of Arts and Sciences
- 2004 – D.Sc. (Honoris Causa), Universidad Complutense, Madrid, Spain
- 2005 – Professor C.N.R. Rao Lecture Award of Chemical Research Society of India (CRSI); Honorary Fellow, CRSI
- 2006 – Merck-Karl Pfister Visiting Professor in Organic Chemistry, MIT
- 2007 – Tolman Medal of the SCALACS
- 2008 – Professional Achievement Award, University of California, Los Angeles
- 2010 – Fellow, the Royal Society of Chemistry (RSC); Stephanie L. Kwolek Award, RSC
- 2012 – D.Sc. (Honoris Causa), University of Trieste, Trieste, Italy
- 2014 – Spiers Award and medal from the Royal Society of Chemistry (RSC)
- 2014 – Seaborg Medal, UCLA

== Bibliography ==
- Fabini, Douglas H.; Labram, John G.; Lehner, Anna J.; Bechtel, Jonathon S.; Evans, Hayden A.; Van der Ven, Anton; Wudl, Fred; Chabinyc, Michael L.; Seshadri, Ram (15 September 2016). "Main-Group Halide Semiconductors Derived from Perovskite: Distinguishing Chemical, Structural, and Electronic Aspects". Inorganic Chemistry. 56 (1). American Chemical Society (ACS): 11–25. doi:10.1021/acs.inorgchem.6b01539. ISSN 0020-1669. PMID 28043138.
- Evans, Hayden A.; Schueller, Emily C.; Smock, Sara R.; Wu, Guang; Seshadri, Ram; Wudl, Fred (2017). "Perovskite-related hybrid noble metal iodides: Formamidinium platinum iodide [(FA)2Pt I6] and mixed-valence methylammonium gold iodide [(MA)2Au Au I6]". Inorganica Chimica Acta. 468. Elsevier BV: 280–284. doi:10.1016/j.ica.2017.04.060. ISSN 0020-1693. OSTI 1599742. S2CID 99753216.
- Preefer, Molleigh B.; Oschmann, Bernd; Hawker, Craig J.; Seshadri, Ram; Wudl, Fred (19 October 2017). "High Sulfur Content Material with Stable Cycling in Lithium-Sulfur Batteries". Angewandte Chemie International Edition. 56 (47). Wiley: 15118–15122. doi:10.1002/anie.201708746. ISSN 1433-7851. PMID 28984016. S2CID 31244070.
- Evans, Hayden A.; Andrews, Jessica L.; Fabini, Douglas H.; Preefer, Molleigh B.; Wu, Guang; Cheetham, Anthony K.; Wudl, Fred; Seshadri, Ram (2019). "The capricious nature of iodine catenation in I2 excess, perovskite-derived hybrid Pt(iv) compounds". Chemical Communications. 55 (5). Royal Society of Chemistry (RSC): 588–591. doi:10.1039/c8cc07536k. ISSN 1359-7345. OSTI 1483443. PMID 30480673. S2CID 53732366.
- Chen, Xiaolong; Zhang, Dongwei; He, Yaowu; Ali, Muhammad Umair; Wu, Yuting; Zhao, Changbin; Wu, Peiheng; Yan, Chaoyi; Wudl, Fred; Meng, Hong (2020). "Fluoro-alkyl substituted isothianaphthene bisimides as stable n-type semiconductors". Materials Chemistry Frontiers. 4 (12). Royal Society of Chemistry (RSC): 3578–3584. doi:10.1039/d0qm00137f. ISSN 2052-1537. S2CID 219022615.
