= Chris Foote =

Chris Foote may refer to:

- Christopher Spencer Foote (1935–2005), American chemist
- Chris Foote (American football) (born 1956), American football player
- Chris Foote (footballer) (born 1950), English footballer
