= Omar Farha =

Chemistry professor

Omar K. Farha is the Charles E. and Emma H. Morrison Professor and department chair in Chemistry at Northwestern University, an Executive Editor for ACS Applied Materials & Interfaces, and Chief Scientific Officer of Numat.

His current research spans diverse areas of chemistry and materials science ranging from energy to defense-related challenges. Specifically, his research focuses on the rational design of smart crystalline programmable sponges, also called metal-organic frameworks (MOFs) for applications sensing, catalysis, storage, separations, and water purification. In 2012, Farha et al. synthesized two MOFs (NU-109 and NU-110) that broke the record for the highest specific surface area. His NU-1501 is the record holder in surface area when all 4 consistency criteria are met. His research accomplishments have been recognized by several awards and honors including a fellow of the National Academy of Inventors, fellow of the European Academy of Sciences, the Kuwait Prize, the ACS Award in Inorganic Nanoscience, the Japanese Society of Coordination Chemistry “International award for creative work”, the Royal Society of Chemistry “Environment, Sustainability and Energy Division Early Career” Award, the American Chemical Society “The Satinder Ahuja Award for Young Investigators in Separation Science” and “ACS ENFL Emerging Researcher Award”, and an award established by the Department of Chemistry at Northwestern University in his honor: the Omar Farha Award for Research Leadership “awarded for stewardship, cooperation and leadership in the finest pursuit of research in chemistry” and given annually to an outstanding research scientist working in the department. Prof. Farha has been named a “Highly Cited Researcher” from 2014 to 2023. Prof. Farha is one of the Top 100 Chemists (#35) in the world (Research.com). Prof. Farha is the co-founder and president of Numat, the first company to commercialized an engineered system-level product enabled by Metal-Organic Framework Materials.

== Education ==
Farha earned his A.A. at Fullerton College in 1999, his B.S. in chemistry at University of California, Los Angeles in 2002, and his Ph.D. in 2006 under the advisement of M. Frederick Hawthorne. He subsequently trained as a post-doc with Joseph T. Hupp at Northwestern.

== Publications ==
- K. B. Idrees, Z. Li, H. Xie, K. O. Kirlikovali, M. Kazem-Rostami, X. Wang, X. Wang, T-Y. Tai, T. Islamoglu, J. F. Stoddart, R. Q. Snurr and O. K. Farha, “Separation of Aromatic Hydrocarbons In Porous Materials,” J. Am. Chem. Soc., 2022, 144, 12212–12218. DOI:10.1021/jacs.2c03114.
- X. Gong, K. Gnanasekaran, K. Ma, C. J. Forman, S. Su, X. Wang, O. K. Farha and N. C. Gianneschi, “Rapid Generation of Metal-Organic Framework Phase Diagrams by High-Throughput Transmission Electron Microscopy,” J. Am. Chem. Soc., 2022, 144, 6674–6680. DOI:10.1021/jacs.2c01095.
- K. Ma, M. C. Wasson, X. Wang, X. Zhang, K. B. Idrees, Z. Chen, Y. Wu, S-J. Lee, R. Cao, Y. Chen, L. Yang, F. A. Son, T. Islamoglu, G. W. Peterson, J. J. Mahle, and O. K. Farha, “Near-instantaneous catalytic hydrolysis of organophosphorus nerve agents with zirconium-based MOF/hydrogel composites,” Chem Catalysis, 2021, 1, 721-733. DOI: 10.1016/j.checat.2021.06.008.
- Z. Chen, P. Li, R. Anderson, X. Wang, X. Zhang, L. Robison, L. Redfern, Shinya Moribe, T. Islamoglu, D. Gómez-Gualdrón, T. Yildirim, J. F. Stoddart and O. K. Farha, “Balancing Volumetric and Gravimetric Uptake in Highly Porous Materials for Clean Energy,” Science, 2020, 368, 297-303. DOI: 10.1126/science.aaz8881.
- Y. Chen, P. Li, J. Zhou, C. T. Buru, L. Dordevic, P. Li, X. Zhang, M. M. Cetin, J. F. Stoddart, S. I. Stupp, M. R. Wasielewski, O. K. Farha, "Integration of Enzymes and Photosensitizers in a Hierarchical Mesoporous Metal-Organic Framework for Light-Driven CO2 Reduction," J. Am. Chem. Soc. 2020, 142, 1768-1773. DOI: 10.1021/jacs.9b12828.
- Z. Chen, K. Ma, J. J. Mahle, H. Wang, Z. H. Syed, A. Atilgan, Y. Chen, J. H. Xin, T. Islamoglu, G. W. Peterson and O. K. Farha, “Integration of Metal-Organic Frameworks on Protective Layers for Destruction of Nerve Agents under Relevant Conditions,” J. Am. Chem. Soc., 2019, 141, 20016-20021. DOI:10.1021/jacs.9b11172.
- S. Wang, Y. Chen, S. Wang, P. Li, C. A. Mirkin, O. K. Farha, "DNA-Functionalized Metal-Organic Framework Nanoparticles for Intracellular Delivery of Proteins," J. Am. Chem. Soc. 2019, 141, 2215-2219. DOI: 10.1021/jacs.8b12705.
- Y. Chen, P. Li, J. A. Modica, R. J. Drout and O. K. Farha, “Acid-Resistant Mesoporous Metal-Organic Framework Toward Oral Insulin Delivery: Protein Encapsulation, Protection & Release,” J. Am. Chem. Soc., 2018, 140, 5678-5681. DOI:10.1021/jacs.8b02089.
- P. Li, Q. Chen, T. C. Wang, N. A. Vermeulen, B. L. Mehdi, A. Dohnalkova, N. D. Browning, D. Shen, R. Anderson, D. A. Gómez-Gualdrón, J. Jagiello, A. M. Asiri, J. F. Stoddart, O. K. Farha, “Hierarchically engineered mesoporous metal-organic frameworks toward cell-free immobilized enzyme systems,” Chem, 2018, 4, 1022–1034. DOI:10.1016/j.chempr.2018.03.001.
- P. Li, N. A. Vermeulen, C. D. Malliakas, D. A. Gómez-Gualdrón, A. J. Howarth, B. L. Mehdi, A. Dohnalkova, N. D. Browning, M. O'Keeffe, and O. K. Farha, “Bottom-Up Construction of a Superstructure in a Porous Uranium–Organic Crystal,” Science, 2017, 356, 624-627. DOI:10.1126/science.aam7851.
- P. Li, S-Y. Moon, M. A. Guelta, L. Lin, D. A. Gómez-Gualdrón, R. Q. Snurr, S. P. Harvey, J. T. Hupp, and O. K. Farha, “Nanosizing a Metal-Organic Framework Enzyme Carrier for Accelerating Nerve Agent Hydrolysis,” ACS Nano, 2016, 10, 9174–9182. DOI:10.1021/acsnano.6b04996.
- J. E. Mondloch, M. J. Katz, W. C. Isley III, P. Ghosh, P. Liao, W. Bury, G. W. Wagner, M. G. Hall, J. B. DeCoste, G. W. Peterson, R. Q. Snurr, C. J. Cramer, J. T. Hupp, and O. K. Farha, “Destruction Chemical Warfare Agents Utilizing Metal-Organic Frameworks,” Nat. Mater., 2015, 14, 512–516. DOI:10.1038/nmat4238.
