= Mark Thompson (chemist) =

American chemist

Mark E. Thompson is a Californian chemistry academic who has worked with OLEDs.

== Career ==
Mark E. Thompson graduated with honors from the University of California, Berkeley, earning his B.S. in chemistry in 1980. He earned a Ph.D. in inorganic chemistry working under the guidance of Prof. John E. Bercaw. He conducted research at a Smithsonian Environmental Research Center (S.E.R.C.) as a Research Fellow in an Inorganic Chemistry Laboratory at Oxford University. There, Thompson worked with Prof. Malcolm L. H. Green investigating specific properties of organometallic materials.

Following his S.E.R.C. Fellowship, Thompson became an assistant professor at Princeton University in 1987. He moved in 1995 to the University of Southern California, where he currently holds a Ray R. Irani Chair of Chemistry. From 2005 to 2008, Thompson served as the Chemistry Department Chairman at USC.

== Research ==
Thompson's multidisciplinary research focuses on solving problems related to energy inefficiency of existing light-generating sources. His research is primarily focused on organic light-emitting diodes, organic photovoltaics and device interfaces.

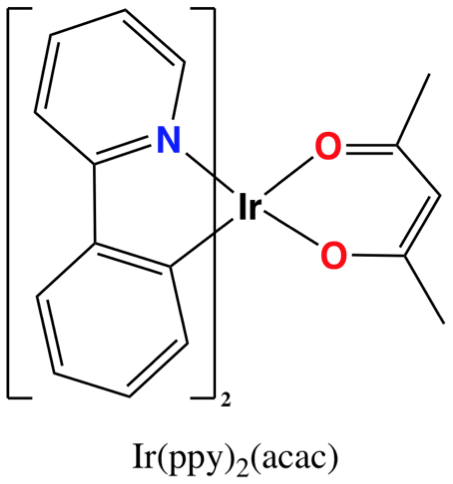

Thompson's research on OLEDs addresses problems such as the mechanism of electroluminescence, the identification of new materials and device architectures for OLEDs. His work in OLEDs is part of a long-term collaboration with Prof. Stephen Forrest (University of Michigan), dating back to 1994. The Thompson Group was the first to report efficient electro-phosphorescence in OLEDs, which shifts the efficiency limit of OLEDs from 25% to 100%. One area focus has been on organometallic complexes as phosphorescent emitters in OLEDs. His laboratory discovered and developed a class of Ir(III)-based complexes featuring polyaromatic ligands, which can be efficiently tuned for color emission and excited-state lifetimes. These materials can be doped in the emissive layer of multilayer, vapor-deposited OLEDs and generally show high stabilities and efficiencies. Emitters from this family of materials were developed by the Universal Display Corporation and can be found in a wide range of commercial electronic displays, including the Galaxy mobile phone form Samsung and OLED-based televisions form LG.

He has also done work on deep blue phosphorescent organic light-emitting diodes with very high brightness and efficiency, which are essential for display and lighting applications. His results represent an advance in blue-emitting phosphorescent OLED architectures and materials combinations.

Additionally, Thompson has shown a very high-efficiency OLED approaching 100% internal quantum efficiency. The high internal phosphorescence efficiency and charge balance in the structure are responsible for the high efficiency. He also developed a new white OLED architecture that uses a fluorescent emitting dopant to harness all high energy singlet excitons for blue emission, and phosphorescent dopants to harvest lower-energy triplet excitons for green and red emission. As of now, Thompson currently holds over 200 patents in OLED materials and devices.

Another focus of his is on organic photovoltaics (OPVs). Thompson's research highlights recent progress in explaining molecular characteristics which result in photovoltage losses in heterojunction organic photovoltaics. In addition to this research, Thompson grows thin films to control their structure. Then with these films, he can study the nature of energy and charge propagation. He has done work on thin films made of zinc tetraphenylporphyrin (ZnTPP) which are used to prepare Organic solar cells. He has worked with singlet fission materials that promise to give markedly improved efficiencies for OPVs by current multiplication. Singlet fission involves the splitting of a singlet exciton into two triplet excitons, so a single photon can lead to two hole/electron pairs in a photovoltaic cell. His work has led to tetracene based materials that give high triplet yield from amorphous thin films. Thompson has also explored the use of symmetry breaking charge transfer in OPV materials as a means to enhance the open circuit voltages of organic photovoltaics.

Another topic of research for Thompson has been on biotic/abiotic interfaces. The research focuses on smart materials that can respond to different environmental factors to produce technologies that produce desirable results. Such materials can be sensitive to magnetic fields, pH, light, stress, voltage, temperature, etc. For instance, an implantable, resonant mass sensor was created (built on a probe with a piezoelectric thin film) for liquid mass sensing. Thompson has demonstrated a selective functionalization of a range of In_{2}O_{3} nanowire devices by electrochemically activating their surfaces and then immobilizing bio-recognition agents such as single-strand DNA or antibodies. This has the potential to be used in large-scale biosensor arrays or chips for inexpensive multiplexed detection. Thompson has also worked with thermally responsive bioadhesives, designed to bind strongly to ocular tissues, such as retina or sclera, at physiological temperature and release completely at 10 °C. These adhesives can be used to anchor devices to retina or seal wounds in the sclera. Thompson's projects ultimately seek to design biomaterials to improve and revolutionize medical procedures.

== Awards and honors ==
- 2020 National Academy of Engineering Member
- 2017 Recipient of the Nishizawa Medal from the Institute of Electrical and Electronics Engineers (IEEE)
- 2016 Recipient of the Photonics Award from the Institute of Electrical and Electronics Engineers (IEEE)
- 2015 Recipient of the American Chemical Society Award in Chemistry of Materials
- 2014 Initiated as a National Academy of Inventors Fellow
- 2013 Recipient of the Tolman Award
- 2011 Ranked 12th of the top 100 chemists worldwide for their citation impact scores for chemistry papers published since January 2000, by Thomson Reuters Web of Science
- 2007 USC Associates Award for Excellence in Research
- 2006 MRS Medal, given by the Materials Research Society for the development of new materials for organic LEDs
- 2006 Jan Rajchman Prize for Outstanding Research in Flat Panel Displays, given by the Society for Information Display
- 2004 Raubenheimer Outstanding Faculty Award, College of Letters, Arts and Science, University of Southern California
- 1998 Thomas Alva Edison Patent Award, presented by the Research and Development Council of New Jersey, for multicolor organic light emitting devices
- 1998 Distinguished Inventor of the Year, awarded by The Intellectual Property Owners Association for the development of stacked multicolor organic LEDs
