= David Dolphin =

Canadian biochemist

- Born: January 15, 1940 (age 86); London, England
- Education: University of Nottingham; Harvard University
- Awards: Order of Canada
- Scientific career
- Fields: Biochemistry

David H. Dolphin, OC FRS FRSC (born January 15, 1940) is a Canadian biochemist.

He is an internationally recognized expert in porphyrin chemistry and biochemistry. He was the lead creator of Visudyne, a medication used in conjunction with laser treatment to eliminate the abnormal blood vessels in the eye associated with conditions such as the wet form of macular degeneration.

Born in London, England, he received a Bachelor of Science degree in 1962 and a Ph.D. in 1965 from the University of Nottingham. He then attended Harvard University as a postdoctoral fellow in the lab of Harvard organic chemist Robert B. Woodward. In 1966, he was appointed an assistant professor at Harvard. In 1974, he joined the faculty of science at the University of British Columbia where he became the Killam Research Professor. From 1988 to 1989, he was the acting Dean of Science. From 1999 to 2000, he was the acting Vice President of Research.

He is Chief Executive Officer of the BC Innovation Council and Vice-President, Technology Development at Quadra Logic Technologies Incorporated (QLT Inc.).

He is a Fellow of the Royal Society of Canada, the Royal Society, Canadian Institute of Chemistry, and the Royal Society of Chemistry. In 2006, he was made an Officer of the Order of Canada. In 2005, he was awarded the Gerhard Herzberg Canada Gold Medal for Science and Engineering, "with a guarantee of $1 million in research funding over the next five years from the Natural Sciences and Engineering Research Council (NSERC)". In 2012, he was awarded the Queen Elizabeth II Diamond Jubilee Medal.
