= R. Stanley Williams =

American solid state physicist and inventor

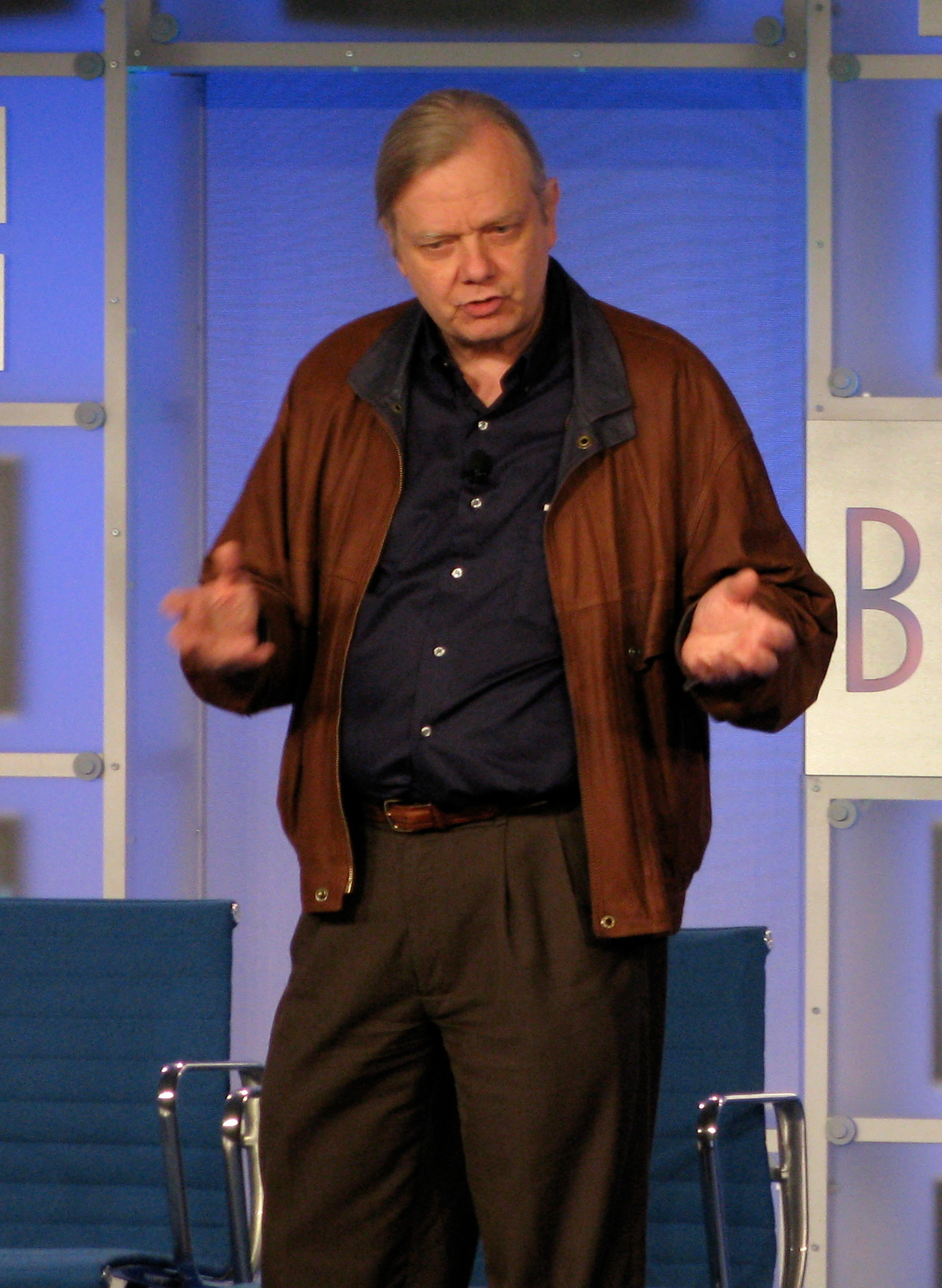
- Stan Williams speaking at Brainstorm 2008
- Born: Richard Stanley Williams; October 27, 1951 (age 74); Kodiak, Territory of Alaska, U.S.
- Education: Rice University; University of California, Berkeley
- Scientific career
- Fields: nanotechnology
- Workplaces: University of California, Los Angeles

Richard Stanley Williams (born 1951) is an American research scientist in the field of nanotechnology and a Senior Fellow and the founding director of the Quantum Science Research Laboratory at Hewlett-Packard. He has over 57 patents, with 40 more patents pending. At HP, he led a group that developed a working solid state version of Leon Chua's memristor.

Williams earned a bachelor's degree in chemical physics in 1974 from Rice University and a Ph.D. in physical chemistry from the University of California, Berkeley in 1978. After graduating, he worked at Bell Labs before joining the faculty at UCLA, where he served as a professor from 1980 to 1995. He then joined HP Labs as director of its Information and Quantum Systems Lab.

== Awards and honors ==
- Foresight Institute Feynman Prize in Nanotechnology (2000)
- Herman Bloch Medal for Industrial Research (2004)
- Julius Springer Prize for Applied Physics (2000)
- Glenn T. Seaborg Medal, UCLA (2007)
