= Juli Feigon =

American biophysicist

Juli Feigon is a Distinguished Professor of Biochemistry at the University of California, Los Angeles, where she has been a faculty member since 1985. She was elected to the United States National Academy of Sciences in 2009. Her research focuses on structural studies of nucleic acids by nuclear magnetic resonance spectroscopy and cryogenic electron microscopy (Cryo-EM) along with other biophysical techniques.

== Education ==
After completing undergraduate studies at Occidental College, Feigon received her Ph.D. from the University of California, San Diego in 1982. She then worked as a postdoctoral fellow with Alexander Rich at the Massachusetts Institute of Technology from 1982-85.

== Academic career ==
Feigon joined the faculty in the Department of Chemistry and Biochemistry at UCLA in 1985 as the first female assistant professor in the department. She was a recipient of the National Science Foundation's Presidential Young Investigator Award, awarded in 1989. She became a fellow of the American Association for the Advancement of Science in 2002 and a member of the United States National Academy of Sciences in 2009. She has won the 2019 BPS Founders Award. In 2024, Feigon was awarded the Glenn T. Seaborg Medal.

== Research ==
Feigon's research specializes in nuclear magnetic resonance spectroscopy (NMR) studies of the structure and dynamics of nucleic acids. Her research group has invested significant effort in determining the structure of telomerase, using NMR, X-ray crystallography, and more recently cryo-electron microscopy.

== Helping Hands Award ==
In 2024, Juli Feigon established the UCLA Department of Chemistry & Biochemistry Juli Feigon Helping Hands Award. The Juli Feigon Helping Hands Award is an annual award for postdoctoral fellows, research staff, and graduate students who are primary caregivers for dependent children or other family members, to provide extra time and resources to pursue their scientific careers.
