= Eudoxia Woodward =

American painter and chemistry researcher

Eudoxia Muller Woodward
- Born: Eudoxia M. Muller; June 14, 1919; Flushing, New York
- Died: January 20, 2008 (aged 88); Belmont, Massachusetts
- Known for: Painting
- Spouse: Robert Burns Woodward (m. 1946)

Eudoxia Muller Woodward (June 14, 1919 – January 20, 2008) was an American artist and chemistry researcher. She was known for her work with Edwin H. Land at the Polaroid Corporation, where her research helped produce the Vectograph and the earliest forms of Polaroid instant photography.

== Education and personal life ==
Born Eudoxia M. Muller in Flushing, New York, to Olga Popoff Muller, a sculptor, and John Muller an architect, she grew up in New York City. She attended St. Agatha’s School for high school and went on to receive her bachelor's degree from Smith College. She then settled in Boston, Massachusetts.

While at Polaroid, she met Robert Burns Woodward, who had been hired as a consultant. They married in September 1946 and had two children.

== Work at Polaroid ==
As a researcher at Polaroid, Woodward worked on Vectographs and research dedicated to instant photography. In 1944, Woodward worked on a special project (SX-70) led by Edwin Land that was dedicated to instant photography and the creation of an instant film camera. Woodward was the first person to ever see a Polaroid instant picture developed as part of her work with the SX-70 project.

== Post-Polaroid career ==
After leaving Polaroid, she taught art at the Belmont Day School in Belmont, Massachusetts, and at retirement communities.

The title of Woodward's 1977 art show in Boston, "Flowers - Art or Science?", exemplified the contradictions in her work. Her watercolor Pentagonal Red Hibiscus, displayed at a show in 1995 at the Francesca Anderson Fine Art gallery in Lexington, exemplified the unity she found in the two approaches to experience. For the Pentagonal Red Hibiscus she said she had plotted four views of the blossom against a pentagon. Her works have been shown in exhibitions at, among other sites, the DeCordova Museum and her alma mater, Smith College.

Variously, Woodward served on the boards of the Boston Museum of Science, the Boston Museum of Fine Arts, and the Cambridge Art Association. In 2002, the New England Watercolor Society awarded Woodward the "Stanhope Framers Prize".

In 2008, she died of cancer at her home in Belmont, Massachusetts.
