= Villy Sundström =

Swedish physical chemist

- Born: February 6, 1949 (age 77)
- Education: Umeå University
- Scientific career
- Institutions: Umeå University; Bell Labs; Lund University
- Thesis: Fast Photophysical and Photochemical Reactions of Some Organic Molecules: Description of a Picosecond Spectrometer
- Academic advisors: Peter Rentzepis
- Doctoral students: Eva Åkesson
- Website: www.nano.lu.se/villy-sundstrom

Villy Sundström (born February 6, 1949) is a Swedish physical chemist known for his work in ultrafast science and molecular photochemistry using time-resolved laser and X-ray spectroscopy techniques.

== Education and career ==
Sundström studied chemistry at Umeå University, obtaining his PhD in 1977. During his study, he visited Bell Labs and worked under Peter Rentzepis. Upon his return to Sweden, he started building the first ultrafast spectroscopy laboratory in Scandinavia at Umeå University and later at Lund University in Sweden. In 1994, Sundström was appointed professor of Chemical Dynamics and head of the Chemical Physics Department at Lund University. His group's research centers on the photophysics and photochemical processes in model systems of natural and artificial photosynthetic light harvesting, such as bacteriochlorophyll, carotenoids, transition metal complexes, organic and perovskite solar cells.

Sundström was an editor of the journal Chemical Physics Letters.

== Bibliography ==
=== Selected articles ===
1. Sundström, Villy; Gillbro, Tomas; Bergström, Hans (1982). "Picosecond kinetics of radiationless relaxations of triphenyl methane dyes. Evidence for a rapid excited-state equilibrium between states of differing geometry". Chemical Physics. 73 (3): 439–458. doi:10.1016/0301-0104(82)85183-5.
2. Åkesson, Eva; Sundström, Villy; Gillbro, Tomas (1985). "Solvent-dependent barrier heights of excited-state photoisomerization reactions". Chemical Physics Letters. 121 (6): 513–522. Bibcode:1985CPL...121..513A. doi:10.1016/0009-2614(85)87132-3.
3. Sundström, V.; van Grondelle, R.; Bergström, H.; Åkesson, E.; Gillbro, T. (1986-10-08). "Excitation-energy transport in the bacteriochlorophyll antenna systems of Rhodospirillum rubrum and Rhodobacter sphaeroides, studied by low-intensity picosecond absorption spectroscopy". Biochimica et Biophysica Acta (BBA) - Bioenergetics. 851 (3): 431–446. doi:10.1016/0005-2728(86)90080-0. ISSN 0005-2728.
4. Zhang, Fu Geng; van Grondelle, Rienk; Sundström, Villy (1992). "Pathways of energy flow through the light-harvesting antenna of the photosynthetic purple bacterium rhodobacter sphaeroides". Biophysical Journal. 61 (4): 911–920. doi:10.1016/S0006-3495(92)81898-2. PMC 1260350. PMID 19431825.
5. Pullerits, Tõnu; Sundström, Villy (1996-08-13). "Photosynthetic Light-Harvesting Pigment−Protein Complexes: Toward Understanding How and Why". Accounts of Chemical Research. 29 (8): 381–389. doi:10.1021/ar950110o. ISSN 0001-4842.
6. Polívka, Tomáš; Herek, Jennifer L.; Zigmantas, Donatas; Åkerlund, Hans-Erik; Sundström, Villy (1999-04-27). "Direct observation of the (forbidden) S_{1} state in carotenoids". Proceedings of the National Academy of Sciences. 96 (9): 4914–4917. doi:10.1073/pnas.96.9.4914. ISSN 0027-8424. PMC 21791. PMID 10220393.
7. Benkö, Gábor; Kallioinen, Jani; Korppi-Tommola, Jouko E. I.; Yartsev, Arkady P.; Sundström, Villy (2002-01-01). "Photoinduced Ultrafast Dye-to-Semiconductor Electron Injection from Nonthermalized and Thermalized Donor States". Journal of the American Chemical Society. 124 (3): 489–493. doi:10.1021/ja016561n. ISSN 0002-7863. PMID 11792221.
8. Pan, Jie; Benkö, Gábor; Xu, Yunhua; Pascher, Torbjörn; Sun, Licheng; Sundström, Villy; Polívka, Tomáš (2002-11-01). "Photoinduced Electron Transfer between a Carotenoid and TiO 2 Nanoparticle". Journal of the American Chemical Society. 124 (46): 13949–13957. doi:10.1021/ja0279186. ISSN 0002-7863. PMID 12431127.
9. Zigmantas, Donatas; Hiller, Roger G.; Sundström, Villy; Polívka, Tomáš (2002-12-24). "Carotenoid to chlorophyll energy transfer in the peridinin–chlorophyll- a –protein complex involves an intramolecular charge transfer state". Proceedings of the National Academy of Sciences. 99 (26): 16760–16765. doi:10.1073/pnas.262537599. ISSN 0027-8424. PMC 139217. PMID 12486228.
10. Pullerits, Tõnu; Zigmantas, Donatas; Sundström, Villy (2013-01-22). "Beatings in electronic 2D spectroscopy suggest another role of vibrations in photosynthetic light harvesting". Proceedings of the National Academy of Sciences. 110 (4): 1148–1149. doi:10.1073/pnas.1221058110. ISSN 0027-8424. PMC 3557030. PMID 23319614.
11. Vithanage, D. Amarasinghe; Devižis, A.; Abramavičius, V.; Infahsaeng, Y.; Abramavičius, D.; MacKenzie, R. C. I.; Keivanidis, P. E.; Yartsev, A.; Hertel, D.; Nelson, J.; Sundström, V. (2013-08-15). "Visualizing charge separation in bulk heterojunction organic solar cells". Nature Communications. 4 (1): 2334. Bibcode:2013NatCo...4.2334V. doi:10.1038/ncomms3334. ISSN 2041-1723. PMID 23945881.
12. Harlang, Tobias C. B.; Liu, Yizhu; Gordivska, Olga; Fredin, Lisa A.; Ponseca, Carlito S.; Huang, Ping; Chábera, Pavel; Kjaer, Kasper S.; Mateos, Helena; Uhlig, Jens; Lomoth, Reiner (2015). "Iron sensitizer converts light to electrons with 92% yield". Nature Chemistry. 7 (11): 883–889. Bibcode:2015NatCh...7..883H. doi:10.1038/nchem.2365. ISSN 1755-4349. PMID 26492008.
13. Chábera, Pavel; Liu, Yizhu; Prakash, Om; Thyrhaug, Erling; Nahhas, Amal El; Honarfar, Alireza; Essén, Sofia; Fredin, Lisa A.; Harlang, Tobias C. B.; Kjær, Kasper S.; Handrup, Karsten (2017-03-30). "A low-spin Fe(iii) complex with 100-ps ligand-to-metal charge transfer photoluminescence". Nature. 543 (7647): 695–699. Bibcode:2017Natur.543..695C. doi:10.1038/nature21430. ISSN 1476-4687. PMID 28358064. S2CID 205254302.
14. Kjær, Kasper Skov; Kaul, Nidhi; Prakash, Om; Chábera, Pavel; Rosemann, Nils W.; Honarfar, Alireza; Gordivska, Olga; Fredin, Lisa A.; Bergquist, Karl-Erik; Häggström, Lennart; Ericsson, Tore (2019-01-18). "Luminescence and reactivity of a charge-transfer excited iron complex with nanosecond lifetime". Science. 363 (6424): 249–253. Bibcode:2019Sci...363..249K. doi:10.1126/science.aau7160. ISSN 0036-8075. PMID 30498167. S2CID 54167123.

=== Reviews ===
1. Sundström, Villy; Grondelle, Rienk van (1990-08-01). "Energy transfer in photosynthetic light-harvesting antennas". JOSA B. 7 (8): 1595–1603. Bibcode:1990JOSAB...7.1595S. doi:10.1364/JOSAB.7.001595. ISSN 1520-8540.
2. van Grondelle, Rienk; Dekker, Jan P.; Gillbro, Tomas; Sundström, Villy (1994-08-16). "Energy transfer and trapping in photosynthesis". Biochimica et Biophysica Acta (BBA) - Bioenergetics. 1187 (1): 1–65. doi:10.1016/0005-2728(94)90166-X. ISSN 0005-2728.
3. Sundström, Villy; Pullerits, Tõnu; van Grondelle, Rienk (1999-04-01). "Photosynthetic Light-Harvesting: Reconciling Dynamics and Structure of Purple Bacterial LH2 Reveals Function of Photosynthetic Unit". The Journal of Physical Chemistry B. 103 (13): 2327–2346. doi:10.1021/jp983722+. ISSN 1520-6106.
4. Sundström, Villy (2000). "Light in elementary biological reactions". Progress in Quantum Electronics. 24 (5): 187–238. Bibcode:2000PQE....24..187S. doi:10.1016/S0079-6727(00)00005-7.
5. Polívka, Tomáš; Sundström, Villy (2004-04-01). "Ultrafast Dynamics of Carotenoid Excited States−From Solution to Natural and Artificial Systems". Chemical Reviews. 104 (4): 2021–2072. doi:10.1021/cr020674n. ISSN 0009-2665. PMID 15080720.
6. Sundström, Villy (2008-05-01). "Femtobiology". Annual Review of Physical Chemistry. 59 (1): 53–77. doi:10.1146/annurev.physchem.59.032607.093615. ISSN 0066-426X. PMID 17892434.
7. Polívka, Tomáš; Sundström, Villy (2009). "Dark excited states of carotenoids: Consensus and controversy". Chemical Physics Letters. 477 (1–3): 1–11. doi:10.1016/j.cplett.2009.06.011.
8. Sundstrom, Villy (2011). "Solar Energy Conversion – Natural to Artificial". In Bartolo, Baldassare Di; Collins, John (eds.). Biophotonics: Spectroscopy, Imaging, Sensing, and Manipulation. NATO Science for Peace and Security Series B: Physics and Biophysics. Dordrecht: Springer Netherlands. pp. 219–236. Bibcode:2011bsis.book..219S. doi:10.1007/978-90-481-9977-8_10. ISBN 978-90-481-9977-8.
9. Smolentsev, G.; Sundström, V. (2015-12-01). "Time-resolved X-ray absorption spectroscopy for the study of molecular systems relevant for artificial photosynthesis". Coordination Chemistry Reviews. COST: European Cooperation in Science and Technology Current Challenges in Supramolecular Artificial Photosynthesis. 304–305: 117–132. doi:10.1016/j.ccr.2015.03.001. ISSN 0010-8545.
10. Ponseca, Carlito S.; Chábera, Pavel; Uhlig, Jens; Persson, Petter; Sundström, Villy (2017-08-23). "Ultrafast Electron Dynamics in Solar Energy Conversion". Chemical Reviews. 117 (16): 10940–11024. doi:10.1021/acs.chemrev.6b00807. ISSN 0009-2665. PMID 28805062.
11. Lindh, Linnea; Chábera, Pavel; Rosemann, Nils W.; Uhlig, Jens; Wärnmark, Kenneth; Yartsev, Arkady; Sundström, Villy; Persson, Petter (2020-03-10). "Photophysics and Photochemistry of Iron Carbene Complexes for Solar Energy Conversion and Photocatalysis". Catalysts. 10 (3): 315. doi:10.3390/catal10030315. ISSN 2073-4344.
12. Chábera, Pavel; Lindh, Linnea; Rosemann, Nils W.; Prakash, Om; Uhlig, Jens; Yartsev, Arkady; Wärnmark, Kenneth; Sundström, Villy; Persson, Petter (2021-01-01). "Photofunctionality of iron(III) N-heterocyclic carbenes and related d5 transition metal complexes". Coordination Chemistry Reviews. 426 213517. doi:10.1016/j.ccr.2020.213517. ISSN 0010-8545. S2CID 224952928.

=== Books ===
1. Sundström, Villy, ed. (1997). Femtochemistry and femtobiology: ultrafast reaction dynamics at atomic-scale resolution : Nobel Symposium 101. London; River Edge, NJ: Imperial College Press; Distributed by World Scientific Pub. Co. ISBN 978-1-86094-039-2. OCLC 39550508.
2. Sundström, V.; Herek, J. (2004). Femtosecond photobiology. Bristol: Institute of Physics. ISBN 0-7503-0834-6. OCLC 56464277.
