= William Gelbart =

American professor and chemist (born 1946)

William Michael Gelbart
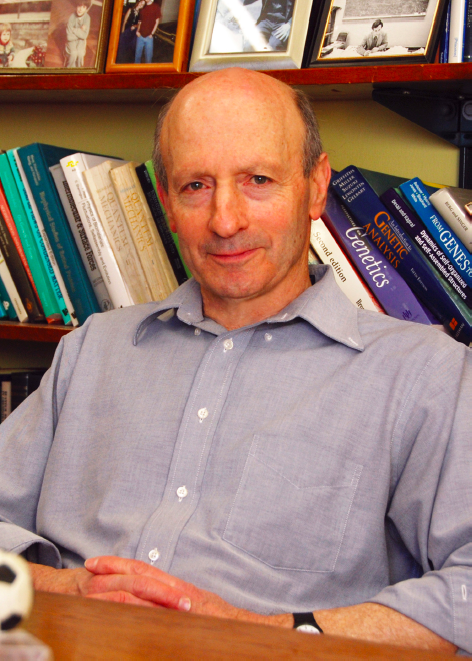
- Born: June 12, 1946 (age 80); Syracuse, New York
- Education: Harvard University (1967), University of Chicago (1968, 1970)
- Awards: Lennard-Jones Prize of the Royal Society of Chemistry, Guggenheim Fellowship for Natural Sciences, Liquids Prize of the American Chemical Society, American Academy of Arts and Sciences Member, Glenn T. Seaborg Medal
- Scientific career
- Fields: Physical Chemistry, Biophysics
- Doctoral advisor: Stuart A. Rice
- Website: sites.google.com/chem.ucla.edu/virus-group-at-ucla/home

William Michael Gelbart (born June 12, 1946) is an American chemist. He is a Distinguished Professor of Chemistry and Biochemistry at the University of California, Los Angeles, and a member of the California NanoSystems Institute and the UCLA Molecular Biology Institute. He obtained his Bachelor of Science degree from Harvard University in 1967, his Master's (1968) and PhD (1970) degrees from the University of Chicago, and did postdoctoral work at the University of Paris (1971) and the University of California, Berkeley (1972). After 30 years of research in theoretical physical chemistry, contributing notably to the fields of gas-phase photophysics, optical properties of simple liquids, and the statistical physics of complex fluids, he started a biophysics laboratory with Charles Knobler in 2002 to investigate the physical aspects of viral infectivity.

== Education and career ==
Gelbart's early interest in science was inspired by his time as an undergraduate researcher in the molecular spectroscopy group of William Klemperer at Harvard. As a graduate student at the University of Chicago, with his mentors Stuart A. Rice, Karl Freed, and Joshua Jortner, he developed the modern theory of non-radiative processes ("radiationless transitions") in molecular photophysics. He was a US National Science Foundation/NATO Postdoctoral Fellow at the, University of Paris in 1971, and a Miller Institute Postdoctoral Fellow at UC Berkeley in 1972, during which time he switched fields and formulated a general theory of collision-induced optical properties of simple fluids.

He was appointed Assistant Professor of Chemistry, at UC Berkeley in 1972, continuing his researches on the quantum mechanical theory of molecular spectroscopy and on the statistical mechanical theory of intermolecular and multiple light scattering in liquids away from and near their critical points. He moved to UCLA as Associate Professor of Chemistry in 1975, and was promoted to full Professor in 1979 and to Distinguished Professor in 1999. He was Chair of the Department of Chemistry and Biochemistry at UCLA from 2000-2004 and has been a member of UCLA's California NanoSystems Institute since 2004 and of its Molecular Biology Institute from 2008.

At UCLA, he became a leader in the then-emerging fields of "complex fluids" and " soft matter physics". Shortly after moving there he began a 40-year collaboration with Avinoam Ben-Shaul on statistical-thermodynamic models of liquid crystal systems, polymer and polyelectrolyte (in particular, DNA) solutions, and colloidal suspensions, and on the self-assembly theory of micelles, surfactant monolayers, and biological membranes.

During a sabbatical year in 1998-99 at the Institute for Theoretical Physics in UC Santa Barbara and at the Curie Institute in Paris, Gelbart became deeply intrigued by viruses and over the course of the next several years, with his UCLA colleague Charles Knobler, established a laboratory to investigate simple viruses outside their hosts and isolated in test tubes. Early results included: the first measurement of pressure inside DNA viruses, establishing that it is as high as tens of atmospheres depending on genome length and ambient salt concentrations; and the demonstration that capsid proteins from certain viruses are capable of complete in vitro packaging of a broad range of lengths of heterologous RNA. This work, along with that of several other groups in the United States and Europe, helped launch the field of "physical virology". Most recently he moved his viruses from test tubes to host cells, and from wildtype viruses to artificial viruses and virus-like particles, engineered for purposes of delivering self-replicating RNA genes, RNA vaccines, and therapeutic microRNA to targeted mammalian cells.

== Awards ==
In 1987, Gelbart was elected a Fellow of the American Physical Society "for his many contributions to the light scattering and phase transition properties of simple fluids, liquid crystals, and surfactant solutions". He received the 1991 Lennard-Jones Prize of the British Royal Society of Chemistry, a 1998 Guggenheim Fellowship, the 2001 Liquids Prize of the American Chemical Society, election to the American Academy of Arts and Sciences in 2009, and endowed lectureships over the past 25 years at the Curie Institute (Paris), the University of Leeds (England), Case Western Reserve University, Cornell University, Carnegie Mellon University, the University of Pittsburgh, and the University of Texas at Austin. At UCLA he won the 1996 University Distinguished Teaching Award, served as Chair of the Department of Chemistry and Biochemistry (2000-2004), and was awarded the Glenn T. Seaborg Medal in 2017. In 2016, his 70th birthday was honored by an international symposium on "Self Assembly, from Atoms to Life" at the Meso-American Center for Theoretical Physics, and by a "festschrift" issue of the Journal of Physical Chemistry B.
