= Alison Butler =

Researcher into bioinorganic chemistry and metallobiochemistry

- Education: Reed College (B.A.); University of California, San Diego (Ph.D.)
- Scientific career
- Workplaces: University of California, Los Angeles; California Institute of Technology; University of California, Santa Barbara
- Doctoral advisors: Robert G. Linck; Teddy G. Traylor
- Other academic advisors: Joan S. Valentine; Harry B. Gray

Alison Butler is a Distinguished Professor in the Department of Chemistry and Biochemistry at the University of California, Santa Barbara. She works on bioinorganic chemistry and metallobiochemistry. She is a Fellow of the American Association for the Advancement of Science (1997), the American Chemical Society (2012), the American Academy of Arts and Sciences (2019), and the Royal Society of Chemistry (2019). She was elected a member of the National Academy of Sciences in 2022.

== Education ==
Butler studied at Reed College, graduating in 1977. She started in immunology, but moved into chemistry to work with transition metals. She worked with Professor Tom Dunne on An intramolecular electron transfer study: the reduction of pyrazinepentaaminecobalt (III) by chromium (II). She earned her PhD at University of California, San Diego in 1982 under Robert G. Linck and Teddy G. Traylor.

== Career ==
Butler worked as a postdoctoral fellow at University of California, Los Angeles with Joan S. Valentine and at California Institute of Technology with Harry B. Gray. She was appointed to the faculty at University of California, Santa Barbara in 1986. Here she was awarded an American Cancer Society Junior Faculty Research Award. She was awarded the 34th University of California, Santa Barbara Harold J Plous Award.

She looks to discover new siderophores, small molecules that bind iron in microorganisms. She uses genomics and bioinformatics to predict new siderophore structures. She explores how siderophores adhere to mica and look at how they can promote surface colonisation. She identified that siderophores become sticky when wet, which may help to develop underwater adhesives. Her current research considers the uptake of microbial iron, vanadium haloperoxidases in microbial quorum sensing and cryptic halogenation, bio-inspired wet adhesion using catechol compounds, and the oxidative disassembly of lignin. Her research into the bioinorganic chemistry of iron is funded by the National Institutes of Health and National Science Foundation. She studies how transition metal ions are used by marine organisms.

In 2012, she became the president of the Society for Biological Inorganic Chemistry, and served until 2014. She was made a Fellow of the American Chemical Society in July 2012. She delivered the 2016 Douglas Eveleigh Endowed Lecture at the Waksman Institute of Microbiology. In 2018, she was awarded the American Chemical Society Alfred Bader Award for her work on siderophores. In 2019, she was elected to the American Academy of Arts and Sciences, received the American Chemical Society's Arthur C. Cope Scholar award for excellence in organic chemistry, and received the Royal Society of Chemistry's Inorganic Mechanisms Award. Butler also received the 2019-2020 Faculty Research Lecturer Award, the highest honor that University of California, Santa Barbara faculty can bestow on their members.
