= Cynthia Selassie =

American chemist

Cynthia Rachel D. Selassie is an American bio-organic and medicinal chemist known for her work with quantitative structure-activity relationships (QSAR). She is the Blanche and Frank R. Seaver Professor of Science and professor of chemistry at Pomona College in Claremont, California.

== Early life and education ==
Selassie was a student of Corwin Hansch, who pioneered the concept of QSAR. She studied at Mount St. Mary's College, Duke University, and the University of Southern California, where she received her doctorate.

== Career ==
Selassie began teaching at Pomona College in 1990. She currently holds the Blanche and Frank R. Seaver Professor of Science and Professor of Chemistry endowed chair.
