= Paul D. Boyer =

American biochemist (1918–2018)

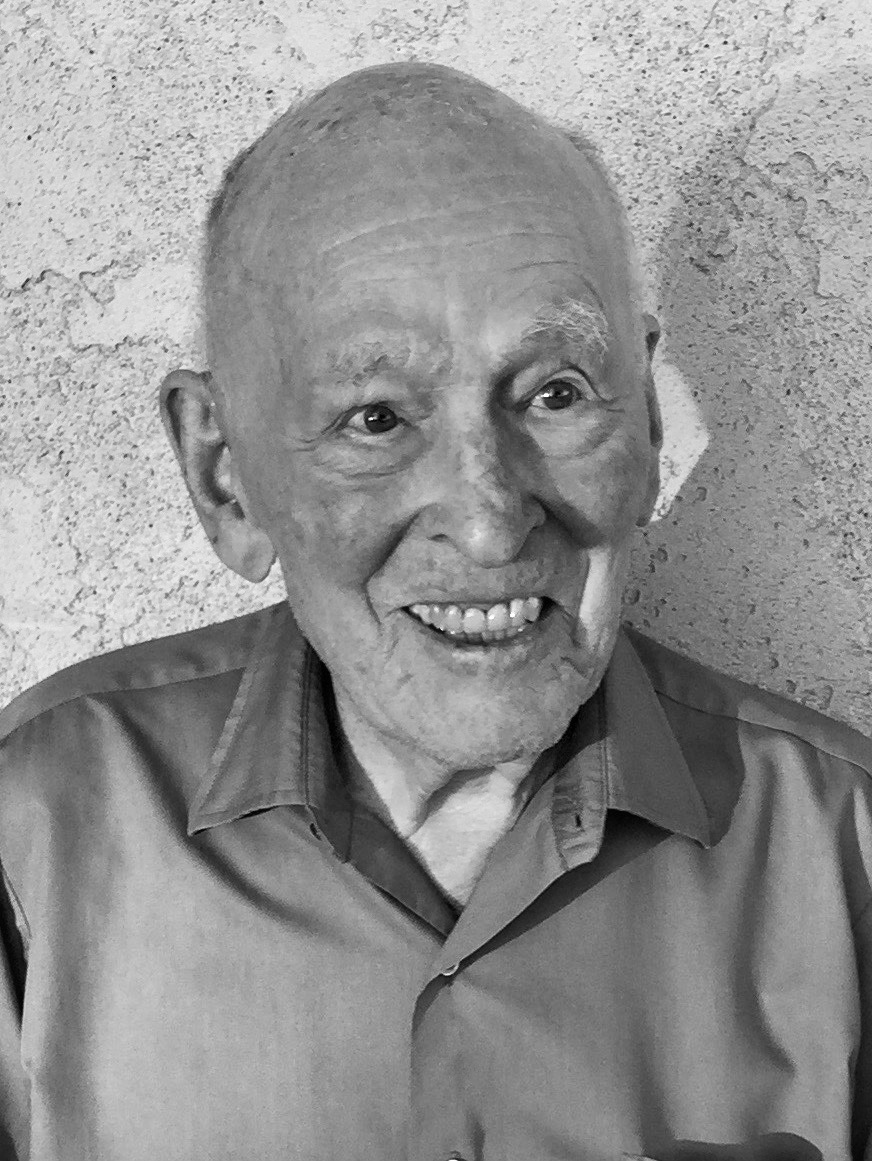
- Boyer in 2016
- Born: July 31, 1918; Provo, Utah, U.S.
- Died: June 2, 2018 (aged 99); Los Angeles, California, U.S.
- Education: Brigham Young University; University of Wisconsin–Madison
- Known for: Researching adenosine triphosphate; Editor of The Enzymes (1971–90)
- Spouse: Lyda Whicker
- Awards: Pfizer Award in Enzyme Chemistry (1955); Guggenheim Fellow (1955); Tolman Award (1981); Nobel Prize (1997); Seaborg Medal (1998)
- Scientific career
- Fields: Chemistry; Biochemistry; Molecular biology
- Workplaces: Stanford University (1943–45); University of Minnesota (St. Paul, 1945–46); University of Minnesota (Minneapolis, 1956–63); UCLA (1963–90); UCLA Molecular Biology Institute (1965–83); UC Program for Research and Training in Biotechnology (1985–89)

Paul Delos Boyer (July 31, 1918 – June 2, 2018) was an American biochemist, analytical chemist, and a professor of chemistry at University of California, Los Angeles (UCLA). He shared the 1997 Nobel Prize in Chemistry for research on the "enzymatic mechanism underlying the biosynthesis of adenosine triphosphate (ATP)" (ATP synthase) with John E. Walker, making Boyer the first Utah-born Nobel laureate; the remainder of the Prize in that year was awarded to Danish chemist Jens Christian Skou for his discovery of the Na+/K+-ATPase.

== Birth and education ==
Boyer was born in Provo, Utah, and grew up in a nonpracticing Mormon family of Dutch, German, French, and English descent. He attended Provo High School, where he was active in student government and the debating team. He was also his high schools valedictorian and played intramural basketball in high school and college. He received a B.S. in chemistry from Brigham Young University in 1939 and obtained a Wisconsin Alumni Research Foundation Scholarship for graduate studies. Five days before leaving for Wisconsin, Paul married Lyda Whicker in 1939, and they remained married for nearly eighty years until his death in 2018, making him the longest-married Nobel laureate. The Boyers had three children.

Though the Boyers connected with the Mormon community in Wisconsin, they considered themselves "on the wayward fringe" and doubted the doctrinal beliefs of the Church of Jesus Christ of Latter-day Saints (LDS Church). After experimenting with Unitarianism, Boyer eventually became an atheist. In 2003 he was one of 22 Nobel laureates who signed the Humanist Manifesto.

== Academic career ==
After Boyer received his Ph.D. degree in biochemistry from the University of Wisconsin–Madison in 1943, he spent years at Stanford University on a war-related research project dedicated to stabilization of serum albumin for transfusions. He began his independent research career at the University of Minnesota and introduced kinetic, isotopic, and chemical methods for investigating enzyme mechanisms. In 1955, he received a Guggenheim Fellowship and worked with Professor Hugo Theorell on the mechanism of alcohol dehydrogenase. In 1956, he accepted a Hill Foundation Professorship and moved to the medical campus of the University of Minnesota. In 1959–1960, he served as Chairman of the Biochemistry Section of the American Chemical Society (ACS) and in 1969–1970 as President of the American Society of Biological Chemists.

Since 1963, he had been a professor in the department of chemistry and biochemistry at University of California, Los Angeles. In 1965, he became the founding director of the Molecular Biology Institute and spearheaded the construction of the building and the organization of an interdepartmental Ph.D. program. This institutional service did not diminish the creativity and originality of his research program, which led to three postulates for the binding mechanism for ATP synthesis—that energy input was not used primarily to form ATP but to promote the binding of phosphate and mostly the release of tightly bound ATP; that three identical catalytic sites went through compulsory, sequential binding changes; and that the binding changes of the catalytic subunits, circularly arranged on the periphery of the enzyme, were driven by the rotation of a smaller internal subunit. The research that Boyer conducted expanded how scientists think about electron transport and the proton motive force used by cellular organisms and mitochondria in eukaryotic cells. His discoveries were also partially confirmed by the research of John E. Walker, one of his co-laureates for the 1997 Nobel Prize.

Paul Boyer was editor or associate editor of the Annual Review of Biochemistry from 1963 to 1989. He was editor of the classic series, "The Enzymes". When he worked on the series "The Enzymes", he was helped by his wife Lyda as she was a professional editor at UCLA. In 1981, he was faculty research lecturer at UCLA. In that same year, he was awarded the prestigious Tolman Medal by the Southern California Section of the American Chemical Society.

== Death ==
Boyer died of respiratory failure on June 2, 2018, at the age of 99, less than two months shy of his 100th birthday at his Los Angeles home.

== Publications ==
- Dahms, A. S. & P. D. Boyer. "Occurrence and Characteristics of ^{18}O-exchange Reactions Catalyzed By Sodium- and Potassium-dependent Adenosine Triphosphatases", University of California Los Angeles (UCLA), United States Department of Energy (through predecessor agency the Atomic Energy Commission), (1972).
- Kanazawa, T. & P. D. Boyer. "Occurrence and Characteristics of a Rapid Exchange of Phosphate Oxygens Catalyzed by Sarcoplasmic Reticulum Vesicles", University of California Los Angeles (UCLA), United States Department of Energy (through predecessor agency the Atomic Energy Commission), (1972).
- Boyer, P. D. "Isotopic Studies on Structure-function Relationships of Nucleic Acids and Enzymes. Three Year Progress Report, May 1972 — October 1975", University of California Los Angeles (UCLA), United States Department of Energy (through predecessor agency the Energy Research and Development Administration), (1975).
- Boyer, P. D. "Energy Capture and Use in Plants and Bacteria. Final Technical Report", University of California Los Angeles (UCLA), United States Department of Energy, (December 31, 1993).

== Awards and honors ==
Year	Organization	Award title, Category	Refs
1955	American Chemical Society	Paul-Lewis Award in Enzyme Chemistry	
1955	John Simon Guggenheim Memorial Foundation	Guggenheim Fellowship, study in Sweden	
1968	American Academy of Arts and Sciences	Fellow	
1970	National Academy of Sciences	Member	
1974	Stockholm University	Honorary Doctorate	
1976	University of California, Los Angeles	McCoy Award	
1981	American Chemical Society; Southern California Section	Tolman Award	
1981	University of California, Los Angeles	Faculty research lecturer	
1989	American Society for Biochemistry and Molecular Biology	William C. Rose Award	
1996	University of Minnesota	Honorary Doctorate	
1997	Royal Swedish Academy of Sciences	Nobel Prize in Chemistry	
1998	University of California, Los Angeles; Department of Chemistry and Biochemistry	Glenn T. Seaborg Medal	
1998	University of Wisconsin	Honorary Doctorate	
1998	American Academy of Achievement	Golden Plate Award	
1998	American Philosophical Society	Member	
