= R. Tom Baker =

Canadian chemist

- Born: Tsawwassen, British Columbia, Canada
- Education: University of British Columbia and University of California, Los Angeles
- Scientific career
- Fields: Chemistry
- Workplaces: University of Ottawa, Los Alamos National Laboratory, DuPont CR&D
- Doctoral advisor: M. Frederick Hawthorne

R. Tom Baker is an inorganic chemist known for the development and application of inorganic transition metal-based catalysis.

== Education ==
Baker was born in Tsawwassen, British Columbia, Canada. He attended University of British Columbia (UBC) as an undergraduate student and earned his bachelor of science in chemistry in 1975. He then conducted his graduate research work under M. Frederick Hawthorne at University of California, Los Angeles (UCLA). After he earned his doctorate in inorganic chemistry in 1980, he spent a year as a postdoctoral fellow with Philip S. Skell at Pennsylvania State University.

== Career ==
From 1981 to 1996, Baker worked as a research chemist at DuPont CR&D, where he became a homogeneous catalysis scouting group leader in 1993. In 1996 he joined Inorganic Isotopes and Actinides Group at Los Alamos National Laboratory (LANL) to work as a research chemist. In 2008 he joined the faculty at University of Ottawa. He was a director of Centre for Catalysis Research and Innovation from 2008 to 2015. He currently is a Canada Research Chair in Catalysis Science for Energy Applications. In 2009, he was awarded fellowship from the American Association for the Advancement of Science (AAAS).

== Research ==
Baker has made contributions to the development and application of inorganic transition metal-based catalysis in many areas of chemical industry and academia. During the years at DuPont, his research was focused on developing and applying inorganic homogeneous catalysis to industrial products such as fluorocarbons and nylon, as well as developing transition metal boryl compounds such as boryliridium complexes to facilitate the hydroboration of alkenes. After he joined LANL, he turned his interest towards developing sustainable synthetic chemistry with multiphasic, multifunctional catalysis at low temperatures to minimize energy consumption and chemical wastes, as well as B-N containing compounds for chemical hydrogen storage.

Much of his recent research has been focused on sustainability and green chemistry, such as developing efficient transition metal-based catalysts for hydrogen storage compounds in order to utilize hydrogen as an alternate safe and clean energy resource. This includes a broad work of B-N containing compounds such as ammonia-borane (H_{3}NBH_{3}) as an ideal hydrogen fuel carrier, as well as developing inexpensive earth-abundant transition metal-based catalysts such as iron complex to facilitate dehydrogenation process of ammonia-borane with less expenses. His work provides insight into the second hydrogen release step of dehydrogenation by isolation and characterization of reaction intermediate.

Baker also works on utilizing copper and vanadium homogeneous catalysts to facilitate aerobic oxidation of lignocellulose to obtain small monomeric organic molecules which can produce more valuable chemicals and renewable biofuels. This research includes investigating reactivity and oxidation selectivity of different metal catalysts towards a variety of lignin models, a study of C-O bond and C-C bond cleavage pathways towards simple and complex lignin models, and the function of base in the aerobic oxidation process. Baker’s recent research also includes the development of tandem catalytic system to convert ethanol to n-butanol with high selectivity. N-butanol, owing to its high energy density and immiscibility with water, is known as a better renewable biofuel than ethanol.

His group has also made substantial contributions to organofluorine chemistry, especially on metal-based fluorocarbenes, including synthesis of a variety of fluorocarbene transition metal complexes by directly introducing difluorocarbene ligands to transition metal centres such as cobalt and nickel, as well as investigating [2+2] cycloaddition reactions between metal fluorocarbenes and tetrafluoroethylene (TFE), which sheds light on a greener route to produce fluorocarbons from waste polytetrafluoroethylene materials.

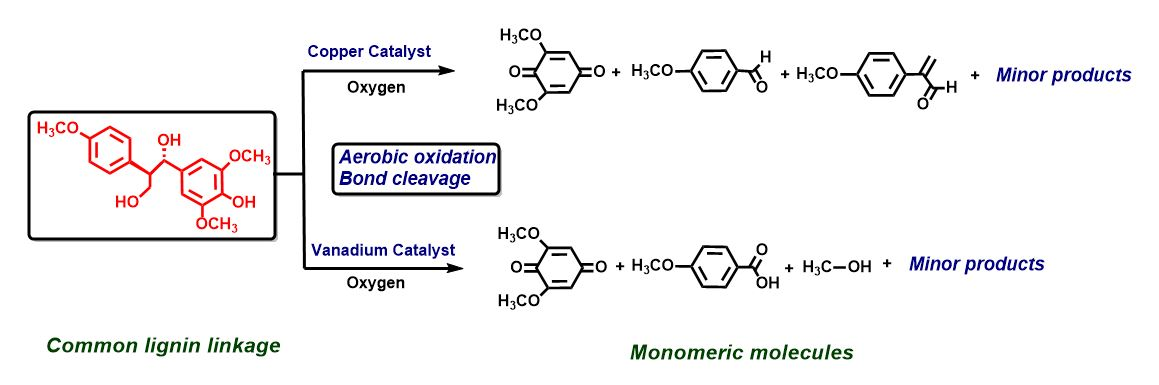
Lignocellulose disassembly to break down common lignin linkage into monomeric molecules by transition metal-based catalysts.

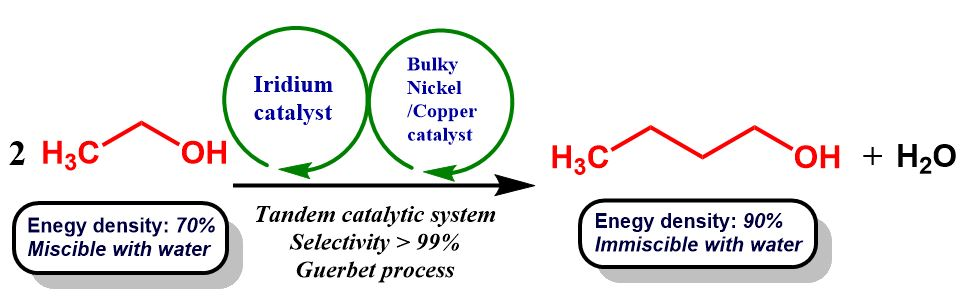
Tandem catalytic system to convert ethanol to n-butanol with high selectivity.
