= 1931 USA Indoor Track and Field Championships =

National athletics championship event

- Dates: February 25 (men); March 14 (women)
- Host city: New York City, New York, United States (men); Newark, New Jersey, United States (women)
- Venue: Madison Square Garden (men); Newark Armory (women)
- Level: Senior
- Type: Indoor
- Events: 20 (13 men's + 7 women's)

The 1931 USA Indoor Track and Field Championships were organized by the Amateur Athletic Union (AAU) and served as the national championships in indoor track and field for the United States.

The men's edition was held at Madison Square Garden in New York City, New York, and it took place February 25. The women's meet was held separately at the Newark Armory in Newark, New Jersey, taking place March 14.

At the women's championships, Stella Walsh retained her 220 yards title, winning by six yards over Catherine Capp.

== Medal summary ==
=== Men ===
| Event | Gold | | Silver | Bronze |
|---|---|---|---|---|
| 60 yards | Ira Singer | 6.5 | | |
| 300 yards | Bill Carr | 32.4 | | |
| 600 yards (Note: The top American and U.S. champion was Eddie Blake in 4th place.) | Phil Edwards (BGU) | 1:12.6 | Sera Martin (FRA) | Alex Wilson (CAN) |
| 1000 yards | Ray Conger | 2:14.1 | | |
| 2 miles | Leo Lermond | 9:11.8 | | |
| 70 yards hurdles | Percy Beard | 8.5 | | |
| 2 miles steeplechase | Hans Assert | 10:16.2 | | |
| High jump | Anton Burg | 1.98 m | | |
| Standing high jump | Harold Osborn | 5 ft 1 in (1.54 m) | | |
| Pole vault | Fred Sturdy | 4.24 m | | |
| Standing long jump | William Werner | 3.30 m | | |
| Shot put | Leo Sexton | 14.91 m | | |
| 1 mile walk | William Carlson | 6:47.8 | | |

=== Women ===
| Event | Gold | | Silver | Bronze |
|---|---|---|---|---|
| 40 yards | Mary Carew | 5.2 | | |
| 220 yards | Stella Walsh (POL) | 27.2 | Catherine Capp | |
| 50 yards hurdles | Evelyne Hall | 7.6 | | |
| High jump | Jean Shiley | 1.60 m | | |
| Standing long jump | Katherine Mearls | 2.50 m | | |
| Shot put | Margaret "Rena" MacDonald | 11.43 m | | |
| Basketball throw | Carolyn Dieckman | 96 ft 2 in (29.31 m) | | |
