= Donald R. Blake =

American chemist (born 1952)

Donald R. Blake (born December 19, 1952, in Orange, California) is an American atmospheric chemist and Distinguished Professor of Chemistry at the University of California, Irvine.

He is known for his work in the measurement and analysis of trace gases in the Earth’s atmosphere, particularly those that contribute to air pollution, ozone depletion, and climate change. His research has informed international environmental policy and contributed to the scientific understanding of atmospheric composition and greenhouse gas trends.

== Early life and education ==
Blake was born in Orange, California on December 19, 1952. He served in the U.S. Navy from 1971 to 1974 before beginning his academic career. Blake earned his B.S. in Chemistry from the University of California, Los Angeles (UCLA) in 1978, followed by both an M.S. (1980) and a Ph.D. in Chemistry (1984) from the University of California, Irvine.

== Academic career ==
Blake joined the Department of Chemistry at UCI initially as a research assistant in 1978, progressing through roles including postdoctoral research and specialist positions, and later becoming a Research Chemist and Associate Research Chemist. He was appointed a Professor of Chemistry in 1998 and was later named Distinguished Professor. His lab often referred to as the Rowland-Blake Group specializes in the measurement of trace atmospheric gases, deploying both ground-based and airborne sampling systems around the world.

== Research and scholarly works ==
Blake’s research centers on the measurement, analysis, and interpretation of trace gases in the Earth’s atmosphere, with particular emphasis on compounds that affect air quality, ozone chemistry, and climate change. His work is widely recognized for establishing long-term, high-quality observational records and for developing practical sampling and analytical approaches used in large international field campaigns.

A central focus of Blake’s scholarship is the quantification of non-methane hydrocarbons, halocarbons, alkyl nitrates, and greenhouse gases especially methane and ethane. Using whole-air sampling combined with high-precision gas chromatography and mass-spectrometric techniques, his laboratory routinely measures dozens to hundreds of trace species at concentrations ranging from parts per billion to parts per trillion and lower. These measurements provide essential constraints on emission sources, atmospheric lifetimes, and chemical processing in the troposphere.

Since the late 1970s, Blake has led and maintained one of the longest continuous global observational programs for atmospheric trace gases. His group has collected regular background air samples from sites extending from high northern latitudes to the Southern Hemisphere, creating a multi-decade record that has been widely used to assess global trends in methane, hydrocarbons, and halogenated compounds. Early in his career, Blake co-authored several of the first papers demonstrating the global rise of atmospheric methane and documenting its interhemispheric gradient and residence time, helping to establish methane as a major anthropogenic greenhouse gas.

A major component of Blake’s scholarly work involves aircraft-based atmospheric field campaigns. He has served as a principal investigator or senior collaborator for whole-air sampling systems deployed on NASA research aircraft, including the DC-8 and P-3B platforms.

His group has participated in numerous international missions designed to characterize the chemical composition of the troposphere and the transport of pollution on regional to global scales. These campaigns include large, multi-agency programs over the Pacific and Asia, such as PEM-Tropics and TRACE-P, as well as later missions focused on continental outflow, urban pollution, biomass burning, and global atmospheric composition, including SEAC4RS, ATom, and FIREX-AQ. Data produced by Blake’s group are widely used to evaluate chemical transport models and to interpret satellite observations.

Blake’s research has made major contributions in several thematic areas:

=== Greenhouse gases and climate change ===
His measurements of methane and light hydrocarbons provided some of the earliest quantitative evidence for sustained global increases and helped identify major natural and anthropogenic source categories. Long-term records produced by his laboratory are now routinely used in assessments of climate forcing and atmospheric budgets.

=== Air pollution and urban chemistry. ===
Blake’s work has helped identify and apportion sources of volatile organic compounds (VOCs) in large metropolitan regions. Studies led by his group demonstrated that in some megacities, emissions from liquefied petroleum gas use and other non-traffic sources can dominate over vehicle exhaust for key hydrocarbons, reshaping understanding of urban ozone formation and informing air-quality control strategies.

=== Ozone-related trace gases and halocarbons. ===
Through measurements of halogenated hydrocarbons and related species, Blake has contributed to the understanding of stratospheric ozone depletion, atmospheric lifetimes of ozone-depleting substances, and the effectiveness of regulatory controls.

=== Long-range transport and atmospheric processing. ===
Aircraft and surface observations from Blake’s group have been used to document the intercontinental transport of pollution plumes, the chemical evolution of organic gases during transport, and the role of oxidation processes in controlling atmospheric composition over oceans, polar regions, and remote continental areas.

Methodologically, Blake is known for developing and refining whole-air sampling canisters, field sampling protocols, and laboratory analytical systems capable of stable, inter-comparable measurements across decades.

Blake has authored and co-authored hundreds of peer-reviewed scientific publications in leading journals such as Nature, Science, Journal of Geophysical Research, Geophysical Research Letters, and Journal of Atmospheric Chemistry.

== Awards and honors ==
- NASA Exceptional Public Service Award (2025)
- American Chemical Society Richard D. Tolman Award (2022)
- University of California, Irvine – Better World Award (2020)
- University of California, Irvine – Lauds and Laurels Award (Alumni) (2020)
- California Air Resources Board Haagen-Smit Clean Air Award (2014)
- American Chemical Society Award for Creative Advances in Environmental Science and Technology (2013)
- University of California, Irvine – Lauds and Laurels Award (Research) (2009)
- Fellow of the American Geophysical Union (AGU) (2009)
- Fellow of the American Association for the Advancement of Science (AAAS) (2008)
- NASA Group Achievement Award (1993, 1998, 2000, 2006, 2008, 2009, 2016, 2018, 2020, 2025)
- Outstanding Professor, Alpha Phi Society (2000, 2002, 2005)
- American Chemical Society Chuck Bennett Award for Service Through Chemistry (2004)
- Excellence in Undergraduate Research Award (2001)
- UC Irvine Chemistry Department Outstanding Teaching Award (1979)
- Bank of America Chemistry Award (1975)
