= W. Conway Pierce =

American chemist

- Born: December 2, 1895; Carrollton, Kentucky
- Died: December 23, 1974 (aged 79)
- Education: B.A. Georgetown College, 1920: M.A University of Chicago, 1925; Ph.D University of Chicago, 1928
- Title: Emeritus professor of chemistry
- Spouse: Kate Shewmaker (m. 1921)
- Children: Willis C. "Bill" Pierce
- Awards: President's Certificate of Merit (1948): Doctor of Science, Georgetown College (1950); Tolman Award (1963); LL.D, University of California, Riverside (1965)
- Scientific career
- Fields: Chemistry
- Thesis: A further study of the reaction between nitrogen dioxide and liquid mercury. An investigation of the mechanism of the photochemical decomposition of malonic acid. (1928)

Willis Conway Pierce (December 2, 1895 – December 23, 1974) was an American chemist and professor at Pomona College and in the University of California system.

== Career ==
Pierce left Georgetown College as a sophomore for New York to serve in the gas defense section of the United States Army Signal Corps. He was in the army from April to December 1918. He subsequently graduated from Georgetown College in 1920. In that same year, he began teaching at the University of Kentucky and later at the University of South Dakota. He stayed on at the University of Chicago after receiving his Ph.D. to teach quantitative analysis. During this time he co-authored seminal chemistry textbook Quantitative Analysis with Edward Lauth Haenisch. Quantitative Analysis would go through 21 editions until 1963. During World War II, Pierce worked for the Office of Scientific Research and Development's National Defense Research Committee. Pierce had been recruited by his doctoral advisor, W. Albert Noyes, Jr., to join the "division 10" central laboratory at Northwestern University. Pierce's lab focused on chemical warfare defense and developed carbon filtering for use in chemical protective masks. Pierce's work included an assignment in Australia and the South Pacific. He was awarded the President's Certificate of Merit in 1948 for his services.

From 1945 to 1953, Pierce served as the chair of the chemistry department at Pomona College. During this time, fellow chemistry professor and well-known practical joker R. Nelson Smith pranked Pierce by releasing several pigeons from the ceiling during one of Pierce's lectures. Pierce took the joke in stride by bringing a shotgun to the next class. Pierce would later co-author a chemistry textbook, Solving General Chemistry Problems, with Nelson. Pierce was recruited by Gordon S. Watkins to serve as the head of the Physical Sciences department at the then newly opened University of California, Riverside (UCR) in 1953. Pierce was awarded the 1963 Honor Scroll from the American Institute of Chemists for "outstanding contributions to the training of chemists and the advancement of the profession."

After retiring from University of California, Riverside in 1965, Pierce provided input on University of California, Irvine's new chemistry building. Pierce Hall on University of California, Riverside is named for him.
