= Peter M. Rentzepis =

American chemist (born 1934)

- Born: 11 December 1934 (age 91); Kalamata, Greece
- Education: Denison University; Syracuse University; University of Cambridge
- Awards: Peter Debye Award (1982); Irving Langmuir Award (1989); Tolman Award (2001)
- Scientific career
- Fields: Physical chemistry
- Workplaces: General Electric; Bell Labs; University of California, Irvine; Texas A&M University
- Doctoral advisor: Sir Morris Sugden
- Notable students: Villy Sundström

Peter Michael Rentzepis (born 11 December 1934) is a Greek-born American physical chemist.

== Education and career ==
Rentzepis is a native of Kalamata born on 11 December 1934. Rentzepis attended the 1st Lykion in his hometown and graduated from Denison University and Syracuse University in the United States before pursuing a doctorate at the University of Cambridge in the United Kingdom, graduating in 1963. Rentzepis, who joined Bell Labs in 1963, after two years at General Electric, led the physical and inorganic chemistry research department at Bell between 1973 and 1985, and taught at the University of California, Irvine from 1974 to 2014, serving in a presidential chair professorship from 1985. In 2014, Rentzepis was appointed TEES Distinguished Professor at Texas A&M University. While at the university, he submitted an application in 1989 and published after patents (US5268862A & US5325324A - Three-dimensional optical memory) approval in 1994. The research was conducted under grant No. F30602-97-C-0014 between the United States Air Force (USAF) acting through its Office of Special Research (AFOSR) and The Regents of the University of California.

== Honors and awards ==
Rentzepis was elected a fellow of the American Physical Society in 1972, and a member of the United States National Academy of Sciences in 1978. He won the 1982 Peter Debye Award from the American Chemical Society, followed in 1989 by the Irving Langmuir Award from the American Physical Society, and in 2001 by the Tolman Award of the ACS Southern California Section.
