= William R. Roush =

American organic chemist

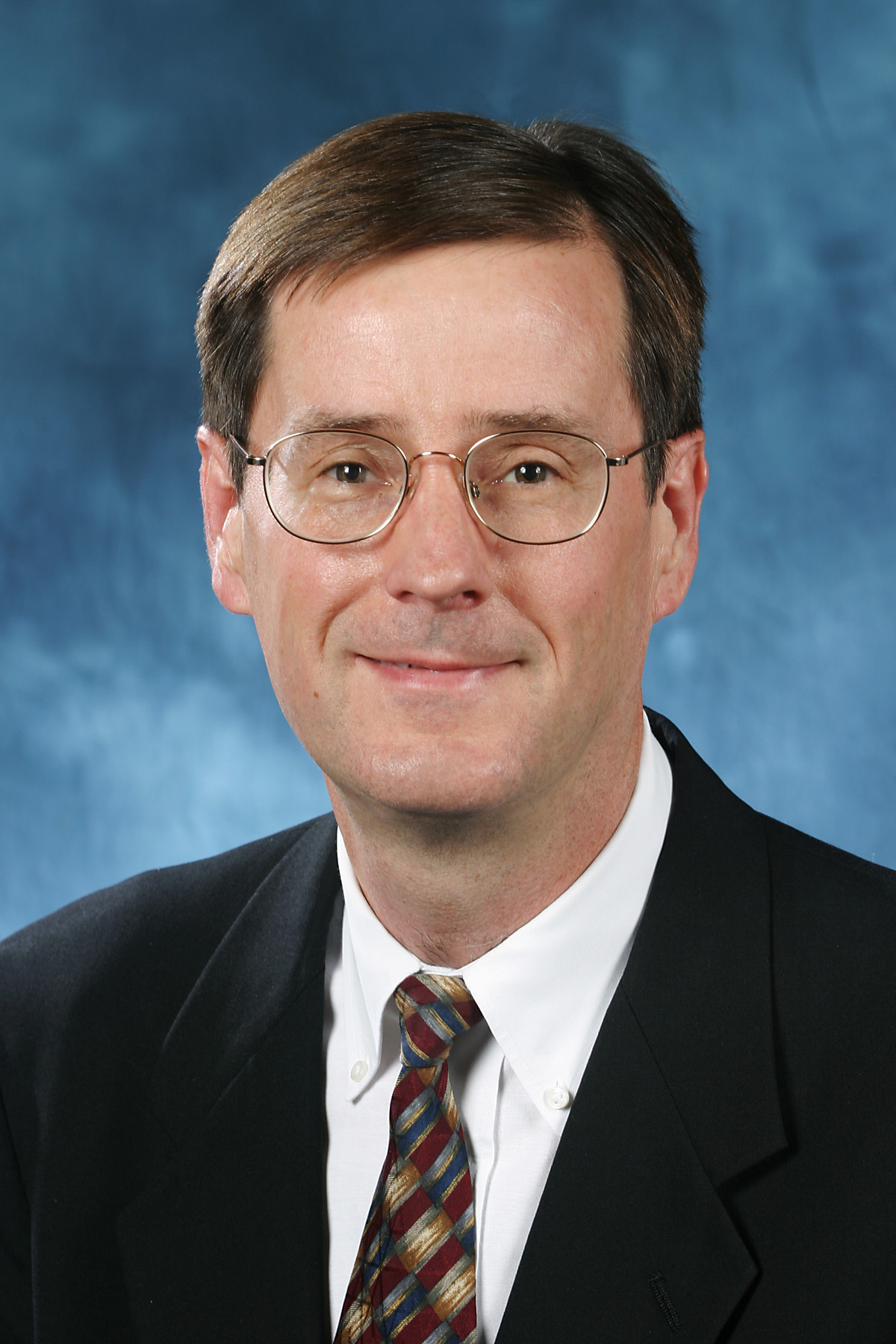
- Born: February 20, 1952 (age 74); Chula Vista, California
- Education: Harvard University; University of California Los Angeles
- Awards: see special list
- Scientific career
- Fields: Organic Chemistry
- Workplaces: The Scripps Research Institute The University of Michigan; Indiana University Massachusetts Institute of Technology
- Doctoral advisor: Robert Burns Woodward

William R. Roush (born February 20, 1952, in Chula Vista, California) is an American organic chemist. He studied chemistry at the University of California Los Angeles (B.S. 1974) and Harvard University (Ph.D. 1977 under Robert Burns Woodward). Following a year postdoctoral appointment at Harvard, he joined that faculty at the Massachusetts Institute of Technology. In 1987, Dr. Roush moved to Indiana University and was promoted to Professor in 1989 and Distinguished Professor in 1995. Two years later, he moved to the University of Michigan in Ann Arbor and served as the Warner Lambert/Parke Davis Professor of Chemistry. He served as chair of the University of Michigan's Department of Chemistry from 2002-2004. In 2004 Professor Roush relocated with his group to the Jupiter, Florida, campus of the Scripps Research Institute (TSRI) where he is currently an emeritus professor.

Roush was active in the field of organic chemistry with research interests including natural product synthesis, methods development and medicinal chemistry. He is known for his stereochemical studies and synthetic applications of the intramolecular Diels-Alder reaction and his work in the area of asymmetric and acyclic diastereoselective synthesis, specifically the use of tartrate ester modified allylboronates and other allylmetal compounds for the aldol-like construction of propionate-derived systems. He has also made important contributions the synthesis of deoxyglycosides and polyhydroxylated natural products, and to the design and synthesis of inhibitors of cysteine proteases targeting important human pathogens (e.g., Trypanosoma, Plasmodium and Entamoeba species).

== Awards ==
William Roush has received numerous awards and honors including:

- Phi Beta Kappa, 1974
- Merck Faculty Development Award, 1981
- Eli Lilly Grantee, 1981–83
- Roger and Georges Firmenich Career Development Chair in Natural Products Chemistry (MIT), 1981–84
- Fellow of the Alfred P. Sloan Foundation, 1982–86
- Alan R. Day Award of the Philadelphia Organic Chemist's Club, 1992
- Arthur C. Cope Scholar Award, American Chemical Society, 1994
- ACS Akron Section Award, 1996
- Merit Award, National Institute of General Medical Sciences, 1998
- Distinguished Faculty Achievement Award, University of Michigan, 1998
- Paul G. Gassman Distinguished Service Award - ACS Division of Organic Chemistry, 2002
- ACS Ernest Guenther Award in the Chemistry of Natural Products, 2004
- Fellow, American Association for the Advancement of Science, 2006
- Fellow, American Chemical Society, 2009
