= Jerry Donohue =

American physical chemist (1920–1985)

Jerry Donohue (June 12, 1920 – February 13, 1985) was an American theoretical and physical chemist. He is best remembered for steering James D. Watson and Francis Crick towards the correct structure of DNA with some crucial information.

== Early career ==
Donohue was born in Sheboygan, Wisconsin and studied for his first two degrees at Dartmouth College, where he earned his A.B. in 1941 and his M.A. in 1943. He worked on his PhD under Linus Pauling at the California Institute of Technology (Caltech), earning his doctorate in 1947. Donohue remained at Caltech until 1952.

== Role in determining structure of deoxyribonucleic acid ==
Throughout his life Donohue specialized in crystal structures and analysis, specifically of molecules relating to biology and hydrogen-bonding. In 1952, Donohue was given a Guggenheim Foundation grant to study at Cambridge University for 6 months. He shared an office with Francis Crick and James D. Watson. In his work to determine the structure of DNA, Watson had been using structure for guanine from a monograph by James N. Davidson. Davidson had depicted these bases in the enol configuration and Watson used this structure in an unsuccessful 'like-with-like' pairing of the bases. Donohue informed Watson that the published structure was just a guess and that the keto structure was more likely, based on a publication of June Broomhead and quantum mechanical calculations. Within a few days, Watson and Crick were able to build their famous model for DNA.

In their famous article by Watson and Crick in Nature that proposed the structure of DNA, the following acknowledgment to Donohue appears: "We are much indebted to Dr. Jerry Donohue for constant advice and criticism, especially on interatomic distances".

== Later life ==
After Cambridge, Donohue became Assistant Professor of Chemistry at the University of Southern California (USC) where he continued to specialize in hydrogen-bonding. He also studied sulfur-containing compounds and began to publish papers more extensively on crystallography and crystal structures. From 1963-1966, he was chairman of the USC Chemistry Department.

In 1966, Donohue joined the chemistry faculty of the University of Pennsylvania (Penn) as the Rhodes-Thompson Professor of Chemistry. In 1974, he published his book The Structures of the Elements. He retired from his Penn position because of ill-health in 1985, and died that same year from cancer.

Donohue was married to Patricia Schreier. They had a son and a daughter. His leisure-time interests included sea shells and horticulture.

== Selected publications ==
J. Donohue. Radial Distribution Functions of Some Structures of the Polypeptide Chain. Proc. Natl. Acad. Sci. USA, 40(6), 377–381 (1954).
J. Donohue and K. Trueblood. The crystal structure of p-nitroaniline. Acta Crystallogr., 9, 960-965 (1956).
J. Donohue, A. Caron, and E. Goldish. Crystal Structure of Rhombohedral Sulphur. Nature, 182, 518 (1958).
J. Donohue. Crystal Structure of Helium Isotopes. Phys. Rev., 114, 1009 (1959).
J. Donohue. A refinement of the positional parameter in α-nitrogen. Acta Crystallogr., 14, 1000 (1961).
F.L. Tucker, J.F. Walper, M.D. Appleman, and J. Donohue. Complete Reduction of Tellurite to Pure Tellurium Metal by Microorganisms. J. Bacteriol., 83(6), 1313–1314 (1962).
B.D. Sharma and J. Donohue. The Crystal and Molecular Structure of Sulfur Nitride, S_{4}N_{4}. Acta Crystallogr., 16, 891 (1963).
J. Donohue, B.D. Sharma and R.E. Marsh. Conformations and hydrogen bonding in codeine and morphine salts. Acta Crystallogr., 17, 249-253 (1964).
H.L. Carrell and J. Donohue. Three Different Isomers in the Same Crystal. Nature, 210, 1149 (1966).
F.L. Tucker, J.W. Thomas, M.D. Appleman, S.H. Goodman, and J. Donohue. X-Ray Diffraction Studies on Metal Deposition in Group D Streptococci. J. Bacteriol., 92(5), 1311–1314 (1966).
J. Donohue, and S.H. Goodman. The Crystal Structure of Adamantane: An Example of a False Minimum in Least Squares. Acta Crystallogr., 22, 352 (1967).
H.L. Carrell and J. Donohue. The Crystal and Molecular Structure of Tetramethylbiphosphine-Bis(monoborane). Acta Crystallogr., B24, 699-707 (1968).
G.J. Palenik, J. Donohue and K.N. Trueblood. The crystal and molecular structure of 3-nitroperchlorylbenzene. Acta Crystallogr., B24, 1139-1146 (1968).
J. Donohue, Structure of "Polywater". Science, 166(3908), 1000-1002 (1969).
A. Caron and J. Donohue. Redetermination of thermal motion and interatomic distances in urea. Acta Crystallogr., B25, 404 (1969).
R. Boggs and J. Donohue. The unit cell and space group of L-tyrosine. Acta Crystallogr., B27, 247 (1971).
N. Mandel and J. Donohue. The Molecular and Crystal Structure of Trifluoromethylarsenie Tetramer (AsCF_{3})_{4}. Acta Crystallogr., B27, 476-480 (1971).
J.P. Chesick and J. Donohue. The molecular and crystal structure of 2-mercaptobenzothiazole. Acta Crystallogr., B27, 1441-1444 (1971).
J. Donohue and H. Einspahr. The structure of β-uranium. Acta Crystallogr., B27, 1740-1743 (1971).
N. Mandel and J. Donohue. The refinement of the crystal structure of skutterudite, CoAs_{3}. Acta Crystallogr., B27, 2288-2289 (1971).
G. Mandel and J. Donohue. The refinement of the structure of hexabromoethane. Acta Crystallogr., B28, 1313-1316 (1972).
H.L. Carrell and J. Donohue. The Crystal and Molecular Structure of Dodecamethylcyclohexasilane. Acta Crystallogr., B28, 1566 (1972).
N. Mandel and J. Donohue. The molecular and crystal structure of 16β,17β-dibromoandrostane. Acta Crystallogr., B28, 308-312 (1972).
K.J. Hwang, J. Donohue, and C.-C. Tsai. The Crystal and Molecular Structure of 12-Methyl-11,13-dioxo-12-aza-pentacyclo[4.4.3.0.^{1,6}0^{2,10}.0^{5,7}]trideca-3,8-diene. Acta Crystallogr., B28, 1727 (1972).
H. Einspahr, R.E. Marsh, and J. Donohue. The Crystal Structure of Potassium Binoxalate. Acta Crystallogr., B28, 2194-2198 (1972).
G. Mandel and J. Donohue. The Crystal and Molecular Structure of Octachloro-2-4-dihydropentalene. Acta Crystallogr., B29, 710-714 (1973).
H. Einspahr, and J. Donohue. The Crystal and Molecular Structure of Dimethyl trans, trans-2,5-Dichloromuconate. Acta Crystallogr., B29, 1875-1880 (1973).
R. Boggs and J. Donohue. Spermine copper(II) perchlorate. Acta Crystallogr., B31, 320-322 (1975).
J. Donohue and J.P. Chesick. The Crystal and Molecular Structure of Dicinnamyl Disulfide. Acta Crystallogr., B31, 986 (1975).
A. Robbins, G.A. Jeffrey, J.P. Chesick, J. Donohue, F. A. Cotton, B.A. Frenz and C.A. Murillo. A refinement of the crystal structure of tetraphenylmethane: three independent redeterminations. Acta Crystallogr., B31, 2395-2399 (1975).
J. Donohue. Structure of graphite. Nature, 255, 172 (1975).
W.C. Stallings, Jr. and J. Donohue. A refinement of the crystal structure of N,N'-diglycyl-L-cystine dihydrate. Acta Crystallogr., B32, 1916-1917 (1976).
R. Boggs and J. Donohue. trans-4a-Acetoxy-8a-chloro-l,4,4a,5,8,8a-hexahydronaphthalene. Acta Crystallogr., B32, 1918-1919 (1976).
G.T. DeTitta, J.W. Edmonds, W. Stallings, and J. Donohue. Molecular structure of biotin. Results of two independent crystal structure investigations. J. Am. Chem. Soc., 98(7), 1920-1926 (1976).
J. Donohue and B.S. Hayward. Crystal structures of two local anesthetics: dibucaine·HCl·H_{2}O and dimethisoquin·HCl·H_{2}O. II. Revised parameters, bond distances, and bond angles. J. Chem. Crystallogr., 10(5-6), 157-161 (1980).
W.C. Stallings, Jr. and J. Donohue. Crystal and molecular structure of analgesics, I. Ciramadol hydrobromide, C_{15}H_{23}O_{2}N·HBr. J. Chem. Crystallogr., 11(3-4), 59-67 (1981).
J. Donohue and W. Stallings, Jr.. Crystal and molecular structure of analgesics. II. Dezocine hydrobromide. J. Chem. Crystallogr., 11(3-4), 69-78 (1981).
J. Donohue and N. Mandel. Molecular structures of menthylS-methyl (S)_{p}-phenyl phosphonothioate and menthyl methyl(R)_{p}-phenylphosphonate. J. Chem. Crystallogr., 11(5-6), 189-196 (1981).
A.B. Smith III, B.H. Toder, P.J. Carroll, and J. Donohue. Andrographolide: an X-ray crystallographic analysis. J. Chem. Crystallogr., 12(4), 309-319 (1982).
H. Katz, T.E. Conturo, P.J. Nigrey and J. Donohue. Naphthaceno[5,6-cd]-1,2-dithiole, C_{18}H_{10}S_{2}. J. Chem. Crystallogr., 13(3), 221-229 (1983).
J. Donohue, A.B. Smith III, and P.J. Carroll. Crystal and molecular structure of reductiomycin. J. Chem. Crystallogr., 14(1), 35-43 (1984).
J.M. Gromek and J. Donohue. Crystal and molecular structure of OC(CoC_{5}H_{5})_{3}(CF_{3}CCCF_{3}). J. Chem. Crystallogr., 14(3), 227-237 (1984).
J. Donohue. Revised space-group frequencies for organic compounds. Acta Crystallogr., A41, 203-204 (1985).
V.A. Santopietro, J. Donohue, and A.B. Smith III. Crystal and molecular structure of hydroxyjatrophone C. J. Chem. Crystallogr., 15(3), 247-255 (1985).
A.B. Smith, III, J.L. Wood, C.J. Rizzo, G.T. Furst, P.J. Carroll, J. Donohue and S. Oreurn, (+)-Hitachimycin: stereochemistry and conformational analysis. J. Am. Chem. Soc., 114, 8003-8007 (1992).
