= William J. Evans (chemist) =

American chemist

William J. Evans is a Distinguished Professor at the University of California, Irvine, who specializes in the inorganic and organometallic chemistry of heavy metals, specifically the rare earth metals (i.e. Sc, Y, and the lanthanides), actinides, and bismuth. He has published over 500 peer-reviewed research papers on these topics.

Evans was born in Madison, Wisconsin, and raised in Menomonee Falls, Wisconsin. He received a Bachelor of Science degree at the University of Wisconsin-Madison in 1969 where he did undergraduate research on pentaborane chemistry with Professor Donald F. Gaines. Subsequently, he attended the University of California, Los Angeles, where he obtained his PhD degree in 1973. His PhD research on the synthesis of metallocarboranes was supervised by Professor M. Frederick Hawthorne. He did postdoctoral research at Cornell University on the synthesis of transition metal phosphite complexes under the direction of Professor Earl L. Muetterties.

Evans began his independent research career in 1975 at the University of Chicago. He chose an area of research completely different from his training and experience, namely the chemistry of the rare-earth metals and actinides, with the central thesis that the special properties of these metals should lead to unique chemistry. He used exploratory synthesis to generate the new molecular species with the appropriate coordination environments to allow the special chemistry of these metals to be accessed. After receiving tenure at Chicago in 1982, he was recruited to the University of California, Irvine, where he has been a Professor since 1983. Among his recent accomplishments at UCI is the discovery of molecular species containing nine new rare earth and actinide oxidation states.

Evans is one of the few people to have received the American Chemical Society (ACS) Awards in both Inorganic Chemistry and Organometallic Chemistry. He has also received the Sir Edward Franklin Award and the Centenary Prize of the Royal Society of Chemistry, the Frank Spedding Award for Excellence in the Science and Technology of Rare Earths, the Terrae Rarae Award of the Tage der Seltenen Erden Society in Germany, the Richard C. Tolman Award of the Southern California Section of the ACS, a Special Creativity Extension Award from the National Science Foundation, the UCI Distinguished Faculty Award for Research, and the UCI Physical Sciences Outstanding Contributions to Undergraduate Education Award. He was also honored with UCI's highest faculty award, the Lauds and Laurels Outstanding Faculty Achievement Award. Recently, he was named Director of the Eddleman Quantum Institute at UCI and has been active in promoting interdisciplinary quantum science.

== Research ==
Evans initially examined metal vapor methods to make new classes of lanthanide complexes in the 0 oxidation state. In efforts to characterize these products he identified the first crystallographically characterized lanthanide hydrides, [(C_{5}H_{5})_{2}(THF)Ln(μ-H)]_{2} (Ln = rare-earth metal), and the first soluble organometallic complex of samarium in the +2 oxidation state, (C_{5}Me_{5})_{2}Sm(THF)_{2}. The latter complex demonstrated that lanthanide complexes could accomplish small molecule activation in unique ways, e.g. by reductive homologation of three CO molecules to (O_{2}CC=C=O)^{2-}. Desolvation of (C_{5}Me_{5})_{2}Sm(THF)_{2} formed the first bent metallocene with no other ligands, (C_{5}Me_{5})_{2}Sm.

Decamethylsamarocene, as it was called, was surprising because it was previously thought that large cyclooctatetraenyl rings were required with lanthanides and actinides to form two ring metallocenes. (C_{5}Me_{5})_{2}Sm was even more unusual in that it had a bent geometry instead of the parallel plane ferrocene-like structure expected for a simple ionic complex of a +2 ion with two large anionic cyclopentadienyl rings.

(C_{5}Me_{5})_{2}Sm provided the first evidence of a rare-earth metal dinitrogen complex, [(C_{5}Me_{5})_{2}Sm]_{2}(μ-η^{2}:η^{2}-N_{2}). More importantly, this was the first example of a coplanar arrangement of dinitrogen with two metal atoms. Previous M_{2}N_{2} complexes had a butterfly geometry in which each metal could interact with a perpendicular N−N pi bond.

Subsequent studies of lanthanide-based dinitrogen reduction led to over forty crystallographically characterized examples of the formerly unprecedented planar M_{2}(μ-η^{2}:η^{2}-N_{2}) structures. These studies also led to the first examples of complexes of (N_{2})^{3-} and (NO)^{2-} radical anions. In collaboration with Professor Jeffrey R. Long, the (N_{2})^{3-} complexes were found to constitute a new class of single-molecule magnets.

Evans' synthetic study of (C_{5}Me_{5})_{2}Sm led to the discovery a series of sterically crowded tris(pentamethylcyclopentadienyl) (C_{5}Me_{5})_{3}M complexes (M = rare earth and actinide). Previously, it was thought that three of these large ligands could not fit around any metal. This discovery was significant because of the metal-ligand bond lengths in these complexes were 0.1 Å longer than conventional distances. The sterically crowded (C_{5}Me_{5})_{3}M complexes exhibit reduction chemistry termed sterically induced reduction (SIR), as well as η^{1}-alkyl reactivity.

Further exploration of dinitrogen reduction led to the synthesis of the first crystallographically characterizable molecular complexes containing Pr^{2+}, Gd^{2+}, Tb^{2+}, Ho^{2+}, Y^{2+}, Er^{2+}, and Lu^{2+} ions. These new lanthanide ions unexpectedly had 4f^{n}5d^{1} electron configurations, and not the conventional 4f^{n+1} configuration generated by reduction of 4f^{n} Ln^{3+} ions of Eu, Yb, Sm, Tm Dy, and Nd. The first molecular complexes of U^{2+} and Th^{2+} were also discovered in the Evans lab. In the Th^{2+} case, the complex contained the first example of any ion with a 6d^{2} electron configuration. This is the configuration expected for superheavy metal ions like Rf^{2+} and Db^{3+}.
