= M. Frederick Hawthorne =

American inorganic chemist (1928–2021)

Fred Hawthorne
- Born: Marion Frederick Hawthorne; August 24, 1928; Fort Scott, Kansas
- Died: July 8, 2021 (aged 92)
- Education: Missouri School of Mines and Metallurgy; Pomona College (B.A., 1949); University of California, Los Angeles (Ph.D., 1953)
- Known for: Boron hydrides
- Awards: Tolman Award (1986); King Faisal International Prize (2003); Priestley Medal (2009); National Medal of Science (2011)
- Scientific career
- Fields: Inorganic chemistry
- Workplaces: University of California, Los Angeles; University of Missouri
- Thesis: The effect of configuration on steric inhibition of resonance in diastereomerically related compounds and The application of Hammett's Rho-Sigma treatment to the termolecular benzoxylation of triphenylmethyl chloride. (1953)
- Doctoral advisor: Donald J. Cram
- Other academic advisors: Corwin Hansch
- Doctoral students: William J. Evans; R. Tom Baker; Omar Farha

Marion Frederick Hawthorne (August 24, 1928 – July 8, 2021) was an inorganic chemist who made contributions to the chemistry of boron hydrides, especially their clusters.

== Early life and education ==
Hawthorne was born on August 24, 1928, in Fort Scott, Kansas. He received his elementary and secondary education in Kansas and Missouri. Prior to high school graduation, he entered the Missouri School of Mines and Metallurgy, Rolla, Missouri through examination as a chemical engineering student. He then transferred to Pomona College, where he received a B.A. degree in chemistry in 1949. While there he conducted research with Corwin Hansch. Hawthorne completed his Ph.D. in organic chemistry under Donald J. Cram at the University of California, Los Angeles in 1953. He conducted postdoctoral research at Iowa State University with George S. Hammond, before joining the Redstone Arsenal Research Division of the Rohm and Haas Company in Huntsville, Alabama.

== Professional career ==
At the Redstone Arsenal, he worked on the chemistry of boron hydrides making several notable discoveries. In 1962, he moved to the University of California, Riverside as professor of chemistry. He moved to the University of California, Los Angeles (UCLA) in 1969. In 1998, he was appointed University Professor of Chemistry at UCLA. He then returned to his home state of Missouri as head of the International Institute of Nano and Molecular Medicine at University of Missouri.

Hawthorne was long associated with the journal Inorganic Chemistry, and was its longest serving editor-in-chief.

== Research ==
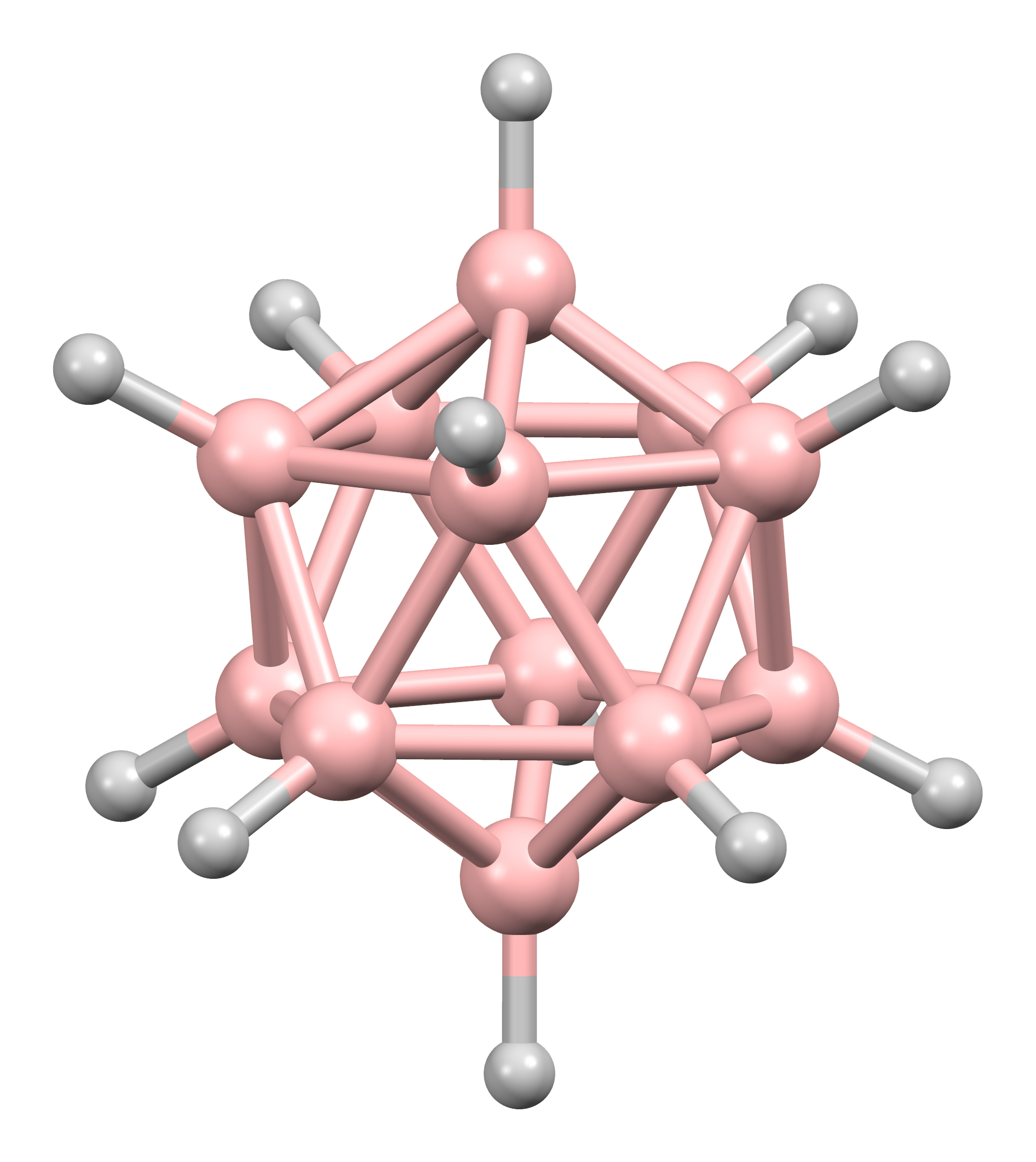
The dodecaborate anion ([B_{12}H_{12}]^{2−}) was discovered by Pitochelli and Hawthorne.

Hawthorne's contributions focused on the chemistry of boron hydride clusters. He discovered dodecaborate anion (B_{12}H_{12}^{2−}) and metal complexes of the dicarbollide anion. His group subsequently discovered the perhydroxylation of B_{12}H_{12}^{2−}.

== Recognition ==
Hawthorne has been widely recognized, including with election to the US National Academy of Sciences.

- 1992 – Honorary doctorate from the Faculty of Mathematics and Sciences at Uppsala University, Sweden
- 1994 – Chemical Pioneer Award from the American Institute of Chemists
- 2009 – Priestley Medal from the American Chemical Society
- 2011 – National Medal of Science
