= Robert Burns Woodward =

American chemist (1917–1979)

Robert Burns Woodward ForMemRS HonFRSE
- Born: April 10, 1917; Boston, Massachusetts, U.S.
- Died: July 8, 1979 (aged 62); Cambridge, Massachusetts, U.S.
- Education: Massachusetts Institute of Technology (BS, PhD)
- Known for: Landmark organic syntheses; Molecular structure determination; Vitamin B12 total synthesis; Woodward cis-hydroxylation; Woodward modification; Woodward synthesis; Woodward's rules; Woodward–Doering quinine synthesis; Woodward–Hoffmann rules; Prévost–Woodward reaction
- Awards: Centenary Prize (1951); ForMemRS (1956); William H. Nichols Medal (1956); Davy Medal (1959); National Medal of Science (1964); Nobel Prize in Chemistry (1965); Willard Gibbs Award (1967); Copley Medal (1978)
- Scientific career
- Fields: Organic chemistry
- Workplaces: Harvard University
- Thesis: A Synthetic Attack on the Oestrone Problem (1937)
- Doctoral advisor: James Flack Norris; Avery Allen Ashdown
- Doctoral students: Christopher Foote; Ken Houk; Ronald Breslow; Stuart Schreiber; William R. Roush; David M. Lemal

Robert Burns Woodward (April 10, 1917 – July 8, 1979) was an American organic chemist, who is considered by many to be the preeminent synthetic organic chemist of the twentieth century.

Through his career, he made many key contributions to the subject, especially in the synthesis of complex natural products and the determination of their molecular structure. He worked closely with Roald Hoffmann on theoretical studies of chemical reactions, and also with Albert Eschenmoser. He received the Nobel Prize in Chemistry in 1965 “for his outstanding achievements in the art of organic synthesis.”

== Early life and education ==
Woodward was born in Boston, Massachusetts, on April 10, 1917. He was the son of Margaret Burns (an immigrant from Scotland who claimed to be a descendant of the poet, Robert Burns) and her husband, Arthur Chester Woodward, himself the son of Roxbury apothecary, Harlow Elliot Woodward.

His father was one of the many victims of the 1918 influenza pandemic.

From a very early age, Woodward was attracted to and engaged in private study of chemistry while he attended a public primary school, and then Quincy High School, in Quincy, Massachusetts. By the time he entered high school, he had already managed to perform most of the experiments in Ludwig Gattermann's then widely used organic chemistry textbook of experimental organic chemistry. In 1928, Woodward contacted the Consul-General of the German consulate in Boston (Baron von Tippelskirch), and through him, managed to obtain copies of a few original papers published in German journals. Later, in his Cope lecture, he recalled how he had been fascinated when, among these papers, he chanced upon Diels and Alder's original communication about the Diels–Alder reaction. Throughout his career, Woodward was to repeatedly and powerfully use and investigate this reaction, both in theoretical and experimental ways.

In 1933, he entered the Massachusetts Institute of Technology (MIT), but neglected his formal studies to the extent that he was excluded at the end of the 1934 fall term. MIT readmitted him in the 1935 fall term, and by 1936 he had received the Bachelor of Science degree. Only one year later, MIT awarded him the doctorate, when his classmates were still graduating with their bachelor's degrees. Woodward's doctoral work involved investigations related to the synthesis of the female sex hormone estrone. MIT required that graduate students have research advisors. Woodward's advisors were James Flack Norris and Avery Adrian Morton, although it is not clear whether he actually took any of their advice. After a short postdoctoral stint at the University of Illinois, he took a Junior Fellowship at Harvard University from 1937 to 1938, and remained at Harvard in various capacities for the rest of his life. In the 1960s, Woodward was named Donner Professor of Science, a title that freed him from teaching formal courses so that he could devote his entire time to research.

== Research and career ==
=== Early work ===
The first major contribution of Woodward's career in the early 1940s was a series of papers describing the application of ultraviolet spectroscopy in the elucidation of the structure of natural products. Woodward collected together a large amount of empirical data, and then devised a series of rules later called the Woodward's rules, which could be applied to finding out the structures of new natural substances, as well as non-natural synthesized molecules. The expedient use of newly developed instrumental techniques was a characteristic Woodward exemplified throughout his career, and it marked a radical change from the extremely tedious and long chemical methods of structural elucidation that had been used until then.

In 1944, with his postdoctoral researcher, William von Eggers Doering, Woodward reported the synthesis of the alkaloid quinine, used to treat malaria. Although the synthesis was publicized as a breakthrough in procuring the hard to get medicinal compound from Japanese occupied southeast Asia, in reality it was too long and tedious to adopt on a practical scale. Nevertheless, it was a landmark for chemical synthesis. Woodward's particular insight in this synthesis was to realize that the German chemist Paul Rabe had converted a precursor of quinine called quinotoxine to quinine in 1905. Hence, a synthesis of quinotoxine (which Woodward actually synthesized) would establish a route to synthesizing quinine. When Woodward accomplished this feat, organic synthesis was still largely a matter of trial and error, and nobody thought that such complex structures could actually be constructed. Woodward showed that organic synthesis could be made into a rational science, and that synthesis could be aided by well-established principles of reactivity and structure. This synthesis was the first one in a series of exceedingly complicated and elegant syntheses that he would undertake.

=== Later work and its impact ===
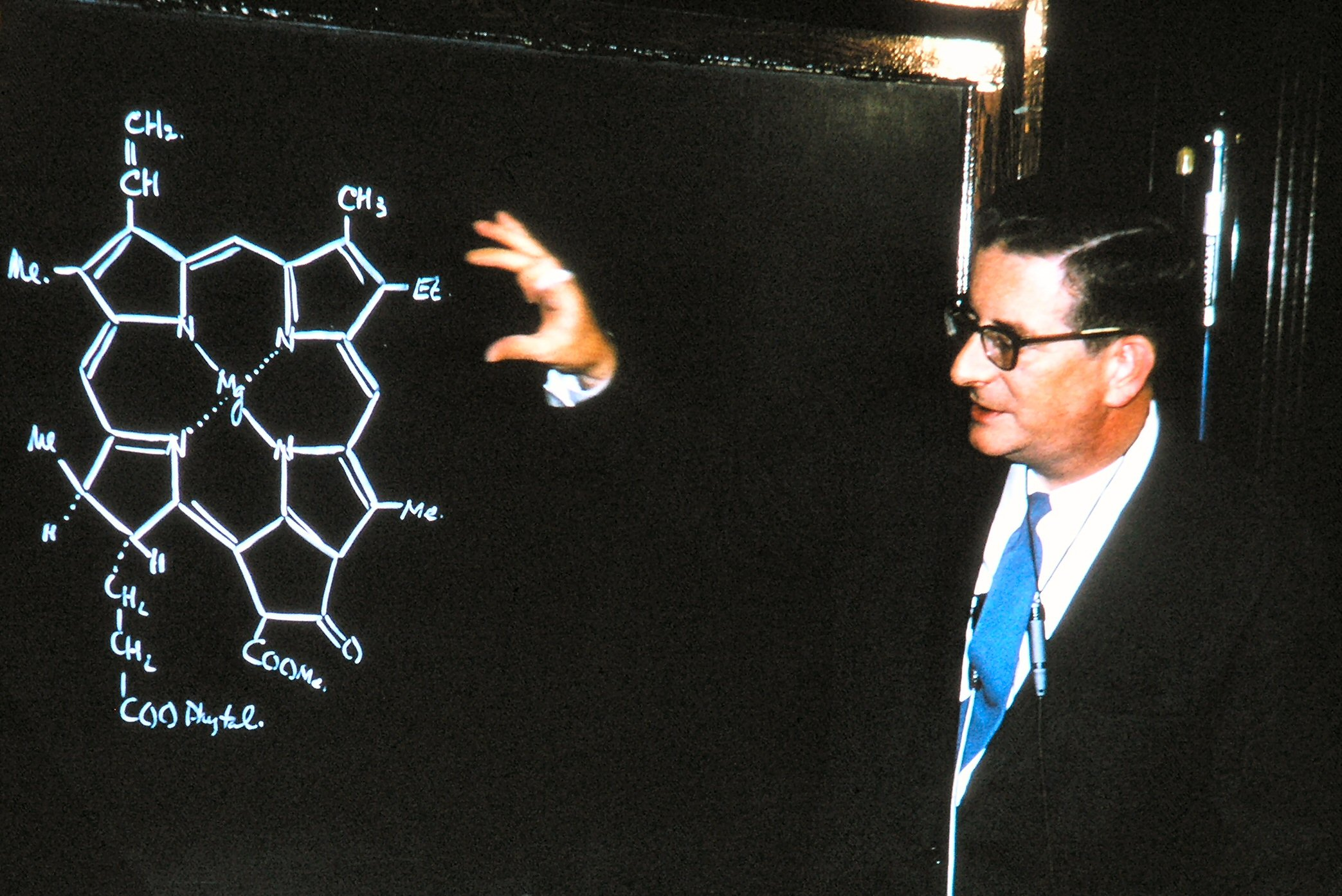
Woodward talked about Chlorophyll in 1965

Culminating in the 1930s, the British chemists Christopher Ingold and Robert Robinson among others had investigated the mechanisms of organic reactions, and had come up with empirical rules which could predict reactivity of organic molecules. Woodward was perhaps the first synthetic organic chemist who used these ideas as a predictive framework in synthesis. Woodward's style was the inspiration for the work of hundreds of successive synthetic chemists who synthesized medicinally important and structurally complex natural products.

=== Organic syntheses and Nobel Prize ===
During the late 1940s, Woodward synthesized many complex natural products including quinine, cholesterol, cortisone, strychnine, lysergic acid, reserpine, chlorophyll, cephalosporin, and colchicine. With these, Woodward opened up a new era of synthesis, sometimes called the 'Woodwardian era' in which he showed that natural products could be synthesized by careful applications of the principles of physical organic chemistry, and by meticulous planning.

Many of Woodward's syntheses were described as spectacular by his colleagues and before he did them, it was thought by some that it would be impossible to create these substances in the lab. Woodward's syntheses were also described as having an element of art in them, and since then, synthetic chemists have always looked for elegance as well as utility in synthesis. His work also involved the exhaustive use of the then newly developed techniques of infrared spectroscopy and later, nuclear magnetic resonance spectroscopy. Another important feature of Woodward's syntheses was their attention to stereochemistry or the particular configuration of molecules in three-dimensional space. Most natural products of medicinal importance are effective, for example as drugs, only when they possess a specific stereochemistry. This creates the demand for 'stereoselective synthesis', producing a compound with a defined stereochemistry. While today a typical synthetic route routinely involves such a procedure, Woodward was a pioneer in showing how, with exhaustive and rational planning, one could conduct reactions that were stereoselective. Many of his syntheses involved forcing a molecule into a certain configuration by installing rigid structural elements in it, another tactic that has become standard today. In this regard, especially his syntheses of reserpine and strychnine were landmarks.

During World War II, Woodward was an advisor to the War Production Board on the penicillin project. Although often given credit for proposing the beta-lactam structure of penicillin, it was actually first proposed by chemists at Merck and Edward Abraham at Oxford and then investigated by other groups, as well (e.g., Shell). Woodward at first endorsed an incorrect tricyclic (thiazolidine fused, amino bridged oxazinone) structure put forth by the penicillin group at Peoria. Subsequently, he put his imprimatur on the beta-lactam structure, all of this in opposition to the thiazolidine–oxazolone structure proposed by Robert Robinson, the then leading organic chemist of his generation. Ultimately, the beta-lactam structure was shown to be correct by Dorothy Hodgkin using X-ray crystallography in 1945.

Woodward also applied the technique of infrared spectroscopy and chemical degradation to determine the structures of complicated molecules. Notable among these structure determinations were santonic acid, strychnine, magnamycin and terramycin. In each one of these cases, Woodward again showed how rational facts and chemical principles, combined with chemical intuition, could be used to achieve the task.

In the early 1950s, Woodward, along with the British chemist Geoffrey Wilkinson, then at Harvard, postulated a novel structure for ferrocene, a compound consisting of a combination of an organic molecule with iron. This marked the beginning of the field of transition metal organometallic chemistry which grew into an industrially very significant field. Wilkinson won the Nobel Prize for this work in 1973, along with Ernst Otto Fischer. Some historians think that Woodward should have shared this prize along with Wilkinson. Remarkably, Woodward himself thought so, and voiced his thoughts in a letter sent to the Nobel Committee.

Woodward won the Nobel Prize in 1965 for his synthesis of complex organic molecules. He had been nominated a total of 111 times from 1946 to 1965. In his Nobel lecture, he described the total synthesis of the antibiotic cephalosporin, and claimed that he had pushed the synthesis schedule so that it would be completed around the time of the Nobel ceremony.

=== B_{12} synthesis and Woodward–Hoffmann rules ===
In the early 1960s, Woodward began work on what was the most complex natural product synthesized to date—vitamin B_{12}. In a remarkable collaboration with his colleague Albert Eschenmoser in Zurich, a team of almost one hundred students and postdoctoral workers worked for many years on the synthesis of this molecule. The work was finally published in 1973, and it marked a landmark in the history of organic chemistry. The synthesis included almost a hundred steps, and involved the characteristic rigorous planning and analyses that had always characterised Woodward's work. This work, more than any other, convinced organic chemists that the synthesis of any complex substance was possible, given enough time and planning (see also palytoxin, synthesized by the research group of Yoshito Kishi, one of Woodward's postdoctoral students). As of 2019, no other total synthesis of Vitamin B_{12} has been published.

That same year, based on observations that Woodward had made during the B_{12} synthesis, he and Roald Hoffmann devised rules (now called the Woodward–Hoffmann rules) for elucidating the stereochemistry of the products of organic reactions. Woodward formulated his ideas (which were based on the symmetry properties of molecular orbitals) based on his experiences as a synthetic organic chemist; he asked Hoffman to perform theoretical calculations to verify these ideas, which were done using Hoffmann's Extended Hückel method. The predictions of these rules, called the "Woodward–Hoffmann rules" were verified by many experiments. Hoffmann shared the 1981 Nobel Prize for this work along with Kenichi Fukui, a Japanese chemist who had done similar work using a different approach; Woodward had died in 1979 and Nobel Prizes are not awarded posthumously.

=== Woodward Institute ===
While at Harvard, Woodward took on the directorship of the Woodward Research Institute, based at Basel, Switzerland, in 1963. He also became a trustee of his alma mater, MIT, from 1966 to 1971, and of the Weizmann Institute of Science in Israel.

=== Death ===
Woodward died in Cambridge, Massachusetts, from a heart attack in his sleep. At the time, he was working on the synthesis of an antibiotic, erythromycin. A student of his said about him:

I owe a lot to R. B. Woodward. He showed me that one could attack difficult problems without a clear idea of their outcome, but with confidence that intelligence and effort would solve them. He showed me the beauty of modern organic chemistry, and the relevance to the field of detailed careful reasoning. He showed me that one does not need to specialize. Woodward made great contributions to the strategy of synthesis, to the deduction of difficult structures, to the invention of new chemistry, and to theoretical aspects as well. He taught his students by example the satisfaction that comes from total immersion in our science. I treasure the memory of my association with this remarkable chemist.

=== Publications ===
During his lifetime Woodward authored or coauthored almost 200 publications, of which 85 are full papers, the remainder comprising preliminary communications, the text of lectures, and reviews. The pace of his scientific activity soon outstripped his capacity to publish all experimental details, and much of the work in which he participated was not published until a few years after his death. Woodward trained more than two hundred Ph.D. students and postdoctoral workers, many of whom later went on to distinguished careers.

Some of his best-known students include Robert M. Williams (Colorado State), Harry Wasserman (Yale), Yoshito Kishi (Harvard), Stuart Schreiber (Harvard), William R. Roush (Scripps-Florida), Steven A. Benner (UF), James D. Wuest (Montreal), Christopher S. Foote (UCLA), Kendall Houk (UCLA), porphyrin chemist Kevin M. Smith (LSU), Thomas R. Hoye (University of Minnesota), Ronald Breslow (Columbia University) and David Dolphin (UBC).

Woodward had an encyclopedic knowledge of chemistry, and a memory for detail. He was able to connect disparate threads of knowledge from the chemical literature and apply them effectively to solve chemical problems.

== Honors and awards ==
For his work, Woodward received many awards, honors and honorary doctorates, including election to the American Academy of Arts and Sciences in 1948, the National Academy of Sciences in 1953, the American Philosophical Society in 1962, and membership in academies around the world. He was also a consultant to many companies such as Polaroid, Pfizer, and Merck. Other awards include:

- John Scott Medal, from the Franklin Institute and City of Philadelphia, 1945
- Leo Hendrik Baekeland Award, from the North Jersey Section of the American Chemical Society, 1955
- Elected a Foreign Member of the Royal Society (ForMemRS) in 1956
- Davy Medal, from the Royal Society in 1959
- Roger Adams Medal, from the American Chemical Society in 1961
- Pius XI Gold Medal, from the Pontifical Academy of Sciences in 1969
- National Medal of Science from the United States in 1964 ("For an imaginative new approach to the synthesis of complex organic molecules and, especially, for his brilliant syntheses of strychnine, reserphine, lysergic acid, and chlorophyll.")
- Nobel Prize in Chemistry in 1965
- Willard Gibbs Award from the Chicago Section of the American Chemical Society in 1967
- Lavoisier Medal from the Société chimique de France in 1968
- The Order of the Rising Sun, Second Class from the Emperor of Japan in 1970
- Hanbury Memorial Medal from The Pharmaceutical Society of Great Britain in 1970
- Pierre Bruylants Medal from the University of Louvain in 1970
- AMA Scientific Achievement Award in 1971
- Cope Award from the American Chemical Society, shared with Roald Hoffmann in 1973
- Copley Medal from the Royal Society, London in 1978

=== Honorary degrees ===
Woodward also received over twenty honorary degrees, including honorary doctorates from the following universities:

- Wesleyan University in 1945;
- Harvard University in 1957;
- University of Cambridge in 1964;
- Brandeis University in 1965;
- Technion Israel Institute of Technology in Haifa in 1966;
- University of Western Ontario in Canada in 1968;
- University of Louvain in Belgium, 1970.

== Personal life ==
=== Family ===
In 1938, he married Irja Pullman; they had two daughters: Siiri Anna (b. 1939) and Jean Kirsten (b. 1944). In 1946, he married Eudoxia Muller, an artist and technician whom he met at the Polaroid Corp. This marriage, which lasted until 1972, produced a daughter, and a son: Crystal Elisabeth (b. 1947), and Eric Richard Arthur (b. 1953).

=== Idiosyncrasies ===
His lectures frequently lasted for three or four hours. His longest known lecture defined the unit of time known as the "Woodward", after which his other lectures were deemed to be so many "milli-Woodwards" long. In many of these, he eschewed the use of slides and drew structures by using multicolored chalk. Typically, to begin a lecture, Woodward would arrive and lay out two large white handkerchiefs on the countertop. Upon one would be four or five colors of chalk (new pieces), neatly sorted by color, in a long row. Upon the other handkerchief would be placed an equally impressive row of cigarettes. The previous cigarette would be used to light the next one. His Thursday seminars at Harvard often lasted well into the night. He had a fixation with blue, and many of his suits, his car, and even his parking space were coloured in blue.

In one of his laboratories, his students hung a large black and white photograph of the master from the ceiling, complete with a large blue "tie" appended. There it hung for some years (early 1970s), until scorched in a minor laboratory fire. He detested exercise, could get along with only a few hours of sleep every night, was a heavy smoker, and enjoyed Scotch whisky and martinis.

== Bibliography ==
- Robert Burns Woodward: Architect and Artist in the World of Molecules; Otto Theodor Benfey, Peter J. T. Morris, Chemical Heritage Foundation, April 2001.
- Robert Burns Woodward and the Art of Organic Synthesis: To Accompany an Exhibit by the Beckman Center for the History of Chemistry (Publication / Beckman Center for the History of Chemistry); Mary E. Bowden; Chemical Heritage Foundation, March 1992
- Woodward R. B.; Sondheimer F.; Taub D. (1951). "The Total Synthesis of Cortisone". Journal of the American Chemical Society. 73 (8): 4057. Bibcode:1951JAChS..73.4057W. doi:10.1021/ja01152a551.
- George B. Kauffman (2004). "Organic Synthesizer par excellence – On the 25th Anniversary of His Death". Chem. Educator. 9: 1–5.
- Robert Burns Woodward on Nobelprize.org
- Video podcast of Robert Burns Woodward talking about cephalosporin
- Robert Burns Woodward: Three Score Years and Then? David Dolphin, Aldrichimica Acta, 1977, 10(1), 3–9.
- Robert Burns Woodward Patents
