= Richard Kaner =

American inorganic chemist

Richard Barry Kaner
- Education: Brown University A.B. (1980); University of Pennsylvania Ph.D. (1984)
- Awards: Tolman Award (2009)
- Scientific career
- Fields: Inorganic Chemistry
- Workplaces: UCLA; University of California, Berkeley
- Thesis: The electrochemistry of reduced polyacetylene (1984)
- Doctoral advisor: Alan G. MacDiarmid
- Other academic advisors: Aaron Wold, Neil Bartlett
- Doctoral students: Jiaxing Huang
- Website: kaner.chem.ucla.edu/home/

Richard B. Kaner is an American synthetic inorganic chemist. He is a distinguished professor and the Dr. Myung Ki Hong Endowed Chair in Materials Innovation at the University of California, Los Angeles, where he holds a joint appointment in the Department of Chemistry and Biochemistry and the Department of Material Science and Engineering. Kaner conducts research on conductive polymers (polyaniline), superhard materials and carbon compounds, such as fullerenes and graphene.

He has been on the board of directors for California NanoSystems Institute. Kaner is Chief Scientific Adviser to Hydrophilix, Nanotech Energy, and Supermetalix, university spin-off companies.

== Career ==
Kaner was an adjunct professor at the Royal Melbourne Institute of Technology in Australia in 2010. He was the Eka-Granules Lecturer at the University of Tasmania, and was a visiting professor at the University of Wollongong. He is an associate editor of the Materials Research Bulletin.

== Awards ==
- ACS Award in Applied Polymer Science (2022)
- American Institute of Chemists Chemical Pioneer Award (2019)
- Royal Society of Chemistry Centenary Prize (2018)
- Materials Research Society Medal (2015)
- Thomson-Reuters Most Highly Cited Author (2014)
- ACS Award in the Chemistry of Materials (2012)
- Southern California Section of the American Chemical Society (SCALACS) Richard C. Tolman Award (2010)
- Fulbright Senior Scholar (2004–2005)
- UCLA Gold Shield Faculty Prize (2002–2004)
- Guggenheim Fellowship (1996)
- Defense Science Study Group Fellowship (1994–95)
- Sloan Research Fellowship (1993–97)
- Camille Dreyfus Teacher-Scholar Award (1991)
- Packard Fellowship (1989)
- American Chemical Society Exxon Fellowship in Solid State Chemistry (1989)

== Professional memberships ==
- American Physical Society Fellow (2020)
- American Chemical Society (ACS) Fellow (2016)
- Fellow of the Royal Society of Chemistry (2015)
- Electrochemical Society Member
- Materials Research Society Fellow (2011)
- American Association for the Advancement of Science Fellow (2000)
