= Christopher Spencer Foote =

American chemist

- Born: June 5, 1935; Hartford, Connecticut
- Died: June 13, 2005 (aged 70); Santa Monica, California
- Education: Yale University, Harvard University
- Known for: Singlet oxygen
- Awards: Alfred P. Sloan Foundation Fellowship; Guggenheim Fellowship; Arthur C. Cope Scholar Award; Tolman Award; Fulbright Award
- Scientific career
- Fields: Chemistry
- Workplaces: UCLA
- Doctoral advisor: Robert Burns Woodward

Christopher Spencer Foote (June 5, 1935 – June 13, 2005) was a professor of chemistry at UCLA and an expert in reactive oxygen species, in particular, singlet oxygen. He published over 250 research articles and has an h-index of 67. He was also known for his textbook Organic Chemistry (with Brown and Iverson).

The American Chemical Society gave him their Baekeland award in 1975, named him a Cope Scholar in 1994, and gave him the Tolman Award in 1995. In 2000 an international symposium in honor of his 65th birthday was held in Hawaii. The Christopher S. Foote Chair of chemistry at UCLA, currently held by Neil Garg, is named after him.

== Education ==
- B.S. Yale University (1957)
- Ph.D. Harvard University, Organic Chemistry, (1962)
  Research advisor, R.B. Woodward, "Angle strain and solvolytic reactivity in bridged bicyclic systems."

== Research and Teaching Appointments ==
- Assistant Professor, University of California, Los Angeles, 1962–1969
- Professor, University of California, Los Angeles, 1969–2005

== Research ==
=== Reactive oxygen species ===
Diels-Alder reaction with singlet oxygen, oxidative damage of DNA.
