= Joan S. Valentine =

American biochemist

Joan Selverstone Valentine
- Born: 1945 (age 80–81); Auburn, California
- Citizenship: United States
- Education: Princeton University (Ph.D. 1971); Smith College (A.B. 1967)
- Known for: superoxide dismutase, superoxide radical
- Scientific career
- Fields: Bioinorganic chemistry, Biochemistry
- Workplaces: University of California, Los Angeles

Joan Selverstone Valentine (born 1945) is a biological inorganic chemist and biochemist. Valentine's current work examines the role of transition metals, metalloenzymes, and oxidative stress in health. Her foremost expertise is superoxide anion and its functional enzyme superoxide dismutase. Valentine has been a member of the faculty of the University of California, Los Angeles since 1980. She served as associate editor of the journal Inorganic Chemistry from 1989 to 1995, and served as Editor-in-Chief of Accounts of Chemical Research from 1994 to 2013. In 2005, she was elected to the National Academy of Sciences.

== Early life and education ==
Joan S. Valentine was born in Auburn, California in 1945. In 1967, she graduated with a Bachelor of Arts in Chemistry from Smith College and a Ph.D. in Inorganic Chemistry from Princeton University in 1971, where she conducted inorganic photochemistry on dicobalt-dioxygen complexes. After a year as an Instructor at Princeton, she was appointed Assistant Professor of Chemistry at Rutgers University in New Brunswick in 1972.

== Career ==
In 1972, she moved to Rutgers University where she served as Assistant, Associate and Professor of Chemistry. In 1980, she moved to UCLA as Professor of Chemistry. From 1991 to 1994, she also served as Departmental Vice Chair for Research and Administration. Valentine served as Director of the UCLA Chemistry-Biology Interface Predoctoral Training Program from 1993 to 2001. In recent years Valentine has researched iron-sulfur cluster formation and spontaneous oxidation in prebiotic oceans. Her work was coauthored and published in the Journal of Inorganic Biochemistry in June 2026.

== Awards ==
- Research Career Development Award, NIH (1976–1981)
- Alpha Chi Sigma Faculty Research, UCLA (1985)
- Smith Medal, Smith College (1991)
- McCoy Award, Caltech (1996)
- John C. Bailar, Jr. Medal for Research in Coordination Chemistry, University of Illinois (2004)
- Glenn T. Seaborg Medal (2008)
