= Corwin Hansch =

American pharmacologist

- Born: Corwin Herman Hansch; October 6, 1918; Kenmare, North Dakota, US
- Died: May 8, 2011 (aged 92); Claremont, California, US
- Education: University of Illinois Urbana-Champaign; New York University
- Known for: Hansch equation QSAR
- Spouse: Gloria J. Hansch (nee Tomasulo) (m.1945?–2011) (his death) (1 child)
- Awards: Tolman Award (1975)
- Scientific career
- Fields: Organic Chemistry
- Workplaces: Pomona College; Manhattan Project
- Thesis: Syntheses of 3-substituted thianaphthenes (1944)
- Doctoral advisor: Harry Gustave Lindwall

Corwin Herman Hansch (October 6, 1918 – May 8, 2011) was a professor of chemistry at Pomona College in California. He became known as the 'father of computer-assisted molecule design.'

== Education and career ==
Hansch was born on October 6, 1918, in Kenmare, North Dakota. He earned a Bachelor of Science in chemistry from the University of Illinois at Urbana-Champaign in 1940 and a PhD from New York University in 1944. He briefly worked as a postdoctoral researcher at the University of Illinois Chicago.

Hansch worked on the Manhattan Project at the University of Chicago and as a group leader at DuPont Nemours in Richland, Washington. In February 1946 he received an academic position at Pomona College, where he taught until 1988. Hansch completed sabbaticals at ETH Zurich with Vladimir Prelog and at the Ludwig-Maximilians-Universität München (LMU) with Rolf Huisgen.

Hansch taught Organic Chemistry for many years at Pomona College, and was known for giving complex lectures without using notes. His course in Physical Bio-Organic Medicinal Chemistry was ground-breaking at an undergraduate level.

Hansch may be best known as the father of the concept of quantitative structure-activity relationship (QSAR), the quantitative correlation of the physicochemical properties of molecules with their biological activities.

He is also noted for the Hansch equation, which is used in

- Multivariate Statistics - Multivariate statistics is a set of statistical tools to analyse data (e.g., chemical and biological) matrices using regression and/or pattern recognition techniques.
- Hansch Analysis - Hansch analysis is the investigation of the quantitative relationship between the biological activity of a series of compounds and their physicochemical substituent or global parameters representing hydrophobic, electronic, steric and other effects using multiple regression correlation methodology.
- Hansch-Fujita $\pi$ constant - The Hansch-Fujita $\pi$ constant describes the contribution of a substituent to the lipophilicity of a compound.

Research Interests: Organic Chemistry; Interaction of organic chemicals with living organisms, Quantitative Structure Activity Relationships (QSAR).

- Fragment based regression analysis for quantitative structure-activity relationship (Hansch-analysis)

== Death ==
He died of pneumonia on May 8, 2011, in Claremont, California, at 92.

== Notes ==
His research group at Pomona College worked on QSAR studies and in building and expanding the database of chemical and physical data as C-QSAR and Bioloom. His postgraduate associates were Rajni Garg, Cynthia R. D. Selassie, Suresh Babu Mekapati, and Alka Kurup.

The Journal of Computer-Aided Molecular Design carried four obituaries (as found in a Pubmed personal subject [ps] search).

Among his students at Pomona was Jennifer Doudna, co-recipient of the 2020 Nobel Prize in Chemistry. Doudna has credited Hansch as an influence.

== Bibliography ==
A preliminary search in WorldCat and in PubMed, two among many relevant bibliographic and citation indexes, shows the following:

- Books: WorldCat shows "53 works in 204 publications in 4 languages and 2,004 library holdings" for Hansch as "author, editor, other". The top item in the list is "Exploring QSAR" by Corwin Hansch, Albert Leo and David Hoekman, an ACS professional reference book in 28 editions published between 1995 and 2014.
- Journal articles: 281 Pubmed records
- Reviews: authored 33 reviews as indexed in Pubmed
- Title word search: 56 Pubmed records

The Pomona College Archives holds reprints of Hansch's articles published between 1962 and 2009 in addition to other materials.

== See also ==
- Hammett equation
- Craig plot
- David Weininger
