= Sukh Dev =

Indian organic chemist, academic and writer (1924–2024)

- Dev in 2003
- Born: 17 June 1923; Chakwal, Punjab Province, British India
- Died: 16 October 2024 (aged 101); Bhavnagar, Gujarat, India
- Education: University of the Punjab; IISc, Bangalore (Ph.D); IISc, Bangalore (D.Sc)
- Known for: Research on terpenoids Contributions to the development of guggulsterone
- Awards: Padma Bhushan; Shanti Swarup Bhatnagar Prize for Science and Technology; IISc Sudborough Medal; ICS Acharya P. C. Ray Award: INSA Vishwakarma Medal; ACS Ernest Guenther Award; IISc Distinguished Alumnus Award; VASVIK Industrial Research Award; FICCI Award; INSA Professor T. R. Seshadri Seventieth Birthday Commemoration Medal; INSA Meghnad Saha Medal; Third World Academy of Sciences Award; ISCA Srinivasan Ramanujan Birth Centenary Award; ICS Lifetime Achievement Award; CRSI Lifetime Achievement Award
- Scientific career
- Fields: Organic chemistry; Natural products chemistry
- Workplaces: Indian Institute of Science; National Chemical Laboratory; Malti-Chem Research Centre, Nandesari; Indian Institute of Technology Delhi
- Thesis: Studies in Sesquiterpenes (1950 (Ph.D.); 1960 (D.Sc.))
- Doctoral advisor: Praphulla Chandra Guha; John D. Roberts
- Doctoral students: Jhillu Singh Yadav, Goverdhan Mehta

Sukh Dev FNA, FASc (17 June 1923 – 16 October 2024) was an Indian organic chemist, academic, researcher and writer, known for his contributions in the development of guggulsterone, a plant-derived steroid used as a therapeutic and nutritional agent. He conducted advanced research in biomedical science and natural products chemistry and held 55 patents for his findings.

Dev was a recipient of several honours including the Shanti Swarup Bhatnagar Prize, the highest Indian award in science and technology. In 2008, the Government of India awarded him the Padma Bhushan, the third highest civilian honour of India, for his contributions to science and technology.

== Biography ==
Sukh Dev was born on 17 June 1923 at Chakwal, in the Punjab province of British India to Hari Chand Lala and Maya Vanti. He graduated with honours from Dayanand Anglo Vedic College, Lahore of the Punjab University in 1943 and secured his master's degree (MSc) from the same institution in 1945. He then joined the Indian Institute of Science, Bangalore (IISc) as a research associate. Moving to India after the Partition, he studied under noted natural products chemist Praphulla Chandra Guha at the IISc, obtaining his PhD in 1948. After taking his doctorate, he conducted post-doctoral research at the Massachusetts Institute of Technology with John D. Roberts.

From 1951 to 1953, he was a senior research fellow at IISc. and continued there as a lecturer in organic chemistry from 1953 to 1959, with a brief stint as a research associate at the University of Illinois at Urbana–Champaign in 1957–58 under Elias James Corey. After securing the degree of DSc from IISC in 1960, he joined the National Chemical Laboratory, Pune the same year as the Head (Assistant Director) of the Organic Chemistry (Natural Products) Division where he stayed till 1974, with a promotion to deputy director in 1968. In 1974, he was appointed director of the Malti-Chem Research Centre in Nandesari where he worked till 1988. In 1989, he joined the Indian Institute of Technology, New Delhi as the INSA S. N. Bose Research Professor, shifting to the Dr. B.R. Ambedkar Centre For Biomedical Research of Delhi University in 1994 where he was a visiting professor.

Dev died on 16 October 2024, at the age of 101.

== Legacy ==
Sukh Dev conducted research on terpenoids and contributed to the structural elucidation of a number of them. It was during these investigations that he discovered new skeletal types in Sesqui- and diterpenoids. Based on his research, he proposed two rules: the Absolute Stereochemistry Biogenetic Rule and that exotic biological materials tend to produce exotic secondary metabolites. He focused a part of his research on lac, turpentine, Cedrus deodara (Devadaaru) and Indian medicinal plants such as Guggulu, Commiphora wightii, the last of which has resulted in the development of Guggulsterone, a steroid claimed to have cholesterol-lowering and nutrient properties. His research earned him 55 patents and the body of his work has been documented in over 290 scientific articles. He published 10 books, including Prime Ayurvedic Plant Drugs, a 2006 publication which explores the ancient and modern traditions of Ayurveda. He also mentored 92 research scholars, which included many notable scientists.

== Awards and honours ==
Sukh Dev received the Sudborough Medal of the Indian Institute of Science in 1949 when he was working at the institution as a research associate but the first major award came his way in 1964 when the Council of Scientific and Industrial Research (CSIR) awarded him Shanti Swarup Bhatnagar Prize, the highest Indian honour in the science and technology categories. In the 1970s, he received two awards; Acharya P. C. Ray Award of Indian Chemical Society in 1970 and Vishwakarma Medal of Indian National Science Academy in 1979. The American Chemical Society awarded him the Ernest Guenther Award in 1980 and he was selected for the Distinguished Alumnus Award of the Indian Institute of Science, the VASVIK Industrial Research Award, and the FICCI Award of the Federation of Indian Chambers of Commerce and Industry the same year. He received two awards from the Indian National Science Academy in the 1980s, Professor T. R. Seshadri Seventieth Birthday Commemoration Medal in 1981 and Meghnad Saha Medal in 1987.

Sukh Dev, who held the INSA S. N. Bose Research Professorship of the Indian Institute of Technology, New Delhi from 1988 to 1993, received the TWAS Prize in 1988 and the Srinivasan Ramanujan Birth Centenary Award of the Indian Science Congress Association in 1992. He was awarded the Lifetime Achievement Award by two Indian chemical societies, the Indian Chemical Society in 1999 and the Chemical Research Society of India in 2000. The Government of India included him in the Republic Day honours list in 2008 for the civilian award of the Padma Bhushan. In 2023, he was honoured by the board of the American Chemical Society for "60 Years of Service Excellence," and his 100th birthday was celebrated with a festschrift published in Organic and Biomolecular Chemistry.

== See also ==
- Diterpenoid
- Guggulsterone
