= J. D. Roberts (disambiguation) =

J. D. Roberts (1932–2021), American football player and coach.

J.D. Roberts is also the name of:

- John D. Roberts (1918–2016), American chemist
- John Roberts (journalist) (born 1956), Canadian-American television journalist
