= Christopher Alabi =

American chemist

Christopher Akinleye Alabi
- Education: New York University; Stevens Institute of Technology; California Institute of Technology
- Scientific career
- Workplaces: Cornell University
- Thesis: I. Synthesis and Proton Conductivity Studies of Mesostructured Organosilicates and Bitriazole-Polymer Composites. II. Targeted Nanoparticles for siRNA Delivery. (2009)
- Doctoral advisor: Mark E. Davis
- Other academic advisors: Robert S. Langer; David Israel Schuster
- Website: Alabi Lab

Christopher A. Alabi is an American chemist and associate professor of chemistry at Cornell University. His research considers the design of sustainable materials and biomolecular therapeutics. He was elected to the American Institute for Medical and Biological Engineering in 2023.

== Early life and education ==
Alabi studied chemistry at New York University, where he completed undergraduate research project with David Schuster. He earned a joint bachelor's degree in chemistry and chemical engineering at NYU and the Stevens Institute of Technology. He later said that much of his success in academia came from his strong friendships and network at NYU. He moved to the California Institute of Technology for his doctoral research, where he worked alongside Mark E. Davis. He joined Massachusetts Institute of Technology as an NIH Postdoctoral Fellow with Robert S. Langer.

== Research and career ==
In 2013 Alabi joined the faculty at Cornell University. His group make use of synthetic and analytical probes to understand and engineer macromolecular therapeutics. He creates sequence-defined macromolecules for stimuli-response and identifies optimised drug delivery bioconjugates.

== Awards and honours ==
- PhRMA Foundation Research Starter Award
- 2016 Cornell Engineering Research Excellence Award
- 2018 Tau Beta Pi Professor of the Year Award
- 2018 Polymer Science and Engineering Young Investigator Award
- 2022 Cornell University College Teaching Award
- 2023 Elected Fellow of the American Institute for Medical and Biological Engineering

== Select publications ==
- Davis, Mark E.; Jonathan E. Zuckerman; Chung Hang J. Choi; David Seligson; Anthony Tolcher; Christopher A. Alabi; Yun Yen; Heidel, Jeremy; Antoni Ribas (2010). "Evidence of RNAi in humans from systemically administered siRNA via targeted nanoparticles". Nature. 464 (7291): 1067–70. Bibcode:2010Natur.464.1067D. doi:10.1038/nature08956. PMC 2855406. PMID 20305636. Wikidata Q29615957.
- Chung Hang J Choi; Christopher A Alabi; Paul Webster; Davis, Mark E. (2009). "Mechanism of active targeting in solid tumors with transferrin-containing gold nanoparticles". Proceedings of the National Academy of Sciences of the United States of America. 107 (3): 1235–1240. Bibcode:2010PNAS..107.1235C. doi:10.1073/pnas.0914140107. PMC 2824286. PMID 20080552. Wikidata Q33666994.
- Gaurav Sahay; William Querbes; Christopher Alabi; et al. (2013). "Efficiency of siRNA delivery by lipid nanoparticles is limited by endocytic recycling". Nature Biotechnology. 31 (7): 653–658. doi:10.1038/nbt.2614. PMC 3814166. PMID 23792629. Wikidata Q37270647.
