= Anil Mishra =

Indian medical academic

Anil Mishra is an Indian doctor, scientist and professor of Medicine. He directs the Eosinophilic Disorder Centre at Tulane School of Medicine.

== Early life and education ==
Mishra had his BSc and PhD from Maharaja College, Jaipur and Kanpur University, India respectively. His researches were focused on Indian environmental pollution and its impact to human health especially the Bhopal disaster.

== Career ==
Mishra has contributed to the field of pulmonary diseases and eosinophilic disorders, role of eosinophils in allergic and gastrointestinal diseases. Mishra and other researchers at Tulane have spent time researching the disease, Eosinophilic esophagitis (EoE), an inflammatory disease that affects 1 in 1,500 children, and are working on potential treatments.

== Awards ==
Mishra is an elected fellow of the American Academy of Allergy, Asthma & Immunology (FAAAAI) and the American Gastroenterological Association (AGA).

== Publications ==
- Mishra, A.; Hogan, S. P.; Lee, J. J.; Foster, P. S.; Rothenberg, M. E. (June 1999). "Fundamental signals that regulate eosinophil homing to the gastrointestinal tract". The Journal of Clinical Investigation. 103 (12): 1719–1727. doi:10.1172/JCI6560. ISSN 0021-9738. PMC 408388. PMID 10377178.
- Blanchard, Carine; Wang, Ning; Stringer, Keith F.; Mishra, Anil; Fulkerson, Patricia C.; Abonia, J. Pablo; Jameson, Sean C.; Kirby, Cassie; Konikoff, Michael R.; Collins, Margaret H.; Cohen, Mitchell B.; Akers, Rachel; Hogan, Simon P.; Assa’ad, Amal H.; Putnam, Philip E. (2006-02-01). "Eotaxin-3 and a uniquely conserved gene-expression profile in eosinophilic esophagitis". The Journal of Clinical Investigation. 116 (2): 536–547. doi:10.1172/JCI26679. ISSN 0021-9738. PMC 1359059. PMID 16453027.
- Mishra, A.; Hogan, S. P.; Brandt, E. B.; Rothenberg, M. E. (January 2001). "An etiological role for aeroallergens and eosinophils in experimental esophagitis". The Journal of Clinical Investigation. 107 (1): 83–90. doi:10.1172/JCI10224. ISSN 0021-9738. PMC 198543. PMID 11134183.
- Zimmermann, Nives; King, Nina E.; Laporte, Johanne; Yang, Ming; Mishra, Anil; Pope, Sam M.; Muntel, Emily E.; Witte, David P.; Pegg, Anthony A.; Foster, Paul S.; Hamid, Qutayba; Rothenberg, Marc E. (2003-06-15). "Dissection of experimental asthma with DNA microarray analysis identifies arginase in asthma pathogenesis". The Journal of Clinical Investigation. 111 (12): 1863–1874. doi:10.1172/JCI17912. ISSN 0021-9738. PMC 161427. PMID 12813022.
- Manohar, Murli; Verma, Alok Kumar; Venkateshaiah, Sathisha Upparahalli; Sanders, Nathan L.; Mishra, Anil (2017-02-06). "Pathogenic mechanisms of pancreatitis". World Journal of Gastrointestinal Pharmacology and Therapeutics. 8 (1): 10–25. doi:10.4292/wjgpt.v8.i1.10. ISSN 2150-5349. PMC 5292603. PMID 28217371.
- Venkateshaiah, S.U.; Mishra, A.; Manohar, M.; Verma, A.K.; Rajavelu, P.; Niranjan, R.; Wild, L.G.; Parada, N.A.; Blecker, U.; Lasky, J.A.; Mishra, A. (2018). "A critical role for IL-18 in transformation and maturation of naive eosinophils to pathogenic eosinophils". Journal of Allergy and Clinical Immunology. 142 (1): 301–305. doi:10.1016/j.jaci.2018.02.011. PMC 6035772. PMID 29499224.
- Yadavalli, Chandra Sekhar; Upparahalli Venkateshaiah, Sathisha; Kumar, Sandeep; Kandikattu, Hemanth Kumar; Oruganti, Lokanatha; Kathera, Chandra Sekhar; Mishra, Anil (2023-07-31). "Allergen-induced NLRP3/caspase1/IL-18 signaling initiate eosinophilic esophagitis and respective inhibitors protect disease pathogenesis". Communications Biology. 6 (1): 763. doi:10.1038/s42003-023-05130-4. ISSN 2399-3642. PMC 10390481. PMID 37524769.
