= Cucurbitacin Delta23-reductase =

Class of enzymes

cucurbitacin delta23-reductase

Identifiers
- EC no.: 1.3.1.5
- CAS no.: 37256-38-5

Databases
- IntEnz: IntEnz view
- BRENDA: BRENDA entry
- ExPASy: NiceZyme view
- KEGG: KEGG entry
- MetaCyc: metabolic pathway
- PRIAM: profile
- PDB structures: RCSB PDB PDBe PDBsum
- Gene Ontology: AmiGO / QuickGO
Search
- PMC: articles
- PubMed: articles
- NCBI: proteins

In enzymology, cucurbitacin Delta23-reductase (EC 1.3.1.5) is an enzyme that catalyzes the chemical reaction

cucurbitacin b
+ NADH
H^{+}
H^{+}
dihydrocucurbitacin b
+ NAD^{+}

The three substrates of this enzyme are the plant steroid curbitacin b, reduced nicotinamide adenine dinucleotide (NADH), and a proton. Its products are dihydrocucurbitacin b, and oxidised NAD^{+}. The enzyme can use nicotinamide adenine dinucleotide phosphate as an alternative cofactor.

This enzyme belongs to the family of oxidoreductases, specifically those acting on the CH-CH group of donor with NAD+ or NADP+ as acceptor. The systematic name of this enzyme class is 23,24-dihydrocucurbitacin:NAD(P)+ Delta23-oxidoreductase. This enzyme is also called NAD(P)H: cucurbitacin B Delta23-oxidoreductase. It contains manganese.
