= Jhillu Singh Yadav =

Indian organic chemist (born 1950)

- Born: 4 August 1950 (age 76); Azamgarh, Uttar Pradesh, India
- Education: Banaras Hindu University; National Chemical Laboratory; Malti Chem Research Centre; Rice University; University of Wisconsin–Madison
- Known for: Studies on organic syntheses of allylic and acetylenic alcohols
- Awards: 1991 Shanti Swarup Bhatnagar Prize; 199 VASVIK Industrial Research Award; 2000 Ranbaxy Research Award; 2003 Vigyan Ratna Samman; 2003 Goyal Award; 2004 Vigyan Gaurav Samman Award
- Scientific career
- Fields: Agrochemicals; Pheromones
- Workplaces: National Chemical Laboratory; Indian Institute of Chemical Technology
- Doctoral advisor: Sukh Dev

Jhillu Singh Yadav (born 4 August 1950) is an Indian organic chemist and the co-founder of the Indo-French Joint Laboratory for Sustainable Chemistry at Interfaces (JLSCI), jointly established by the Indian Institute of Chemical Technology and the University of Rennes 1. He is a former director of Indian Institute of Chemical Technology (IICT) and is known for his studies on organic syntheses of allylic and acetylenic alcohols and spiroacetals. He is an elected fellow of the Indian National Science Academy, the Indian Academy of Sciences National Academy of Sciences, India, Indian Institute of Chemical Engineers and The World Academy of Sciences. The Council of Scientific and Industrial Research, the apex agency of the Government of India for scientific research, awarded him the Shanti Swarup Bhatnagar Prize for Science and Technology, one of the highest Indian science awards, in 1991, for his contributions to chemical sciences.

== Biography ==
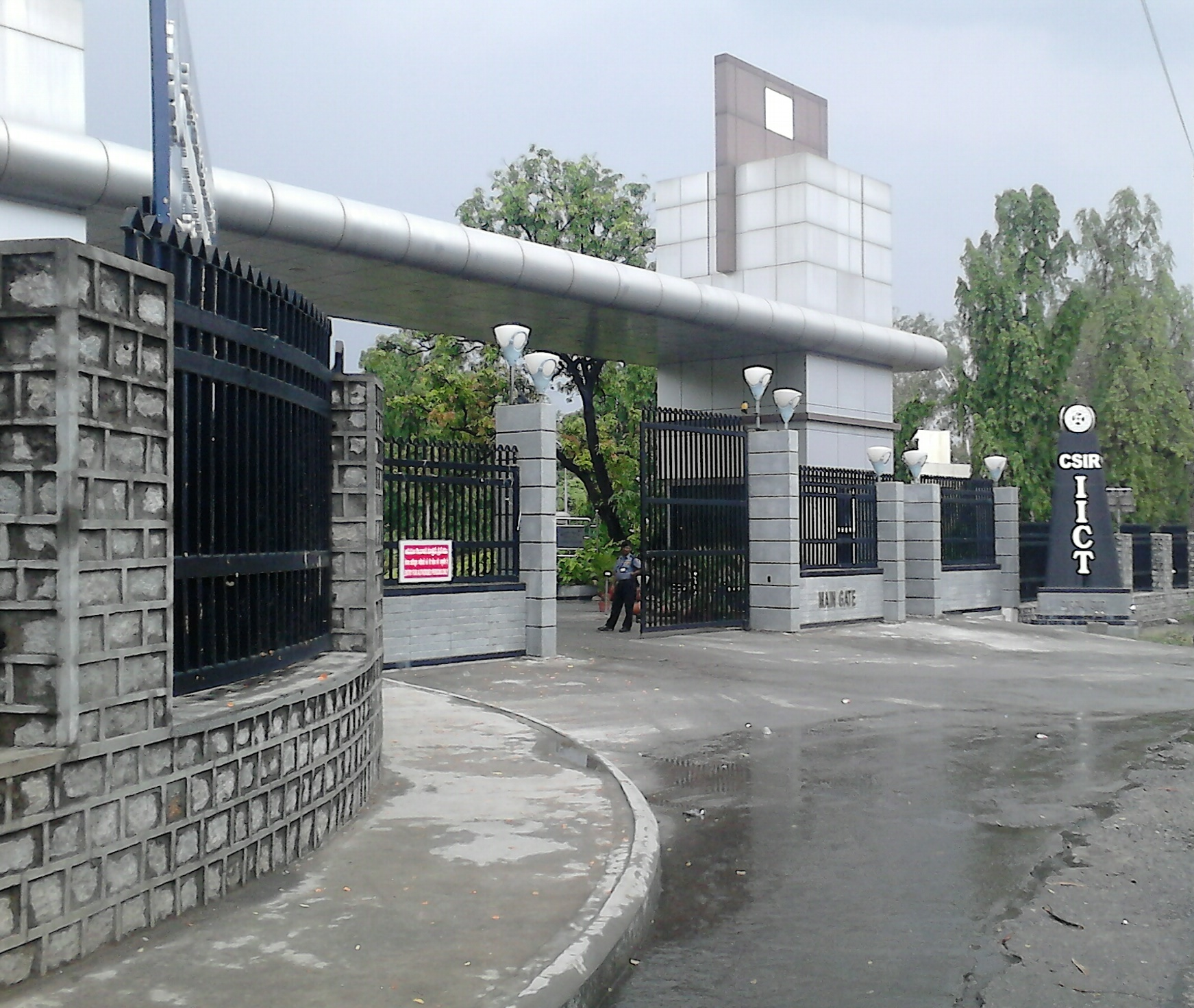
Indian Institute of Chemical Technology

J. S. Yadav was born on 4 August 1950 at Azamgarh, a town in the eastern border of the Indian state of Uttar Pradesh and after completing his early schooling locally, he did his graduate and master's studies at Banaras Hindu University in 1968. His doctoral studies were at National Chemical Laboratory under the guidance of Sukh Dev and on securing a PhD, he had a short stint at Rice University during 1977–78. Subsequently, he did his post-doctoral studies at University of Wisconsin from 1979 to 1980 and returned to India to join National Chemical Laboratory as a scientist in 1980. Later, he moved to Indian Institute of Chemical Technology where he served as its Director till his superannuation from service. Post-retirement in 2012, he continued his association with IICT as a Bhatnagar Fellow of the Council of Scientific and Industrial Research till 2017. He is presently associated with Indrashil University at Ahmedabad as Director (Research)]].

Yadav is married to Janaki and the couple has two sons. The family lives in Kadi in Gujarat.

== Legacy ==
Yadav is known for his studies on the synthesis of complex natural products and drugs and is credited with the development of protocols for synthesizing allylic and acetylenic alcohols and for spiroacetals. His researches are reported to have led to over 27000 citations and 150+ patents (he holds 47 of them) and have resulted in developing cost effective methodologies for the synthesis of pharmaceutical and agrochemicals such as Diltiazem, Ondasetron, Pyrazinamide, Ketotifen, Mefloquin and Tamoxifin. He has published over 1300 peer-reviewed articles and guided over 250 research scholars in their studies. His work on pheromones assisted in evolving an Integrated Pest Management for developing environmentally friendly agro products. Along with René Grée, he is the founder of the Indo-French Joint Laboratory for Sustainable Chemistry at Interfaces (JLSCI), established jointly by the University of Rennes 1 and the Indian Institute of Chemical Technology where he served as its founder director.

== Awards and honours ==
The Council of Scientific and Industrial Research awarded Yadav the Shanti Swarup Bhatnagar Prize, one of the highest Indian science awards, in 1991. He received the VASVIK Industrial Research Award in 1999 and the Ranbaxy Research Award in 2000. The year 2003 brought him two awards, Vigyan Ratna Samman and Goyal Award and he received Vigyan Gaurav Samman Award in 2004. He is an elected fellow of all the three major Indian science academies viz. the Indian National Science Academy, National Academy of Sciences, India and Indian Academy of Sciences. He is also a fellow of the Indian Institute of Chemical Engineers and an elected fellow of The World Academy of Sciences. Arkivoc journal issued a festschrift on Yadav by way of its Issue II of 2016. He is also the recipient of the 22nd Khwarizmi International Award, IROST-UNESCO, Iran".

== See also ==
- Diltiazem
- Pyrazinamide
- Ketotifen
- Pheromones
