= Phytosteroid =

Naturally occurring steroids that are found in plants

Digitoxin, a phytosteroid and cardiac glycoside found in digitalis.

Phytosteroids, also known as plant steroids, are naturally occurring steroids that are found in plants. Examples include digoxin, digitoxin, diosgenin, and guggulsterone, as well as phytosterols (Note: The relationship between phytosteroids and phytosterols is akin to the relationship between steroids and sterols: the latter is a subset of the former, specifically those with a hydroxyl group at the 3-position.) like β-sitosterol.

== Industrial use ==
Steroid pharmaceuticals that are identical or similar to human steroid hormones are very widely used in medicine. However, the four-ring structure of a steroid is quite expensive to replicate using direct synthetic methods.

In 1938–1940, American chemist Russell Earl Marker developed the process known as Marker degradation, which converts diosgenin from Mexican Dioscorea yams into 16-dehydropregnenolone acetate, which has a four-ring structure and can be used to synthesize commonly used steroid hormones. Marker's process reduced the price of progesterone from $80/gram in early 1944 to $2/gram in 1951.

Also in 1940, American chemist Percy Lavon Julian discovered a process to convert a much more abundant phytosteroid -- stigmasterol from soybean -- into progesterone. Stigmasterol is a byproduct of soybean oil refinement. His process was improved by Padmanabhan Sundararaman and Carl Djerassi in 1977, just as stocks of wild Mexican yam became depleted. Soy stigmasterol soon replaced yam diosgenin as the main starting material for hormone production globally.
