= Dorothy Semenow =

American chemist, first woman graduate student at Caltech

Dorothy Ann Semenow is an American chemist, psychologist, and women's rights activist. She was the first woman to earn a PhD from the California Institute of Technology (Caltech). Semenow has also been a strong proponent of the women's rights movement, having consulted for the leadership of Los Angeles NOW.

== Education ==
Semenow obtained her Bachelor of Arts in chemistry from Mount Holyoke College, having graduated summa cum laude. In 1953, she became the first woman to obtain a PhD from the California Institute of Technology, which she obtained in chemistry with a minor in biology. She would then go on to Claremont Graduate University where she would obtain her second PhD in psychology.

=== First female PhD recipient at Caltech ===
Prior to Semenow in 1953, the California Institute of Technology did not grant doctoral degrees to female students. However, renowned physical organic chemist John D. Roberts insisted on allowing her into the program. Roberts later commented that Semenow's inclusion in his group was "clearly the best thing I have done at Caltech in the 60 years I have been here."

== Research interests ==
Semenow is particularly interested in the psychology of creativity and the self, CRISPR technology, and women's rights, particularly concerning discrimination and bias in the sciences based on gender.

Semenow also developed the board game DNA Ahead, which focuses on DNA and its applications to biotechnology. Through this game, Semenow hopes to foster critical thinking as well as encourage more diversity in the sciences.

== Awards and honors ==
Semenow received numerous awards during her undergraduate studies as well as various fellowships that include the following:

- American Chemical Society Student Award
- Phi Beta Kappa Key
- Mount Holyoke College Skinner Postdoctoral Fellowship
- National Science Foundation (NSF) Postdoctoral Fellowship
- Blue Mountain Center for Writers, Artists, and Activists Post Doctoral Fellowship

Semenow was also the recipient of 5 additional postdoctoral fellowships funded by either the NSF or National Institutes of Health (NIH).
