= Pregnenolone 16α-carbonitrile =

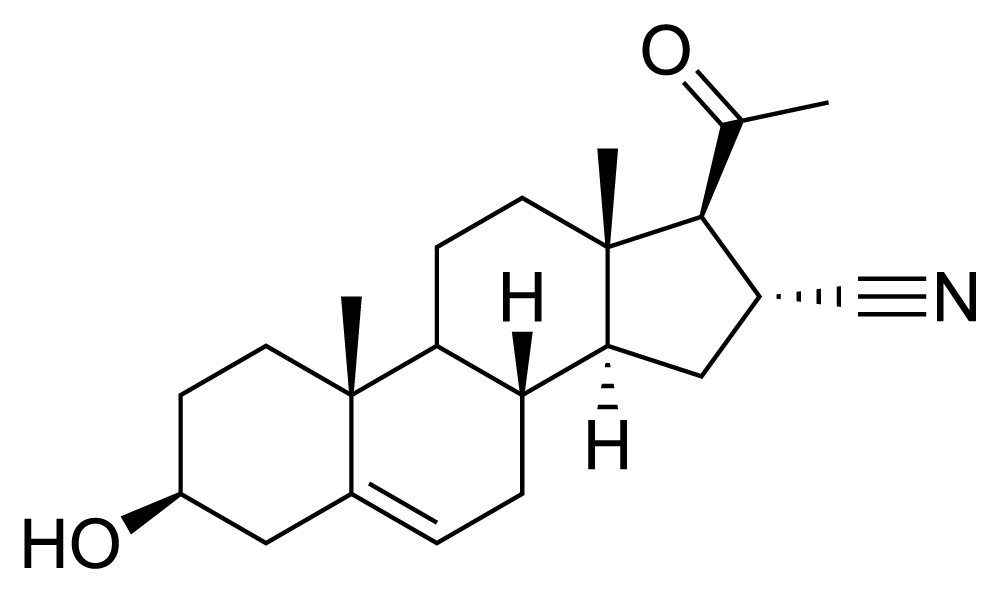

Names
- IUPAC name 3β-Hydroxy-20-oxopregn-5-ene-16α-carbonitrile
- Systematic IUPAC name (1S,2R,3as,3bS,7S,9aR,9bS,11aS)-1-Acetyl-7-hydroxy-9a,11a-dimethyl-2,3,3a,3b,4,6,7,8,9,9a,9b,10,11,11a-tetradecahydro-1H-cyclopenta[a]phenanthrene-2-carbonitrile

Identifiers
CAS Number	1434-54-4
3D model (JSmol)	Interactive image
ChEMBL	ChEMBL1400945
ChemSpider	14308
IUPHAR/BPS	2762
PubChem CID	15032
UNII	BA9WH84QAJ
CompTox Dashboard (EPA)	DTXSID7037262
- InChI: InChI=1S/C22H31NO2/c1-13(24)20-14(12-23)10-19-17-5-4-15-11-16(25)6-8-21(15,2)18(17)7-9-22(19,20)3/h4,14,16-20,25H,5-11H2,1-3H3/t14-,16-,17+,18-,19-,20-,21-,22-/m0/s1 Key: VSBHRRMYCDQLJF-ZDNYCOCVSA-N; InChI=1/C22H31NO2/c1-13(24)20-14(12-23)10-19-17-5-4-15-11-16(25)6-8-21(15,2)18(17)7-9-22(19,20)3/h4,14,16-20,25H,5-11H2,1-3H3/t14-,16-,17+,18-,19-,20-,21-,22-/m0/s1 Key: VSBHRRMYCDQLJF-ZDNYCOCVBP
- SMILES: CC(=O)[C@H]1[C@@H](C[C@@H]2[C@@]1(CC[C@H]3[C@H]2CC=C4[C@@]3(CC[C@@H](C4)O)C)C)C#N

Properties
Chemical formula	C_{22}H_{31}NO_{2}
Molar mass	341.49 g/mol
- Except where otherwise noted, data are given for materials in their standard state (at 25 °C [77 °F], 100 kPa). verify (what is ?) Infobox references

Pregnenolone 16α-carbonitrile (PCN) is a synthetic, steroidal antiglucocorticoid and pregnane X receptor agonist.

== Synthesis ==
16-DPA is reacted with potassium cyanide to give a 68% crop of needles.

== See also ==
- Pregnenolone
- Mifepristone
- Ketoconazole
- Dexamethasone
