= Shivdeen Pandit =

Prime minister of Jaipur state

Pandit Shivdeen
- Royal Coat of Arms of Kingdom of Amber

Prime Minister of Jaipur state
- In office 1852–1864
- Preceded by: Thakur Lachman Singh
- Succeeded by: Pandit Vishambhardeen
- In office 1852 – 1864 November

Personal details
- Born: Rewa, Madhya Pradesh
- Died: 1864 Jaipur, Rajasthan

Military service
- Branch/service: Kingdom of Amber
- Years of service: 1835 - 1864

Pandit Shivdeen was a minister of the Kingdom of Amber and also its prime minister from 1852 to 1864.

== Early life ==
Shivdeen was born at Rewa in a Kanyakubja Brahmin family. He attended Agra College and later was appointed guardian of Sawai Ram Singh II in 1835.

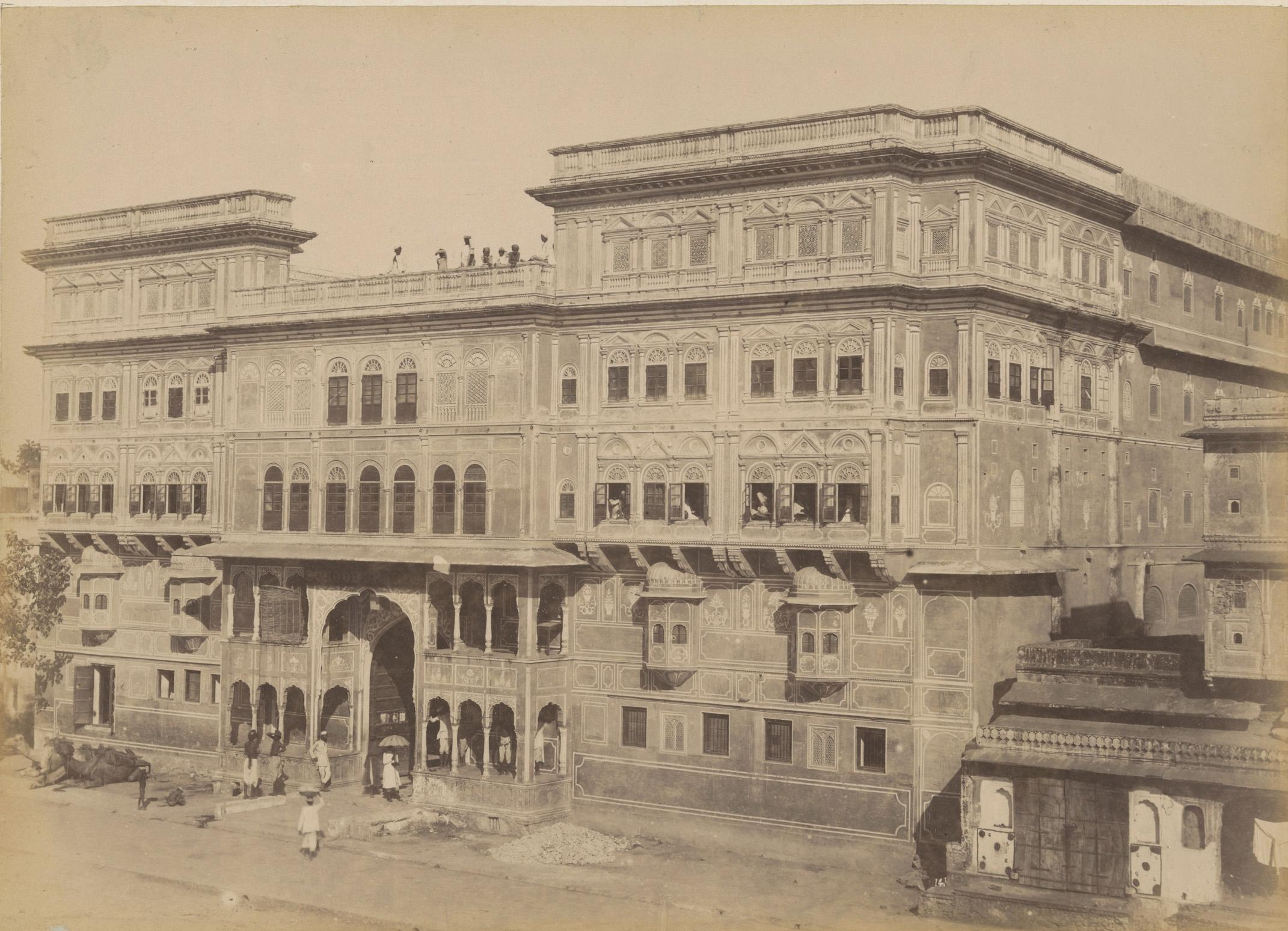
Pandit Shivdeen ki Haweli, Jaipur, Rajasthan

== Political career ==
Shivdeen was an enlightened student of the Agra College with a high level of education and great administrative capacity. From guardianship of the maharaja he rose gradually as civil judge, and Musahib or prime minister. His strict fidelity and uprightness earned him the implicit confidence of his master. He was so popular and amiable that throughout the long period during which he occupied the office not a single individual complained of having received a wrong at his hand. He guided the State through political warfare without significant incident. In 1844, Sawai Ram Singh II founded the Maharaja College, Jaipur with Shivdeen as its first principle. After Sawai Ram Singh II ascended to the throne in 1852, he appointed his guardian Shivdeen as Mohatmim Tehsil or Revenue commissioner. After a couple of years, Shivdeen was appointed as prime minister. He was succeeded by his son Vishambhar Deen.
