= William Bachovchin =

American chemist and biologist

William W. Bachovchin
- Occupations: Chemist/chemical biologist, academic, and researcher
- Awards: Research Career Development Award, National Institutes of Health (NIH); Member, National Academy of Inventors

Academic background
- Education: Wake Forest University; California Institute of Technology

William W. Bachovchin is an American chemist/chemical biologist, academic and researcher. He is a professor of Molecular and Chemical Biology at Tufts University School of Medicine, and the founder of three biopharmaceutical companies: Point Therapeutics, Arisaph Pharmaceuticals, and Bach BioSciences.

Bachovchin has published over 100 articles, and is the inventor of 58 issued US patents. His research has focused primarily on a family of proteolytic enzymes known as the serine proteases and has ranged from studies of their catalytic mechanisms at the molecular level, to identifying their biological functions, to the design and development of drugs targeting them. His work has made extensive use of NMR spectroscopy, mutagenesis, chemical synthesis, and in vivo testing of drug candidates in animal models.

== Education ==
Bachovchin attended Wake Forest University, from which he received his B.S. degree in Biology in 1970, and completed his Graduate Studies in Chemistry in 1972. He then earned his PhD in chemistry from the California Institute of Technology in 1977, under the supervision of John H. Richards. Following this, he served as a Postdoctoral fellow at The California Institute of Technology with John D. Roberts until 1978, and at Harvard Medical School with Bert L. Vallee until 1979.

== Career ==
Bachovchin began his academic career as an assistant professor at Tufts University School of Medicine in 1979. He was subsequently promoted to associate professor in 1984, and became a professor in the Department of Biochemistry at Tufts University School of Medicine in 1989. Bachovchin was also a member of the outside advisory committee of the Stable Isotopes Resource of Los Alamos National Labs for 12 years, serving as chairman for 8 from 1985 to 1993.

Bachovchin has also founded three biopharmaceutical companies: Point Therapeutics in 1997, Arisaph Pharmaceuticals in 1999, and Bach BioSciences LLC in 2018 for which he currently serves as president, CEO, and chief scientist.

== Research ==
=== Enzymology ===
Notable contributions from Bachovchin's early work on enzyme mechanism include that he was the first to incorporate 15N into an enzyme active site and observe the behavior of a key catalytic residue by 15N NMR spectroscopy. The results of that work resolved a controversy regarding the charge-relay hypothesis. Later, his work also helped resolve another controversy over low-barrier hydrogen bonds.

Another notable early contribution includes resolving a discrepancy between results obtained by X-ray diffraction of an enzyme in the crystalline state versus results obtained by NMR spectroscopy of the enzyme in the solution state. He resolved the dispute by examining both states by NMR spectroscopy. The results confirmed crystalline and solution state enzymes did indeed differ and explained why they differed.

In the area of Engzymology, Bachovchin obtained direct evidence for a hydrogen bond involving a carbon-bonded proton as the hydrogen bond donor in an enzyme active site using NMR spectroscopy. On the basis of this discovery, his research team proposed a new mechanism, dubbed "the reaction-driven ring flip".

=== Drug design and discovery ===
Bachovchin's work in the area of drug design and development has led to the design, synthesis and characterization of specific substrates and inhibitors for a number of enzymes including all members of the DASH family of enzymes. He designed, synthesized and characterized high potency inhibitors of DPP4 and then used them to interrogate the biological function of DPP4, work which demonstrated that DPP4 inhibitors had blood glucose lowering activity and therefore the potential for the treatment of diabetes. More recently his work has shown that DPP8/9 inhibitors trigger an immune response. He also designed, synthesized, and characterized specific substrates and inhibitors for Fibroblast Activation Protein (FAP), and has shown that the FAP-specific substrates can be used to deliver anticancer agents specifically to tumors while FAP-specific inhibitors can be used to deliver radioactive metals specifically to tumor for imaging or for therapy.

== Awards and honors ==
- 1983–1988 – Research Career Development Award, National Institutes of Health (NIH)
- 2020 – Inducted into National Academy of Inventors

== Bibliography ==
- Roediger, B., Lee, Q., Tikoo, S., Cobbin, J. C., Henderson, J. M., Jormakka, M., ... & Weninger, W. (2018). An atypical parvovirus drives chronic tubulointerstitial nephropathy and kidney fibrosis. Cell, 175(2), 530–543.
- Panaro, B. L., Coppage, A. L., Beaudry, J. L., Varin, E. M., Kaur, K., Lai, J. H., ... & Drucker, D. J. (2019). Fibroblast activation protein is dispensable for control of glucose homeostasis and body weight in mice. Molecular metabolism, 19, 65–74.
- Schwake, C., Baldwin, M. R., Bachovchin, W., Hegde, S., Schiemer, J., Okure, C., ... & Chishti, A. H. (2019). HIV protease inhibitors block parasite signal peptide peptidases and prevent growth of Babesia microti parasites in erythrocytes. Biochemical and biophysical research communications, 517(1), 125–131.
- Shin, J., Phelan, P. J., Gjoerup, O., Bachovchin, W., & Bullock, P. A. (2021). Characterization of a single chain variable fragment of nivolumab that targets PD-1 and blocks PD-L1 binding. Protein Expression and Purification, 177, 105766.
- Henderson, J. M., Xiang, M. S., Huang, J. C., Wetzel, S., Jiang, L., Lai, J. H., ... & Gorrell, M. D. (2021). Dipeptidyl Peptidase Inhibition Enhances CD8 T Cell Recruitment and Activates Intrahepatic Inflammasome in a Murine Model of Hepatocellular Carcinoma. Cancers, 13(21), 5495.
