= Joseph B. Lambert =

American chemist (born 1940)

Joseph B. Lambert (born 1940) is an educator, organic chemist, archaeological chemist, and nuclear magnetic resonance spectroscopist. He grew up in the San Antonio, Texas, area and graduated from Alamo Heights High School in 1958. He was educated at Yale University (B.S., 1962, summa cum laude), where he worked for William von Eggers Doering, and at California Institute of Technology (Ph.D., 1965), where he worked for John D. Roberts. In 1965, he joined the faculty of Northwestern University in Evanston, Illinois, where he rose through the ranks and in 1991 became Clare Hamilton Hall Professor of Chemistry. In 2010, he retired after 45 years at Northwestern and moved to Trinity University in San Antonio to assume his current position as Research Professor of Chemistry.

== Northwestern University (1965-2010) ==
In 1973, Lambert was a Guggenheim Fellow at the Research Laboratory of the British Museum, and, in 1976, he received the National Fresenius Award. In 1989, he received the Fryxell Award from the Society for American Archaeology in recognition of his chemical contributions to archaeology. He was the 1998 recipient of the Frederic Stanley Kipping Award in Silicon Chemistry of the American Chemical Society (ACS) and in 2012 was named a Fellow of the American Chemical Society. He received the Carol and Harry Mosher Award of the Santa Clara Valley Section of the ACS in 2003 and the Sidney M. Edelstein Award for Outstanding Achievement in the History of Chemistry by the ACS in 2004. He has been the author of fifteen books and over 400 publications in scientific journals. His book Traces of the Past was a selection of the Natural Science Book Club. He was the founder of the Journal of Physical Organic Chemistry and served as editor-in-chief for 23 years. He is past chairman of the ACS Subdivision of Archaeological Chemistry, past president of the Society of Archaeological Sciences, past chairman of his department, and past chairman of the ACS Division of the History of Chemistry. A strong advocate of the combination of research and teaching, he has won a number of teaching awards, including the James Flack Norris Award of the American Chemical Society (1987), the E. Leroy Hall Award of the College of Arts and Sciences of Northwestern University (1991), the National Catalyst Award of the Chemical Manufacturers Association (1993), and the Northwestern University Alumni Award (1994). From 1999 to 2002 he was Charles Deering McCormick Professor of Teaching Excellence at Northwestern. His major scientific contributions include the creation of the first silyl cation (the silicon analogue of the carbocation), elucidation of the mechanism of beta-silyl stabilization of carbocations, discovery of inductive enhancement of solvolytic participation, creation of new methods of conformational analysis by nuclear magnetic resonance spectroscopy (the R value), understanding the conformations of cyclic molecules containing heteroatoms, and development of chemical methods to examine archaeological materials.

== Trinity University (2010-present) ==
Since retiring from Northwestern in 2010, Lambert has continued his research at Trinity University in San Antonio, Texas. His research with Trinity undergraduates has focused on understanding the variety of molecular structures of the gemstone amber from sources around the world. In 2025 he published his four-volume, 2472-page genealogy of his ancestors and those of his wife, Mary Wakefield Pulliam Lambert, the culmination of over 60 years of family research.

== Books ==
Five Hundred Years of Family: Ancestors of our Lambert, Kirwan, Pulliam/McGlasson, and Cannon Parents (four volumes), Brigham Young University Press, 2025
Nuclear Magnetic Resonance: An Introduction to Principles, Applications, and Experimental Methods, second edition, Wiley, 2019; Chinese transl., 2021
A Chemical Life, De Rigueur Press, 2014
Organic Structural Spectroscopy, second edition, Pearson, 2011; German transl, 2012; Korean transl., 2013
Nuclear Magnetic Resonance: An Introduction to Principles, Applications, and Experimental Methods, Prentice Hall, 2004
Organic Structural Spectroscopy, Prentice Hall, 1998
Traces of the Past: Unraveling the Secrets of Archaeology through Chemistry, Addison-Wesley/Perseus, 1997
Prehistoric Human Bone: Archaeology at the Molecular Level, Springer-Verlag, 1993
Acyclic Organonitrogen Stereodynamics, VCH, 1992
Cyclic Organonitrogen Stereodynamics, VCH, 1992
Recent Progress in Organic NMR Spectroscopy, UNICAMP Press (Brazil) and Norell Press (USA), 1987
Introduction to Organic Spectroscopy, Macmillan, 1987
Archaeological Chemistry III, American Chemical Society, 1984
The Multinuclear Approach to NMR Spectroscopy, D. Reidel, 1983
Physical Organic Chemistry through Solved Problems, Holden Day, 1978; Chinese transl., 1988
Organic Structural Analysis, Macmillan, 1976; Japanese transl., 1979

== Personal ==
Lambert has been married since 1967 to Mary Wakefield Pulliam Lambert, who received a PhD from Northwestern University in 1970 and was a research associate from 1981 to 2009 at the same institution. He has 3 children and 4 grandchildren and currently resides in San Antonio, Texas.
