= William Gould Young =

American physical organic chemist (1902–1980)

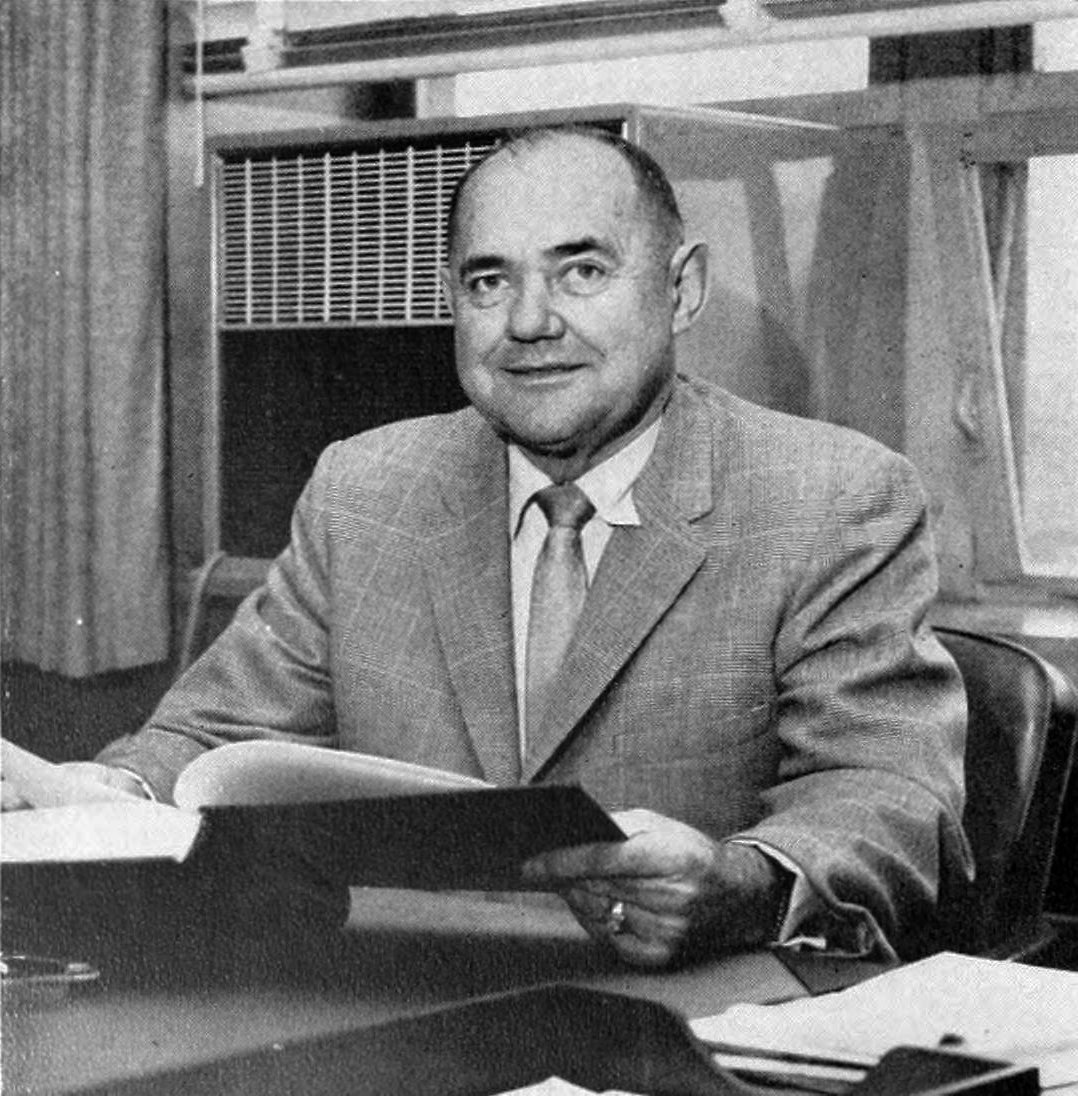
- Young in 1960
- Born: July 30, 1902
- Died: July 5, 1980 (aged 77)
- Other name: Bill Young
- Scientific career
- Fields: Organic chemistry
- Doctoral students: John D. Roberts

William Gould Young (July 30, 1902 – July 5, 1980) was an American physical organic chemist and professor at the University of California at Los Angeles (UCLA). He served as vice chancellor at UCLA for 13 years, was elected to the National Academy of Sciences. The chemistry building at UCLA bears his name.

== Education ==
Young was born in Colorado Springs, Colorado, and attended Colorado College, graduating with a BA in 1924 and a master's degree in 1925. He worked with H.A. Spoehr at the Carnegie Institution for Science before enrolling at the California Institute of Technology to pursue his doctorate in physical organic chemistry under the direction of Howard J. Lucas. Young served as a National Research Council postdoctoral scholar at Stanford University for one year, before joining the faculty at UCLA, where he would remain for his entire career (through 1970).

== Career ==
=== Research ===
Young's research interests centered on molecular rearrangements of allyl groups, including higher-order allyl groups such as crotyl, prenyl, and various allyl organometallic reagents. In a series of over 30 subsequent publications, Young examined rate constants, substitution preference, stereochemistry, and alternate reaction sites of allyl transfers. He also collaborated with student groups to develop glassware and lab tools, for instance the ubiquitous glass helices found in fractionation columns used to separate isomeric volatiles.

Perhaps Young's longest legacy – apart from his 130 research publications – was serving as the doctoral advisor to chemist and nuclear magnetic resonance pioneer John D. Roberts.

=== Administration ===
Young was appointed dean of physical sciences at UCLA in 1948, serving in this capacity until 1957. He was named vice chancellor for Planning from 1957 until his retirement in 1970.

=== Pedagogy ===
Young was revered as a master educator and mentor. He devoted his entire Priestley Medal address to issues of chemical education, given increasing pressures from post-World War II research enterprise expansion, increased student enrollment in the sciences, and the rapid adoption of newer analytical instrumentation – NMR, mass spectrometry, HPLC, infrared spectroscopy, among others – into undergraduate curricula. He pointed out the inherent paradox in his "crossroads" analogy: as technology enabled deeper study of quantitative chemical data, it also called for reducing hours spent in chemistry so candidates could broaden their study into related fields such as botany, zoology, or molecular biology.

== Personal life ==
At 24, Bill Young married Helen Graybeal; they would remain married until his death in 1980. Their interests, according to Young's memorial, included golf, travel, and UCLA athletics games.

== Awards and honors ==
- 1970 – Renaming of UCLA chemistry building as "Young Hall"
- 1968 – Priestley Medal, American Chemical Society
- 1964 – UCLA Distinguished Service Medal
- 1962 – George C. Pimentel Chemical Education Award, ACS
- 1961 – Tolman Medal, Southern California section of the ACS
- 1951 – First faculty member at UCLA elected to the National Academy of Sciences
- 1949 – Chair of the Division of Organic Chemistry, ACS

According to the memorial written to Young by his colleagues on the UCLA Chemistry oral history, he received honorary degrees [LLD or DS] from Colorado College, University of Colorado Boulder, University of the Pacific (United States), and UCLA.
