= Marjorie Caserio =

American chemist (1929–2021)

Marjorie Constance Caserio
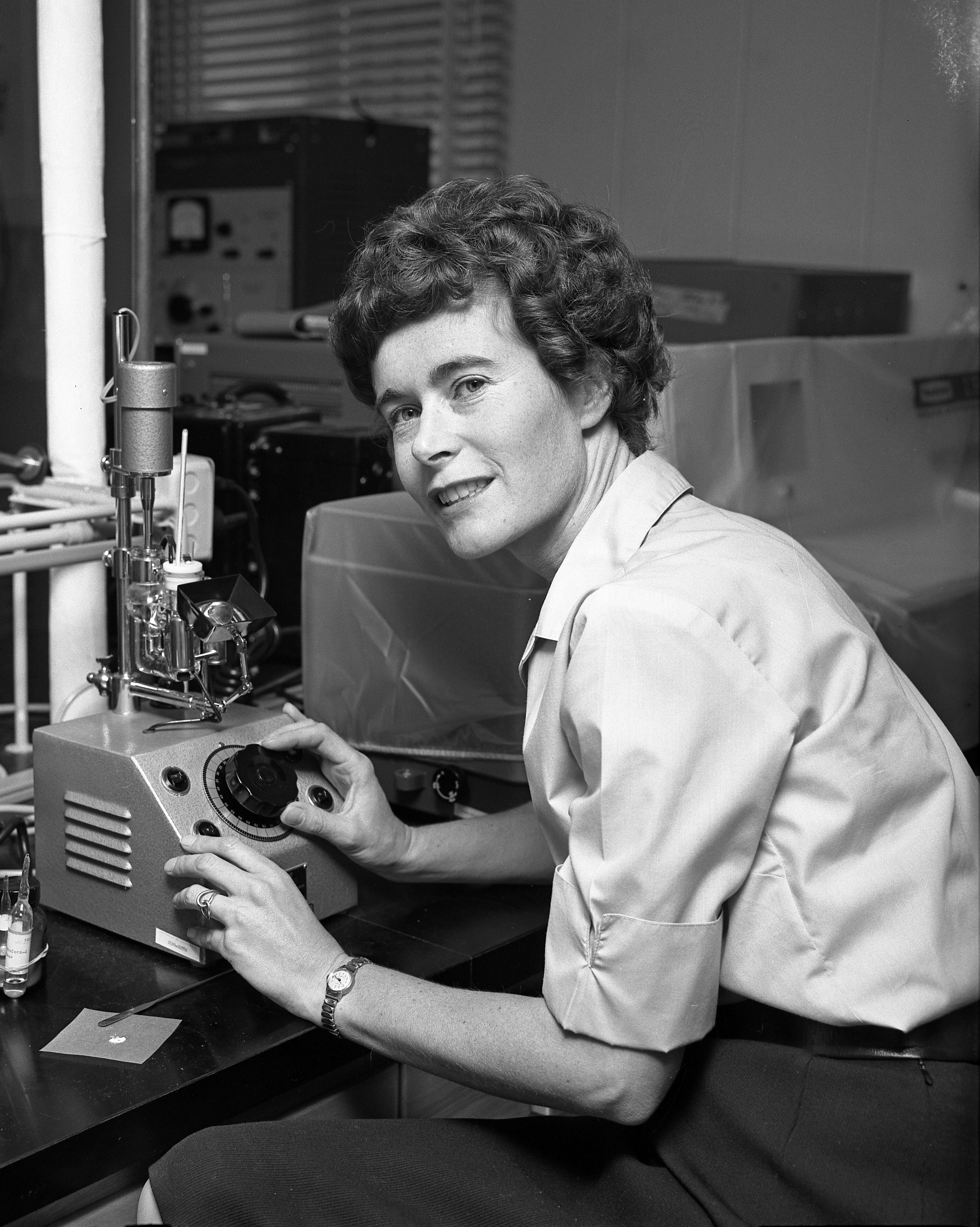
- Caserio in 1965
- Born: Marjorie Constance Beckett; February 26, 1929; Cricklewood, London, England
- Died: April 19, 2021 (aged 92); Mexico
- Education: Chelsea College of Art and Design; Bryn Mawr College
- Known for: Basic Principles of Organic Chemistry
- Spouse: Fred Caserio (m. 1957)
- Children: 2
- Awards: Garvan Medal
- Scientific career
- Fields: Chemistry
- Institutions: University of California, Irvine, University of California, San Diego
- Theses: "The alkaline hydrolysis of ethyl p-alkybenzoates." (M.A., 1951); "The kinetics of bromination of naphthalene" (Ph.D., 1956)

Marjorie Constance Caserio (née Beckett; February 26, 1929 – April 19, 2021) was an English chemist. In 1975, she was awarded the Garvan Medal by the American Chemical Society.

== Early life and education ==
Caserio was born Marjorie Constance Beckett in Cricklewood, London, England. She attended the North London Collegiate School and began studying podiatry at Chelsea College, but soon developed a preference for chemistry and graduated with honors in the subject in 1950. She was awarded a Sir John Dill Fellowship by the English-Speaking Union which allowed her to study at Bryn Mawr College in the United States, she earned an M.A. in chemistry in 1951. Her thesis was entitled "The alkaline hydrolysis of ethyl p-alkybenzoates."

For a year she worked at the Fulmer Research Institute in rural Stoke Poges, England, researching the effects of fluorides on titanium, but disliked the work and decided to seek a Ph.D. in chemistry. She interviewed with Nobel laureate Derek Barton and was accepted to Birkbeck College in London, but was not offered financial aid. Instead, Caserio returned to Bryn Mawr in the U.S., earning her Ph.D. in 1956 with a dissertation entitled "The kinetics of bromination of naphthalene."

== Career ==
Caserio was hired by John D. Roberts for a postdoctoral position at the California Institute of Technology. She spent eight years at Caltech, working on 3- and 4-membered ring compounds, the reactions of alcohols with diazomethane, the hydrolysis of diaryliodonium salts, the deamination of nitrous acid, and benzyne reaction intermediates in nucleophilic aromatic substitution reactions.

She collaborated with Roberts in writing an organic chemistry textbook, Basic Principles of Organic Chemistry, first published in 1964. Notable for its comprehensiveness and then-unusual emphasis on spectroscopy, it proved enormously influential in how the subject was taught. Also working with Roberts was chemist Fred Caserio.

=== University of California, Irvine ===
In 1964, Caserio was hired as the second faculty member in chemistry at the brand new University of California, Irvine. At UC Irvine she worked on addition reactions in allenes and bonding and reactions of sulfur compounds. She was one of the first scientists to employ nuclear magnetic resonance spectroscopy to study the kinetics and mechanisms of these organic reactions, and ion cyclotron resonance to study gas-phase reactions. Caserio became a full professor at UC Irvine in 1972, and chair of the chemistry department in 1987.

=== University of California, San Diego ===
In 1990, she became vice chancellor for academic affairs at the University of California, San Diego. She later served as interim chancellor, and retired in 1996.

== Personal life and death ==
In 1957, she married Fred Caserio; she became a US citizen the same year. They had two sons. She died in 2021, aged 92, on a trip to Mexico.

== Books ==
- John D. Roberts; Marjorie C. Caserio (1977). Basic Principles of Organic Chemistry (2nd ed.). W. A. Benjamin. ISBN 0805383298.
- John D. Roberts; Ross Stewart; Marjorie C. Caserio (1971). Organic Chemistry: Methane to Macromolecules. W. A. Benjamin. ISBN 0805383328.
