= Vineet Soni =

Professor

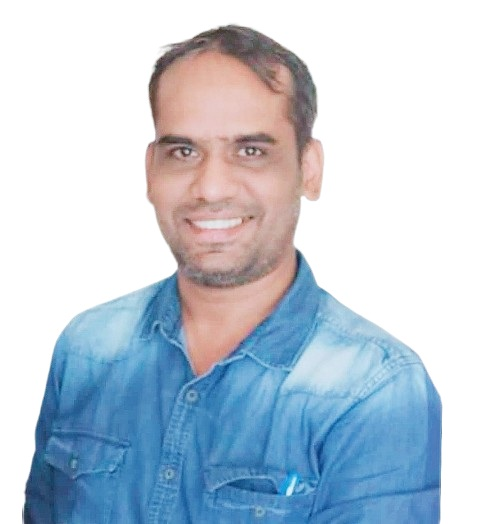
- Born: Udaipur, India
- Education: Maharaja College, Jaipur, University of Rajasthan, India, University of Geneva, Switzerland
- Known for: 'Discovery of maternal care in plants' and research in plant photosynthesis
- Scientific career
- Fields: Plant Biochemistry, Conservation biology, Photosynthesis
- Institutions: Mohanlal Sukhadia University, Udaipur
- Academic advisors: Professor P.L. Swarnkar, Professor Reto J. Strasser

Vineet Soni, the son of botanist Professor P.L. Swarnkar, is an Indian plant physiologist, biotechnologist and social activist. He has made contributions in plant bioenergetics and is the elected Fellows of the Royal Society of Biology and the Linnean Society of London. He is known for the discovery of maternal care in plants. Dr. Soni is also the founder of the "Save Guggul Movement", a community-based conservation effort to conserve threatened plant species, particularly guggul. Presently, he is the Head at the Department of Botany, Mohanlal Sukhadia University, Udaipur.

== Education and professional career ==
Vineet was born on 20 January 1979 and specializes in plant physiology, conservation biology, and photosynthesis research. He received bachelor's (1996–99) from Maharaja College, Jaipur and master's degree (2000-2001) in Botany from the University of Rajasthan, Jaipur. He then joined the Birla Institute of Scientific Research and University of Rajasthan for doctoral research (PhD) work on various aspects of biotechnology and physiology of Commiphora wightii. In 2004, Soni received visiting fellowship to work on plant bioenergetics at University of Geneva, Switzerland. Through the Bio-Rad fellowship, he visited European Molecular Biology Laboratory at Heidelberg, Germany in 2005. Thereafter in 2006, Soni received prestigious award from Nature Publishing Group to present his research work at Gordon Conference at Boston, USA.

After receiving PhD degree, Soni worked as Post-Doctoral research fellow with Professor Reto J. Strasser at University of Geneva, Switzerland. In 2010, UNESCO, France published his special interview entitled 'Why Vineet Soni is bent on saving the guggul plants?' in 'A World of Science' journal. In 2011, he served as a visiting scientist at the Commissariat à l'énergie atomique et aux énergies alternatives, France.

== Contribution in Plant Bioenergetics ==
Dr. Vineet Soni was trained in plant bioenergetics research at the University of Geneva, Switzerland under the supervision of Prof. Reto. J. Strasser, who is considered worldwide as 'Father of Plant Bioenergetics'. After completing Post-doctoral research, Dr. Soni returned back to India and extensively worked to educate Indian plant biologists about various tools and techniques used in plant bioenergetics. His research group published several research papers dealing with chlorophyll fluorescence, OJIP kinetics and photosynthetic modulations under environmental stresses in journals of reputes such as Nature Research-Scientific Reports, Physiologia Plantarum, Conservation Evidence, South African Journal of Botany, Biochemical and Biophysical Research Communications etc. and has been honored with Scientist of the Year Award, Outstanding Scientist Award, Nature Publishing Group Award, Bio-Rad Award, Innovation in Teaching Award, Earth Mover Award etc. Recently in 2024, he was elected as Fellow of the Royal Society of Biology. He is also a member of three International Union for Conservation of Nature commissions: the Species Survival Commission, the World Commission for Protected Areas, and the Commission on Education and Communication and elected fellow of many prestigious societies i.e. the Academy of Plant Sciences of India, Mendelian Society of India, Indian Botanical Society, Indian Council for Plant Conservation and Linnean Society of London.

== Save Guggul Movement ==
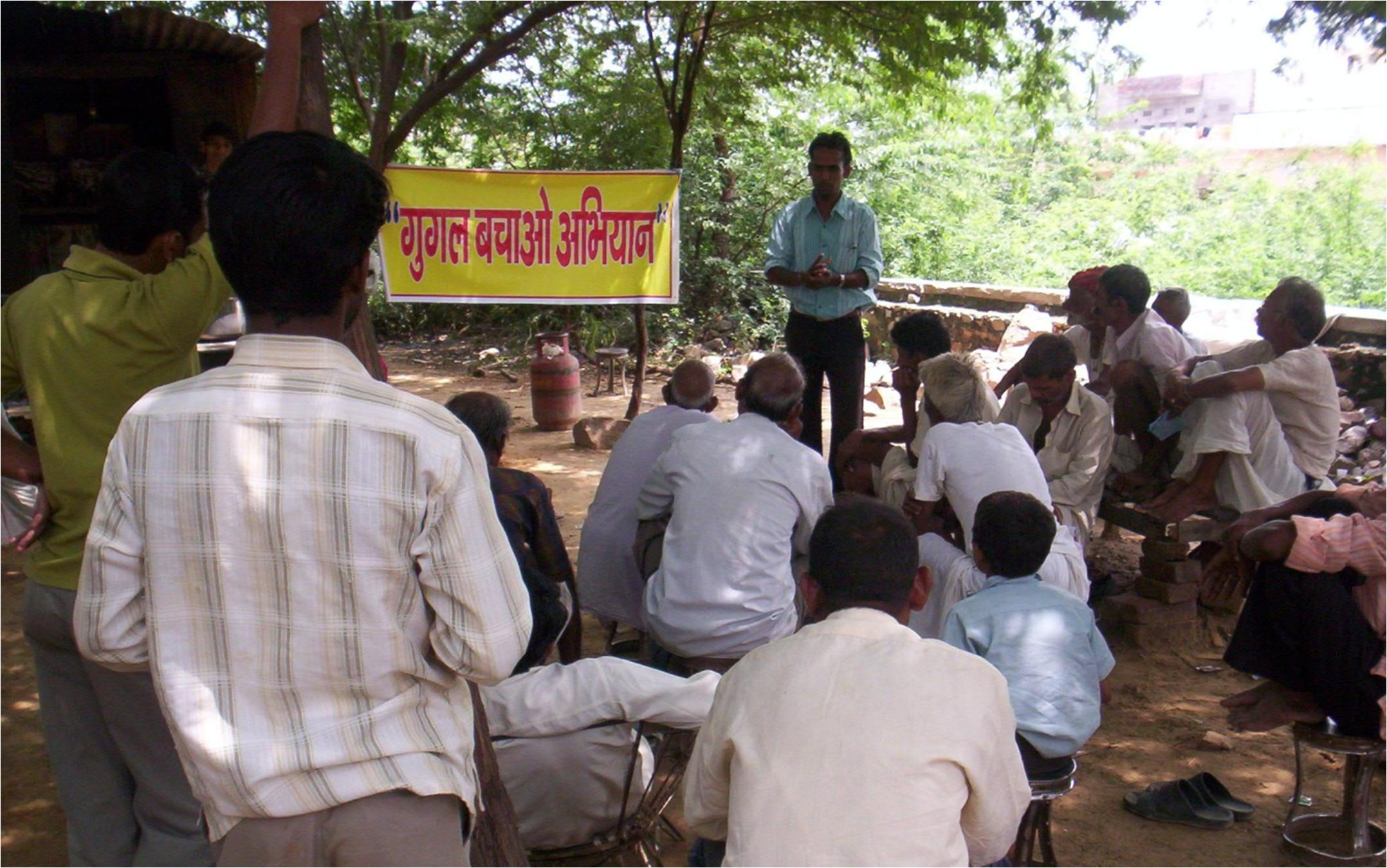
'Save Guggul Movement' in Rajasthan, India

Dr. Soni started the Save Guggul Movement in 2007 to conserve the critically threatened plant species guggul. His conservation efforts were well received by local villagers and conservation communities from all over the world. Soni was profiled as one of 20 global "Earth Movers" by IUCN. and recently honored by the Environmentalists of the Year Award by the National Environmental Science Academy. Initially his conservation work received financial support from the IUCN Sir Peter Scott Fund.

== Discovery of maternal care in plants ==
Dr. Vineet is the first to discover and provide experimental evidence of maternal care in plants. His research established the existence of maternal care in the plant kingdom by demonstrating that mother plants provide prolonged physiological and resource support to their offspring during establishment and under environmental stress until they become fully independent.

== Suicide Prevention Movement ==
In order to prevent the suicide cases among the NEET aspirants at the Kota district (Rajasthan), Dr. Vineet started the Suicide Prevention Movement through the online counseling.
