= Dinshaw Patel =

Indian-American structural biologist

Dinshaw J. Patel
- Born: Mumbai, India
- Education: University of Mumbai; California Institute of Technology; New York University
- Scientific career
- Fields: Structural biology
- Workplaces: Bell Labs; Columbia University Medical Center; Memorial Sloan Kettering Cancer Center
- Doctoral advisor: David Israel Schuster

Dinshaw J. Patel is an Indian-American structural biologist who holds the Abby Rockefeller Mauzé Chair in Experimental Therapeutics at Memorial Sloan Kettering Cancer Center in New York City.

== Early life and education ==
Patel was born in 1942 in Mumbai, India and was raised in the Zoroastrian tradition. He received his bachelor's degree in chemistry from the University of Mumbai in 1961 and then moved to the United States for graduate school, completing a master's degree at the California Institute of Technology in 1963. He later recalled this experience, working in the laboratory of John D. Roberts, as his first exposure to NMR spectroscopy, a technique that would become a key part of his research program. Patel then joined the laboratory of David Schuster at New York University, from which he received his Ph.D. in chemistry in 1968.

After completing his Ph.D., Patel became interested in moving from chemistry to biology and worked as a postdoctoral fellow with Robert Chambers at NYU. He then moved to Bell Labs in New Jersey, first as a postdoctoral researcher and later in a permanent position in polymer chemistry. He remained at Bell Labs for almost 17 years, primarily using NMR to study biological polymers.

== Academic career ==
In 1984 Patel moved from Bell Labs back to academia and became a professor of biochemistry and molecular biophysics at Columbia University Medical Center, where his research group focused on using NMR to study double-stranded DNA structures. He was recruited by Paul Marks at Memorial Sloan Kettering Cancer Center to move his laboratory and work to develop the institution's new program in structural biology, alongside colleague James Rothman. Following the move in 1992, Patel expanded his research interests into X-ray crystallography and RNA structure. Patel was elected to the National Academy of Sciences in 2009 and to the American Academy of Arts and Sciences in 2014.

== Research interests ==
Patel's research focuses on structural biology of nucleic acids and has been particularly impactful in the study of RNA structure and protein-RNA interaction mechanisms. Patel's research group has studied riboswitches and ribozymes, as well as nuclease proteins involved in RNA interference processes. More recently his group has focused on the structural biology of epigenetic regulation, examining the mechanisms through which chemical modifications of DNA and histone proteins exert regulatory effects. The group also uses structural techniques to study innate immunity and lipid binding proteins.

== Publications ==
- List of publications with Patel as author or co-author. scholar.google.com.
