= David Israel Schuster =

- Born: Brooklyn, New York
- Education: Columbia University; California Institute of Technology
- Scientific career
- Fields: Photochemistry
- Workplaces: New York University
- Doctoral advisor: John D. Roberts

David Israel Schuster is a chemist who is currently a professor emeritus at New York University. His research program focused on organic photochemistry and later on fullerenes.

== Early life and education ==
Schuster was born in Brooklyn, New York in 1935 and raised in Far Rockaway. He attended Columbia University as an undergraduate and received his bachelor's degree in chemistry in 1956. He then moved to the California Institute of Technology, from which he received his Ph.D. in 1961 under the mentorship of John D. Roberts. During Schuster's time in the Roberts laboratory, the group began experimenting with some of the first applications of NMR spectroscopy to organic chemistry. Schuster next joined Howard Zimmerman's group at the University of Wisconsin as a postdoctoral fellow, where he spent a year studying mechanistic organic photochemistry.

== Academic career ==
Schuster was recruited to New York University by Kurt Mislow, who was also interested in photochemistry, and joined the faculty there in late 1961 in what was at the time the University Heights, Bronx campus. He remained at NYU for his entire academic career. Schuster received tenure in 1968 and spent the 1968–69 academic year on sabbatical in London in the laboratory of George Porter. In 1974 NYU closed its Bronx campus, requiring Schuster to move his laboratory to the Manhattan campus near Washington Square Park. Among Schuster's influential advisees are structural biologist Dinshaw Patel and synthetic organic chemist Phil Baran, who worked in the laboratory as an NYU undergraduate. Schuster closed his laboratory and retired, assuming professor emeritus status, in 2010.

Schuster was elected a fellow of the American Association for the Advancement of Science in 1992 and received the Arthur C. Cope Scholar Award, given by the American Chemical Society, in 2012.

== Personal life ==
Schuster married his wife Carlotta, a psychiatrist, in 1962. He is a lifelong classical music enthusiast and serious pianist.
