= John D. Roberts =

American chemist (1918–2016)

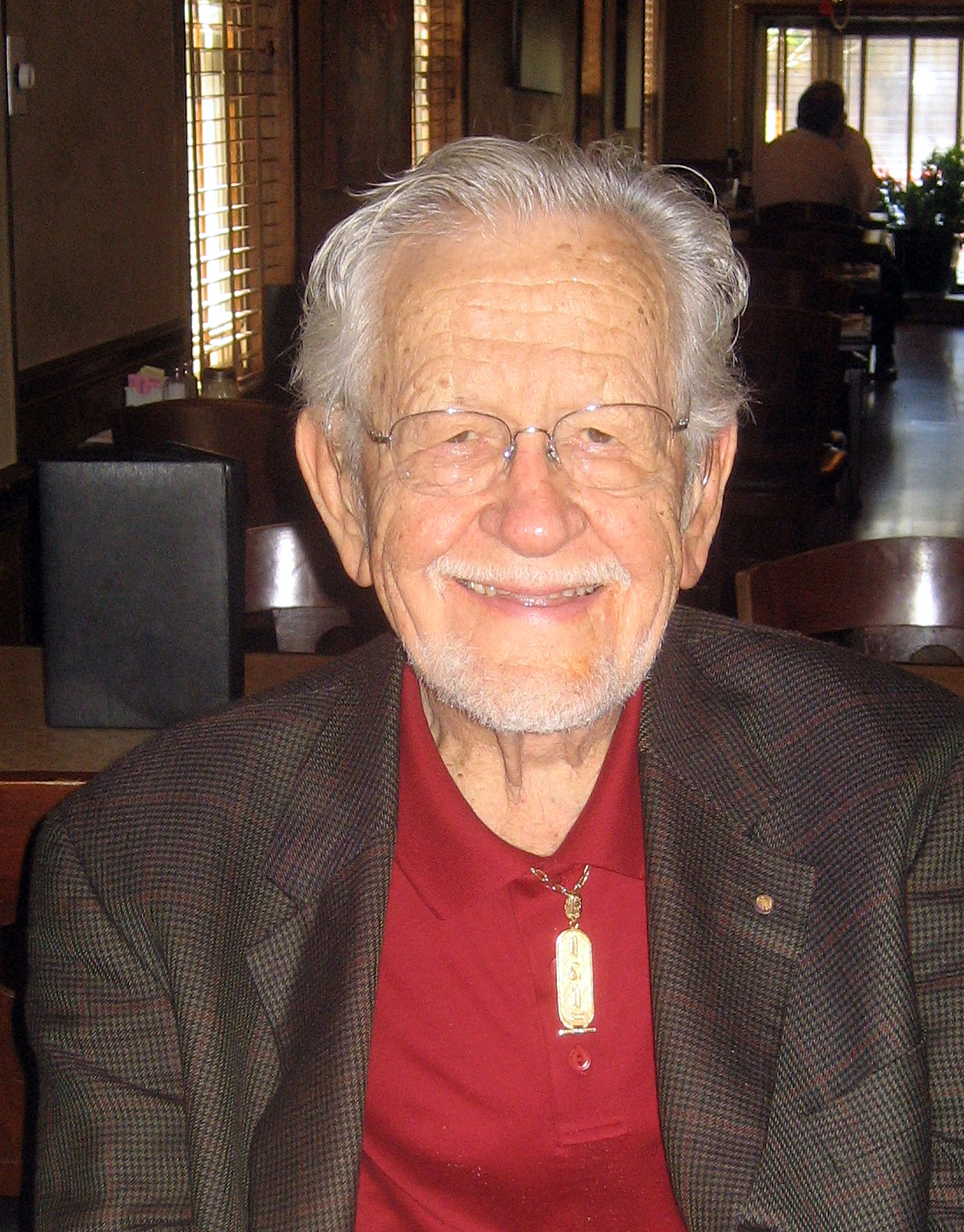
- John D. Roberts in 2010
- Born: John Dombrowski Roberts; June 8, 1918; Los Angeles, California, U.S.
- Died: October 29, 2016 (aged 98); Pasadena, California, U.S.
- Education: UCLA
- Awards: ACS Award in Pure Chemistry (1954); Roger Adams Award in Organic Chemistry (1967); William H. Nichols Medal (1972); Tolman Award (1974); Willard Gibbs Award (1983); Priestley Medal (1987); Welch Award (1990); National Medal of Science (1990); Glenn T. Seaborg Medal (1991); Arthur C. Cope Award (1994); Nakanishi Prize (2001); Linus Pauling Legacy Award (2006); American Institute of Chemists Gold Medal (2013)
- Scientific career
- Fields: Chemistry
- Workplaces: Penn State; UCLA; Harvard; MIT; Caltech
- Thesis: Studies of the nature of the butenyl Grignard reagent (1945)
- Doctoral advisors: William Gould Young
- Doctoral students: Joseph B. Lambert; David Israel Schuster; Dorothy Semenow; Howard E. Simmons; George M. Whitesides
- Other notable students: Post-docs: William Bachovchin; Marjorie Constance Caserio; Donald J. Cram; Sukh Dev; Andrew Streitwieser; Undergrad: Jesse L. Beauchamp; MS student: Dinshaw Patel

John Dombrowski Roberts (June 8, 1918 – October 29, 2016) was an American chemist. He made contributions to the integration of physical chemistry, spectroscopy, and organic chemistry for the understanding of chemical reaction rates. Another characteristic of Roberts' work was the early use of NMR, focusing on the concept of spin coupling.

== Career ==
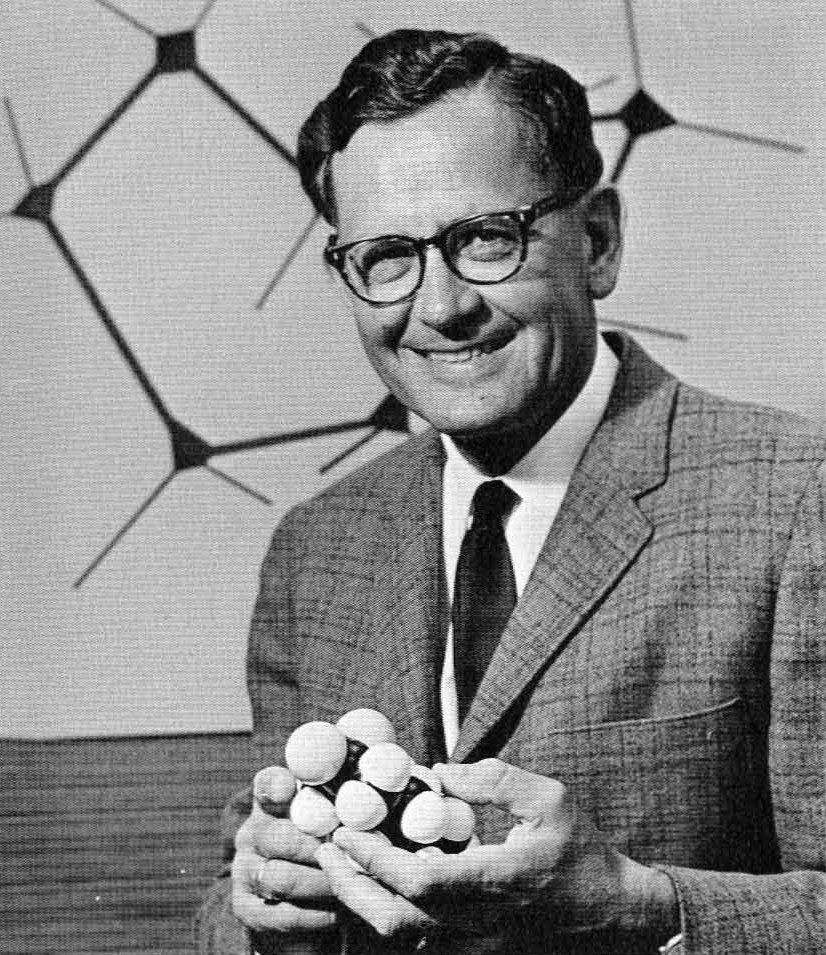
Roberts in 1967

Roberts received both a B.A. (1941) and Ph.D. (1944) from the University of California, Los Angeles, working under Professor William Gould Young. He held several positions at the California Institute of Technology, including division chairman of chemistry and chemical engineering from 1963 to 1968, dean of the faculty and provost from 1980 to 1983 and Institute Professor of chemistry, emeritus (1988–2016) in the Division of Chemistry and Chemical Engineering. He is credited with bringing the first female graduate student, Dorothy Semenow, to Caltech when he moved from MIT. He was a consultant for DuPont Central Research (1950–2008) and for Oak Ridge.

He published his autobiography in 1990, The Right Place at the Right Time. Roberts died on October 29, 2016, at the age of 98 from a stroke.

== Awards and honors ==
Roberts was elected a Member of the American Academy of Arts and Sciences in 1952. He was elected Member of the National Academy of Sciences in 1956 at 38 years old. He was elected to the American Philosophical Society in 1974. In 1978, he was elected a Fellow of The Explorers Club. In 1984, Roberts received the Golden Plate Award of the American Academy of Achievement, awarded the Priestley Medal in 1987, the National Medal of Science in 1990, the Glenn T. Seaborg Medal in 1991, the NAS Award in Chemical Sciences in 1999, the Nakanishi Prize in 2001, the NAS Award for Chemistry in Service to Society in 2009, the Linus Pauling Legacy Award in 2006 and the American Institute of Chemists Gold Medal in 2013.

Roberts received honorary degrees from LMU Munich (1962), Temple University (1964), and the University of Notre Dame.

In 1998, he was named by Chemical & Engineering News as one of the 75 most influential chemists of the last 75 years.

== Sources ==
- Roberts, John D. (2000). ABCs of FT-NMR. Sausalito, California: University Science Books. ISBN 9781938787386. OCLC 44841582.
- "JDR". Engineering & Science. Vol. 44, no. 2. 1980. pp. 10–14.

== Books ==
- Roberts, John D.; Caserio, Marjorie C. (1977). Basic Principles of Organic Chemistry (2nd ed.). W. A. Benjamin. ISBN 0-8053-8329-8. OCLC 680417561. (Alternate link to official Caltech repository for book)
- Roberts, John D.; Caserio, Marjorie C. (1977). A study guide to Basic principles of organic chemistry (2nd ed.). W. A. Benjamin. ISBN 0-8053-8327-1. OCLC 1151339528.
- Roberts, John D. (1961). An Introduction to the Analysis of Spin-Spin Splitting in High-Resolution Nuclear Magnetic Resonance Spectra. W. A. Benjamin. OCLC 1376898494.
- Roberts, John D. (1961). Notes on Molecular Orbital Calculations. W. A. Benjamin. OCLC 543389.
- Roberts, John D. (1959). Nuclear Magnetic Resonance: Applications to Organic Chemistry. McGraw-Hill Book Company. OCLC 1007467303.
- Roberts, John D.; Stewart, Ross; Caserio, Marjorie C. (1971). Organic Chemistry: Methane to Macromolecules. W. A. Benjamin. ISBN 978-0805383324. OCLC 1376898705. (Alternate link to official Caltech repository for book)
