= 16-Dehydropregnenolone acetate =

Chemical compound

Names
- IUPAC name 20-Oxopregna-5,16-dien-3β-yl acetate
- Systematic IUPAC name (3aS,3bR,7S,9aR,9bS,11aS)-1-Acetyl-9a,11a-dimethyl-3a,3b,4,6,7,8,9,9a,9b,10,11,11a-dodecahydro-3H-cyclopenta[a]phenanthren-7-yl acetate
- Other names 16-DPA; 5,16-Pregnadien-3β-ol-20-one acetate; 3β-Hydroxy-5,16-pregnadien-20-one acetate; 3β-Acetoxy-5,16-pregnadien-20-one

Identifiers
| CAS Number | 979-02-2 |
| ChEBI | CHEBI:34163 |
| ChEMBL | ChEMBL1761683 |
| ChemSpider | 83823 |
| ECHA InfoCard | 100.012.326 |
| EC Number | 213-558-7 |
| KEGG | C14503 |
| PubChem CID | 92855 |
| UNII | 832VMW7ZGC |
| CompTox Dashboard (EPA) | DTXSID8057857 |
- InChI: InChI=1S/C23H32O3/c1-14(24)19-7-8-20-18-6-5-16-13-17(26-15(2)25)9-11-22(16,3)21(18)10-12-23(19,20)4/h5,7,17-18,20-21H,6,8-13H2,1-4H3/t17-,18-,20-,21-,22-,23+/m0/s1 Key: MZWRIOUCMXPLKV-VMNVZBNLSA-N

Properties
| Chemical formula | C_{23}H_{32}O_{3} |
| Molar mass | 356.506 g·mol^{−1} |
| Appearance | White crystalline powder |
| Melting point | 171–172 °C (340–342 °F; 444–445 K) |
- Except where otherwise noted, data are given for materials in their standard state (at 25 °C [77 °F], 100 kPa). Infobox references

16-Dehydropregnenolone acetate (16-DPA) is a chemical compound used as an intermediate or synthon in the production of many semisynthetic steroids. While it is not easy to synthesize, it is a convenient intermediate which can be made from other more available materials, and which can then be modified to produce the desired target compound.

== Upstream sources ==
16-DPA can be produced from a variety of steroidal sapogenins. Industrially useful sources are diosgenin in Mexican yams and solasodine from certain nightshades. These two sapogenins can be used in a one-pot synthesis. Solanidine in potato greens, an alkaloid sapogenin, is also a key source material.

== Downstream products ==
Compounds derived from 16-DPA include:

- Corticosteroids (mainly of a C22 pregnane backbone): hydrocortisone*, betamethasone*, dexamethasone*, beclometasone*, fluticasone, and prednicarbate;
- Progestogen (mainly of a C22 pregnane backbone): pregnenolone, progesterone*, various synthetic derivatives such as medroxyprogesterone acetate* and levonorgestrel*;
- Androgens (mainly of a C19 androstane, 17-keto backbone): testosterone* and esters, various synthetic derivatives;
- Estrogens (mainly of a C18 estrane, 17-hydroxy backbone): estradiol and esters such as estradiol cypionate*, various synthetic derivatives such as ethinylestradiol*.
- Guggulsterone
- DHEA
- Pregnenolone 16α-carbonitrile
- Mecigestone

Those marked with a * appear on the WHO Model List of Essential Medicines, some as part of a compound medication. The list is by no means complete due to the central role of 16-DPA in steroid production.

== Pharmacology ==
There are no current medical uses of 16-DPA. Studies in male hamsters show that the related chemical 16-DHP acts as an farnesoid X receptor (FXR) antagonist, consequently up-regulating CYP7A1 and lowering serum cholesterol. The CSIR-CDRI holds a patent over 16-DHP for prospective lipid-lowering use.

== History ==
Production of substantial quantities of steroids was not achieved until the Marker degradation in the late 1930s, a synthesis route converting diosgenin into the related compound 16-dehydropregnenolone (16-DP or 16-DHP). This reaction established Mexico as a world center of steroid production. 16-DPA was produced in a variant of Marker degradation published in 1940.

The earliest PubChem patent record for 16-DPA is US2656364A of 1951, describing its conversion into 17-ketosteroids.

== Synthesis ==
Lednicer covers the synthesis of 16-DPA in his book of steroids. It is produced by the Marker degradation of diosgenin (which itself is a product from the hydrolysis of glycoside saponin called dioscin). There is a large bevy of 16-DPA syntheses reported in the literature and patents (too many to record here). Notable ones that are creditworthy of mention include a one-pot synthesis and a green method.

Also worth mentioning is that in addition to the Marker degradation of diosgenin, it is also possible to make 16-DPA from Solasodine and Solanidine (q.v.). These derived from nightshade alkaloids and not Mexican yams.

== See also ==
- Mexican barbasco trade
