= Guggulsterone =

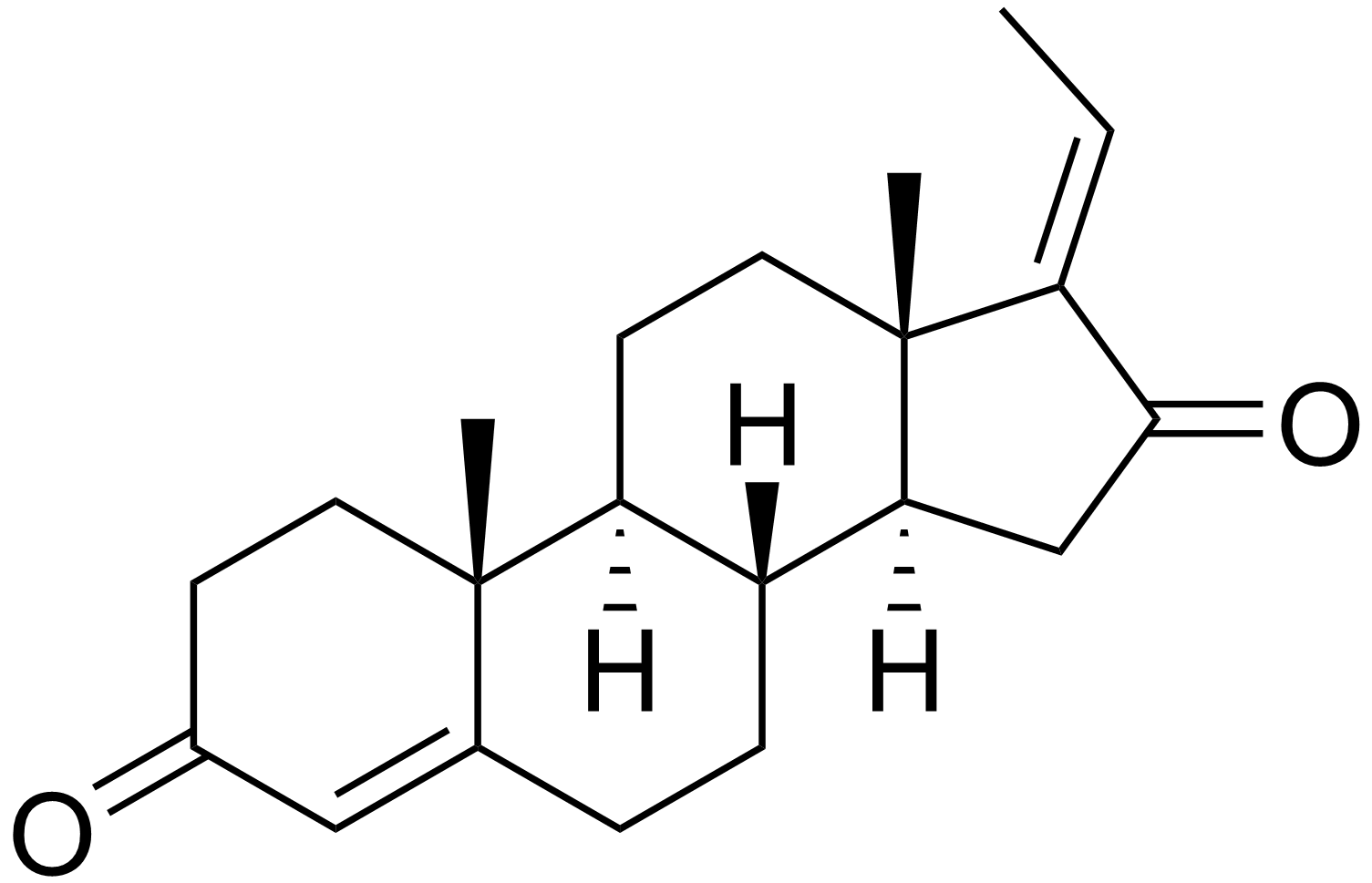
- E-Guggulsterone

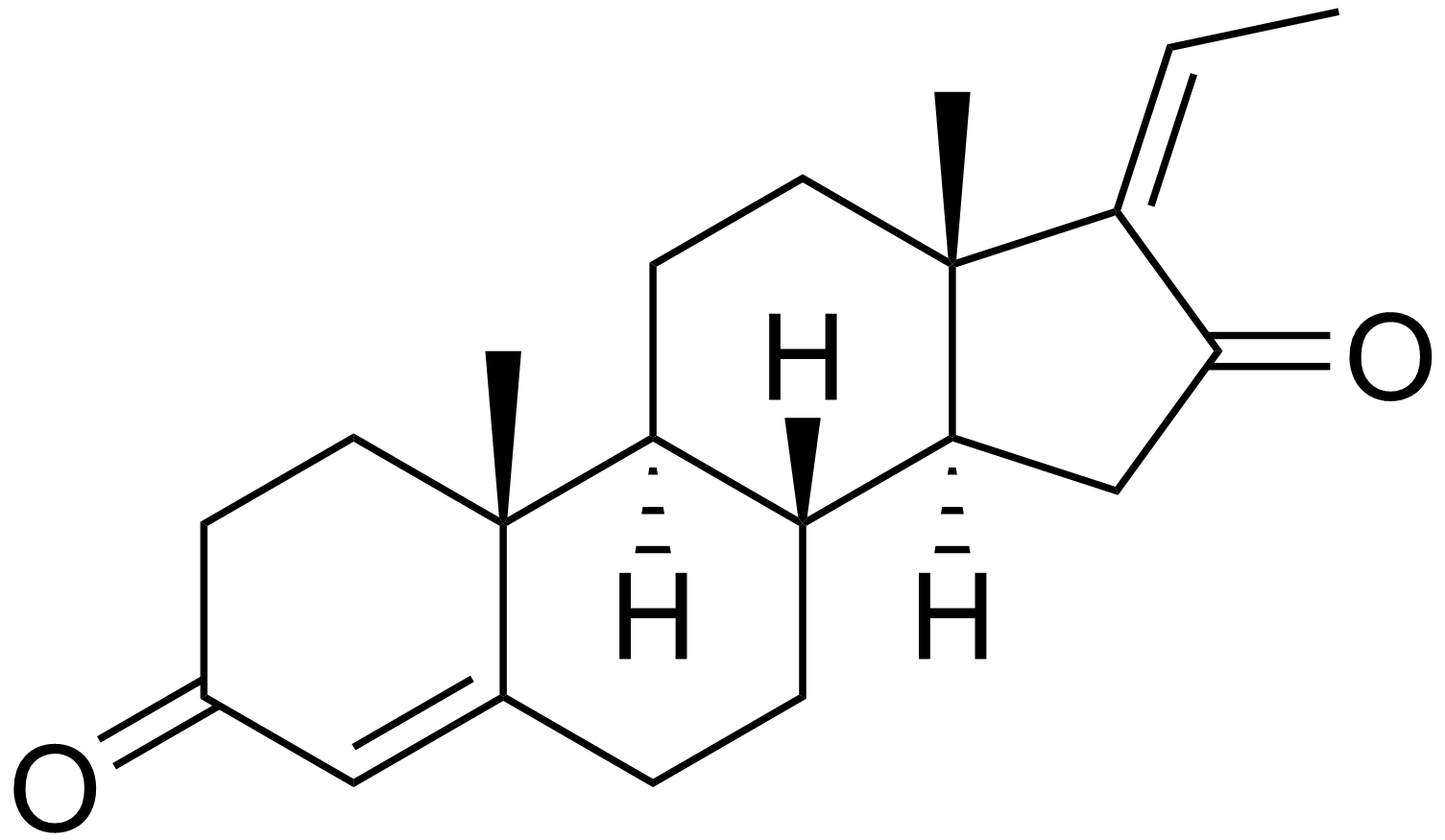
- Z-Guggulsterone

Names
- IUPAC name (8R,9S,10R,13S,14S)-17-Ethylidene-10,13-dimethyl-1,2,6,7,8,9,11,12,14,15-decahydrocyclopenta[a]phenanthrene-3,16-dione
- Other names Pregna-4,17-diene-3,16-dione

Identifiers
CAS Number	95975-55-6; 39025-24-6 (E); 39025-23-5 (Z)
3D model (JSmol)	(E): Interactive image; (Z): Interactive image
ChEMBL	ChEMBL410683
ChemSpider	4944297 (E); 4952892 (Z)
ECHA InfoCard	100.118.937
IUPHAR/BPS	2745
PubChem CID	6439929 (E); 6450278 (Z)
UNII	A4PW148END; 9B259YE66O (E); 6CST3U34GN (Z)
CompTox Dashboard (EPA)	DTXSID6033538
- InChI: (E): InChI=1S/C21H28O2/c1-4-16-19(23)12-18-15-6-5-13-11-14(22)7-9-20(13,2)17(15)8-10-21(16,18)3/h4,11,15,17-18H,5-10,12H2,1-3H3/b16-4-/t15-,17+,18+,20+,21-/m1/s1 Key: WDXRGPWQVHZTQJ-AUKWTSKRSA-N; (Z): InChI=1S/C21H28O2/c1-4-16-19(23)12-18-15-6-5-13-11-14(22)7-9-20(13,2)17(15)8-10-21(16,18)3/h4,11,15,17-18H,5-10,12H2,1-3H3/b16-4+/t15-,17+,18+,20+,21-/m1/s1 Key: WDXRGPWQVHZTQJ-OSJVMJFVSA-N
- SMILES: (E): O=C1C[C@@]2([H])[C@]3([H])CCC4=CC(CC[C@]4(C)[C@@]3([H])CC[C@]2(C)/C1=C\C)=O; (Z): O=C1C[C@@]2([H])[C@]3([H])CCC4=CC(CC[C@]4(C)[C@@]3([H])CC[C@]2(C)/C1=C/C)=O

Properties
Chemical formula	C_{21}H_{28}O_{2}
Molar mass	312.453 g·mol^{−1}
- Except where otherwise noted, data are given for materials in their standard state (at 25 °C [77 °F], 100 kPa). verify (what is ?) Infobox references

Guggulsterone is a phytosteroid found in the resin of the guggul plant, Commiphora mukul. Guggulsterone can exist as either of two stereoisomers, E-guggulsterone and Z-guggulsterone. In humans, it acts as an antagonist of the farnesoid X receptor, which was once believed to result in decreased cholesterol synthesis in the liver. Several studies have been published that indicate no overall reduction in total cholesterol occurs using various dosages of guggulsterone, and levels of low-density lipoprotein ("bad cholesterol") increased in many people. Nevertheless, guggulsterone is an ingredient in many nutritional supplements. Guggulsterone was also found to have interactions with the viral ADP ribose phosphatase enzyme of SARS-CoV-2 and has been proposed as a potential candidate for the development of therapeutics for the treatment of COVID-19.

Guggulsterone is a broad-spectrum ligand of steroid hormone receptors, and is known to possess the following activities:

- Mineralocorticoid receptor antagonist (K_{i} = 39 nM)
- Progesterone receptor partial agonist (K_{i} = 201 nM)
- Glucocorticoid receptor antagonist (K_{i} = 224 nM)
- Androgen receptor antagonist (K_{i} = 240 nM)
- Estrogen receptor agonist (K_{i} > 5 μM; EC_{50} > 5 μM)
- Farnesoid X receptor antagonist (IC_{50} = 5–50 μM)
- Pregnane X receptor agonist (EC_{50} = 2.4 μM ((Z)-isomer))

Guggulsterone has been found in animal research to be orally active; it has an absolute bioavailability of 42.9% after oral administration in rats, with a half-life of around 10 hours in this species, indicating a good pharmacokinetic profile.

== Synthesis ==
Guggulsterone can be synthesized from 16-DPA, progesterone or DHEA.

A synthesis of guggulsterone from 16-DPA is described. Note that for the first step in the patent LiAlH4 is used in THF. Additionally another synthesis patent was found which uses Red-Al for the reduction step:

The reduction of 16-DPA [979-02-2] with sodium borohydride leads to 5,16-pregnadiene-3b-20 diol, PC22295555 (2). Acetylation is accompanied by some kind of a bond reorganization to give PC58830759, PC90955911 or PC90960662 (3). Saponification of both the acetyl groups gives PC90795454 (4). Oppenauer oxidation concludes the synthesis (5).
