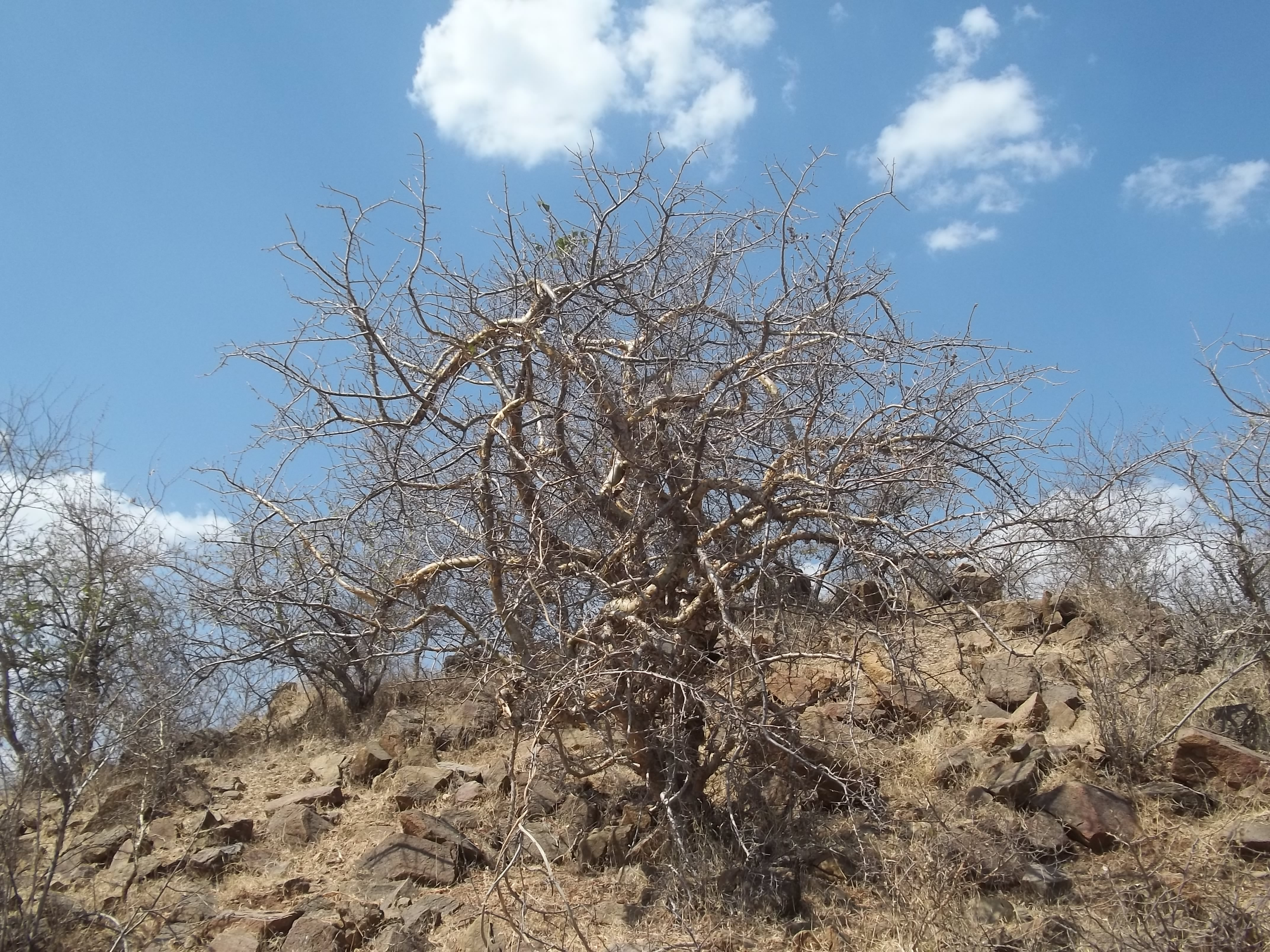
- Guggul tree in its natural habitat

Conservation status
- Critically Endangered (IUCN 3.1)

Scientific classification
- Kingdom: Plantae
- Clade: Embryophytes
- Clade: Tracheophytes
- Clade: Spermatophytes
- Clade: Angiosperms
- Clade: Eudicots
- Clade: Rosids
- Order: Sapindales
- Family: Burseraceae
- Genus: Commiphora
- Species: C. wightii

Binomial name
- Commiphora wightii (Arn.) Bhandari

Synonyms
- Commiphora mukul (Stocks) Hook.; Commiphora roxburghii (Stocks) Engl.

= Commiphora wightii =

Species of plant

Commiphora wightii, with common names Indian bdellium-tree, gugal, guggal, guggul, gugul, or mukul myrrh tree, is a flowering plant in the family Burseraceae, which produces a fragrant resin called gugal, guggul or gugul, that is used in incense and vedic medicine (or ayurveda). The species is native to western India, from where it was introduced westward to southern Pakistan and the middle-east. It prefers arid and semi-arid climates and is tolerant of poor soil.

== Description ==
Commiphora wightii grows as a shrub or small tree, reaching a maximum height of 4 m (13 ft), with thin papery bark. The branches are thorny. The leaves are simple or trifoliate, the leaflets ovate, 1–5 cm (0.39–1.97 in) long, 0.5–2.5 cm (0.20–0.98 in) broad, and irregularly toothed. It is gynodioecious, with some plants bearing bisexual and male flowers, and others with female flowers. The individual flowers are red to pink, with four small petals. The small round fruit are red when ripe.

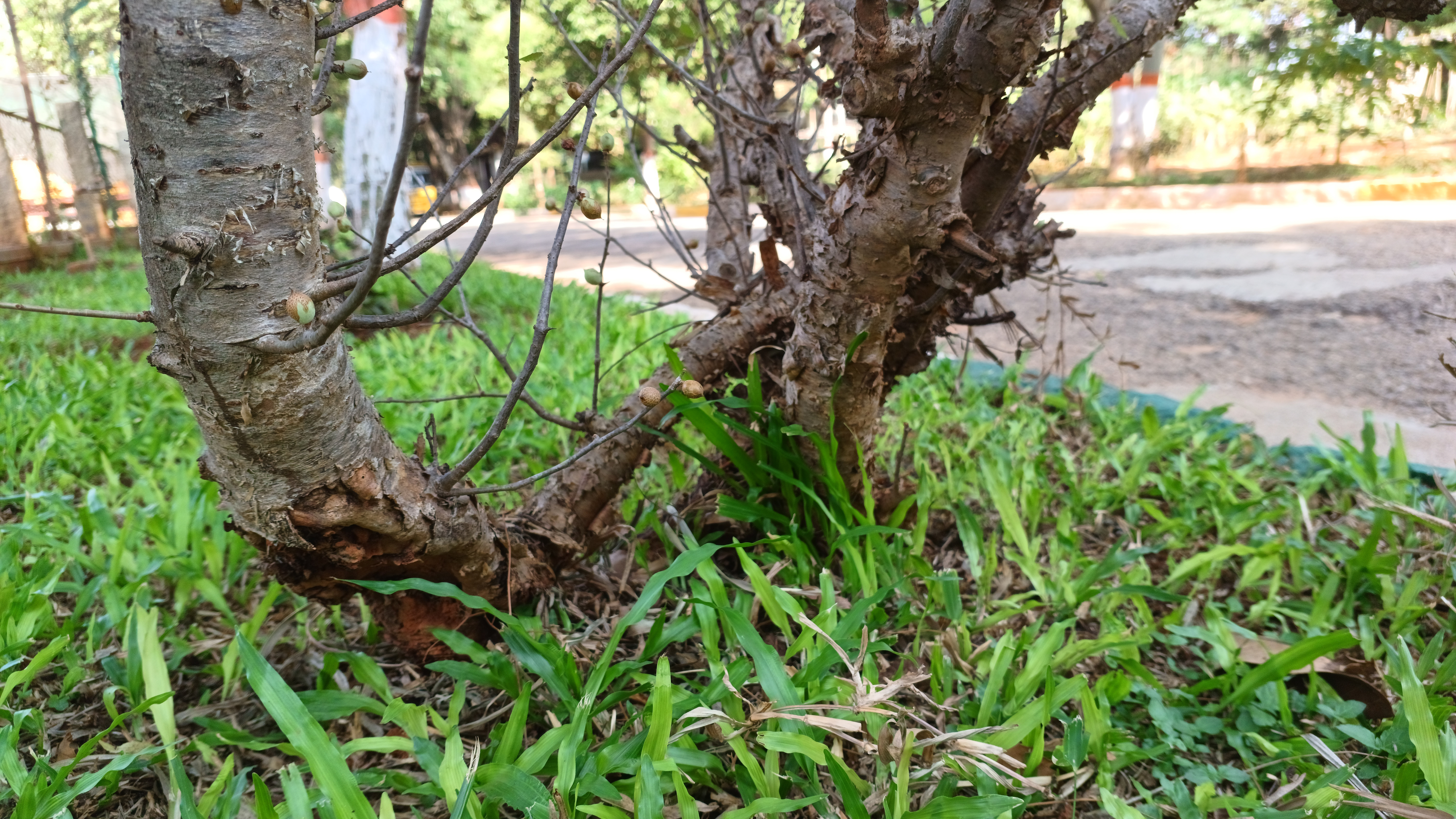
trunks

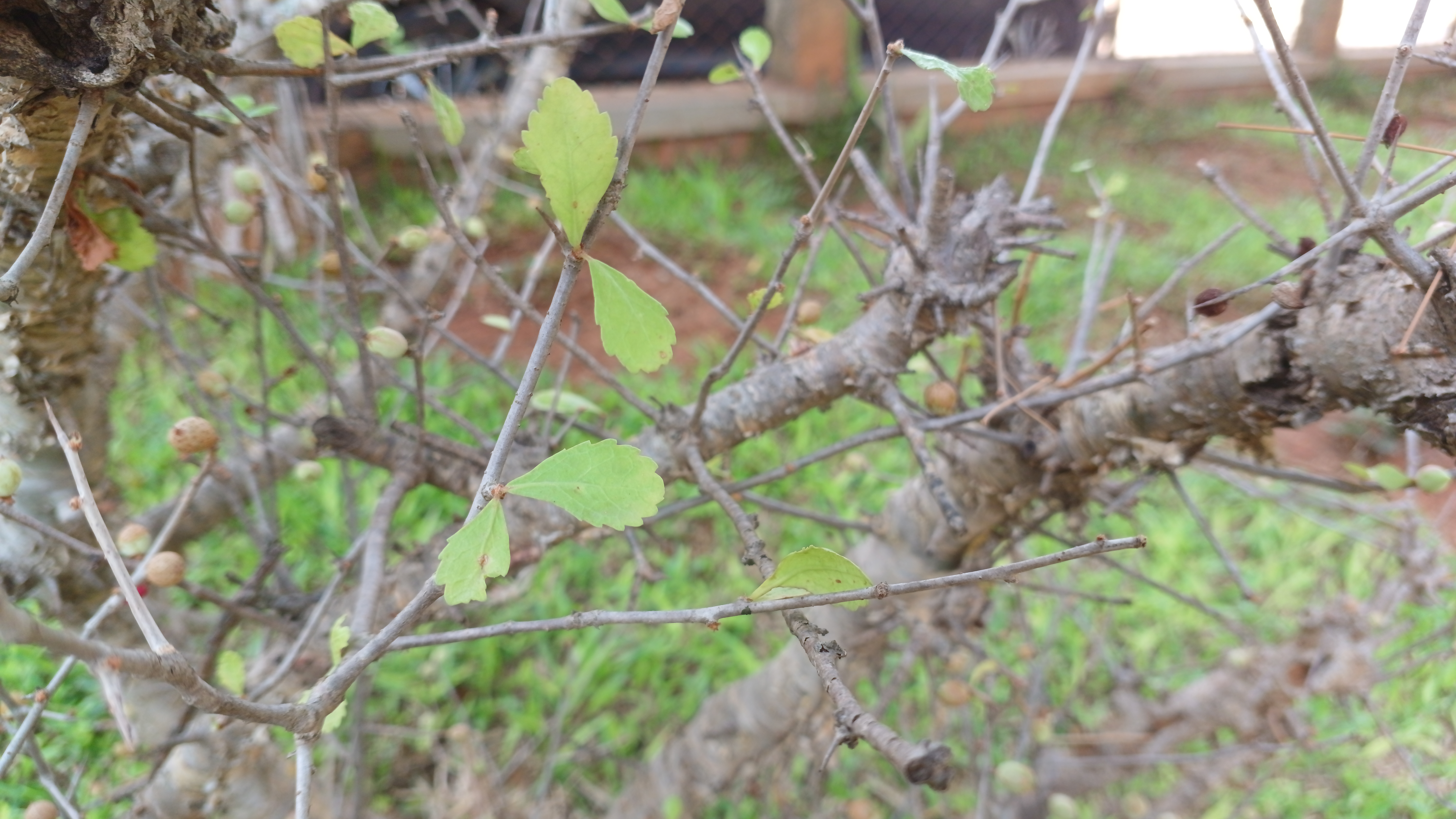
twigs and leaves

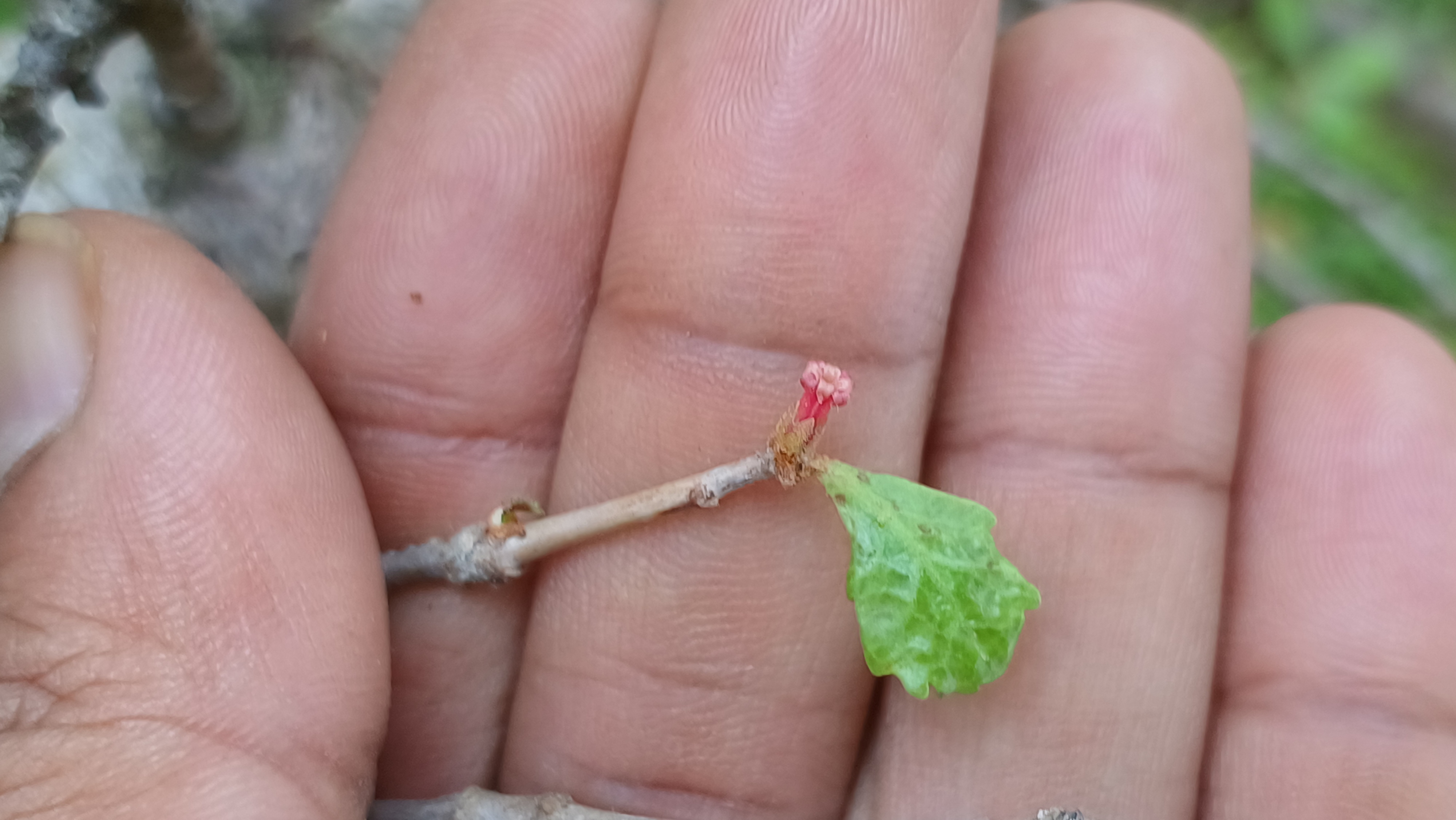
a flower

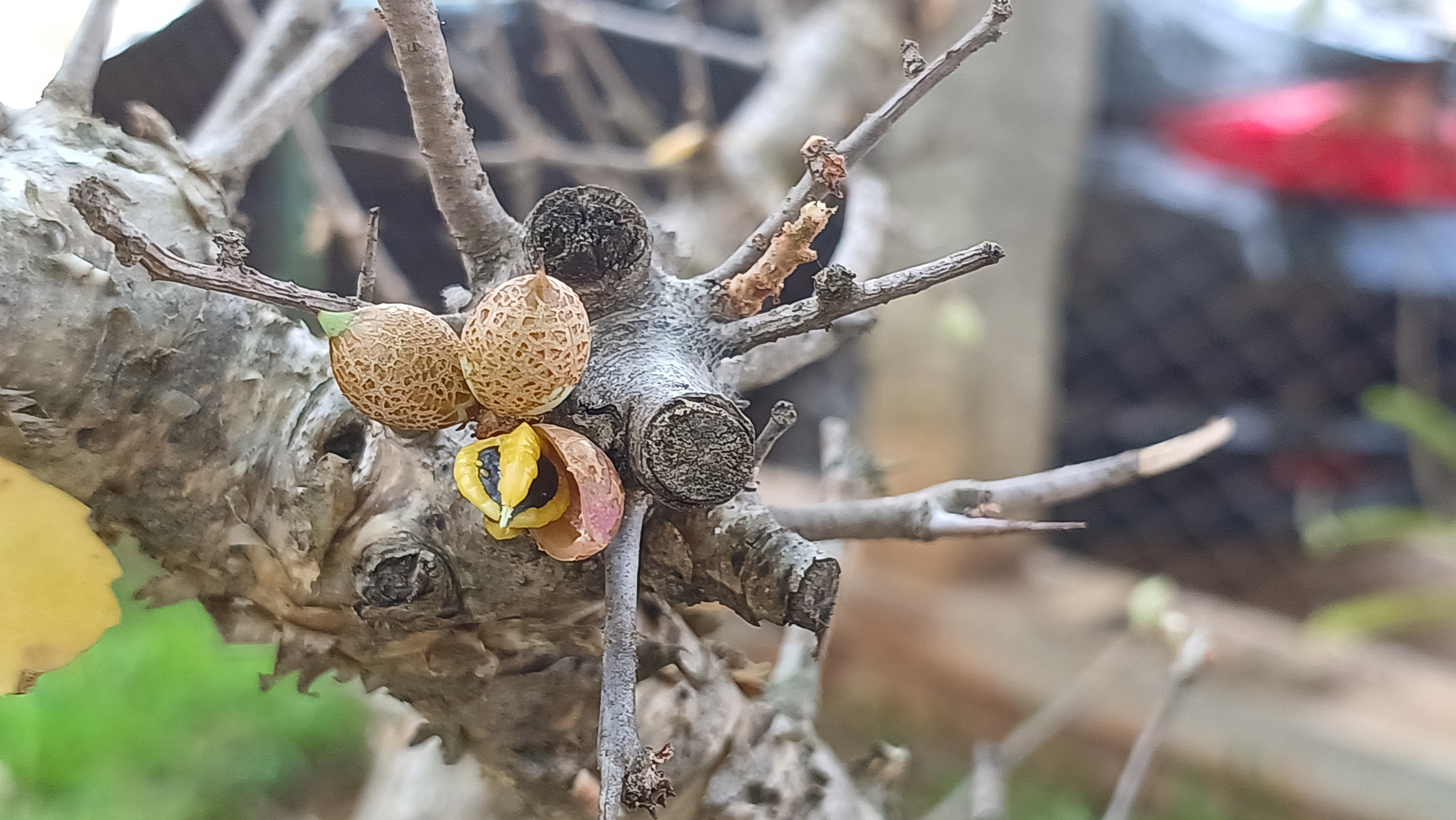
drupes and a black seed with a yellow pseodo-aril

== Cultivation and uses ==
Commiphora wightii is sought for its gummy resin, which is harvested from the plant's bark through the process of tapping. In India and Pakistan, guggul is cultivated commercially. The resin of C. wightii, known as gum guggulu, has a fragrance nearly identical to myrrh, (which is a close relative the bdellium tree), and also closely resembles fragrance of the Opopanax resin (from the Commiphora Erythrea or Commiphora Guidottii trees, also closely related to Indian Bdellium). It is the same product that was known in Hebrew, ancient Greek and Latin sources as bdellium, commonly used in incense and perfumes for centuries.

Guggul is also used in Ayurveda remedies and it is mentioned in Ayurvedic texts dating back to 600 BC. It is often sold as a herbal supplement.

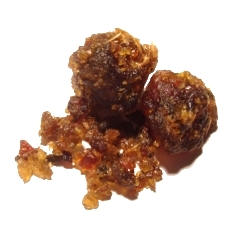
guggul resin

The gum can be purchased in a loosely packed form called dhoop, an incense from India, which is burned over hot coals. This produces a fragrant, dense smoke. It is also sold in the form of incense sticks and dhoop cones which can be burned directly.

== Chemical composition ==
Over a hundred metabolites of various chemical compositions were reported from the leaves, stem, latex, root and fruit samples. High concentrations of quinic acid and myo-inositol were found in fruits and leaves.

== Traditional medicinal use ==
Commiphora wightii has been a key component in ancient Indian Ayurvedic system of medicine.

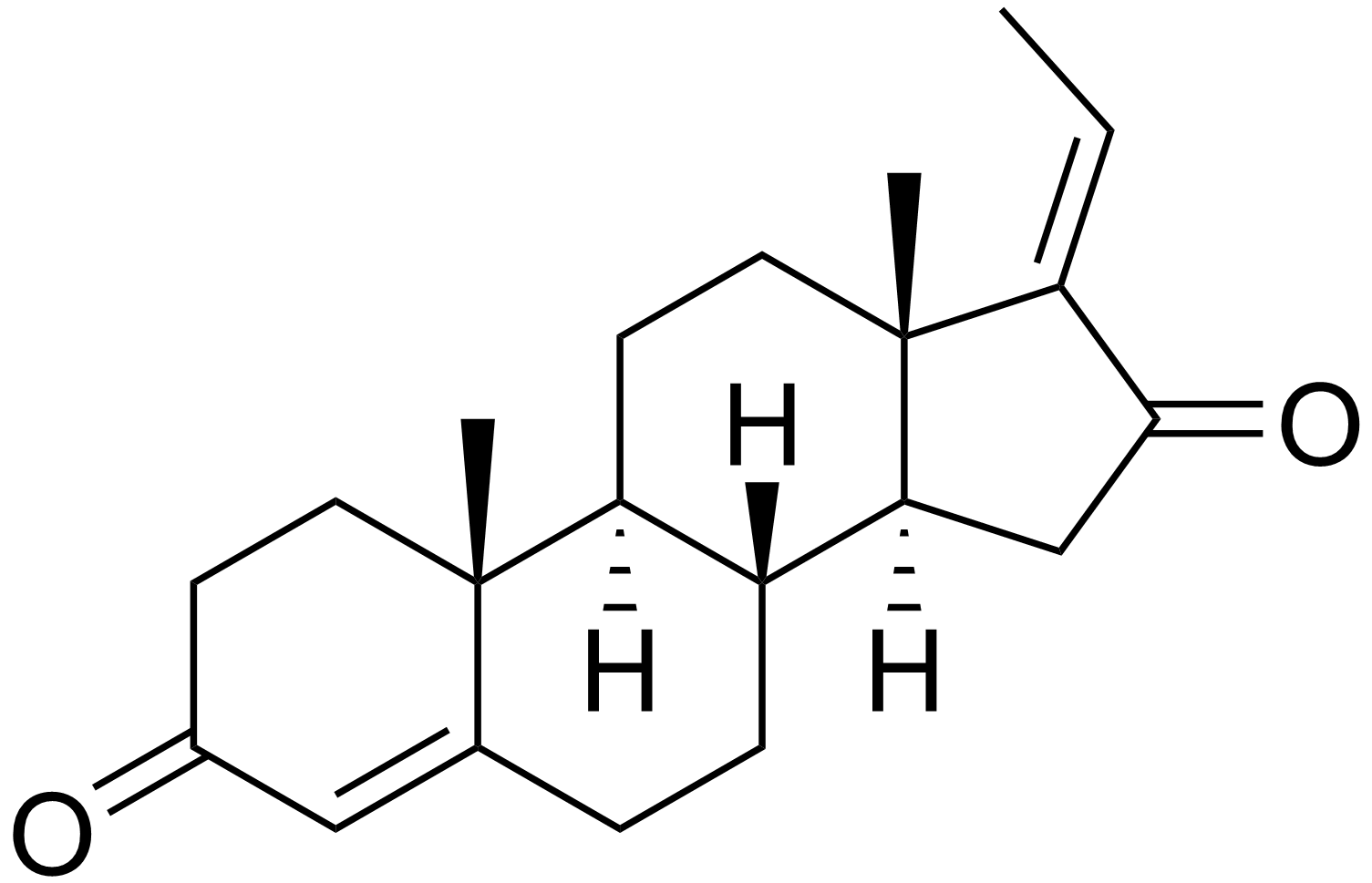
Chemical structure of guggulsterone, a constituent of gum guggul

The extract of gum guggul, called gugulipid, guggulipid, or guglipid, has been used in Unani and Ayurvedic medicine, for nearly 3,000 years in India. One chemical ingredient in the extract is the steroid guggulsterone, which acts as an antagonist of the farnesoid X receptor, once believed to result in decreased cholesterol synthesis in the liver. However, several studies have been published that indicate no overall reduction in total cholesterol occurs using various dosages of guggulsterone and levels of low-density lipoprotein ("bad cholesterol") increased in many people.

== Endangerment and rescue ==
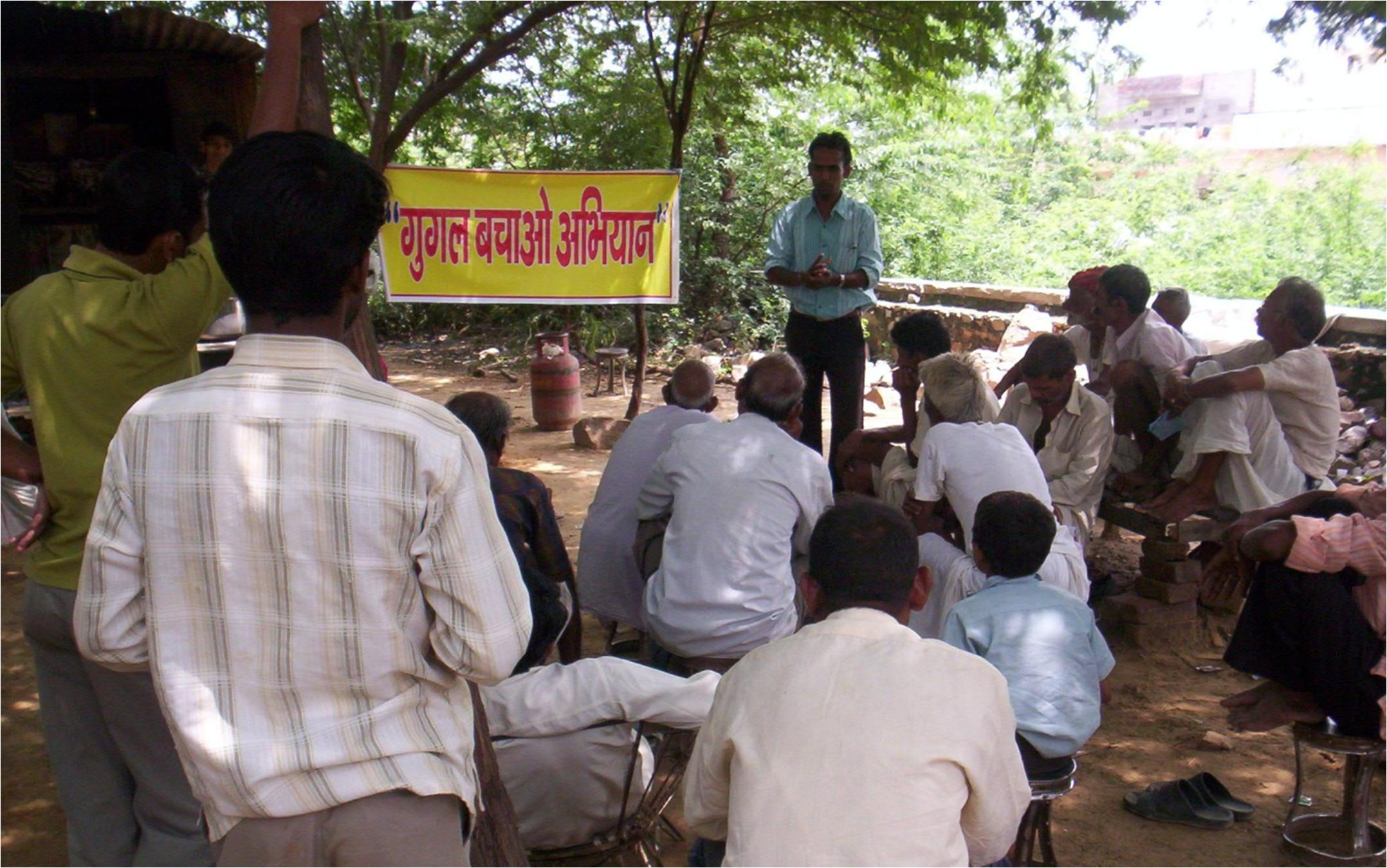
'Save Guggul Movement' in Rajasthan, India

Because of its use in traditional medicine, C. wightii has been overharvested, and has become so scarce in its two habitats in India—Gujarat and Rajasthan—that the World Conservation Union (IUCN) has enlisted it in its IUCN Red List of threatened species. Several efforts are in place to address this situation. India's National Medicinal Plants Board launched a project in Kutch District to cultivate 500 to 800 hectares (1,200 to 2,000 acres) of guggal, while a grass-roots conservation movement, led by IUCN associate Vineet Soni, has been started to educate guggal growers and harvesters in safe, sustainable harvesting methods.
