= Maharaja College, Jaipur =

College in Jaipur, India

- Other name: University Maharaja College
- Type: Government
- Established: 1844
- Founder: Sawai Ram Singh
- Parent institution: Rajasthan University, Jaipur
- Affiliations: University of Rajasthan, Jaipur
- Chancellor: Governor of Rajasthan
- Students: about 2500
- Location: Jaipur, Rajasthan, 0141, India; 26°54′38.16″N 75°48′54.04″E
- Campus: Urban
- Website: https://www.uniraj.ac.in/MaharajaCollege

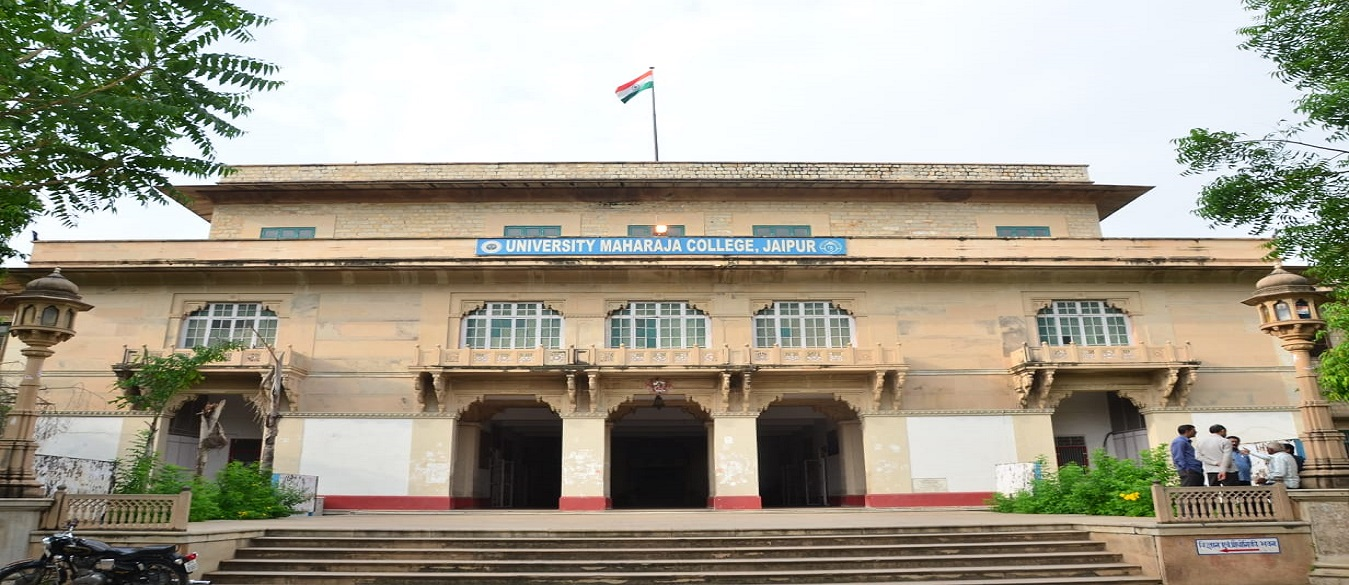
This is the banner at the school entrance.

University Maharaja's College is a college in Jaipur, the capital of the Rajasthan state in India. Established in 1844 by Sawai Ram Singh II, it has been affiliated with University of Rajasthan since 1947. Maharaja college offers course on campus in Bachelor of Science (BSc) and Bachelor of Computer Application (B.C.A) at Undergraduate (U.G.) level. The college was granted the status of "college with potential excellence" by UGC in 2011.

== History ==
It was established in 1844 as Maharaja's School by Maharaja of Jaipur, Sawai Ram Singh II, along with Shivdeen Pandit, who also became its first principal. Originally affiliated with University of Calcutta, and subsequently with University of Allahabad in 1890, the college went on to become one of six constituent colleges of University of Rajasthan, established in 1947. It is one of the oldest colleges of North India and was designed by British architects and building provide a royal look.

Initially education was started in Hindi, Persian, English, Urdu and Sanskrit to 40 students. The college grew rapidly and in 1852 it was split to create a Sanskrit college under Shree Haridas Shastri. In 1873, Master Kanti Chandra Mukharjee becomes Head Master, this college was raised to international level and got affiliated to Calcutta University. By 1875, the number of students reached 800 and it continued to flourished. It was later affiliated to Allahabad University in 1890 for B.A degree and was raised to Postgraduate in 1896. Postgraduate courses in History, Philosophy, and Mathematics were introduced in 1927. The college was shifted to present building in 1933. The college becomes a constituent college of University of Rajasthan in 1947 which offers Undergraduate courses. This college was imparting education to both boys and girls till the establishment of Maharani college in 1944.

Playground of this college has witnessed several sports event, till the establishment of Sawai-Man Singh Stadium, including the cricket match played by MCC in 1961 where Mr. Salim Durani was main attraction.

== Facilities ==
The college was granted the status of "college with potential excellence " by UGC in 2011. More than 2500 students are actively enrolled in this college. The college has its own boys hostel with capacity of 220 students. It has well furnished library with more than one lac books and magazines. It has sports facilities including three Volleyball court, two tennis court, and one basketball court, gymnasiums and facility for indoor sports. Four unit of NSS and three unit of NCC are working here. The college has attracted several multinational companies including IBM Daksh, Wipro, TCS, Accenture etc. who organized placement camp at this college.

=== Hostel ===
Gokhale hostel is located in the vicinity of the University Maharaja College campus and it was established about 70-year back. The residential facility is offered to full time undergraduate students admitted to Maharaja College. The environment of the hostel provides the matrix for full-fledged immersion in the sprit of the college. The hostel provides accommodation for 220 students. Due to limited availability of the accommodation fresh admission in the hostel is provided to only those students who are admitted in the college in the part-I on the basis of merit list calculated from the marks obtained in 12th board examination.

=== Library ===
Maharaja college library located near the open air theater in the college campus. It has seating capacity of about 80 students. It has more than one lac books. The library subscribes to about 29 popular newspapers and magazines relating to various subjects.

=== NCC (National Cadet Core) ===
There are three units of NCC at Maharaja College. The selection for NCC are held annually in the month of July/August. Students must be enrolled in an educational institution to be applicable for NCC. Students have to face different eligibility examination level like Physical, written, interview, and medical. Total training period is three years with an extension of one year in exceptional condition. Every cadet has to undergo service training for a period of at least four hours per week during the training year.

=== NSS (National Service Scheme) ===
A two-year program related to various social and cultural activities. Now in 2020 having Four active NSS Units.

== Activities ==
The college organize a three-day inter-college cultural festival "AQUAREGIA" annually in the month of January or February. It is a three-day event which attracts participant from several institutions for various events. It has various another sports and cultural programme at State and National level.

== Notable alumni ==
- Shri Jagdeep Dhankar - Former Governor of West Bengal and Vice president of India
- Shri Bhairon Singh Shekhawat - Former Chief minister Rajasthan and Former Vice president of India
- Shree Bihar Lal Agarwal, Indian Freedom Fighter a student of this college during 1939, actively participated in Prajamandal Andolan. His forty-five-day dharna at college gate was noticed and reported by International Newspaper including New York Times.
- Vineet Soni, Plant biologist
- Jainendra K. Jain, theoretical physicist
- Gopinath Kaviraj (1887–1976), Sanskrit scholar, philosopher, Padma Vibhushan (1964)
- Vijendra Kumar, Boxer and Politician
- Vidyadhar Govind Oak, I.C.S, Chief Justice of the Allahabad High Court
- Captain Harshvardhan Singh, Indian Army
- Lokendra Kumar, Indian Railway Management Service [UPSC CSE, 2024]
- Ram Narayan Chaudhary, an Gandhian social reformer, anti-colonial nationalist, writer, and publisher
- Kamla Beniwal, Indian independence activist and veteran politician who served as the deputy chief minister of Rajasthan and first female minister.
- Hiralal Shastri, first Chief Minister of Rajasthan
