= Centenary Prize =

- Awarded for: For "outstanding chemists, who are also exceptional communicators, from overseas"
- Sponsored by: Royal Society of Chemistry
- Date: 1947
- Reward: £5,000
- Website: www.rsc.org/standards-and-recognition/prizes/research-and-innovation-prizes/centenary-prizes-for-chemistry-and-communication/

The Centenary Prize is an award granted annually by the United Kingdom-based Royal Society of Chemistry (RSC) to up to three "outstanding chemists, who are also exceptional communicators, from overseas".

The prize, established in 1947, and first awarded in 1949, by the RSC's forerunner, the Chemical Society, is named after the centenary of that organisation's founding, in 1841. Winners are given a £5000 cash prize, a medal and a certificate, and undertake a lecture tour of the UK.

== Winners ==
- 1949 Vladimir Prelog, Edgar Lederer, Michel Magat
- 1950 Placidus Plattner
- 1951 Robert B. Woodward, Kaj Ulrik Linderstrøm-Lang
- 1952 Tadeusz Reichstein
- 1953 Arne Tiselius
- 1954 Richard H. F. Manske
- 1955 Melvin Calvin, Herbert C. Brown
- 1956 Glenn T. Seaborg
- 1957 Hans Brockmann, Odd Hassel
- 1958 Gerhard Herzberg, Klaus Clusius, Wilhelm Klemm
- 1959 George Hamilton Cady, Nils Andreas Sørensen, Michael Heidelberger
- 1960 Rolf Huisgen, Alexander Nikolaievich Terenin
- 1961 George B. Kistiakowsky, Hans Schmid
- 1962 Frank Westheimer, Richard Kuhn
- 1963 Carl Djerassi
- 1964 John C. Polanyi, Feodor Lynen
- 1965 Charles B. Colburn, Wiktor Kemula, John D. Roberts
- 1966 Shōji Shibata, Lars Gunnar Sillen
- 1967 Saul Winstein
- 1968 Erwin Wilhelm Müller, Paul Doughty Bartlett
- 1969 Albert Eschenmoser
- 1970 Elias J. Corey, Edgar Bright Wilson
- 1971 Ronald Breslow, William Lipscomb
- 1972 John Anthony Pople, Jan Peter Toennies, William Summer Johnson
- 1973 Duilio Arigoni, Frank Albert Cotton, Hellmuth Fischer
- 1974 Gilbert Stork, Ernst Otto Fischer, Roald Hoffmann
- 1975 Donald J. Cram, John B. Goodenough, Willis H. Flygare
- 1976 Dudley R. Herschbach, Alfred Edward Ringwood, Karel Wiesner
- 1977 Jack D. Dunitz, George A. Olah, Kenneth Sanborn Pitzer
- 1978 Heinz Gerischer, Koji Nakanishi, Heinrich Nöth
- 1979 Richard H. Holm, Satoru Masamune, Henry Taube
- 1980 James Ibers, Jean-Marie Lehn, Mark E. Volpin, Jürgen Troe
- 1981 Barry Trost, Earl Muetterties, Takeshi Oka
- 1982 Alan MacDiarmid, Massimo Simonetta, Albert I. Meyers
- 1983 Gábor A. Somorjai, Virgil Boekelheide, Hubert Schmidbaur
- 1984 Harry B. Gray, Meir Lahav, Benjamin Widom
- 1985 Gerhard Ertl, Léon Ghosez, Herbert W. Roesky
- 1986 Robert Bruce Merrifield, Stuart A. Rice, Alan H. Cowley
- 1987 Allen J. Bard, William A. G. Graham, Christopher T. Walsh
- 1988 Rudolph A. Marcus, Ryōji Noyori, Warren R. Roper
- 1989 Carlo Floriani, Marc Julia, Endel Lippmaa
- 1990 Richard R. Schrock, Dieter Seebach, Noel S. Hush
- 1991 Vitaly Goldansky, Athelstan Beckwith, Thomas J. Meyer
- 1992 Leo A. Paquette, Alan Sargeson, Henry F. Schaefer
- 1993 Alexander Pines, Barry Sharpless, Helmut Werner
- 1994 Malcolm H. Chisholm, A. Ian Scott, Kirill Zamarayev
- 1995 Clayton H. Heathcock, Vincenzo Balzani, Graham R. Fleming
- 1996 Colette Demuynck, Helmut Ringsdorf, Tobin J. Marks
- 1997 Richard Zare, Larry E. Overman, Arndt Simon
- 1998 Robert F. Curl, Marion Frederick Hawthorne, James D. White
- 1999 Jean-Pierre Sauvage, Henri Kagan, Robin Hochstrasser
- 2000 Maurice Brookhart, Jean F. Normant, C. N. R. Rao
- 2001 Kyriacos Costa Nicolaou, Richard J. Saykally, Karl Weighardt
- 2002 Manfred T. Reetz, Gérard Jaouen, Amos B. Smith
- 2003 Akkihebbal Ravishankara, Edward I. Solomon, Alois Fürstner
- 2004 Robert Grubbs, Eric Herbst, Marc-Jacques Ledoux
- 2005 Goverdhan Mehta, Vivian Wing-Wah Yam, Royce W. Murray
- 2006 Stephen J. Benkovic, Hans-Joachim Freund, Ilya I. Moiseev
- 2007 Trygve Helgaker, Don Tilley, James A. Marshall
- 2008 F. Fleming Crim, Masakatsu Shibasaki, Achim Müller
  - the 2009/2010 lectures were delivered by: Michel Che, John Katzenellenbogen, Leonard Francis Lindoy
- 2009 Aaron Ciechanover, Yoshinori Yamamoto, Martin Jansen
- 2010 Avelino Corma Canos, Stephen Lippard, Omar Yaghi
- 2011 G. Marius Clore, Jonathan Sessler, R. Graham Cooks
- 2012 Craig Hawker, Timothy M. Swager, Stephen Withers
- 2013 Robert H. Crabtree, Richard Silverman, Chi-Ming Che
- 2014 Eiichi Nakamura, Fraser Stoddart, Karen L. Wooley
- 2015 Chad Mirkin, Geoffrey Ozin, Jean-Marie Tarascon,
- 2016 Kenneth Suslick, R. J. Dwayne Miller, Michael Grätzel
- 2017 Odile Eisenstein, William J. Evans, Ben Feringa
- 2018 Jacqueline Barton, John Hartwig, Richard Kaner
- 2019 Laura Kiessling, David MacMillan, Roberta Sessoli
- 2020 Eric Anslyn, Teri W. Odom, James Tour
- 2021 Bin Liu, Jean-Luc Brédas, Douglas Stephan
- 2022 Michelle Chang, Joseph Francisco, Catherine Murphy
- 2023 Christopher Barner-Kowollik, Mercouri Kanatzidis, Mark Grinstaff
- 2024 Luisa De Cola, Nicholas Kotov, Xiaogang Liu
- 2025 Donna Blackmond, Sarbajit Banerjee, Seth Cohen
- 2026 Federico Rosei, Matthias Drieß, Neil Garg

== See also ==
- List of chemistry awards
