= Reed McNeil Izatt =

American chemist (1926–2023)

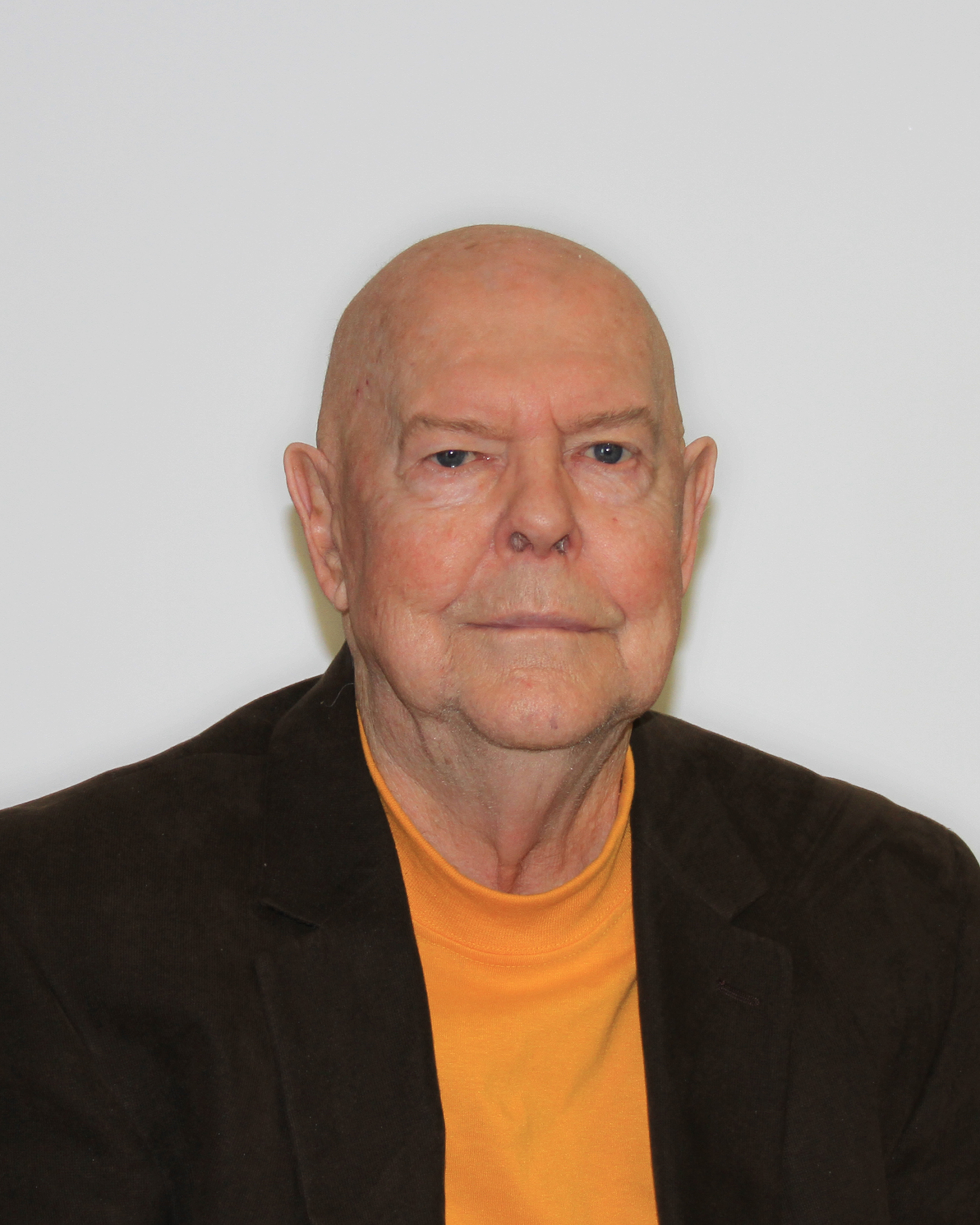
Reed McNeil Izatt

Reed McNeil Izatt (October 10, 1926 – October 29, 2023) was an American chemist who was emeritus Charles E. Maw Professor of Chemistry at Brigham Young University in Provo, Utah. His field of research was macrocyclic chemistry and metal separation technologies.

== Biography ==
Reed McNeil Izatt was born in Logan, Utah on October 10, 1926. His first ten years were spent on a ranch in Sumpter Valley, Oregon where he attended school in a two-room schoolhouse. He developed an interest in geology and astronomy. His family then returned to Logan, Utah and he graduated from Logan High School in 1944. On June 6, 1944, Izatt enrolled at Utah State Agricultural College (now Utah State University).

In 1945 and 1946, Izatt served in the United States Army and from 1947 to 1949, he was a missionary in the United Kingdom for the Church of Jesus Christ of Latter-day Saints. While stationed at Fort Douglas, Izatt studied at the University of Utah and in 1951, he received a bachelor of science in chemistry. Izatt took postgraduate studies in chemistry at Pennsylvania State University. He was mentored by W. Conard Fernelius and in 1954 received a doctorate degree.

Izatt died in Salt Lake City, Utah, on October 29, 2023, at the age of 97.

== Career ==
Izatt worked at the Mellon Institute for Industrial Research (now part of Carnegie Mellon University) for two years before taking a faculty position in the Department of Chemistry at Brigham Young University (BYU). He retired from BYU in 1993 as the Charles E. Maw Professor of Chemistry. Izatt and James J. Christensen, a chemical engineer, founded a thermochemical institute at BYU to promote and facilitate interdisciplinary research.

=== ISI Ranking ===
Reed M. Izatt's number in the ISI rankings is 68.

== Scientific work ==
Izatt and his colleagues, James J. Christensen and John L. Oscarson constructed and used a variety of novel high precision calorimeters to study a number of host and guest chemical systems of both academic and commercial interest. Izatt's thermodynamic results have been used in the development of macrocyclic and supramolecular chemistry, molecular recognition, heats of mixing, nucleic acid chemistry, metal cyanide chemistry, chemical separations, amino acid microspecies formation and high- temperature corrosion chemistry.

=== Macrocyclic chemistry ===
Izatt and Christensen made the first extensive thermodynamic study using titration calorimetry of the highly selective metal complexation properties of metal-cyclic polyether interactions. This work was followed by research correlating metal ion selectivity to macrocycle structure in a variety of solvents using a range of metal ions and organic amine cations.

Using chiral macrocycles and chiral alkylammonium salts, Izatt and his colleagues were the first to establish host–guest chiral recognition in a given system by more than one experimental method (temperature-dependent ^{1}HNMR spectroscopy in CD_{2}Cl_{2}, titration calorimetry in methanol, and selective crystallization) and to report K, ΔH, and ΔS values for the interactions, thus quantitating the reactions. Subsequent x- ray crystallographic results provided a structural basis for the recognition.

Use of fluorophores appended to macrocycles provides advantages over other techniques for selective and sensitive metal ion detection. Izatt demonstrated that certain 8-¬hydroxyquinoline derivatives attached to diazamacrocycles elicit a strong fluorescent response when complexed to selected closed-shell metal ions. That is, Hg^{2+}, [[Cd^{2+}]], [[Zn^{2+}]] and [[Mg^{2+}]]. The novelty of this work lies in the high-fluorescent selectivity these ligands possess for the indicated metal ions in the presence of competing metal ions. The work presents the possibility of producing novel supported sensor systems capable of metal detection. In principle, detection limits could be well below parts per trillion (ng/mL). This level of detection coupled with the high metal ion selectivity imparted by the macrocyclic ligand could make these systems valuable in detecting target metal ions in environmental chemistry and as a means of continuously monitoring target metal ion concentrations in industrial streams.

=== Separations chemistry ===
Izatt and his colleagues were the first to attach macrocycles to a solid matrix and make highly selective metal separations. This achievement resulted in the establishment of IBC Advanced Technologies, Inc. (IBC) which commercialized the discovery.

=== Awards ===
Izatt was a fellow of the American Association for the Advancement of Science (1982). He was the BYU Annual Faculty Lecture in 1970. Izatt received the Utah Award (1971) (Salt Lake Section, American Chemical Society); the Huffman Award (1983) (Calorimetry Conference); the American Chemical Society Separations Science and Technology Award (1996); the Utah Governor's Medal for Science and Technology (1990); and the First Annual Alumni Achievement Award (2001) (Utah State University Department of Chemistry and Biochemistry).

== Legacy ==
=== Commercialization of research results ===
In the 1960s, Izatt and Christensen developed high-precision titration calorimeters capable of simultaneously measuring equilibrium constants and heats for chemical reactions rapidly and with precision. These calorimeters were marketed worldwide through TRONAC, a chemical instrumentation company located in Provo, Utah. This calorimeter line was later acquired by TA Instruments.

In 1988, IBC Advanced Technologies, Incorporated (IBC) was founded in Provo, Utah by Izatt, Bradshaw and Christensen. IBC commercialized work in chemical separations using an environmentally safe process based on molecular recognition technology (MRT). The MRT process enables the rapid and highly selective separation of metals from solutions even in the presence of complex matrices consisting of high concentrations of competing metals and high concentrations of acids or bases. This technology is important in the purification of precious, rare, and base metals during the refining process as well as in the recovery of these metals from spent products such as catalysts and electronics. IBC's MRT products are effective in the remediation of radioactive waste, selectively separating and concentrating radionuclides such as Cs, Sr, Tc, and Ra. In addition, IBC's MRT products are used for analytical sample preparation and determination of metals, including toxic metals and radionuclides.

=== International macrocyclic chemistry symposia ===
In 1977, Izatt and Christensen organized the first Symposium on Macrocylic Compounds in Provo, Utah. In 1985, this and related symposia were incorporated into the International Symposium on Macrocyclic Chemistry (ISMC). In 2006, ISMC was expanded to include supramolecular chemistry and the name was changed to International Symposium on Macrocyclic and Supramolecular Chemistry (ISMSC).

=== International Izatt-Christensen award ===
Since 1991, the International Izatt-Christensen award is presented annually at the ISMC (until 2005) and ISMSC (from 2006) meetings. The award recognizes excellence in macrocyclic and supramolecular chemistry and is regarded as the highest international award in these areas. Recipients include:

- Jean-Pierre Sauvage (1991)
- Eiichi Kimura (1992)
- J. Fraser Stoddart (1993)
- Daryle H. Busch (1994)
- David N. Reinhoudt (1995)
- George W. Gokel (1996)
- Alan M. Sargeson (1997)
- Seiji Shinkai (1998)
- Fritz Vögtle (1999)
- Jerry L. Atwood (2000)
- Jonathan Sessler (2001)
- David Gutsche (2002)
- Jeremy Sanders (2003)
- Makoto Fujita (2004)
- Kenneth Raymond (2005)
- Roeland Nolte (2006)
- David Leigh (2007)
- Akira Harada (2008)
- Omar M. Yaghi (2009)
- Luigi Fabbrizzi (2010)
- Andrew D. Hamilton (2011)
- Kimoon Kim (2012)
- Eric V. Anslyn (2013)
- Mir Wais Hosseini (2014)
- Paul D. Beer (2015)
- Hanadi Sleiman (2016)
- Harry L. Anderson (2017)
- Philip A. Gale (2018)
- Luisa De Cola (2019)
- Mitsuhiko Shionoya (2020)
- Ivan Huc (2021)
- Jonathan Nitschke (2022)
- Sijbren Otto (2023)
- Enrico Dalcanale (2024)
- Christopher A. Hunter (2025)

=== Endowed Reed M. Izatt and James J. Christensen awards ===
In 2007, Izatt created an endowment at Brigham Young University to reward faculty excellence in research in the Department of Chemistry and Biochemistry and in the Department of Chemical Engineering, and to provide funds to invite an eminent scientist or engineer from the worldwide community to present two lectures to the combined Departments of Chemistry and Biochemistry, and Chemical Engineering, one more universal in nature for the general public and the second more technical in nature for faculty and students. Recipients of the Reed M. Izatt Faculty Excellence in Research Award in Chemistry include:

- Milton L. Lee (2008)
- Paul B. Savage (2010)
- Adam T. Woolley (2012)

The Reed M. Izatt and James J. Christensen lecturers include:

- J. Fraser Stoddart (15–16 November 2007)
- Gabor A. Somorjai (21–22 January 2009)
- George M. Whitesides (3–4 November 2009)
- Robert Byron Bird (17–18 November 2010)
- Richard N. Zare (7–8 February 2012)
- Robert Langer (6–7 February 2013)
- Mario Capecchi (23–24 January 2014)
- Alexis T. Bell (19 March 2015)
- R. Graham Cooks (20-21 March 2017)
- Franklin Orr (19-20 October 2017)
- Geraldine L. Richmond (26-27 February 2019)
- Thomas F. Edgar (19-20 February 2020)
- Juan J. de Pablo (16 February 2023)
- Frances Ligler (12-13 March 2024)
- Nicholas A. Peppas (13-14 March 2024)
- Glenn Fredrickson (6 Feb 2025)
