= AIE =

AIE may refer to:

- Academy of Interactive Entertainment, an Australian video games and 3D animation school
- International Energy Agency (French: Agence internationale de l'énergie), a Paris-based autonomous intergovernmental organization
- Alianţa pentru Integrare Europeană, the Alliance for European Integration (Romanian abbreviation AIE)
- Air Inuit (ICAO code), an airline based in Dorval, Quebec, Canada
- Aggregation-induced emission, a luminescent phenomenon discovered by Ben Zhong Tang et al. in 2001
