= Bin Liu =

Chemist

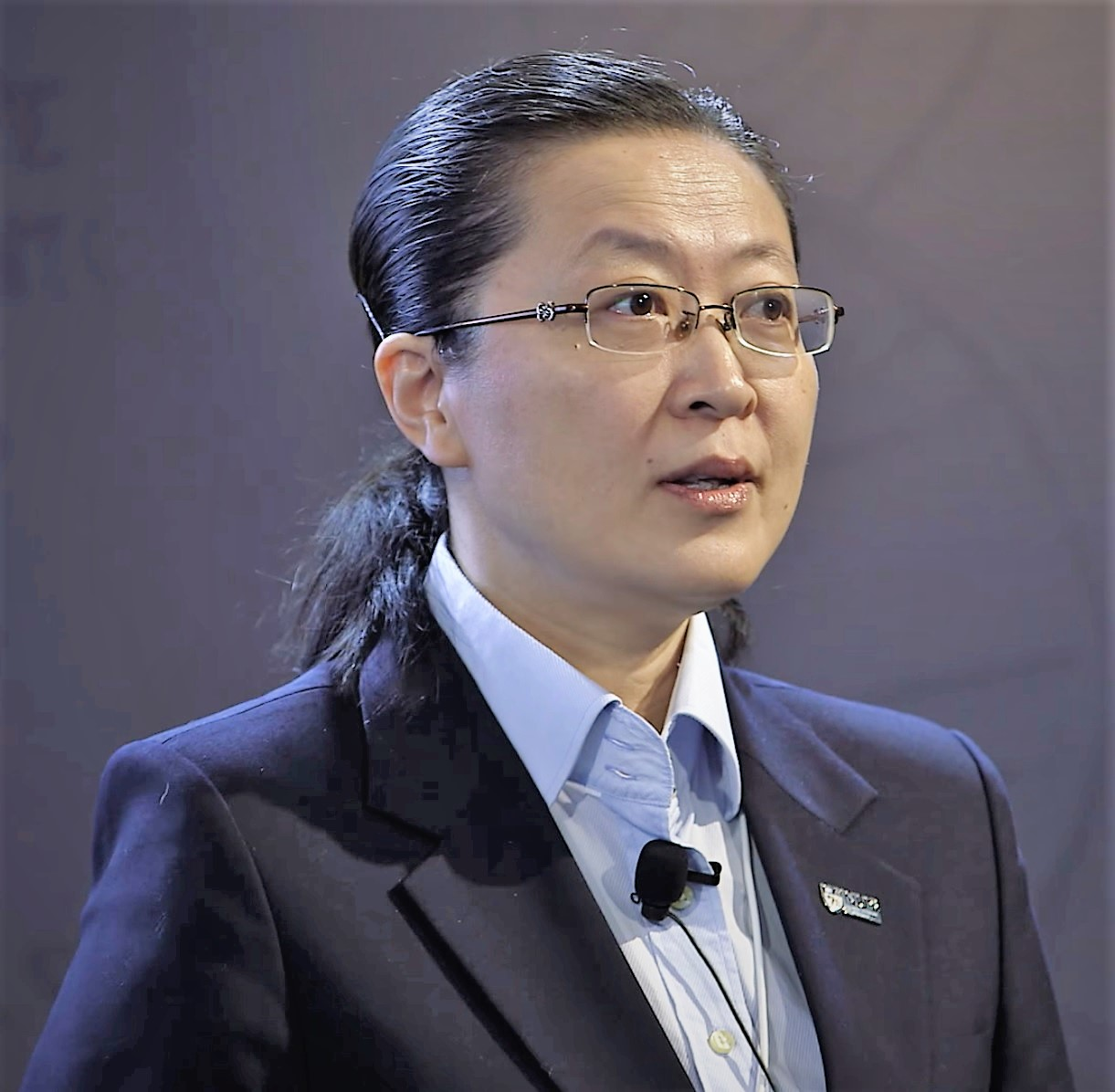
- Liu Bin at the World Economic Forum in 2019
- Education: National University of Singapore; Nanjing University
- Scientific career
- Workplaces: National University of Singapore; University of California, Santa Barbara

Bin Liu is a chemist who is Professor and Provost's Chair at the National University of Singapore. Her research considers polymer chemistry and organic functional materials. She was appointed Vice President of Research and Technology in 2019. She was awarded the 2021 Royal Society of Chemistry Centenary Prize. She was the Senior Vice Provost (Faculty & Institutional Development) from 2022 to 2023. Currently, she is the Deputy President of Research and Technology.

== Early life and education ==
Liu was encouraged to study science by her parents. She was trained in organic chemistry at Nanjing University, before moving to the National University of Singapore for graduate studies. Her doctoral research involved water-soluble conjugated polymers for organic electronic devices. At first, she struggled to successfully synthesise polymers, but she mastered it after one year. She eventually moved to the University of California, Santa Barbara, where she worked as a postdoctoral researcher on the development and application of conjugated polyelectrolyte nanoparticles for biomedicine. In 2005 she returned to Singapore to start her professorship at the National University of Singapore.

== Research and career ==
Liu is a professor at the National University of Singapore. Her early work considered novel materials for high efficiency solar cells. In particular, she focused on the design of hole transport materials and interpenetrating organic/inorganic networks. To ensure compatibility with multi-layer device fabrication protocols, Liu concentrated on the design of materials that are soluble in water and alcohols. In 2011, she started working on biocompatible luminogens which demonstrate aggregation-induced emission. Such materials are non-emissive as dilute solutions but can assemble into intensely emissive aggregates. They can serve as highly sensitive light-up molecular probes, which allow for the non-invasive tracking of analytes and biological processes in real-time. In 2014 she formed a spin-out company, Luminicell, which commercialises this technology.

During the COVID-19 pandemic, Liu moved her laboratory-based work online. She made use of machine learning to accelerate materials design. The algorithms created by Liu can predict the properties of particular molecular structures, and had screened several million molecules by the end of 2020. The machine learning models can evaluate structure-property relationships, allowing for the prediction of optical and electronic properties.

Liu was awarded the Royal Society of Chemistry Centenary Prize in recognition of her work in organic materials and nanomaterials.

== Awards and honours ==
- 2008 National Science and Technology Young Scientist Award
- 2011 L'Oréal-UNESCO For Women in Science Award
- 2014 World Scientific Most Influential Scientific Minds
- 2016 President's Technology Award
- 2018 Clarivate Highly Cited Researchers
- 2019 American Chemical Society Nano Lectureship Award
- 2020 Elected Fellow of the Singapore National Academy of Science
- 2021 Royal Society of Chemistry Centenary Prize
- 2023, 2024 and 2025 Asian Scientist 100, Asian Scientist

== Selected publications ==
- Lioz Etgar; Peng Gao; Zhaosheng Xue; Qin Peng; Aravind Kumar Chandiran; Bin Liu; Md K Nazeeruddin; Michael Grätzel (11 October 2012). "Mesoscopic CH3NH3PbI3/TiO2 heterojunction solar cells". Journal of the American Chemical Society. 134 (42): 17396–17399. doi:10.1021/ja307789s. ISSN 0002-7863. PMID 23043296. Wikidata Q57348961.
- Dan Ding; Kai Li; Bin Liu; Ben Zhong Tang (6 June 2013). "Bioprobes based on AIE fluorogens". Accounts of Chemical Research. 46 (11): 2441–2453. doi:10.1021/ar3003464. ISSN 0001-4842. PMID 23742638. Wikidata Q38112482.
- Kai Li; Bin Liu (1 September 2014). "Polymer-encapsulated organic nanoparticles for fluorescence and photoacoustic imaging". Chemical Society Reviews. 43 (18): 6570–6597. doi:10.1039/c4cs00014e. ISSN 0306-0012. PMID 24792930. Wikidata Q30813719.
