= Charles J. Pedersen =

American organic chemist (1904–1989)

Charles John Pedersen 安井 良男
- Born: October 3, 1904; Busan, Korean Empire
- Died: October 26, 1989 (aged 85); Salem, New Jersey, U.S.
- Education: University of Dayton, Massachusetts Institute of Technology
- Known for: Discovery of crown ethers Development of metal deactivators
- Awards: Nobel Prize in Chemistry (1987)
- Scientific career
- Fields: Organic chemistry
- Workplaces: DuPont

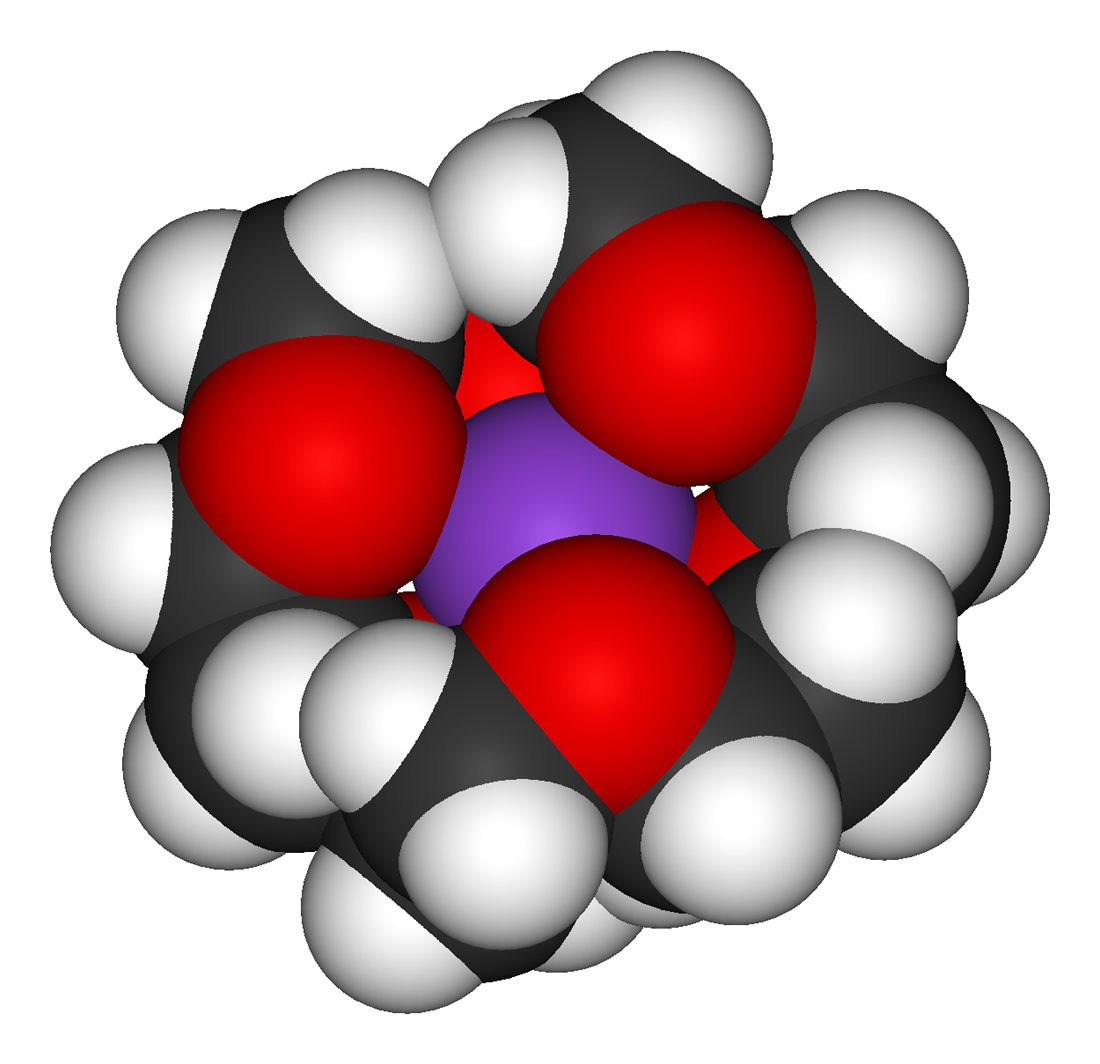
Crown ether coordinating a potassium ion

Charles John Pedersen (Japanese: 安井 良男, Yasui Yoshio, October 3, 1904 – October 26, 1989) was an American organic chemist best known for discovering crown ethers and describing methods of synthesizing them during his entire 42-year career as a chemist for DuPont at DuPont Experimental Station in Wilmington, Delaware, and at DuPont's Jackson Laboratory in Deepwater, New Jersey. Often associated with Reed McNeil Izatt, Pedersen also shared the Nobel Prize in Chemistry in 1987 with Donald J. Cram and Jean-Marie Lehn. He is one of three Nobel Prize laureates born in Korea, along with Peace Prize laureate Kim Dae-jung and Literature laureate Han Kang.

Pedersen made many other discoveries in chemistry, such as discovering and developing metal deactivators. His early investigations also led to the development of a dramatically improved process for manufacturing tetraethyl lead, an important gasoline additive. He also contributed to the development of neoprene.

== Early life and education ==
Born on October 3, 1904, in Busan, Korea, Charles J. Pedersen was the youngest of three children. His father, Brede Pedersen, was a Norwegian marine engineer who immigrated to Korea in order to join the Korean customs service after leaving home due to family issues. Later, he worked as a mechanical engineer at the Unsan County mines in present-day North Korea. His Japanese mother, Takino Yasui, immigrated from Japan to Korea with her family and established a successful line of work by trading soybeans and silkworms located close to the Unsan County mines, where the couple ultimately met. Although not much is mentioned about his elder brother, who died in childhood shortly before Pedersen was born, he had an older sister named Astrid, who was five years older than him. In Japan, he used the Japanese given name Yoshio (良男), which he spelled using the kanji for "good" and "man". According to Pedersen in a separate autobiographical account of his childhood, he had been born prior to the Russo-Japanese War and because his mother had still been grieving over the then-recent death of his older brother, he did not feel welcomed as a child.

Despite living in what is now North Korea, because Pedersen lived in the vicinity of the American-owned Unsan County mines, which spanned approximately 500 square miles in area, he grew up speaking primarily English.

At around 8 years old, Pedersen was sent by his family to study abroad in Nagasaki, Japan and then later transferred to St. Joseph College in Yokohama, Japan.

After successfully completing his education at St. Joseph College, due to the close ties his family had with the Society of Mary (Marianists), Pedersen decided to attend college in America at the University of Dayton in Ohio.

While spending his undergraduate life in 1922 studying chemical engineering at the University of Dayton in Ohio, Pedersen had been a well balanced student who immersed himself in the sports, academic and social aspects of his college. With a passion for the sport of tennis, Pedersen played on his school's varsity tennis team under Coach Frank Kronauge, a former University of Dayton tennis captain. Playing for all four years of his undergraduate years, Pedersen became captain for both of his junior and senior seasons on the team. Furthermore, Pedersen spent his time as both the vice-president of the Engineers' Club as well as in charge of Literary in the Daytonian Editorial Department^{.} Graduating from the University of Dayton in 1926 with a degree in chemical engineering, he was dedicated for his time at the university as well as the various accomplishments he made while studying as an undergraduate.

Earning a bachelor's degree in chemical engineering, Pedersen decided to attend the Massachusetts Institute of Technology in order to obtain a master's degree in organic chemistry. Although his professors at the time encouraged him to stay and pursue a PhD in organic chemistry, Pedersen decided to start his career instead, partially because he no longer wanted to be supported by his father. He is one of the few people to win a Nobel Prize in the sciences without having a PhD.

=== Du Pont ===
After leaving the Massachusetts Institute of Technology, Pedersen became employed at the DuPont Company in Wilmington, Delaware, in 1927 through connections from his research advisor, Professor James F. Norris. While at DuPont, Pedersen was able to begin research at the Jackson Laboratory under William S. Calcott and finished his career with DuPont at the Experimental Station in Wilmington, Delaware. As a young chemist at DuPont, Pedersen witnessed and gained inspiration many flourishing chemists such as Julian Hill and Roy J. Plunkett, and also breakthroughs in polymers and work in the field of organic chemistry. Pedersen had a particular interest in industry as he started his focus on his chemical career, which influenced the direction of problems he set out to solve as a chemist. As Pedersen began working on problems as a new chemist, he was free to work on whatever problems fascinated him and he quickly became interested in oxidative degradation and stabilization of substrate. Pedersen's papers and work expanded beyond this, however it was a major influence to his eventual Nobel Prize awarded research.

Retiring at the age of 65, his work resulted in 25 papers and 65 patents, and in 1967, Pedersen published two works describing the methods of synthesizing crown ethers (cyclic polyethers). The donut-shaped molecules were the first in a series of extraordinary compounds that form stable structures with alkali metal ions. In 1987, he shared the Nobel Prize in Chemistry for his work in this area with Donald Cram and Jean-Marie Lehn, whom expanded upon his original discoveries. In the whole process of the Nobel Prize winning, the Dupont Company fully supported Pedersen by providing him a full-time public relations man, and a part-time secretary. DuPont Company also utilized their own corporate aircraft to accompany Pedersen and his family, as he could not travel on commercial aircraft.

== Discovery of the crown ethers ==
At around 1960, Pedersen went back to research in the field of Coordination Chemistry, focusing on the synthesis of multidentate ligands. It was recommended by his colleague Herman Schroeder to work on the coordination chemistry of vanadium before working on the polymerization and oxidative catalytic activity of vanadium. It was while working on this research that Pedersen made his discovery of crown ether. While studying the synthesis of bis[2-(o-hydroxyphenoxy)ethyl] ether, Pedersen accidentally discovered an unknown substances described as a "goo" while purifying the compound. Using ultraviolet–visible spectroscopy to study its reactions with phenol groups, after treating the samples with alkali, although the absorption curve initially showed no changes, it was observed to have shifted to higher absorption readings if one or more of the hydroxy groups were unpaired. Basing further research on this observation, Pedersen then dipped the unknown product in methanol and sodium hydroxide. Although the solution was not soluble in methanol, it became alkaline when in contact with the sodium hydroxide.

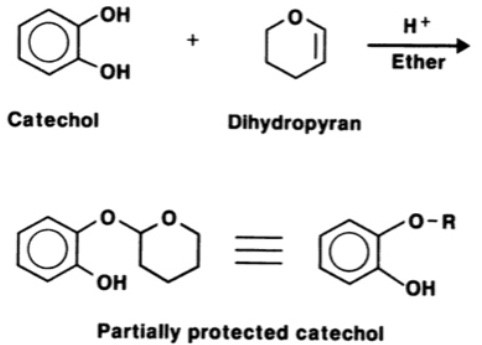

Due to not being soluble in methanol, Pedersen then proceeded to treat the methanol with soluble sodium salts, to which the unknown substance became soluble, allowing him to conclude that the solubility was due to sodium ions instead of alkalinity. Since the behavior of this substance mirrored that of 2,3-benzo-1,4,7-trioxacyclononane, with twice the molecular-weight, the unknown molecule was then coined as dibenzo-18-crown-6, the first of the aromatic crown compounds discovered.

== Associations with other chemists ==
=== Reed M. Izatt ===
In 1968 Izatt was on a train ride home when he stopped in Chicago to meet with the physiologist George Eisenman who informed Izatt about Pedersen's paper on crown ethers published only months earlier. Izatt was looking forward to the possibilities of studying these crown ethers with his thermionic titration technique. Izatt called Pedersen and was the first scientist not at DuPont to meet with Pedersen about his discovery and Pedersen supplied him with a sample of his new crown ether compound. Izatt's work on molecular recognition was greatly influenced by his interaction with Pedersen. In Izatt's last visit with Pedersen prior to his death in 1988 he found a personal letter written by Pedersen that stated, "Most men achieve 'Immortality' through their progeny. I have no child of my own. Possibly, the crown ethers will serve, in a small way, to mark my footprint on earth" and Izatt believing this too shares Pedersen's message.

=== Donald J. Cram ===
Cram shared the 1987 Nobel Prize in Chemistry with Pedersen but expanding on Pedersen's monumental discovery in macrocyclic chemistry of crown ethers. Pedersen's work was in two-dimensional structures but Cram was able to synthesize similar molecules in three-dimensional space. Cram's synthesis of these three-dimensional molecules provided large gains in the production of enzymes made in labs as these structures have selectivity based on complementary structures.

=== Jean-Marie Lehn ===
Lehn was the other scientist who shared the Nobel Prize in Chemistry with Pedersen and was fundamental in starting the field of Supramolecular chemistry. Lehn's work specifically identified in his recognition for the Nobel Prize was in his work on cryptands.

== Miscellaneous research ==
Although minimal research has been conducted on this compound, Pedersen observed that it had potential to work as a deactivator for copper. Nevertheless, it was the first of the many metal deactivators, which function by converting an inactive complex from an otherwise catalytic metal ion.

== Personal life ==
Pedersen was married to Susan J. Ault in 1947 and the couple then moved to Salem, New Jersey, where they resided until Ault died on February 8, 1983, at 72 years old. Pedersen was diagnosed with myeloma in 1983, and though he was becoming increasingly frail, he traveled to Stockholm to accept the Nobel Prize in late 1987. Shortly thereafter, he was awarded a medal for excellence by the DuPont Research Fellows. He died on 26 October 1989 in Salem, New Jersey.

== Legacy ==
Following Pedersen's breakthrough in realizing his accidental product and structure of dibenzo-18-crown-6, huge advancements have been made in the fields of macrocyclic and supramolecular chemistry. Pedersen devoted the rest of his research career to studying these molecules and started one of the largest growths recently seen in a specific field of chemistry. This growth in Pedersen's field of work following his momentous discovery for macrocyclic compounds can be seen in the work of the 2016 Nobel Prize winner in Chemistry for molecular motors where Pedersen's work allowed for the insight in how to create the molecular specific structures. The molecular machines were recognized as the focus of the 2016 Nobel Prize Winners, which were produced by connecting molecules to various molecular rings.

== Publications ==
- Pedersen, Charles J (1988). "The Discovery of Crown Ethers". Science. 241 (4865): 536–540. Bibcode:1988Sci...241..536P. doi:10.1126/science.241.4865.536. PMID 17774576.
- Pedersen, Charles J (1967). "Cyclic polyethers and their complexes with metal salts". Journal of the American Chemical Society. 89 (10): 2495–2496. Bibcode:1967JAChS..89.2495P. doi:10.1021/ja00986a052.
