= Seiji Shinkai =

Japanese chemist

- 新海 征治
- Born: July 5, 1944 (age 82); Fukuoka Prefecture
- Education: Kyushu University
- Awards: Chemical Society of Japan Award (2003); Daiwa Adrian Prize (2013); Clarivate Citation Laureates (2013); Order of the Sacred Treasure (2017); Person of Cultural Merit (2018)

Seiji Shinkai (新海 征治, Shinkai Seiji; born July 5, 1944) is a Japanese chemist and professor of Kyushu University, and emeritus professor.

== Early life ==
Shinkai was born in Fukuoka prefecture, Japan, in 1944. He completed his B.S. in 1967 and Ph.D. in 1972 from Kyushu University.

== Career and research ==
He is known for his pioneering research in molecular self-assembly. Molecular self-assembly is the assembly of molecules without guidance or management from an outside source.

His main field of expertise and research interests are Host Guest Chemistry, Molecular Recognition, Liquid Crystals/Organic Gelators, Sugar Sensing/Sugar-Based Combinatorial Chemistry, Boronic-acids, Polysaccharide-Polynucleotide Interactions, Sol-Gel Transcription and Inorganic Combinatorial Chemistry. His most recent research is related to chiral discrimination using AIE.

In 1979 he published the first light driven molecular machine in Tetrahedron Letters.

To date (July 2019) he has published over 1024 original paper and 219 reviews and books.

== Recognition ==
- The Chemical Society of Japan Progress Award (1978)
- Izatt-Christensen International Award in (1998)
- Becker Lecture Award (1999)
- Vielberth Lectureship Award (2002)
- The Chemical Society of Japan Award (2003)
- Western Japan Culture Prize (2004)
- Toray Science and Technology Prize (2006)
- Daiwa Adrian Prize (2013)
- Clarivate Citation Laureates (2013)
- Molecular Sensors & Molecular Logic Gates (MSMLG) Award (2014)
- Received the Order of the Sacred Treasure from the Emperor of Japan in 2017.
- Received the Person of Cultural Merit from the Japanese Government in 2018.
