= Kim Kimoon =

South Korean chemist (born 1954)

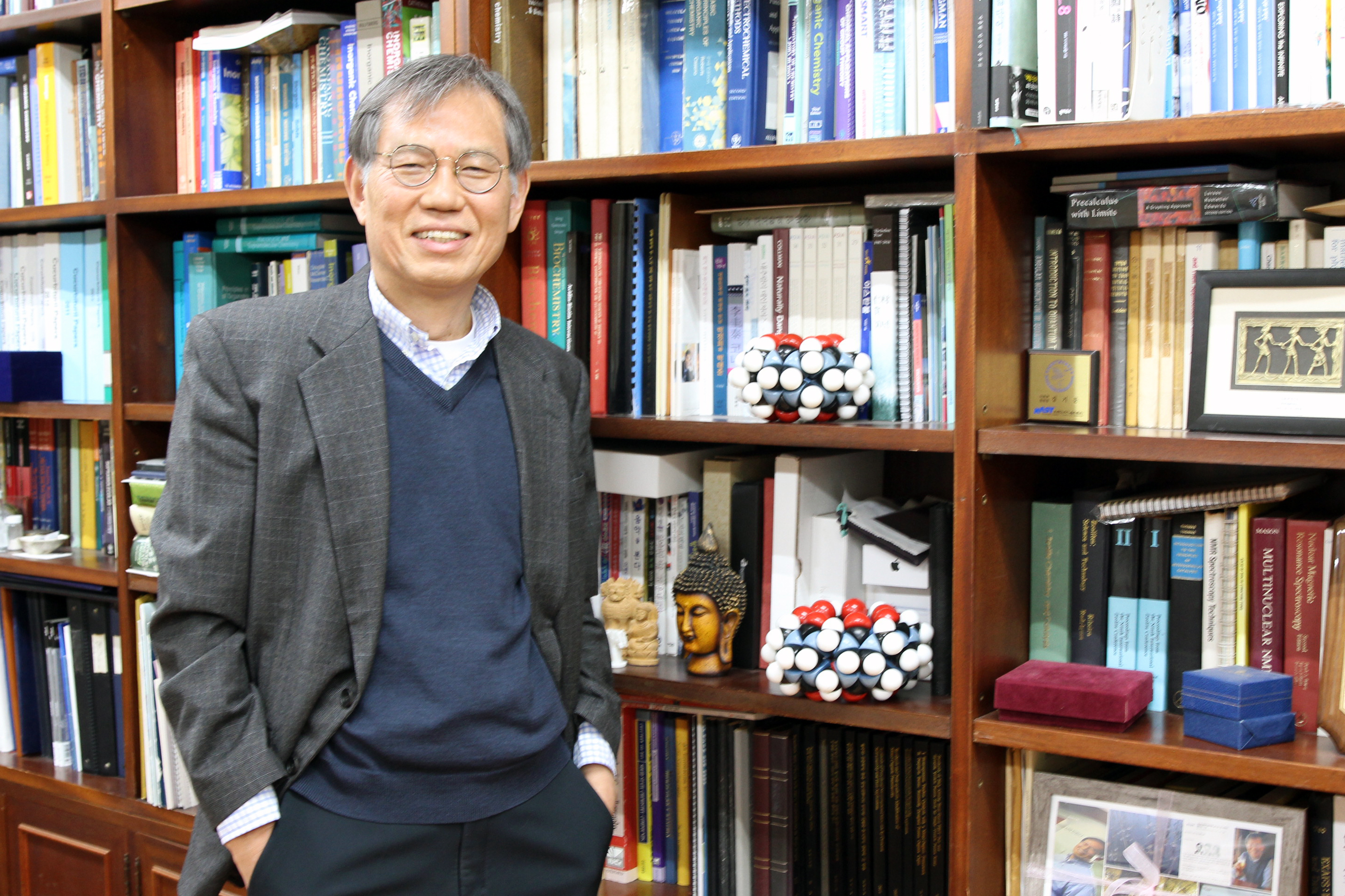
- Kimoon in 2009
- Born: 1954 (age 71–72); Seoul, South Korea
- Education: Seoul National University (BS, 1977); Korea Advanced Institute of Science and Technology (MS, 1979); Stanford University (PhD, 1986)
- Known for: Supramolecular chemistry, self-assembly, cucurbituril, metal-organic framework
- Awards: Izatt-Christensen Award (2012); Top Scientist and Technologist Award of Korea (2008); Ho-Am Prize (2006)
- Scientific career
- Fields: Chemistry
- Workplaces: Pohang University of Science and Technology, Institute for Basic Science
- Thesis: Electrocatalytic four-electron reduction of dioxygen by metalloporphyrin adsorbed on graphite (1986)
- Doctoral advisors: James P. Collman, Mu Shik Jon

Korean name
- Hangul: 김기문
- Hanja: 金基文
- RR: Gim Gimun
- MR: Kim Kimun
- Website: Center for Self-assembly and Complexity

Kim Kimoon (Korean: 김기문; born 1954) is a South Korean chemist and professor in the Department of Chemistry at Pohang University of Science and Technology (POSTECH). He is the first and current director of the Center for Self-assembly and Complexity at the Institute for Basic Science. Kim has authored or coauthored 300 papers which have been cited more than 30,000 times and he holds a number of patents. His work has been published in Nature, Nature Chemistry, Angewandte Chemie, and JACS, among others. He has been a Clarivate Analytics Highly Cited Researcher in the field of chemistry in 2014, 2015, 2016.

His research has focused on developing novel functional materials and devices based on supramolecular chemistry. In particular, his research group has worked on a various functional materials based on cucurbiturils (CB[n]s), pumpkin-shaped macrocyclic molecules, and metal-organic porous materials for catalysis, separation, and gas storage. His discovery and isolation of new members of the CB[n] family reported in 2000 had a major impact in expanding the field. Additionally, his paper published in Nature in 2000, which reported the synthesis of homochiral nanoporous crystalline materials using self-assembly and an application for a chiral catalyst, is notable as it was placed among 35 top notable chemical related papers published in Nature from 1950 to 2000. His research has been recognized by a number of awards, including the Izatt-Christensen Award in 2012.

== Education ==
Kim received his BS degree from Seoul National University in 1977, MS degree from Korea Advanced Institute of Science and Technology (KAIST) in 1979 under Prof. Mu Shik Jon, and Ph.D. degree from Stanford University in 1986 under Prof. James P. Collman. After graduating, he did two years of postdoctoral work at Northwestern University under Prof. James A. Ibers.

== Career ==
Kim started his academic career at the Department of Chemistry at POSTECH in 1988, where he is now a Distinguished University Professor (POSTECH Fellow). In 1997, Kim was appointed director of the Center for Smart Supramolecules supported by the Creative Research Initiatives program under the Korean Ministry of Education, Science and Technology (MEST). He later founded the Division of Advanced Materials Science in POSTECH, launched in 2008 with support from the World Class University Project. On August 1, 2012, he was named founding director of the Center for Self-assembly and Complexity (CSC) under the Institute for Basic Science (IBS). The center focuses on non-equilibrium self-assembly, molecular recognition in complex systems, and emergent materials.

=== Cucurbiturils ===
Cucurbiturils were first synthesized in 1905 by Robert Behrend, by condensing glycoluril with formaldehyde, but their structure was not elucidated until 1981. The field expanded as cucurbituril homologues CB5, CB7, and CB8 were discovered and isolated by Kim Kimoon in 2000, which laid the foundation for the development of cucurbituril-based chemistry and supramolecular chemistry. Cucurbituril homologues display unique chemical properties as macrocyclic host molecules with exceptionally high binding affinities, and they have found use in host-guest chemistry and formation of supramolecular structures/assembly. This brought more attention to the field, allowing CB10 and CB14 to later be discovered. The first CB-dedicated workshop was held in Maryland in 2007 with support from National Science Foundation which paved the way for the International Conference on Cucurbiturils to be been held every two years from 2009 which was first organized by Kim and hosted at POSTECH. His research on supermolecular chemistry, especially his work on cucurbituril, led him to receive the Izatt-Christensen Award. In 2018, Kim co-authored the first textbook on cucurbiturils.

=== Metal-organic framework ===
Kim has also focused his research on multifunctional modular porous materials, such as metal-organic frameworks and porous organic cages. Using an enantiopure organic building block and metal ion, his team was able to synthesize a homochiral metal–organic porous material, POST-1, and demonstrate that it works as a chiral catalyst. his group contributed to the development of the modular porous materials field by demonstrating synthetic methodologies and applications. The team later designed and synthesized porphyrin boxes, a new class of porous organic cages consisting of porphyrins. Porphyrin boxes have been applied as a synthetic ion channel, electrochemical catalysis, and construction of hierarchical superstructures.

=== Self-assembly via irreversible covalent bonds ===
Unlike conventional nanostructures built by reversible interactions/bonds, Kim discovered that the irreversible thiol-ene polymerization of rigid, disk-shaped building blocks resulted in robust hollow polymer nanocapsules with a narrow size distribution. He was able to control the size, shape, property and functionality of the nanostructured materials, including spheres, film, toroids, and tubular structures. They have applications in therapeutics, catalysis, separation, and electronics. The research demonstrated an alternate route for construction of nanostructured materials with specific morphology via self-assembly.

== Awards ==
- 1995: Yonam Fellowship, Yonam Foundation
- 1997: Best Paper Award, Korean Federation of Science and Technology Societies
- 1998: Outstanding Research Award, Division of Inorganic Chemistry, Korean Chemical Society
- 1999: Distinguished Research Award, Korean Chemical Society, Korean Chemical Society
- 2000: Korean Academy of Science and Technology, elected member
- 2000: Scientist of the Month, Ministry of Science and ICT
- 2001: Korea Science Award, Ministry of Science and ICT and National Research Foundation of Korea
- 2001: Doyak Medal, the Order of Science & Technology Merit, Korean Government
- 2002: TWAS Prize, Third World Academy of Sciences
- 2002: Korea Science Prize, Korean Government
- 2003: Korean Academy of Science and Technology, elected Fellow
- 2005: Visiting Professorship, University of Strasbourg
- 2006: Named as a Role Model Scientist, Ministry of Science and Technology
- 2006: Ho-Am Prize in Science, Hoam Foundation, Samsung
- 2007: Prime Minister Prize, Science Innovation Section, NANO KOREA Awards
- 2007: Named as an Outstanding Scientist in 2008, Ministry of Science and Technology
- 2008: Top Scientist and Technologist Award of Korea, Korean Federation of Science and Technology Societies
- 2009: POSTECH Fellow, elected
- 2009: Proud Postechian Award, POSTECH
- 2011: 100 Leaders in Korea, The Dong-A Ilbo
- 2011: E. Muetterties Memorial Lectureship Award, University of California, Berkeley
- 2012: Honorary Doctorate, Siberian Branch of the Russian Academy of Sciences
- 2012: Izatt-Christensen Award
- 2014: Knowledge Creation Award, Ministry of Science, ICT and Future Planning

== Memberships ==
- 2016 – present Accounts of Chemical Research Editorial Advisory Board member
- 2008 – 2015 Angewandte Chemie, International Advisory Board member
- 2006 – present Nano, Editorial Board member
- 2006 – 2012 ChemComm, Editorial Advisory Board member
- 2006 – present Chemistry-An Asian Journal, Editorial Advisory Board member
- 2006 – 2009 CrystEngComm, Editorial Advisory Board member
- 2002 – present Supramolecular Chemistry, Editorial Advisory Board member
- 2002 – 2009 Bulletin of the Korean Chemical Society, Associate Editor
- 2000 – present Korean Academy of Science and Technology, member
- 2000 – 2004 Dalton Transactions, International Advisory Editorial Board member
- 1998 – 2004 Crystal Engineering, Editorial Advisory Board member
- 1988 – present Korean Chemical Society, Member
- 1983 – present American Chemical Society, Member

== See also ==
- Young-Tae Chang
