= Hilary Godwin =

American biochemist

Hilary Arnold Godwin
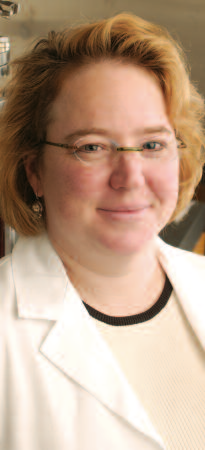
- Godwin on cover of Findings magazine, National Institute of General Medical Sciences, in 2005
- Born: Hilary Joan Arnold; December 1, 1967 (age 58)
- Education: University of Chicago; Stanford University
- Scientific career
- Workplaces: University of California, Los Angeles; Northwestern University; University of Washington
- Thesis: The first general synthetic method for preparing compounds containing heterometallic bonds; synthesis and characterization of unprecedented mixed triad heterometallic multiple bonds (1994)
- Doctoral advisor: James P. Collman

Hilary Joan Arnold Godwin (born December 1, 1967) is a professor in the Department of Environmental and Occupational Health Sciences at the University of Washington and the dean of the School of Public Health. Godwin studies the biochemistry of lead and how to diminish the impact of climate change on public health.

== Early life and education ==
Godwin's father, stepfather and stepmother were all herpetologists. Her mother studied ants and became a biology teacher. She was inspired to become a scientist by her family and Jane Goodall, a primatologist who studied chimpanzee behaviour in the 1960s. She spent her summer holidays hiking in the mountains of Northern California. Godwin trained in chemistry and biophysics. She earned an undergraduate degree in chemistry at the University of Chicago in 1989, where she was part of the Phi Beta Kappa honor society. She moved to Stanford University for her doctoral degree in physical chemistry, which she completed in 1994. She was a National Institutes of Health Fellow at Johns Hopkins University. Whilst at Johns Hopkins University Godwin researched how lead can interact with RNA, causing learning difficulties and behavioural issues.

== Research and career ==
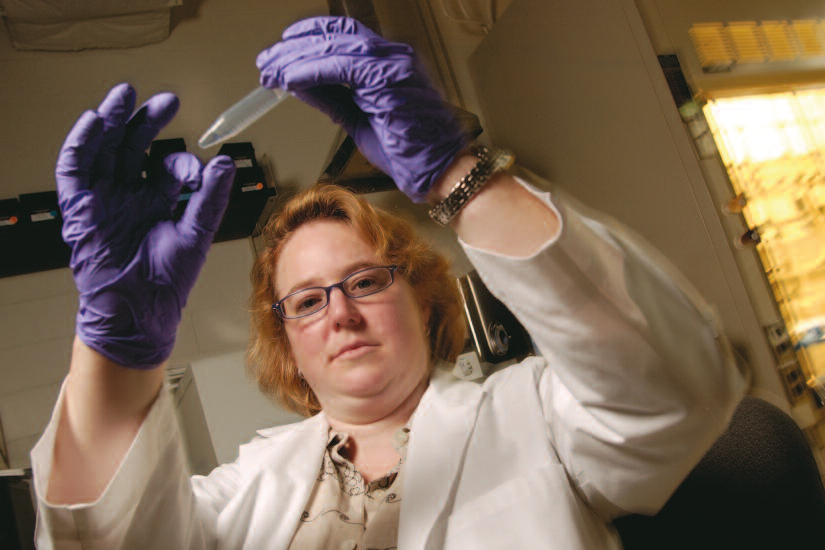
Godwin studies lead poisoning in 2005

Godwin started her academic career at Northwestern University. She was the first woman to be hired into a tenure-track position, and in 2004 was the first woman to be made chair of the chemistry department. She was made a Howard Hughes Medical Institute Professor in 2002. Whilst at Northwestern University she began research into lead poisoning, and particularly how it impacts children. At the time Godwin lived in Evanston, Illinois, an area that was labelled as a high risk for lead poisoning. In the collar counties of Chicago, houses were built before the federal government of the United States passed a law banning lead paint. Godwin became concerned about the levels of lead in her family home, and particularly the risk that her son would suffer from lead poisoning. She studied the coordination chemistry of lead in water, and how lead is transported and survives inside the human body.

She demonstrated that lead interferes with the ability of a protein to turn genes on and off. She showed that the mechanism by which lead modifies the function of proteins occurs through the displacement of zinc and calcium. Zinc displacement results in the protein changing shape, which impacts the protein's ability to function. This observation is of particular relevance for understanding how lead poisoning impacts children, as zinc binding proteins are of important in child development. Zinc displacement in biologically important proteins can also impact the blood pressure of adults and fertility of men. Meanwhile, calcium displacement by lead can modify the transfer of nerve impulses.

She joined the faculty at University of California, Los Angeles in 2006. Godwin acted as associate dean in the UCLA Fielding School of Public Health from 2008 to 2011 and again from 2014 to 2018.

In 2018, Godwin was elected dean of the University of Washington School of Public Health, and started the position on July 15. In this capacity she has led open public health forums, including discussions about the relationship between public health and homelessness, and connected various stakeholders to the University of Washington Population Health Initiative.

=== Academic service ===
Whilst at Northwestern University Godwin was awarded $1 million from the Howard Hughes Medical Institute program to support students move between high school and college. At the time, only 1% of the faculty in the United States' Top 50 chemistry departments was African American. Godwin created the Minority Success in Science program, which connected community public health groups, local health organisations and school groups. She was particularly involved with initiatives that assessed lead poisoning in Chicago's soils, which inspired her focus her research in public health.

=== Awards and honours ===
Her awards and honours include:

- 1996 The Camille and Henry Dreyfus Foundation New Faculty Award
- 1998 Burroughs-Wellcome Foundation Toxicology Investigator Award
- 1999 National Science Foundation CAREER Awards
- 2000 Alfred P. Sloan Foundation Fellowship
- 2000 Camille Dreyfus Award

=== Selected publications ===
Her publications include:

- Godwin, Hilary Arnold (2001-04-01). "The biological chemistry of lead". Current Opinion in Chemical Biology. 5 (2): 223–227. doi:10.1016/S1367-5931(00)00194-0. PMID 11282351.
- Godwin, Hilary Arnold (2000-01-12). "A Selective, Ratiometric Fluorescent Sensor for Pb^{2+}". Journal of the American Chemical Society. 122 (1): 174–175. Bibcode:2000JAChS.122..174D. doi:10.1021/ja992238x.
- Godwin, Hilary Arnold (1997). "Lessons from zinc-binding peptides". Annual Review of Biophysics and Biomolecular Structure. 26: 357–371. doi:10.1146/annurev.biophys.26.1.357. PMID 9241423.
