= Ilya Moiseev =

Soviet Russian chemist (1929–2020)

- Илья Моисеев
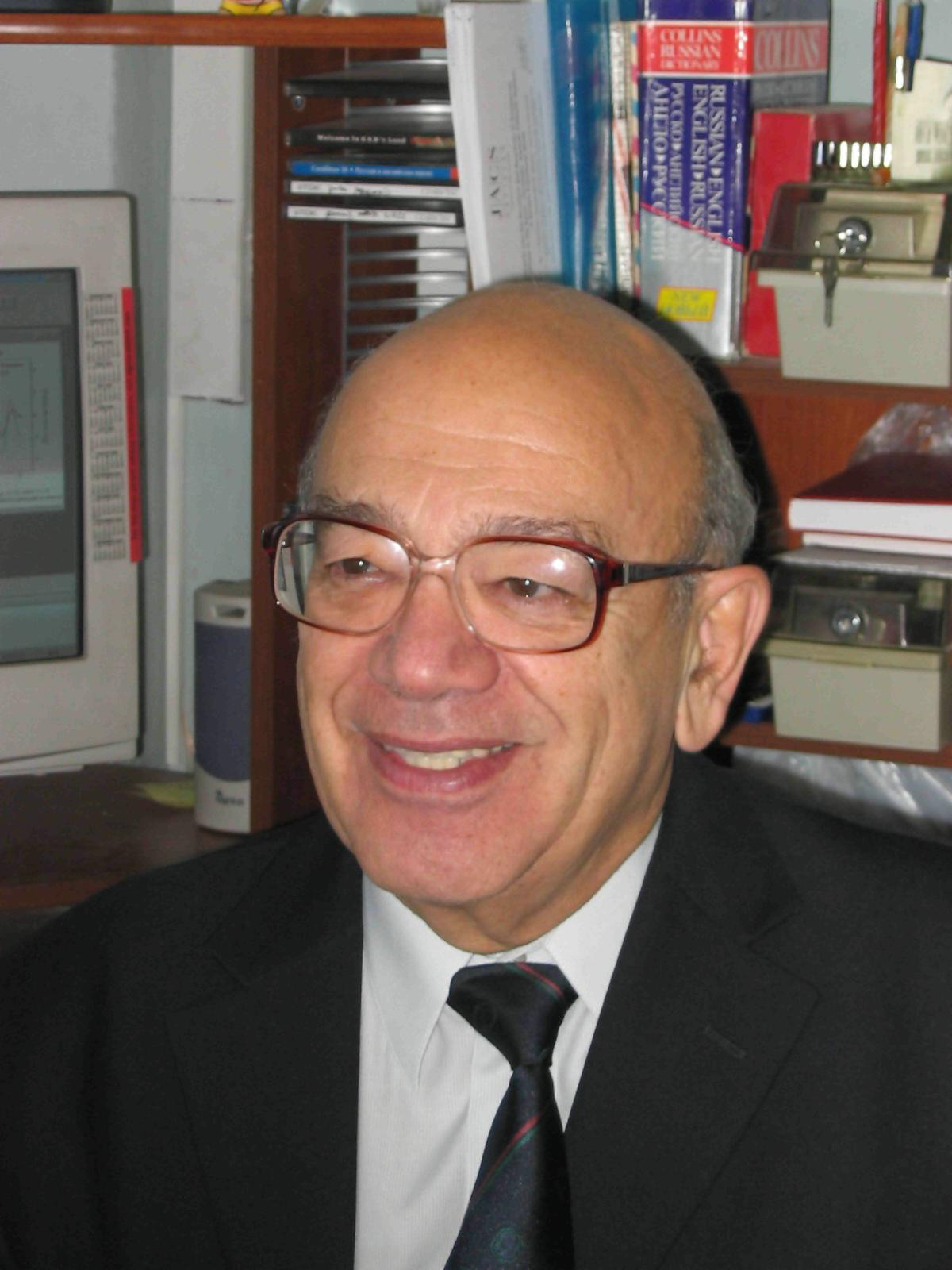
- Moiseev in 2009
- Born: Ilya Iosifovich Moiseev; 15 March 1929; Moscow, RSFSR, Soviet Union
- Died: 10 October 2020 (aged 91); Moscow, Russia
- Citizenship: USSR, Russia
- Education: MITHT (1952; PhD 1967)
- Known for: metal-complex catalysis
- Awards: Centenary Prize (2006); Demidov Prize (2012); Chugaev Prize (2012); Mendeleev Medal (2013)
- Scientific career
- Fields: chemistry
- Workplaces: IGIC RAS (1963-); RGUNG Gubkin (2003-)
- Thesis: Research in the field of chemistry of π-complexes of palladium (1967)

Ilya Iosifovich Moiseev (Russian: Илья Иосифович Моисеев; 15 March 1929 – 10 October 2020) was a Soviet and Russian chemist. An expert in both kinetics and the coordination chemistry of transition metals, he made significant advances in metal-complex catalysis.

== Biography ==
Moiseev was born in Moscow. He studied organic chemistry at Moscow State University of Fine Chemical Technologies (MITHT). After graduating in 1952, his first jobs were as an engineer, a junior researcher in physical chemistry, then a senior researcher in organic chemistry. From 1963, he worked at the N. S. Kurnakov Institute of General and Inorganic Chemistry (IGIC) of the Russian Academy of Sciences (RAS), Moscow, as head of the laboratory of metal-complex catalysis and coordination chemistry. From 2003 onward, he was a professor at the Gubkin Russian State University of Oil and Gas (RGUNG Gubkin).

He also served as chairman of the Scientific Council for Gas Chemistry, RAS, and vice-president of the Russian Chemical Society.

== Research ==
By developing new principles for the design of catalytic systems he created highly efficient catalysts that enabled compounds of commercial importance to be synthesized from cheap hydrocarbons. His concerns for efficiency and choice of raw materials were informed by environmental as well as economic considerations. His innovations became the basis of industrial methods for the production of acetaldehyde from ethylene, the synthesis of formic acid from carbon monoxide and water, the hydrogenation of oxygen to hydrogen peroxide, and the synthesis of isoprene. He discovered Palladium catalysts that have selective effects under mild conditions, and synthesized new classes of inorganic compounds.

Possibly his most famous discovery was the Pd(II)-catalyzed acetoxlyation of ethylene to vinyl acetate in 1960, which has become known as Moiseev's reaction. The reaction proceeds only in the presence of sodium acetate; Moiseev used benzoquinone to regenerate the Pd(II) catalyst.

CH_{2}=CH_{2} + 2 CH_{3}COONa + PdCl_{2} ⟶ CH_{2}=CHOOCCH_{3} + 2 NaCl + Pd + CH_{3}COOH

== Honours and awards ==
In 2002, he received the State Prize of the Russian Federation in the field of science and technology. In 2011 he was awarded the Prize of the Government of the Russian Federation in the field of science and technology. He also received the Orders of the Red Banner of Labour (1986), Honour (1999) and Friendship (2009).

The Royal Society of Chemistry awarded Moiseev the Centenary Prize for 2006/7. In 2012, he was awarded the Demidov Prize for his contribution to the chemistry of organoelement compounds, petrochemistry, and carbene chemistry, and the RAS Chugaev Prize for his work on coordination compounds in industrially important redox reactions. In 2013 he received the RAS Mendeleev Medal for outstanding work in the field of catalysis and energy-saving technologies.

He became a corresponding member of the Academy of Sciences of the Soviet Union in 1990, and an academician of the Russian Academy of Sciences in 1992. He was a full member of the Academy of Sciences, Arts and Literature in Paris, the European Academy of Sciences and Arts, and the Academia Europaea.

== Bibliography ==
- Moiseev, I. I.; Vargaftik, M.; Syrhim, Y. K. (1960). "About the mechanism of the reaction between palladium and alkenes in hydroxyl containing solvents". Reports of the Academy of Sciences of the USSR. 133 (2): 377–380.
- Moiseev, I. I. (2011). "Green chemistry in the bulk chemicals industry". Kinetics and Catalysis. 52 (3). Pleiades Publishing Ltd: 337–347. doi:10.1134/s0023158411030141. ISSN 0023-1584. S2CID 97097642.
