= James P. Collman =

American inorganic chemist (born 1932)

- Born: 1932 (age 93–94); Beatrice, Nebraska
- Education: University of Nebraska (BS, MS); University of Illinois at Urbana–Champaign (PhD)
- Scientific career
- Fields: Bioinorganic chemistry, organometallic chemistry
- Workplaces: University of North Carolina at Chapel Hill, Stanford University
- Thesis: The Magnesium Enolate of 2,2-Diphenylcyclohexanone (1958)
- Doctoral advisor: Reynold C. Fuson
- Doctoral students: Penelope Brothers, Kim Kimoon, Hilary Godwin, Jack R. Norton, Kenneth S. Suslick, Jonathan Sessler
- Other notable students: Robert H. Grubbs, Karl Barry Sharpless

James Paddock Collman (born 1932) is an American chemist who is the George A. and Hilda M. Daubert Professor of Chemistry, emeritus at Stanford University. Collman's research focused on organometallic bioinorganic chemistry. Collman is a member of the National Academy of Sciences.

== Early life and education ==
Collman was born in 1932, in Beatrice, Nebraska.

Collman received B.S. (1954) and M.S. degrees (1956) in chemistry from the University of Nebraska. He received a Ph.D. degree from the University of Illinois at Urbana–Champaign in 1958 under Reynold C. Fuson. After serving as an Instructor at the University of North Carolina at Chapel Hill for one year, he was hired as an assistant professor in 1959. Collman was promoted to associate professor in 1962, then full professor in 1966. In 1967, he moved to Stanford University. He was promoted to George A. & Hilda M. Daubert Endowed Chair in Chemistry in 1980, and is now professor emeritus.

== Research contributions ==
Collman has contributed to several aspects of transition metal chemistry, as documented in over 366 scientific papers.

In the 1960s his group demonstrated that certain metal acetylacetonates undergo Friedel-Crafts-like reactions, indicating that these chelate rings have aromatic character.

In the area of organometallic chemistry, through reviews as well as original research, his group popularized the oxidative addition reaction, leading to the discovery of new low-valent complexes including Ru(CO)_{3}(PPh_{3})_{2} and IrCl(N_{2})(PPh_{3})_{2}. Collman's reagent, Na_{2}Fe(CO)_{4}, prepared in his laboratories, enables certain C-C coupling reactions in organic synthesis. He coauthored an influential textbook, Principles and Applications of Organotransition Metal Chemistry, that went through three editions.

He popularized the use of tetraphenylporphyrin as a biomimetic ligand for exploring the structure and function of myoglobin, cytochrome P450, and cytochrome oxidase.

== Awards and honors ==
- Received the American Chemical Society's award in Inorganic Chemistry.
- 2009 - winner of American Chemical Society's Ronald L. Breslow Award for Biomimetic Chemistry

Collman has advised many academic researchers, many of whom have gone on to notable careers. Two of his postdoctoral researchers at Stanford, Karl Barry Sharpless and Robert H. Grubbs, later received Nobel Prizes in Chemistry.
