= Penelope Brothers =

New Zealand chemistry academic

Penelope Jane Brothers
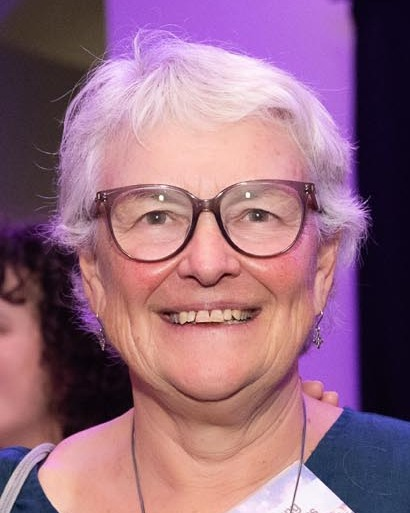
- Brothers in 2024
- Born: Auckland, New Zealand
- Education: University of Auckland (B.Sc., 1978; M.Sc., 1979); Stanford University (Ph.D., 1985)
- Scientific career
- Fields: Organometallic complexes, porphyrins
- Workplaces: Australian National University
- Thesis: The organometallic chemistry of ruthenium and osmium porphyrin complexes (1985)
- Doctoral advisor: James P. Collman

Penelope Jane Brothers is a New Zealand chemistry academic. She is currently Director of the Research School of Chemistry at the Australian National University, specializing in inorganic chemistry.

== Academic career ==
Brothers completed a Bachelor of Science and Master of Science at the University of Auckland, in 1978 and then 1979. Later that year, she traveled to Stanford University after receiving a Fulbright Program fellowship. There, she studied under James P. Collman and completed a 1985 PhD titled 'The organometallic chemistry of ruthenium and osmium porphyrin complexes.' The next year, Brothers returned to the University of Auckland as a postdoctoral researcher, rising to full professor in 2009. During her early career, she played a large role in establishing her field of porphyrin chemistry; as of 2018, she is the only researcher who has studied the role of boron in porphyrins or corroles.

In 2007, Brothers was named as a Fulbright Senior Scholar. She is also on the editorial board of the journal Chemical Communications as associate editor.

Professor Brothers left the University of Auckland to join Australian National University in 2019, where she is currently Director of the Research School of Chemistry.

== Selected works ==
- Chang, John Yu-Chih; Lu, Guo-Liang; Stevenson, Ralph J.; Brothers, Penelope J.; Clark, George R.; Botting, K. Jane; Ferry, Dianne M.; Tercel, Moana; Wilson, William R.; Denny, William A.; Ware, David C. (1 July 2013). "Cross-Bridged Cyclen or Cyclam Co(III) Complexes Containing Cytotoxic Ligands as Hypoxia-Activated Prodrugs". Inorganic Chemistry. 52 (13): 7688–7698. doi:10.1021/ic4006967. ISSN 0020-1669.
- Tonei, Deborah M., Lisa-Jane Baker, Penelope J. Brothers, George R. Clark, and David C. Ware. "Decarboxylation of an α-amino acid coordinated to cobalt (III): kinetic stabilisation and molecular structure of a Co–C–N three-membered ring incorporated into a cobalt (III) macrocyclic ligand complex." Chemical Communications 23 (1998): 2593–2594.
- Brothers, Penelope J., George R. Clark, Helen R. Palmer, and David C. Ware. "Condensation reactions of cobalt amino acid complexes with formaldehyde: Preparation and crystal structures of cobalt complexes containing new hexadentate, pendant-arm macrocyclic and acyclic ligands." Inorganic Chemistry 36, no. 24 (1997): 5470–5477.
- Brothers, Penelope J., and Warren R. Roper. "Transition-metal dihalocarbene complexes." Chemical Reviews 88, no. 7 (1988): 1293–1326.
- Brothers, Penelope J., and Mathias O. Senge. "Fundamentals of Porphyrin Chemistry: A 21st Century Approach." Wiley (2022). ISBN 978-1-119-12931-8.
