= Sara E. Skrabalak =

American chemist (born 1980)

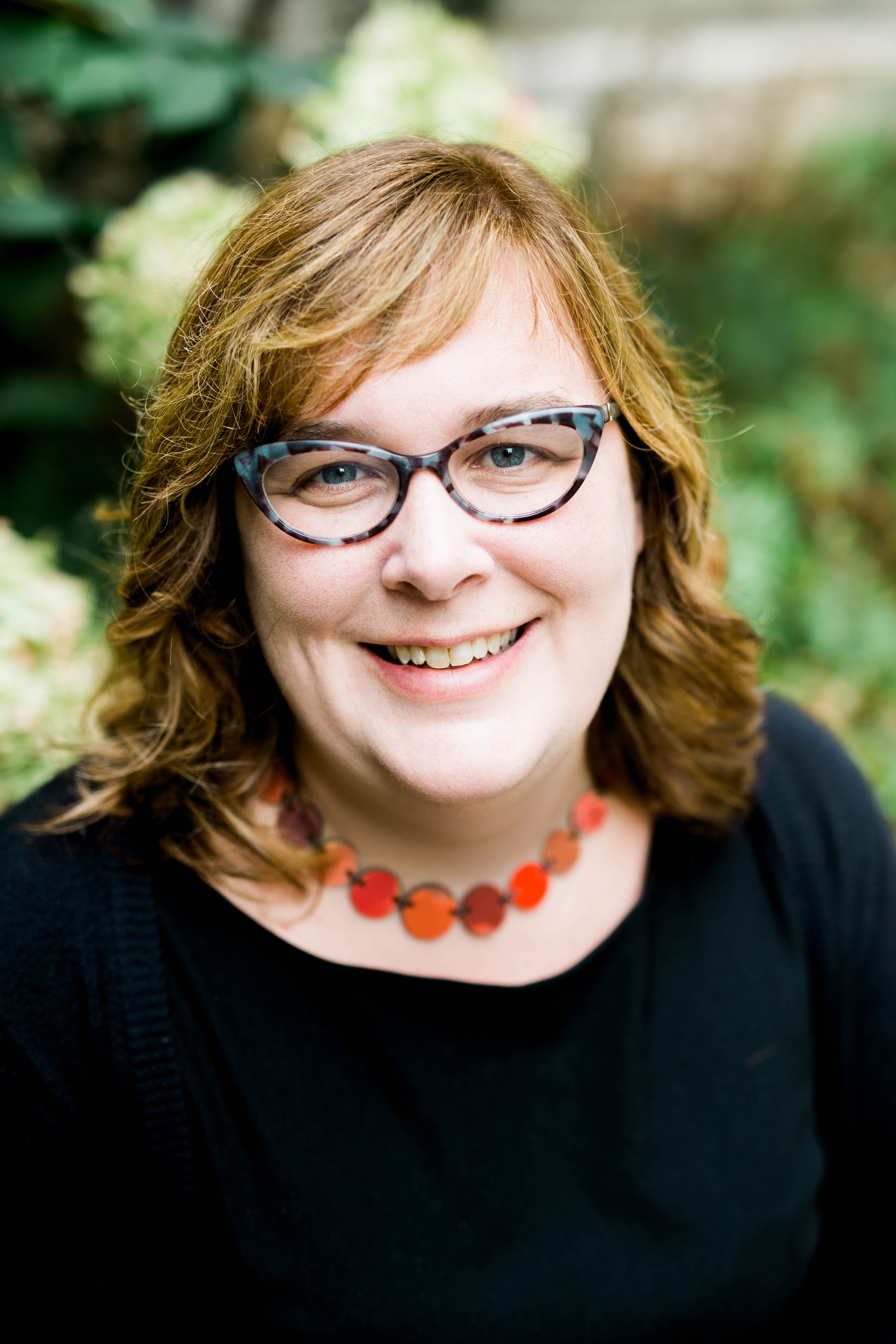
- Born: March 12, 1980 (age 46); Altoona, Pennsylvania, US
- Education: Washington University in St. Louis (BS); University of Illinois at Urbana-Champaign (PhD)
- Known for: Nanoscience, Materials Science, Synthesis
- Awards: Cottrell Scholar Award (2012); Sloan Research Fellow (2013); Fulbright Scholar (2017); Guggenheim Fellow (2017)
- Scientific career
- Fields: Chemistry
- Workplaces: Indiana University - Bloomington
- Thesis: Porous materials prepared by ultrasonic spray pyrolysis (2007)
- Doctoral advisor: Kenneth S. Suslick
- Other academic advisors: Younan Xia (post doctoral advisor)

Sara E. Skrabalak is a James H. Rudy Professor at Indiana University. Skrabalak leads a research group in the department of chemistry which focuses on the development of new nanomaterials. She has an adjunct appointment in the department of intelligent systems engineering.

== Early life and education ==
Skrabalak was born on March 12, 1980, in Altoona, Pennsylvania, and grew up in Indiana, Pennsylvania.

Skrabalak obtained her B.S. from Washington University in St. Louis (chemistry, 2002)]. She conducted research with William Buhro while there, focused on nanotube synthesis by chemical vapor deposition methods. She received the Sowden Award from Washington University in St. Louis for her undergraduate research. She graduated summa cum laude and was inducted into Phi Beta Kappa and Sigma Xi.

She received her Ph.D. in chemistry at the University of Illinois at Urbana-Champaign in the laboratory of Kenneth Suslick (2006). Her thesis research focused on the aerosol synthesis of porous materials, and she was the recipient of the T.S. Piper Thesis Research Award from the chemistry department. Her postdoctoral research was conducted at the University of Washington with Xingde Li and Younan Xia. There she was introduced to colloidal metal nanoparticle synthesis and their biomedical applications.

== Career ==
Skrabalak joined the faculty in the department of chemistry at Indiana University in 2008 and advanced to the rank of full professor in 2017. The Provost named Skrabalak a Rudy Professor in 2015. Skrabalak served as the 2016 Nanoscience Chair for the Division of Inorganic Chemistry for the American Chemical Society. She has been an associate editor for the journal Nanoscale (Royal Society of Chemistry) before being appointed editor-in-chief of the journal Chemistry of Materials and ACS Materials Letters.

In addition to her group's research innovations, her research team volunteers at Wonderlab, a Museum of Science, Health, & Technology in Bloomington, IN. She also encourages undergraduate students at Indiana University to return to their local high schools to discuss their experiences as science majors through the Science Ambassadors Program.

Skrabalak's team is affiliated with the Indiana Innovation Institute (IN3), a research institute which seeks to address problems of particular interest and relevance to the U.S. Department of Defense.

== Research and notable publications ==
Skrabalak's work centers on the synthesis of new nanomaterials and elucidation of structure-property correlations. Her team has worked across diverse classes of nanomaterials, including metallic nanostructures and advanced transformations thereof as well as metal oxides, sulfides, and nitrides. Skralabak is particularly well-known for application and development of novel synthetic methods to advance nanomaterials with control of crystal shape. These methods include ultrasound spray strategies. The synthesized nanomaterials are applied to applications in catalysis, photocatalysis, separations, chemical sensing, and secured electronics.

- Weiner, Rebecca G.; DeSantis, Christopher J.; Cardoso, Mariana B. T.; Skrabalak, Sara E. (2014-08-26). "Diffusion and Seed Shape: Intertwined Parameters in the Synthesis of Branched Metal Nanostructures". ACS Nano. 8 (8): 8625–8635. doi:10.1021/nn5034345. ISSN 1936-0851. PMID 25133784.
- Koczkur, Kallum M.; Mourdikoudis, Stefanos; Polavarapu, Lakshminarayana; Skrabalak, Sara E. (2015-11-07). "Polyvinylpyrrolidone (PVP) in nanoparticle synthesis" (PDF). Dalton Transactions. 44 (41): 17883–17905. doi:10.1039/c5dt02964c. ISSN 1477-9234. PMID 26434727. S2CID 9323765.
- Xia, Younan; Xingde Li; Au, Leslie; Skrabalak, Sara E. (September 2007). "Facile synthesis of Ag nanocubes and Au nanocages". Nature Protocols. 2 (9): 2182–2190. doi:10.1038/nprot.2007.326. ISSN 1750-2799. PMID 17853874. S2CID 20587542.
- Skrabalak, S. E.; Chen, J.; Au, L.; Lu, X.; Li, X.; Xia, Y. (2007). "Gold Nanocages for Biomedical Applications". Advanced Materials. 19 (20): 3177–3184. Bibcode:2007AdM....19.3177S. doi:10.1002/adma.200701972. ISSN 1521-4095. PMC 2480527. PMID 18648528.
- DeSantis, Christopher J.; Peverly, Angela A.; Peters, Dennis G.; Skrabalak, Sara E. (2011-05-11). "Octopods versus Concave Nanocrystals: Control of Morphology by Manipulating the Kinetics of Seeded Growth via Co-Reduction". Nano Letters. 11 (5): 2164–2168. Bibcode:2011NanoL..11.2164D. doi:10.1021/nl200824p. ISSN 1530-6984. PMID 21500834.
- Skrabalak, Sara E.; Smith, Alison F. (2017-03-30). "Metal nanomaterials for optical anti-counterfeit labels". Journal of Materials Chemistry C. 5 (13): 3207–3215. doi:10.1039/C7TC00080D. ISSN 2050-7534.
- Wang, Chenyu; Chen, Dennis P.; Sang, Xiahan; Unocic, Raymond R.; Skrabalak, Sara E. (2016-05-23). "Size-Dependent Disorder–Order Transformation in the Synthesis of Monodisperse Intermetallic PdCu Nanocatalysts". ACS Nano. 10 (6): 6345–6353. doi:10.1021/acsnano.6b02669. PMID 27214313.
- Smith, Alison F.; Patton, Paul; Skrabalak, Sara E. (2016). "Plasmonic Nanoparticles as a Physically Unclonable Function for Responsive Anti-Counterfeit Nanofingerprints". Advanced Functional Materials. 26 (9): 1315–1321. doi:10.1002/adfm.201503989. ISSN 1616-3028. S2CID 100980261.
- Weiner, Rebecca G.; Skrabalak, Sara E. (2015). "Metal Dendrimers: Synthesis of Hierarchically Stellated Nanocrystals by Sequential Seed-Directed Overgrowth". Angewandte Chemie. 127 (4): 1197–1200. Bibcode:2015AngCh.127.1197W. doi:10.1002/ange.201409966. ISSN 1521-3757. PMID 25424302.

== Awards ==
- NSF CAREER Award (2010)
- Cottrell Scholar Award, Research Corporation for Science Advancement (2012)
- DOE Early Career Award (2013)
- Sloan Research Fellow (2013)
- Camille Dreyfus Teacher Scholar (2014)
- ACS Award in Pure Chemistry (2014)
- Frontiers in Research Excellence & Discovery (FRED) Award, Research Corporation for Science Advancement (2017)
- John Simon Guggenheim Memorial Foundation Fellow (2017)
- Fulbright Foundation Fellow, Spain (2017-2018)
