= Roeland Nolte =

Dutch chemist (1944–2024)

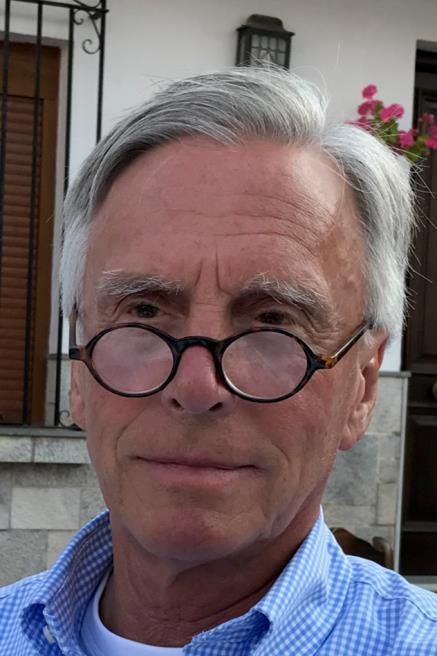
- Born: Roeland Johannes Maria Nolte; 16 December 1944; Bergh, German-occupied Netherlands
- Died: 15 February 2024 (aged 79); Nijmegen, Netherlands
- Education: Ruimzicht Gymnasium; University of Utrecht (Master's, Ph.D.)
- Awards: Member of the Royal Belgian Academy of Sciences (2000); Eli Burstein Lecturer in Materials Science, University of Pennsylvania (2003); First Royal Academy of Science Professorship (2003); Order of the Netherlands Lion (2004); Cornforth Lectureship at the University of Sydney (2005); Izatt-Christensen Award (2006); Member of the Royal Netherlands Academy of Arts and Sciences (2006); Merck-Karl Pfister Lecturer, Massachusetts Institute of Technology (2007); Member of the Academia Europaea (2013); Twice received an ERC Advanced Grant (2017); Linstead Life-time Achievement Award (2018)
- Scientific career
- Fields: Organic chemistry Biochemistry; Supramolecular chemistry Polymer chemistry
- Institutions: Radboud University Nijmegen
- Thesis: Synthesis and isomerization of polyisocyanides (1973)
- Doctoral advisor: Wiendelt Drenth
- Other academic advisors: Donald J. Cram
- Website: www.ru.nl/science/molecularnanotechnology/

Roeland Johannes Maria Nolte (16 December 1944 – 15 February 2024) was a Dutch chemist, known for his work in the fields of organic chemistry, biochemistry, polymer chemistry, and supramolecular chemistry. He was an emeritus Royal Netherlands Academy of Arts and Sciences professor and an emeritus professor of organic chemistry at Radboud University in Nijmegen, The Netherlands. Until his death, he held a special chair, i.e. professor of molecular nanotechnology, at Radboud University. Nolte was considered to be one of the pioneers of the field of supramolecular chemistry, which encompasses the design and synthesis of new chemical structures from low molecular weight compounds and biopolymers using non-covalent interactions. He published many studies on supramolecular assembly and biomimetic catalysts, which find applications in the field of nanomaterials and medicine.

== Education ==
Nolte attended Gymnasium Ruimzicht in Doetinchem, where he graduated in 1963. Thereafter, he studied chemistry at the University of Utrecht, where he received his master's degree in 1969. He continued his studies at the same university, earning a Ph.D. in physical organic chemistry on the synthesis and properties of a new type of polymer in 1973 (supervisor Wiendelt Drenth). After a postdoctoral stage with Nobel laureate Donald J. Cram at UCLA, he joined the Faculty of Science of Utrecht University as an assistant professor.

== Career ==
Nolte started his career as an assistant professor at the University of Utrecht and was promoted to associate professor in 1979. In 1987, he moved to Radboud University in Nijmegen as a full professor of organic chemistry. Nolte was appointed adjunct professor of supramolecular chemistry at the Eindhoven University of Technology in 1994. In 2002, he became the first director of the new Institute for Molecules and Materials at Radboud University in Nijmegen, which he remained until his retirement in 2010. In honour of his contributions to science, he was awarded a special Royal Netherlands Academy of Arts and Sciences Professorship in 2003. Nolte retired in 2010, after which he received a special university professorship in molecular nanotechnology at Radboud University.

== Work ==
Nolte's research focused on supramolecular systems with special properties and functions. These are designed based on the principles of organic chemistry and polymer chemistry, usually by first synthesizing molecular building blocks of different shapes and properties, which are subsequently self-assembled in a second step to form functional nanostructures. Self-assembly takes place by a combination of weak (supramolecular) interactions, such as hydrogen bonding, pi-pi-stacking interactions, van der Waals interactions, and coordination bonds. The designed structures find applications in the fields of materials science and catalysis. Nature was often used as a source of inspiration.

Very early on in his career, Nolte discovered the first example of a polymer with a stable helical structure, called an atropisomeric polymer, i.e. a polymer which cannot rotate around its main chain carbon atoms. He separated the left-handed and right-handed polymer helices and studied the mechanism of their formation, which was catalyzed by nickel ions and found to take place via a new mechanism, i.e. a polymerization reaction that takes place in a circular fashion around the metal center (merry-go-round mechanism). Later studies on atropisomeric polymers derived from isocyanopeptides revealed that these compounds formed superhelical structures by a supramolecular process of hierarchical self-assembly.

Other polyisocyanide derivatives formed hydrogels at very low concentrations, displaying strain stiffening, i.e. they become stronger when a force is applied, a property that previously had only been found in natural materials.

Nolte pioneered the assembly of disc-like molecules, such as porphyrins and phthalocyanines into long supramolecular polymers. Some of these formed superhelical structures by a process in which information is transferred stepwise from the building blocks to the polymer chains and subsequently to the helical assembly of polymers. These discs could also be used to generate layers for the alignment of liquid-crystalline molecules by a process of self-assembly and aided assembly.

Other research activities by Nolte involved the chemical modification of viruses, for which he coined the name chemical virology. In these viruses he encapsulated enzymes, allowing him to study their activities in a confined environment by single molecule techniques. Furthermore, he used viruses as building blocks for the synthesis of nanomaterials. More recently, he developed a synthetic catalyst that can move along a DNA chain and cleave it. He also designed molecular machines that can encode digital information into single polymer chains in the form of chiral chemical groups.

== Death ==
Nolte died in Nijmegen on 15 February 2024, at the age of 79.

== Awards ==
Nolte received numerous lecture awards, such as the Cornforth lectureship at the University of Sydney, the Eli-Burnstein lectureship at the University of Pennsylvania, and the Merck-Carl Pfister visiting professorship at the Massachusetts Institute of Technology. He won several prizes, including the first Royal Academy of Science Professorship (2003), the Izatt-Christensen Award (2006) for his studies on macrocyclic and supramolecular chemistry, and the Linstead Life-time Achievement Award for his pioneering work on supramolecular phthalocyanine systems. In 2006 he was elected a member of the Royal Netherlands Academy of Arts and Sciences. He was member of the Royal Belgian Academy of Sciences, and the Academia Europaea. He was furthermore awarded an Honorary Fellowship of the Royal Netherlands Chemical Society. In 2004 he became a Knight in the Order of the Dutch Lion. After his retirement, he twice received a prestigious ERC Advanced Grant to study the encoding of information into polymers by supramolecular catalytic machines.
