= Kenneth S. Suslick =

American chemist (born 1952)

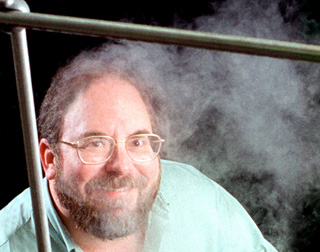
- Suslick in 2000
- Born: 1952 (age 73–74); Chicago, Illinois, US
- Education: California Institute of Technology, Stanford University
- Known for: Sonochemistry, sonoluminescence, chemical sensors and artificial olfaction, mechanochemistry
- Awards: National Academy of Sciences (USA), ACS Hildebrand Award for Chemistry of Liquids, RSC Sir George Stokes Medal, MRS Medal, ACS Nobel Laureate Signature Award, RSC Centenary Prize, ASA Rayleigh-Helmholtz Medal
- Scientific career
- Fields: Chemistry
- Workplaces: University of Illinois at Urbana–Champaign
- Doctoral advisors: James P. Collman and John I. Brauman
- Doctoral students: Sara E. Skrabalak, Hyeon Taeghwan, Mark W. Grinstaff

Kenneth S. Suslick (born 1952) is an American chemist who is the Marvin T. Schmidt Professor of Chemistry Emeritus at the University of Illinois at Urbana–Champaign. His area of focus is on the chemical and physical effects of ultrasound, sonochemistry, and sonoluminescence. In addition, he has worked in the fields of artificial and machine olfaction, electronic nose technology, chemical sensor arrays, and the use of colorimetric sensor arrays as an optoelectronic nose.

== Career ==
Ken Suslick received his B.S. from the California Institute of Technology in 1974, his Ph.D. from Stanford University in 1978, and came to the University of Illinois at Urbana-Champaign immediately thereafter.

Professor Suslick is a member of the National Academy of Sciences (USA), Fellow of the National Academy of Inventors, the American Chemical Society, the Royal Society of Chemistry, the Materials Research Society, the Acoustical Society of America, the American Physical Society, and the American Association for the Advancement of Science.

Professor Suslick has mentored more than 75 Ph.D. students and 35 postdoctoral associates. He has published more than 500 scientific papers, edited four books, and holds more than 71 patents and patent applications. His papers have been cited more than 68,000 times and his h-index is 132 (i.e., 132 papers with 132 or more citations), as of January, 2024. His six most cited non-review scientific papers are listed below.

In addition to his academic research, Professor Suslick has had significant entrepreneurial experience. He was the lead consultant for Molecular Biosystems Inc. and part of the team that commercialized the first echo contrast agent for medical sonography, Albunex™, which became Optison™ by GE Healthcare. In addition, he was the founding consultant for VivoRx Pharmaceuticals and helped invent and commercialize Abraxane™, albumin microspheres with a paclitaxel core, which is the predominant current delivery system for taxol chemotherapy for breast cancer; VivoRx became Abraxis Bioscience, which was acquired by Celgene for $2.9 billion. He then co-founded ChemSensing and its successor companies, Specific Diagnostics, Inc., and iSense Systems in Mountain View, for the commercialization of the Suslick group's chemical sensing technology with particular focus on biomedical applications, i.e., the Vitek REVEAL™ system. Specific Diagnostics Inc. was purchased in 2022 by the French Biotech company, BioMérieux.

== Selected awards and honors ==
- National Academy of Sciences (USA), 2024.
- Distinguished Alumni Award, California Institute of Technology, 2023.
- Theophilus Redwood Award, Royal Society of Chemistry, 2021.
- Joel Henry Hildebrand Award in Theoretical and Experimental Chemistry of Liquids, 2020 American Chemical Society.
- Eastern Analytical Symposium Award for Outstanding Achievements in the Fields of Analytical Chemistry, 2021"Eastern Analytical Symposium Awards".
- 76th George Eastman Visiting Professorship, 2018-2019, University of Oxford, and Fellow, Balliol College.
- Helmholtz-Rayleigh Interdisciplinary Silver Medal, (2018), Acoustical Society of America, 2018.
- Chemical Pioneer Award, American Institute of Chemists, 2018.
- Fellow, National Academy of Inventors, 2016.
- Centenary Prize, Royal Society of Chemistry, 2016.
- Sir George Stokes Award, Royal Society of Chemistry, 2008.
- Nobel Laureate Signature Award, American Chemical Society, 1994.
- Materials Research Society Medal, 1994.
- Senior Cope Scholar Award, American Chemical Society, 2004
- Acoustical Society of America Mentorship Award, 2009.
- Wolfgang Göpel Award, Intl. Soc. on Olfaction & Electronic Noses, 2001.
- Guggenheim Memorial Foundation Fellow, 2011-2012.
- NIH Research Career Development Award
- Sloan Foundation Research Fellowship
- Silver Medal of the Royal Society for Arts, Manufactures, and Commerce

=== Lectureships ===
- Harold S. Johnston Lectureship in Physical Chemistry, University of California, Berkeley
- Schulich Visiting Professor Lectureship, Technion-Israel Institute of Technology.
- Café Scientifique, Oxford University Natural History Museum, Oxford, UK.
- George Eastman Lecture, Engineering Science, University of Oxford.
- Crano Memorial Lectureship, Akron ACS Section.
- Charles William Murtiashaw III Lectureship, University of South Carolina, Columbia
- J.T. Donald Lectureship, McGill University, Montreal
- University of Melbourne Special Public Lectureship
- W. Heinlen Hall Lectureship, Bowling Green State University
- Robert A. Welch Foundation Lecturer
- Wilsmore Fellow, University of Melbourne

== Research interests ==
The Suslick Research Group at the University of Illinois at Urbana–Champaign is multi-disciplinary and has worked on three major research areas: (1) the chemical and physical effects of ultrasound (which includes nano-materials synthesis and sonoluminescence); (2) the mechanochemistry of inorganic solids (including shock wave energy dissipation by MOFs, i.e., metal-organic framework solids); and (3) chemical sensing, molecular recognition, and artificial olfaction, which is a spinoff of earlier work on the bioinorganic and materials chemistry of metalloporphyrins. Of particular interest is the development of the optoelectronic nose, i.e., colorimetric sensor arrays for the detection of VOCs, toxic industrial chemicals, explosives, as well as diverse QA/QC applications for foods and beverages.

== Selected works ==
(for a complete list of publication and with downloadable pdfs here)

Some Overviews and Reviews:

- Li, Z.; Suslick, K. S. "The Optoelectronic Nose" Accts. Chem. Res. 2021, 54, 950-960. https://doi.org/10.1021/acs.accounts.0c00671
- Zhou, X; Miao, Y.-R.; Suslick, K. S.; Dlott, D. D. "The Mechanochemistry of MOFs under Pressure and Shock" Accts. Chem. Res. 2020, 53, 2806–2815. https://doi.org/10.1021/acs.accounts.0c00396
- Suslick, K. S.; Eddingsaas, N. C.; Flannigan, D. J.; Hopkins, S. D.; Xu, H. "The Chemical History of a Bubble" Accts. Chem. Res. 2018, 51, 2169–2178. https://doi.org/10.1021/acs.accounts.8b00088
- Xu, H.; Zeiger, B. W.; Suslick, K. S. "Sonochemical synthesis of nanomaterials" Chem. Soc. Rev. 2013, 42, 2555–2567. https://doi.org/10.1039/C2CS35282F
- Bang, J. H.; Suslick, K. S. "Applications of Ultrasound to the Synthesis of Nanostructured Materials" Advanced Materials 2010, 22, 1039-1059. https://doi.org/10.1002/adma.200904093
- Suslick, K. S.; Bhyrappa, P.; Chou, J. H.; Kosal, M. E.; Nakagaki, S.; Smithenry, D. W.; Wilson, S. R. "Microporous Porphyrin Solids" Acc. Chem. Res. 2005, 38, 283 - 291. https://doi.org/10.1021/ar040173j
- Suslick, K. S. "Sonochemistry" Science, 1990, 247, 1439–45. https://doi.org/10.1126/science.247.4949.1439

Regarding sonochemistry:

- Suslick, K. S. "The Chemical Effects of Ultrasound," Scientific American 1989 (2) 260, 80–86.
- Prozorov, T.; Prozorov, R.; Suslick, K. S. "High Velocity Inter-Particle Collisions Driven by Ultrasound" J. Am. Chem. Soc. 2004, 126, 13890–13891.
- Skrabalak, S. E.; Suslick, K. S. "Porous Carbon Powders Prepared by Ultrasonic Spray Pyrolysis" J. Am. Chem. Soc. 2006, 128, 12642–12643.
- Bang, J. H.; Suslick, K. S. "Sonochemical Synthesis of Nanosized Hollow Hematite" J. Am. Chem. Soc. 2007, 129, 2242–2243.
- Bang, J. H.; Suslick, K. S. "Applications of Ultrasound to the Synthesis of Nanostructured Materials" Advanced Materials 2010, 22, 1039–1059.
- Hinman, J. J.; Suslick, K. S. "Nanostructured Materials Synthesis Using Ultrasound" Top. Curr. Chem., 2017, 375, 1-36.
- Barcikowski, S.; Plech, A.; Suslick, K. S.; Vogel, A. "Materials synthesis in a bubble" MRS Bulletin 2019, 44, 382–391.

Regarding sonoluminescence:

- Flint, E. B.; Suslick, K. S. "The Temperature of Cavitation" Science 1991, 253, 1397–1399.
- McNamara III, W. B.; Didenko, Y.; Suslick, K. S. "Sonoluminescence Temperatures During Multibubble Cavitation" Nature, 1999, 401, 772–775.
- Didenko, Y.; McNamara III, W. B.; Suslick, K. S. "Molecular Emission from Single Bubble Sonoluminescence" Nature, 2000, 406, 877–879.
- Didenko, Y.; Suslick, K. S. "The Energy Efficiency of Formation of Photons, Radicals, and Ions During Single Bubble Cavitation" Nature 2002, 418, 394–397.
- Flannigan, D. J.; Suslick, K. S. "Plasma Formation and Temperature Measurement during Single-Bubble Cavitation" Nature, 2005, 434, 52–55.
- Suslick, K. S.; Flannigan, D. J. "Sonoluminescence" Annu. Rev. Phys. Chem. 2008, 59, 659–683.
- Flannigan, David J.; Suslick, Kenneth S. (2010). "Inertially confined plasma in an imploding bubble". Nature Physics. 6 (8): 598–601. Bibcode:2010NatPh...6..598F. doi:10.1038/nphys1701.

Regarding chemical sensing and electronic nose technology:

- Rakow, N. A.; Suslick, K. S. "A Colorimetric Sensor Array for Odour Visualization" Nature, 2000, 406, 710–714.
- Zimmerman, S. C.; Wendland, M. S.; Rakow, N. A.; Zharov, I.; Suslick, K. S. "Synthetic Hosts by Monomolecular Imprinting Inside Dendrimers" Nature 2002, 418, 399–403.
- Wang, J.; Luthey-Schulten, Z.; Suslick, K. S. "Is the Olfactory Receptor A Metalloprotein?" Proc. Natl. Acad. Sci. U.S.A., 2003, 100, 3035–3039.
- Suslick, K. S. "An Optoelectronic Nose: Colorimetric Sensor Arrays" MRS Bulletin, 2004, 29, 720–725.
- Lim, S. H.; Feng, L.; Kemling, J. W.; Musto, C. J.; Suslick, K. S. "An Optoelectronic Nose for Detection of Toxic Gases" Nature Chemistry, 2009, 1, 562–567.
- Suslick, B. A.; Feng, L.; Suslick, K. S. "Discrimination of Complex Mixtures by a Colorimetric Sensor Array: Coffee Aromas" Anal. Chem., 2010, 82, 2067–2073.
- Feng, L.; Musto, C.J.; Kemling, J. W.; Lim, S.H.; Suslick, K. S. "A Colorimetric Sensor Array for Identification of Toxic Gases below Permissible Exposure Limits" Chem. Commun., 2010, 46, 2037–2039.
- Feng, L.; Musto, C.J.; Suslick, K. S. "A Simple and Highly Sensitive Colorimetric Detection Method for Gaseous Formaldehyde" J. Am. Chem. Soc., 2010, 132, 4046–4047.
- Askim, Jon; Morteza Mahmoudi; Kenneth S. Suslick (2013). "Optical sensor arrays for chemical sensing: the optoelectronic nose". Chemical Society Reviews. 42 (22): 8649–8682. doi:10.1039/C3CS60179J. PMID 24091381.
- Askim, J. R.; Suslick, K. S. "Hand-Held Reader for Colorimetric Sensor Arrays" Anal. Chem. 2015, 87, 7810–7816.
- LaGasse, M. K.; McCormick, K.; Li, Z.; Khanjian, H.; Schilling, M.; Suslick, K. S. “Colorimetric Sensor Arrays: Development and Application to Art Conservation” J. Amer. Inst. Conservation 2018, 57, 127–140.
- Zheng, L.; Askim, J. R.; Suslick, K. S. “The Optoelectronic Nose: Colorimetric and Fluorometric Sensor Arrays” Chem. Rev., 2019, 119, 231–292.

Regarding mechanochemistry of inorganic solids and Metal-organic framework solids (MOFs):

- Eddingsaas, N. C.; Suslick, K. S. "Mechanoluminescence: Light from sonication of crystal slurries" Nature, 2006, 444, 163.
- Zeiger, B. W.; Suslick, K. S. “Sonofragmentation of Molecular Crystals” J. Am. Chem. Soc. 2011, 133, 14530–14533.
- Suslick, K. S. “Mechanochemistry and Sonochemistry: Concluding Remarks” Faraday Discuss. 2014, 170, 411–422.
- Su, Z.; Miao, Y.-R.; Mao, S.-M.; Zhang, G.-H.; Dillon, S.; Miller, J. T.; Suslick, K. S. “Compression-Induced Deformation of Individual MOF Micro-crystals” J. Am. Chem. Soc. 2015, 137, 1750–1753.
- Su, Z.; Shaw, W. L.; Miao, Y.-R.; You, S.; Dlott, D. D.; Suslick, K. S. “Shock Wave Chemistry in a Metal–Organic Framework” J. Am. Chem. Soc. 2017, 139, 4619–4622.
- Ren, Y.; Banishev, A. A.; Suslick, K. S.; Moore, J. S.; Dlott, D. D. “Ultrafast Proton Transfer in Polymer Blends Triggered by Shock Waves” J. Am. Chem. Soc. 2017, 139, 3974–3977.
- Miao, Y.-R.; Su, Z.; Suslick, K. S. “Energy Storage during Compression of Metal–Organic Frameworks” J. Am. Chem. Soc. 2017, 139, 4667–4670.
- Kim, H. N.; Suslick, K. S. “Sonofragmentation of Ionic Crystals” Chem. Eur. J. 2017, 23, 2778–2782.
- Miao, Y.-R.; Suslick, K. S. “Mechanochemical Reactions of MOFs” Adv. Inorg. Chem. 2018, 71, 403–434.
- Zhou, X; Miao, Y.-R.; Shaw, W. L.; Suslick, K. S.; Dlott; D. D. “Shock Wave Energy Absorption in Metal–Organic Framework” J. Am. Chem. Soc. 2019, 141, 2220–2223.
