= Adam T. Woolley =

American chemist

Adam T. Woolley is a professor of chemistry at Brigham Young University (BYU) and the recipient of the 2007 Award for young investigators in Separation Science. Woolley and his group are applying microfabrication methods in making microfluidic systems for bioanalysis.

Woolley received his B.S. summa cum laude from BYU in 1992. In 1997 he received his Ph.D. from the University of California, Berkeley where he worked under Richard Mathies. He was then a Cancer Research Fund Runyon-Winchell Foundation Postdoctoral Fellow at Harvard University where he worked with Charles M. Lieber.

Woolley contributed a chapter to Robin Hui Liu and Abraham P. Lee's book Integrated Biochips For DNA Analysis. Woolley has also done work on nanowires and DNA use manipulation with nanotechnology. In 2007 Woolley was one of 58 recipients of the Presidential Early Career Award for Scientists and Engineers.

Woolley has been on the BYU faculty since 2000. Since the summer of 2010 Woolley has served as an associate chair of BYU's chemistry department.

== Publications ==
- "DNA-templated nanofabrication" in Chemical Society Review, 2009, Vol. 38, p. 329-337. secondary author with Héctor A. Becerril.
- "Direct haplotyping of kilobase-size DNA using carbon nanotube probes" (2002), Woolley was lead author along with Chantal Guillemette, Chin Li Cheung, David E. Housman and Charles M. Lieber.
- Structural biology with carbon nanotube AFM probes (2000), Woolley was lead author along with Cheung, Jason H. Hafner and Lieber.
- Biomed experts listing for Woolley
- Patterning and Fabrication of Conductive Nanowires as Interconnects for Nanoelectronic Circuits Using Nucleic Acid Molecules as Templates (1998), Woolley is the sole listed author.
- Covalently Functionalized Nanotubes as Nanometer-Sized Probes in Chemistry and Biology (1998), Stanislaus S. Wong was the lead author with the others being Ernesto Joselevich, Woolley, Cheung and Lieber listed in that order.
