= Diketopyrrolopyrrole dye =

Organic pigment

Chemical structure of pigment red 254, a common diketopyrrolopyrrole dye

Diketopyrrolopyrroles (DPPs) are organic dyes and pigments based on the heterocyclic dilactam 2,5-dihydropyrrolo[3,4-c]pyrrole-1,4-dione, DPP has high stability to heat but not to acid and base. The alkylation of amide groups improves their solubility.

DPP-based pigments have been commercialized, e.g., C.I. Pigment Red 254. They have been used in automotive paints due to their high resistance to photodegradation.

== Structure ==
nomenclature

DPP dyes are based on the bicyclic heterocyclic compound diketopyrrolopyrrole. 2,5-Dihydropyrrolo[3,4-c]pyrrole-1,4-dione is a basic body of diketopyrrolopyrroles. Because of their low solubility they are difficult to process, but soluble derivatives, so called latent pigments, are soluble can be converted to DPP by thermolysis of solution deposited thin films.

== Optical properties ==
In addition to their use in inks, paints, and plastic, DPPs have attracted attention for optical-electronic properties, foreshadowing potential photovoltaic applications. Modified DDP's show high fluorescence, and the emission wavelength is adjustable by change the aromatic group at 3 and 6 positions. Both electron donor group, such as thiophene, and expanding of the conjugated system increase the emission wavelength. DPP is also developed as a red emitting group in pure polymer light emitting diodes. Some DPP derivatives show aggregation induced emission and were investigated as fluorescent sensors, in organic solar cells.

== Research ==
DPP derivatives have been also investigated as promising fluorescent dyes for bioimaging applications, as well as components of materials for use in organic electronics.

== Related compounds ==
DPPs are structurally related to other classes of dyes and pigments that feature cross-conjugated nitrogen atoms and carbonyl groups, including:

- Indigo dyes
- Quinacridones
