= Nano (journal) =

- Discipline: Nanotechnology
- Language: English
- Edited by: R. Jayavel, Lars Samuelson, Xiao Wang, Renshaw

Publication details
- History: 2006-present
- Publisher: World Scientific
- Frequency: Monthly
- Impact factor: 1.1 (2024)

Standard abbreviations
- ISO 4: Nano

Indexing
- ISSN: 1793-2920 (print); 1793-7094 (web)
- LCCN: 2007243281
- OCLC no.: 73113261

Links
- Journal homepage; Online access; Online archive

Nano is an international, peer-reviewed scientific journal published by World Scientific that covers recent developments and discussions in the field of nanoscience and technology. Topics include nanomaterials, characterization tools, fabrication methods, numerical simulation, and theory.

Established in 2006, the journal was initially published bimonthly, increased to eight issues per year in 2014, and became a monthly publication in 2016. According to the Journal Citation Reports, the journal had a 2024 impact factor of 1.1.

== Abstracting and indexing ==
The journal is abstracted and indexed in the Science Citation Index Expanded, ISI Alerting Services, Materials Science Citation Index, Current Contents/Physical, Chemical & Earth Sciences, and Inspec.
