= Eric V. Anslyn =

American chemist and academic

Eric Anslyn
- Born: Eric Van Anslyn; June 9, 1960 (age 66); Santa Monica, California, US
- Education: California Institute of Technology
- Awards: Centenary Prize, Arthur C. Cope Scholar Award
- Scientific career
- Fields: Physical organic chemistry
- Workplaces: The University of Texas at Austin
- Thesis: Mechanistic, Synthetic and Theoretical Studies of High Valent Metallacycles and metal Alkylidenes (1987)
- Doctoral advisor: Robert Grubbs

Eric V. Anslyn (born June 9, 1960, Santa Monica, California) is an American chemist, University Distinguished Teaching Professor, and Welch Regents Chair in Chemistry at the University of Texas at Austin. He previously held the Norman Hackerman Professorship. Anslyn is co-author of Modern Physical Organic Chemistry, an introductory graduate textbook.

== Impact ==
Anslyn is notable for his work in developing designed receptors and sensor arrays by incorporating principal component analysis and discriminant analysis to mimic human taste and smell. Prof. Anslyn developed a colorimetric sensor to distinguish flavonoids (hydrolysis products of tannins) between varietals of red wines. An analogous colorimetric sensor was developed to mimic human taste by positioning polymer microbeads on a silicon chip. In related research, Prof. Anslyn designed a fluorometric chemical sensor consisting of a light-tight lego box and a smart phone to detect nerve agents such as VX and sarin.

== Awards ==
Anslyn received one of the American Chemical Society Arthur C. Cope Scholar Awards awarded in 2006 for his research in pattern recognition and supramolecular chemistry and the Izatt-Christensen Award in Macrocyclic and Supramolecular Chemistry in 2013. He was elected a Fellow of the American Academy of Arts and Sciences in 2024.

== Education ==
- Postdoctoral Work: [12/87-9/89] Columbia University, Research Advisor: Ronald Breslow

Research: Mechanistic studies of ribonuclease A mimics. Detailed kinetics analyses of imidazole catalyzed 3'→5' UpU hydrolysis and isomerization. Synthesis and kinetics studies of bis-imidazole β-cyclodextrin catalyzed phosphodiester hydrolyses.

- Ph.D., Chemistry: [11/87] California Institute of Technology, Research Advisor: Robert H. Grubbs

Research: Mechanistic and theoretical studies of olefin metathesis and ring-opening metathesis polymerizations catalyzed by group IV and VI metals.

- B.S., Chemistry: [5/82] California State University, Northridge
