= Mark W. Grinstaff =

- Born: May 23, 1965 (age 61); Texas
- Education: Occidental College; University of Illinois at Urbana–Champaign
- Scientific career
- Fields: Translational research Biomedical engineering Chemistry; Material science
- Workplaces: Duke University; Boston University; National Institutes of Health

Mark W. Grinstaff (born May 23, 1965) is the William Fairfield Warren Distinguished Professor and a Professor of Biomedical Engineering, Chemistry, Materials Science and Engineering and Medicine, at Boston University, Director of the National Institutes of Health's T32 Program in Translational Research in Biomaterials and Director of Nanotechnology Innovation Center. Grinstaff group is an interdisciplinary lab of scientists and engineers working on innovative projects. Grinstaff has developed new paradigms for translating rigorous academic research into practical applications, fostering intellectual advancement, economic growth, and enhanced clinical outcomes. His career is characterized by continuous exploration and innovation, with his discoveries influencing diverse research areas. Additionally, he is a co-founder of several companies and a co-inventor of several regulatory-approved drug and device products currently used in the clinic today.

== Early life and education ==
Grinstaff was born on May 23, 1965, in Texas. He attended Redlands High School in Redlands, California, and was an Eagle Scout and Vigil member of the Order of the Arrow, Boy Scouts of America. Grinstaff completed his undergraduate studies at Occidental College. During his first year at Oxy, he worked at the hummingbird section of a museum while simultaneously studying the kinetics of Friedel-Crafts chloromethylation reactions in the laboratory of Franklin DeHaan. He later worked as a chemistry teaching assistant. During his junior year at Oxy, he decided to pursue chemistry over medicine. He obtained his Chemistry degree in 1987.

In 1992, Grinstaff earned his doctorate from the University of Illinois at Urbana–Champaign, under the mentorship of Kenneth S. Suslick. While at UIUC he studied sonochemistry and reported one of the first synthetic methods to metal nanoparticles. His thesis focused on the use of sound waves to make amorphous iron and protein-nanoparticles and microspheres. For his postdoctoral work, he joined Harry B. Gray's laboratory at the California Institute of Technology where he conducted research on electron transfer chemistry in proteins and the mechanism of alkane hydroxylation using iron porphyrins and oxygen.

== Research career ==
Grinstaff's interdisciplinary research bridges polymer chemistry, biology, engineering, and medicine. The research is based on a molecular-focused approach involving the development of innovative tools and reagents, and the investigation of natural (polynucleotides, polypeptides, polysaccharides) and synthetic (polyesters, polycarbonates) polymers.

=== RNA Therapeutics Engineering Era ===
Messenger ribonucleic acid (mRNA) therapeutics are at the forefront of modern medicine as delivery of this polynucleotide results in in vivo protein production via translation. Critical to this advance was the original discovery of the application of modified nucleosides to mRNA by Karikó and Weissman which revolutionized the field and enable clinical utility. Advanced RNA technologies such as self-amplifying RNA (saRNA) offer even greater promise of lower dose vaccines and protein replacement therapies. While saRNA shows promise in preclinical and clinical studies, it triggers a potent innate immune response which impedes its replication and protein expression and thereby restricts its therapeutic utility. Unfortunately, incorporation of modified nucleoside triphosphates (NTPs; e.g., N1mΨ ) in saRNA does not yield protein expression supporting the current decades-long understanding in the field that modified NTPs do not work in saRNA. Building off the unexpected discovery that other modified nucleotides do enable successful translation in saRNA, Grinstaff, in collaboration with Dr. Wilson Wong, reported significantly reduced innate immune response with substantial protein expression and duration.

=== Control of Metabolic Dysfunction ===
An international team of scientists led by Dr. Mark Grinstaff, Dr. Orian Shirihai, and Dr. Jialiu Zeng published the first report of the potential use acidic nanoparticles as a first-in-kind therapeutic for non-alcoholic fatty liver disease (NAFLD) . NAFLD affects 20% to 30% of the world's population and no current treatments target the liver directly to counteract the disease of excess fat droplets in the liver. In NAFLD, lysosomes – small organelles in liver cells – responsible for eliminating excess fat do not function because of their poorly acidified level. Grinstaff investigated whether restoration of lysosomal function, by increasing its acidity to normal levels, recovers liver function and reduces the build-up of fat droplets in the liver. The lysosome targeting acidifying nanoparticles, termed as AcNPs, composed of fluorinated polyesters activate once in the lysosome to increase the acidity to healthy levels and restore autophagic flux, mitochondrial function, and insulin sensitivity – all key physiological indicators of liver function. In established high fat diet mouse models of NAFLD, re-acidification of lysosomes via AcNPs treatment returns liver function to lean, healthy levels with reversal of fasting hyperglycemia and hepatic steatosis. The ability to prepare new functional nanotechnologies which control cellular process is exciting and opens new areas of research.

=== Biodegradable Pressure Sensitive Adhesives ===
Pressure sensitive adhesives (PSAs) are materials that adhere to surfaces without requiring solvent, heat, or water activation. While widely used in products such as topical dressings and bandages, current PSAs are not applied internally within the human body. In clinical settings, PSAs could be useful for applications such as wound closure, drug delivery, tissue reinforcement, cell-embedded tissue scaffolds, and wearable medical devices due to their ability to join similar or dissimilar surfaces.

Research led by Mark Grinstaff has explored the development of degradable PSAs based on polyglycerol carbonates. These materials have been studied for their potential to restore tissue integrity and provide scaffolds for healing in a rapid and non-traumatic manner.

=== Research on Arthrofibrosis ===
Arthrofibrosis, a condition affecting over 5% of the general population, is characterized by a painful reduction in joint range of motion due to the accumulation of fibrotic tissue. Existing treatments are limited in efficacy and do not address the underlying cause of collagenous tissue build-up within joints.

Grinstaff, in collaboration with Drs. Ara Nazarian and Edward Rodriguez, investigated the therapeutic potential of relaxin-2, a naturally occurring peptide hormone. Their research demonstrated that relaxin-2 administration restored joint range of motion and reduced capsular fibrosis in a murine model of shoulder arthrofibrosis.

=== Biosensors for Medical Applications ===
Biosensors are crucial tools for diagnostics and patient care but are often limited by the availability of molecular sensing components. In collaboration with Dr. Galagan, Grinstaff's research focused on mining bacterial systems for transcription factors and enzymes to create novel biosensors. These biosensors have been designed for detecting analytes such as hormones (e.g., progesterone) and addictive substances (e.g., nicotine).

=== Development of New Polymers and Biomaterials ===
==== Poly-amido-saccharides ====
Grinstaff and collaborators synthesized poly-amido-saccharides (PASs), hybrid materials that combine the structural features of polysaccharides with defined molecular properties. Polysaccharides are diverse in molecular configuration, functionalization, linkage types, and degree of branching, and thus, are challenging synthetic targets. PASs are enantiopure polypeptide-polysaccharide hybrid materials with defined molecular weights and narrow dispersities synthesized using an anionic ring-opening polymerization of a β-lactam sugar monomer.

==== Glycerol-based polycarbonates ====
Grinstaff's team pioneered the synthesis of linear polycarbonates derived from glycerol. These polymers provide users the capabilities of well-known polymers like PLA (polylactic acid) or PLGA (poly(lactic-co-glycolic acid)) with the additional benefits of easily modifiable structure and non-acidic products upon biodegradation. He described the first synthesis of linear polycarbonates based solely on glycerol (i.e., poly(1,3-glycerol carbonate)) using a ring opening polymerization strategy. He also reported the first synthesis of atactic and isotactic linear poly(benzyl 1,2-glycerol carbonate)s via the ring-opening copolymerization of rac-/(R)-benzyl glycidyl ether with CO_{2} using [SalcyCoIIIX] complexes in high carbonate linkage selectivity and polymer/cyclic carbonate selectivity. These polymers have been applied in drug delivery and tissue engineering due to their biodegradability and structural flexibility (Macromolecules, 2003; ACS Macro Letters, 2015). This research led to the development of drug-eluting buttress technologies for lung tumor prevention, which have undergone clinical translation through the start-up AcuityBio, later acquired by Cook Biotech Inc.

==== Superhydrophobic biomaterials ====
Grinstaff has also explored superhydrophobic materials for biomedical applications, including drug delivery devices and diagnostic tools. The commonality in the design of these biomaterials is to create a stable or metastable air state at the material surface, which lends itself to a number of unique properties. Grinstaff fabricated drug-loaded 3D meshes with varying surface tensions (including those exhibiting superhydrophobicity) and introduced the concept of using surface tension as a new parameter to control drug release rates. In collaboration with Dr. Yolonda Colson, flexible drug-loaded buttresses, implanted at the resection margin, prevent lung tumor and extend survival in vivo. These materials utilize surface tension properties to control drug release rates and design sensors. For instance, a rapid sensor for measuring fat content in breast milk was developed to address nutritional challenges in low birth-weight infants.

=== Cartilage Imaging Agents ===
Grinstaff contributed to the development of imaging techniques for assessing articular cartilage, creating the first cationic X-ray computed tomography (CT) and magnetic resonance imaging (MRI) contrast agents. These agents, such as CA4+, allow non-destructive, 3D imaging of cartilage glycosaminoglycan content, equilibrium modulus, and coefficient of friction. Research utilizing these agents has been conducted on various animal models and human cadaveric specimens. Collaborative work with Dr. Janne Mäkelä has expanded this area, including advancements in two-color CT imaging, which are being applied in arthritis research and therapy evaluation.

=== Expansile Nanoparticles ===
In collaboration with Dr. Yolonda Colson, Grinstaff developed a nanoparticle-based drug delivery system with demonstrated efficacy in animal models of lung, ovarian, breast, and pancreatic cancers, as well as mesothelioma. These nanoparticles localize to tumors after intraperitoneal injection, where they undergo a hydrophobic-to-hydrophilic transition triggered by the low pH of the tumor microenvironment, facilitating drug release. This system minimizes systemic exposure while achieving high local drug concentrations. A related study demonstrated that pre-injecting empty nanoparticles followed by the drug 24 hours later enhances drug delivery to the tumor site. The system has shown that over 25% of the injected dose can localize to the tumor.

=== Investigating Interfaces: Interfacial Biomaterials, Nucleolipids, and Charge-Reversal Amphiphiles ===
Grinstaff explored interfacial biomaterials (IFBMs) to control biological processes at medical device implants. Using phage display technology, peptides were identified and assembled to form multifunctional coatings, with applications in orthopedics, cardiovascular devices, and diagnostics. This work was commercialized through Affinergy Inc., a company co-founded by Grinstaff.

The synthesis of supramolecular systems using non-covalent interactions is an important and increasingly successful synthetic strategy to complex systems. In collaboration with Prof. P. Barthélémy, Grinstaff synthesized nucleoside amphiphiles (nucleolipids), which combine nucleic acid recognition with lipophilic components. These materials form nanofibers, self-healing gels, and complexes with nucleic acids for gene transfection. The team also introduced charge-reversal amphiphiles, which transition from cationic to anionic states to enhance DNA binding and intracellular release, improving gene delivery systems.

=== Development of Biodendrimers, Cendritic Hydrogels, and Medical Applications ===
Grinstaff synthesized novel biocompatible biodegradable dendrimers from natural metabolites as new biomaterials and drug delivery vehicles, and coined the term "biodendrimers". Crosslinkable versions of these polyester, polyamide, and polyether-ester dendritic polymers enabled the preparation of new hydrogels with targeted biodegradation, mechanical, adhesive, and swelling properties. His work facilitated advancements in tissue engineering scaffolds for cartilage repair and sealants for corneal wound repair. The commercial potential of these discoveries led to the formation of Hyperbranch Medical Technology (acquired by Stryker Inc.) and commercialization of ocular as well as dural and spine sealants, which are now the standard of care (OcuSeal and Adherus Surgical Sealants, respectively). A decade later, Grinstaff introduced the concept of a hydrogel wound dressing that dissolves on-demand, via a thiol-thioester exchange reaction, aimed at reducing the pain in dressing changes for second-degree burn wounds.

=== DNA Electron Transfer and Photocrosslinkable Polysaccharides ===
Grinstaff began his independent research by developing novel site-specific synthetic methodologies for labeling DNA with inorganic and organic redox probes. These methods were used to study DNA electron transfer mechanisms and to construct conformationally gated electrochemical devices for nucleic acid detection. This research resulted in innovations such as hairpin-to-duplex transition and macromolecule folding based sensors for detecting nucleic acids. These devices, based on electron-transfer dynamics, were among the first of their kind.

During this period, Grinstaff also explored functionalized polysaccharides as biomaterials. He developed methacrylated hyaluronic acid and alginate as macromers for photopolymerization, complementing ongoing research by other notable scientists on photocrosslinkable polymers such as PEG by R. Langer, PLA-PEG-PLA by J. Hubbell, PVA by K. Anseth, and PPF-PEG by A. Mikos for in-situ hydrogel formation.

== Academic career ==
Grinstaff began his academic career at Duke University where he served as a faculty member from 1996 to 2002. During this time, he was part of the Pharmacology Training Grant Program and the Center for Cellular and Biosurface Engineering. He was also an assistant professor of ophthalmology at Duke University Hospital (1999–2002).

In 2003, Grinstaff joined Boston University as an associate professor. His recruitment was part of efforts linked to the Whitaker Foundation Leadership Award granted to the Department of Biomedical Engineering. He had joint appointments in the Boston University College of Engineering and Boston University College of Arts and Sciences, and subsequently with an appointment at Boston University School of Medicine. In 2004, he became a faculty member of the Boston University Nanotechnology Innovation Center, becoming the director in 2014.

In 2015, Grinstaff obtained a grant from Bill & Melinda Gates Foundation to develop the self-lubricating condom. Under his watch, several successful biotech companies have emerged: Virex Health, AcuityBio, Affinergy, and HyperBranch Medical Technology. Additionally, Grinstaff is the co-inventor of several products including Adherus Surgical Sealants and OcuSeal.

== Awards and honors ==
- Nobel Laureate Signature Award from the American Chemical Society (1994)
- PEW Award (1999)
- Edward M. Kennedy Award for Healthcare Innovation (2008)
- Fellow of the AIMBE (2010)
- Charter Fellow of the National Academy of Inventors (2012)
- Charles DeLisi Award and Lecture (2015)
- New England Institute of Chemists Distinguished Chemist, 2016
- Clemson Award for Applied Research, Society For Biomaterials, 2018
- William Fairfield Warren Distinguished Professor, 2022
- American Chemical Society Award in Applied Polymer Science, 2023
- Royal Society of Chemistry Centenary Prize, 2023
- National Science Foundation Trailblazer Engineering Impact Award, 2024
