= Aggregation-induced emission =

Luminescent phenomenon in certain fluorescent dyes

Aggregation-induced emission (AIE) is a phenomenon in which certain organic luminophores (fluorescent dyes) exhibit stronger emission of light in their aggregated or solid state compared to when they are in solution. This counterintuitive behavior contrasts with most organic compounds, which typically show reduced photoemission in the solid state due to processes like aggregation-caused quenching.

The core mechanism driving the AIE phenomenon is the Restriction of Intramolecular Motion (RIM). In solution, molecules can dissipate absorbed excitation energy as non-radiative thermal loss through low-frequency motions, such as bond rotations and vibrations. When these molecules aggregate, tight physical packing and intermolecular steric constraints immobilize these motions, shutting down non-radiative pathways and funneling excited-state energy into radiative decay, switching the emission "on". Beyond general motion restriction, mechanisms like the suppression of dark twisted intramolecular charge transfer (TICT) states, the prevention of non-radiative photochemical reactions (SPCR), and symmetry-driven electronic effects also play a crucial role in activating emission for specific fluorophores.

== Aggregation-induced emission enhancement ==
The phenomenon in which organic luminophores show higher photoluminescence efficiency in the aggregated state than in solution is called aggregation-induced emission enhancement (AIEE). Some luminophores, e.g., diketopyrrolopyrrole-based and sulfonamide-based luminophores, only display enhanced emission upon entering the crystalline state. That is, these luminophores are said to exhibit crystallization-induced emission enhancement (CIEE). Luminophores such as noble metallic nanoclusters show higher photoluminescence efficiency in the aggregated state than homogenous dispersion in solution. This phenomenon is known as Aggregation-Induced Emission (AIE).

== Aggregation-induced emission polymer ==
Fluorescence-emission Polymer is a kind of polymer which can absorb light of certain frequency and then give out light. These polymers can be applied in biomaterial area. Due to their high biocapacity and fluorescence, they can help researchers to find and mark the location of proteins. And polymers with property of aggregation-induced emission can also help to protect the healthy tissues from the harm of the medicines.
