= Herschel Medal =

- Awarded for: "investigations of outstanding merit in observational astrophysics"
- Reward: Medal
- First award: 1974
- Final award: 2025
- Website: https://ras.ac.uk/awards-and-grants/awards/herschel-medal

The Herschel Medal is awarded by the Royal Astronomical Society (RAS) for "investigations of outstanding merit in observational astrophysics". It is awarded for a single piece of work so that younger scientists can be candidates for the award. It is named after the RAS's first president, William Herschel. The medal was first awarded in 1974. From 1974 to 2004 the Herschel Medal was only awarded every three years. From 2004 the frequency was shortened to two years and from 2012 it was awarded annually. The medal has been shared twice, in 1977 and 1986. It has been awarded 28 times to a total of 30 people (28 men, two women), mostly from the UK.

== Medallists ==
Source: Royal Astronomical Society

Photo	Year	Medalist(s)	Field	References
	1974	John Paul Wild	Radio astronomy	
	1977	Arno Penzias; Robert Woodrow Wilson	Discovery of the Cosmic Microwave Background Radiation	
	1980	Gérard de Vaucouleurs	Galaxy classification and cataloging	
	1983	William W. Morgan	Stellar classification	
	1986	Albert Boggess; Robert Wilson	Ultraviolet astronomy	
	1989	Jocelyn Bell Burnell	Pulsars	
	1992	Andrew Lyne	Radio astronomy	
	1995	George Isaak	Helioseismology	
	1998	Gerry Neugebauer	Infrared astronomy	
	2001	Patrick Thaddeus	Structure and distribution of molecular clouds	
	2004	Keith Horne	Cataclysmic variable stars and exoplanets	
	2006	Govind Swarup	Radio astronomy	
	2008	Max Pettini	Extragalactic cosmology	
	2010	James H. Hough	Polarimetry	
	2012	Mike Irwin	Digital optical and infrared surveys	
	2013	Michael Kramer	Pulsars	
	2014	Reinhard Genzel	Galactic and Extragalactic astronomy	
	2015	Stephen Eales	Submillimetre astronomy	
	2016	James Dunlop	Galaxy formation	
	2017	Simon Lilly	Galaxy evolution	
	2018	Tom Marsh	Doppler Tomography	
	2019	Nial Tanvir	Studies of the Explosive Universe	
	2020	Rob Fender	Black hole accretion	
	2021	Stephen Smartt	Awarded for his "time-domain studies of transient phenomena, leading ground-breaking progress in our understanding of core collapse supernova and of gravitational wave kilonovae."	
	2022	Catherine Heymans	Weak Gravitational Lensing, and measurement of fundamental cosmological parameters.	
	2023	Heino Falcke		
	2024	Roberta Humphreys	Stellar astrophysics	
	2025	Ian Smail		
	2026	Andrew Bunker	Studies of high redshift galaxies	

== See also ==
- List of astronomy awards
