= Joseph Webster =

Joseph Webster may refer to:

- Eddie Webster (Joseph Edward Webster, 1902–1945), British long-distance runner
- Joseph Dana Webster (1811–1876), American civil engineer and soldier
- Joseph Philbrick Webster (1819–1875), American songwriter and composer
- Joseph Samuel Webster (died 1796), English portrait painter
- Joe Webster (footballer) (1886–1927), English football goalkeeper
- Joe Webster (politician), member of the Pennsylvania House of Representatives
- Joseph Webster (anthropologist) (born 1985), British anthropologist
