= Albert Boggess =

American astronomer

Albert R. Boggess III (30 January 1929 – 25 December 2020) was an American astronomer who spent much of his professional life working for NASA.

Boggess was born in Dallas, Texas. He attended Stephen F. Austin High School and majored in Physics and Mathematics at the University of Texas at Austin. His PhD was awarded by the University of Michigan in 1955. After post-doctoral work at Johns Hopkins, he conducted rocket research at the Naval Research Laboratory in Washington, DC, and moved to the Goddard Space Flight Center in 1959.

Boggess had a significant role in the creation and operation of the International Ultraviolet Explorer (IUE) Observatory, a satellite facility 'that helped open space research' to a wider population of scientists. The IUE was notable for its extended operational lifetime and for providing astronomers with near real-time access to ultraviolet observations. Together with Robert Wilson, he was the winner of the 1986 Herschel Medal for their contributions to ultraviolet astronomy research through the IUE project. He also served as the project scientist for the Hubble Space Telescope, which launched in 1990.
