= George Darwin Lectureship =

George Darwin Lecture
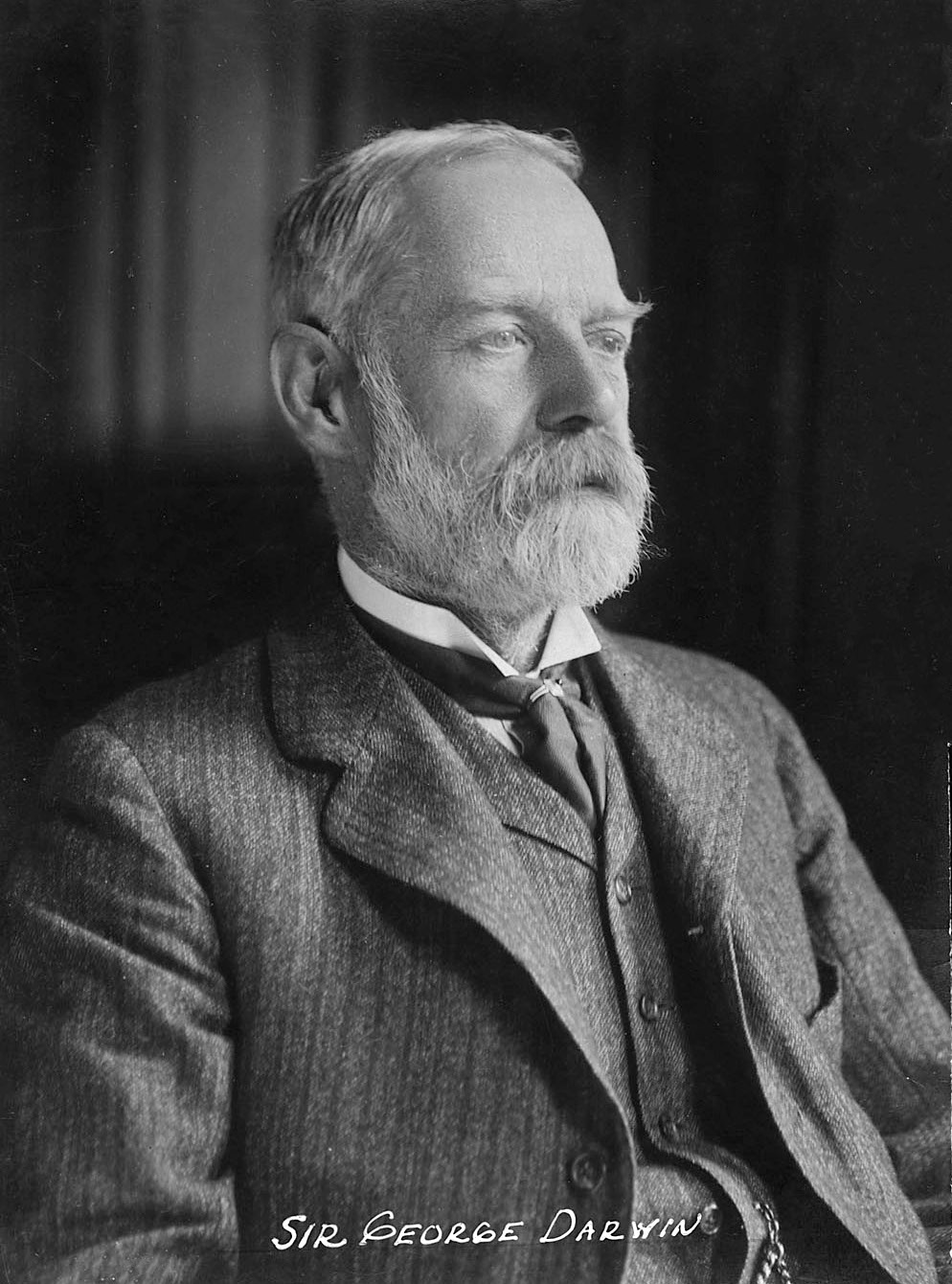
- The award is named in honour of the astronomer George Darwin
- Awarded for: distinguished and eloquent speaker on a suitable topic in astronomy, astrochemistry, astrobiology and astroparticle physics
- Sponsored by: Royal Astronomical Society
- Date: 1984
- Location: London
- Country: United Kingdom
- Named after: George Darwin
- Website: ras.ac.uk/awards-and-grants/awards/2267-george-darwin-lectureship

The George Darwin Lectureship is an award granted by the Royal Astronomical Society to a 'distinguished and eloquent speaker' on the subject of Astronomy including astrochemistry, astrobiology and astroparticle physics. The award is named after the astronomer George Darwin and has been given annually since 1984. The speaker may be based in the UK or overseas.

== George Darwin Lecturers ==
Laureates of the award include:

- 2024 Chiaki Kobayashi
- 2023 Dominic M. Bowman
- 2022 Alan Fitzsimmons
- 2021 Filippo Fraternali
- 2020 Ofer Lahav
- 2019 Chris Done
- 2018 Stephen J. Smartt: "Kilonovae and the birth of multi-messenger astronomy"
- 2017 Catherine Heymans : Observing the Dark side of our Universe
- 2016 Michael Kramer : Probing Einstein's Universe and its physics - the joy of being curious
- 2015 Katherine Blundell : Rapid Evolution in Astronomy
- 2014 James S. Dunlop : The Cosmic History of Star Formation
- 2013 Eline Tolstoy : Galactic Palaeontology
- 2012 Andrew Collier Cameron: Winds, Tides and the Migration of Hot Jupiters
- 2011 Michael Turner : Connecting quarks to the cosmos
- 2010 Carlos Frenk : The Small-Scale Structure of the Universe
- 2009 Neil Gehrels : SWIFT and its results
- 2008 Alan Watson : The Birth of Cosmic Ray Astronomy on the Argentine Pampas
- 2007 Reinhard Genzel : The Massive Black Hole and Nuclear Star Cluster of the Milky Way
- 2006 Michael Werner : The Spitzer Space Telescope: Probing the universe with Infrared Eyes
- 2005 Joseph Silk : The Dark Side of the Universe
- 2004 Mike Edmunds : The Elemental Universe
- 2003 Anneila Sargent : The Formation of Planetary Systems
- 2002 Ramesh Narayan : Evidence for the Black Hole Event Horizon
- 2001 Wendy Freedman : The Expansion Rate of the Universe
- 2000 Kip Thorne : Gravitational Waves: Opening a New Window onto the Universe.
- 1999 Geoff Marcy : Extrasolar Planets
- 1998 Michael Perryman : A Stereoscopic View of the Galaxy
- 1997 Simon White : The Formation of Galaxies
- 1996 Andrew Fabian : Broad Iron Lines from AGN: Test of Strong Gravity
- 1995 Bohdan Paczyński : Gravitational micro-lensing and the search for dark matter
- 1994 Scott Tremaine : Is the Solar System Stable?
- 1993 Riccardo Giacconi : Recent observations from the Hubble Space Telescope
- 1992 John Barrow : Unprincipled Cosmology
- 1991 Sandra Faber : How galaxies (probably) formed
- 1990 Andre Maeder : Massive Stars in Galaxies
- 1989 Roger Blandford : Gravitational Lenses
- 1988 Roger Tayler : The Sun as a Star
- 1987 Wal Sargent : Observing the evolution of large scale structure in the Universe
- 1986 Gerald Neugebauer : Infrared astronomy
- 1985 Robert Wilson: A perspective of ultraviolet astronomy
- 1984 Icko Iben : The life of an intermediate mass star - in isolation/in a close binary
- 1931 Willem de Sitter : Jupiter's Galilean satellites

== See also ==
- List of astronomy awards
