= The Sirens of Mars =

2020 non-fiction book

- First edition (UK)
- Author: Sarah Stewart Johnson
- Genre: Non-fiction
- Publisher: Allen Lane (UK); Crown Publishing Group (US)
- Publication date: 2020
- Pages: 288 pages
- ISBN: 978-1101904817

The Sirens of Mars is a 2020 non-fiction book by Sarah Stewart Johnson, focused on the search for life on Mars.

== Content and development ==
The book combines elements of memoir from Johnson with the history and science of attempts to discover life on Mars. The book grew out of miscellaneous notes and observations written down by Johnson which she determined were valuable but not necessarily suitable for strictly scientific publications.

== Reception ==
Kirkus Reviews referred to the book as a "...vivid, poetic account that leaves readers eager to see what's next in the quest to find extraterrestrial life." Hannah Wakeford, writing for BBC Sky at Night, suggested the book could have been improved with the addition of more maps and photographic material. She did, however, refer to it as "...a must-read for fans of our Martian neighbour".

== See also ==
- The Sirens of Titan, a science fiction novel by Kurt Vonnegut, Jr.
