= Pacification (military action) =

Type of military action

In a military context, the term pacification refers to a process by which the cooperation or surrender of a population is secured by military force or other means of coercion. The term originated in the Roman Empire where it saw popular usage in the context of the Roman ideal of pax (peace) and Roman imperial expansion. According to historian Myles Lavan, the Latin term pacare (to pacify) evoked to the Romans a grand project of peace-making while, in English, "pacified" has since crystallised as a euphemism for the suppression of resistance to state power.

From 1880 onward the term saw popular usage by colonial empires as a pretext for war under the guise of protecting populations, alongside the colonial concept of protectorates. The term pacification is therefore often presented in quotation marks by contemporary historians.

== List of conflicts and actions termed "pacifications" ==
- Dutch pacification campaign on Formosa (1635-1636)
- Pacification of Lanun (17th-18th centuries), anti-piracy operations by the Bruneian Empire
- Ten Great Campaigns, specifically the Qing campaigns against the Dzungars (1755–1757) and Xinjiang (1758–1759)
- Pacification of Algeria (1835-1903), French military operations which aimed to put an end to various tribal rebellions
- Occupation of Araucanía (1861–1883), also Pacification of the Araucanía, the actions which led to the incorporation of Araucanía into Chile
- Pacification of Tonkin (1885-1886), a military and political campaign undertaken by the French in northern Vietnam
- Dutch intervention in Lombok and Karangasem or Pacification of Lombok in 1894
- Campaigns of Pacification and Occupation (late 19th century–early 20th century), Portuguese military campaigns in their African colonies
- Pacification of Samar (1901-1902), a counterinsurgency operation during the Philippine-American War
- Kuomintang Pacification of Qinghai (1917-1949), a series of military campaigns against Tibetan tribes
- Pacification of Libya (1923-1932), an Italian military campaign against the Libyan resistance
- Pacification of Sarhad (1928-1934), Persian campaign against the Yarahmadzai tribe in Balochistan
- Pacification of Ukrainians in Eastern Galicia (1930), a punitive action by Polish police against the Ukrainian minority in Poland
- Pacification of Manchukuo, a campaign during the Second Sino-Japanese War (March 1932 – 1941)
- Pacification operations in German-occupied Poland, the use of German military force to suppress Polish resistance during World War II
- Pacification of Rabaul (1943-1945), an Allied campaign against Imperial Japanese forces
- Pacification of Wujek (1981), a strike-breaking action against miners in Katowice, Poland
- East Timor genocide#Indonesian pacification operations (1981–1983)
- Maré, Rio de Janeiro#Pacification efforts (2014), raids by Brazilian security forces in the lead up to the 2014 FIFA World Cup

== See also ==
- Propaganda in Augustan Rome

== Bibliography ==
- d'Andurain, Julie (2016). "Résolution des conflits au début du XXe siècle : « pacification » ou émergence d'une pensée tactique ethno-centrée" [Conflict resolution at the beginning of the 20th century: "Pacification" or the emergence of an ethnocentric tactical mindset]. Revue Défense Nationale (in French) (792): 53–58.
- Finch, Michael P.M. (2013). A Progressive Occupation? The Gallieni-Lyautey Method and Colonial Pacification in Tonkin and Madagascar, 1885-1900. Oxford University Press. ISBN 978-019-967-457-2.
- Klein, Jean-François (22 June 2020). ""Pacification", an Imperial Process". Encyclopédie d'histoire numérique de l'Europe.
- Lavan, Myles (2017). "Peace and empire: Pacare, pacatus, and the language of Roman imperialism". In Moloney, E.P.; Williams, Michael Stuart (eds.). Peace and Reconciliation in the Classical World. London: Routledge. pp. 102–114. ISBN 978-147-246-635-8.
