= Russian bounty program =

Alleged Russian military program of paid assassinations

The Russian bounty program was an alleged project of Russian military intelligence to pay bounties to Taliban-linked militants for killing U.S. and other allied service members during the U.S.-led war in Afghanistan. The existence of the alleged program was reported in the media in 2020 and became an issue in the 2020 presidential election campaign.

In June 2020, The Washington Post reported that intelligence suggesting the existence of a bounty operation dated to as early as 2018. Both the Washington Post and Associated Press reported that Trump administration officials were informed of the intelligence reports in early 2019. In June 2020, The New York Times reported that U.S. intelligence agencies had assessed, several months earlier, that Unit 29155 of the Russian military intelligence agency GRU had secretly offered Taliban-associated militants bounties to kill U.S. troops and other coalition personnel in Afghanistan, including during peace talks with the Taliban. The New York Times reported that "Officials said there was disagreement among intelligence officials about the strength of the evidence about the suspected Russian plot."

Defense Department officials then reported that U.S. military intelligence was unable to corroborate the reported program. In April 2021, the U.S. government reported that the U.S. intelligence community only had "low to moderate confidence" in the bounty program allegations.

== Background ==
In 2010, Iran reportedly paid Taliban fighters US$1,000 for each U.S. soldier they kill in Afghanistan (equivalent to $1,480 in 2025). U.S. and British officials have accused Iran of giving support and weapons to the Taliban insurgency in Afghanistan. In August 2019, The Washington Post reported that Iran's "relationship with the Taliban now spans the economic, security and political realms and is likely to grow as the Taliban asserts itself again." Pakistan and Saudi Arabia have been also accused of supporting Taliban.

Russia initially supported the United States' war on terror and agreed to provide logistic support for the United States forces in Afghanistan. In May 2015, Russia closed a key military transport corridor which allowed NATO to deliver military supplies to Afghanistan through the Russian territory. Intelligence reports that Russia supplies arms to the Taliban have persisted for several years with contact in Northern Afghanistan beginning around 2015. Security officials from the United States and Afghanistan have previously determined that Russia provides financial support and arms to the Taliban and its leaders. Russian government officials have called the accusations baseless. Carter Malkasian, a former adviser to U.S. military commanders in Afghanistan, said that Russia began cultivating relationships with "certain Taliban elements" in northern Afghanistan around 2015, ostensibly as a response to Islamic State activity. According to the BBC, Russia "is deeply concerned about the rise of Islamist fundamentalism in the region spreading in its direction. And it sees the Taliban as one potential bulwark against this." In February and again in May 2019, a delegation of Taliban officials and senior Afghan politicians met in Moscow to hold a new round of Afghan peace talks. Reuters reported that "Russian officials as well as religious leaders and elders had asked for a ceasefire."

Unit 29155 is a covert unit of the GRU tasked with foreign assassinations and other covert activities. The unit has been linked to the 2016 Montenegrin coup plot, the poisoning of Bulgarian arms manufacturer Emilian Gebrev, and the poisoning of Sergei and Yulia Skripal.

In 2019, 23 American service members were killed during operations in Afghanistan. Ten U.S. service members died from gunfire or improvised explosive devices in 2018 and 16 in 2019. Another two were killed in 2020 prior to the February ceasefire and the onset of the COVID-19 pandemic. Several of the soldiers were killed in green-on-blue attacks (attacks by members of Afghan security forces against coalition forces). In December 2019, the Afghanistan Papers revealed that high-ranking military and government officials were generally of the opinion that the war in Afghanistan was unwinnable, but kept this hidden from the public.

According to the lawsuit, filed in December 2019 in the D.C. District Court on behalf of Gold Star families, major U.S. and international defense contractors involved in Afghanistan made illegal "protection payments" to the Taliban, funding a "Taliban-led terrorist insurgency" that killed or wounded thousands of Americans in Afghanistan. A related lawsuit accused the Iranian government. In 2009, then-Secretary of State Hillary Clinton said that the "protection money" was "one of the major sources of funding for the Taliban."

On February 29, 2020, the Trump administration signed a conditional peace agreement with the Taliban, which calls for the withdrawal of foreign troops in 14 months if the Taliban uphold the terms of the agreement. In May 2020, President Trump said "it is time" to bring U.S. soldiers home from Afghanistan.

Research by Fetzer et al. finds that coalition fatalities increased media coverage of the Afghan conflict and reduced public support for the war across troop-sending NATO countries.

== Intelligence gathering ==
Trump White House officials were first informed in early 2019 of intelligence reports regarding a Russian bounty program.

Reports from Afghanistan-based U.S. Special Operations forces and intelligence officers that militants had been paid bounties in 2019 for their targeting of U.S. military personnel were raised in 2019 and 2020. The reports were based on interrogations of captured militants (including interrogations by the U.S. military), interrogations of captured criminals; and surveillance data. The accounts from Taliban militants "from opposite ends of the country and from separate tribes" were similar. Early on, intelligence agencies and analysts disagreed over the reliability of findings based on interrogations of the detainees. Intercepted electronic data showed large bank transfers to a Taliban-linked account from an account controlled by the GRU. Afghan officials said that several businessmen who transferred money through the hawala system were suspected of being intermediaries for the bounty program and were arrested in raids. Around January 2020, a joint operation between US forces and the Afghan National Directorate of Security raided a Taliban outpost in Kunduz. Thirteen people were arrested. One fled to Tajikistan while another, an Afghan drug lord Rahmatullah Azizi, was thought to have escaped to Russia. Security forces recovered around US$500,000 from Azizi's house in Kabul. According to the New York Times, U.S. intelligence identified Azizi as a key middleman, collecting multiple cash payments of hundreds of thousands of dollars from Russia and distributing them to Taliban-linked militants. The raid heightened U.S. intelligence suspicion of a Russian financial link to the Taliban and related networks.

Information on the bounty program was circulated in intelligence reports and two officials said that program was known by the region's CIA station chief as well as military forces tasked with engaging the Taliban. The CIA produced an intelligence assessment, reviewing and confirming the findings. The assessment concluded that Russian military operatives had covertly offered rewards for successful attacks on coalition forces in 2019. Rewards from the bounty program were thought to have been collected by Islamist militants or their criminal associates. Military officials also reviewed past combat casualties to determine whether any of the deaths could be attributed to the bounty program. Investigators focused on two attacks on U.S. troops, one of which was a bombing outside Bagram Airfield in April 2019 that killed Marines Robert A. Hendriks, Benjamin S. Hines, and Christopher Slutman. Officials did not describe how military targets were selected or the exact manner by which militants were paid. The unnamed Afghan officials claimed the bounty program offered up to $100,000 for each American or coalition soldier killed.

== Intelligence assessment ==
The existence of a Russian bounty program would mark an escalation of the ongoing Second Cold War and the first time GRU is known to have orchestrated attacks on Western military personnel. According to a New York Times report in July 2020, the Trump administration had sought to foster doubts about the existence of a Russian bounty program. The National Intelligence Council, which reported to Trump's director of national intelligence, John Ratcliffe, produced a two-and-a-half page memorandum stating that the CIA and National Counterterrorism Center assessed with "medium confidence" (i.e., "credibly sourced and plausible, but falling short of near certainty") that the GRU had offered bounties, but that the National Security Agency (NSA) and other Intelligence Community components said they "did not have information to support that conclusion at the same level" and thus had lower confidence in the conclusion. A separate Wall Street Journal report said that the NSA has "strongly dissented" from the CIA and Defense Intelligence Agency assessments that the bounty plot is credible and real.

The Department of Defense (DOD), in testimony in July 2020 to the House Armed Services Committee by General Mark Milley, the chairman of the Joint Chiefs of Staff and Defense Secretary Mark Esper, said that U.S. defense intelligence agencies had no information to corroborate reports of a Russian bounty program in Afghanistan and lacked evidence of "cause and effect linkages to a Russian bounty program causing U.S. Military casualties."

Upon taking office, Biden directed his administration to conduct a comprehensive review of U.S. policy toward Russia. The bounty reports were included in the review, along with other issues (such as the poisoning and imprisonment of Alexei Navalny, Russian efforts to interfere with the U.S. elections, and the SolarWinds cyberespionage attack). In 2021, Senator Tammy Duckworth (Democrat of Illinois) asked Director of National Intelligence Avril Haines to publicly release a declassified U.S. Intelligence Community assessment of the Russian bounty intelligence in the interest of transparency.

A spokesperson for the U.S. National Security Council (NSC) said in an April 2021 statement that the United States Intelligence Community had "low to moderate confidence" in the existence of the Russian bounty program. In U.S. intelligence, "moderate confidence" means that that intelligence assessed the information as "plausible and credibly sourced, but not quite corroborated enough to merit a higher rating" and "low confidence" means the conclusion was "based on questionable or implausible information — or information too fragmented or poorly corroborated to make solid inferences". Officials said that the "low to moderate confidence" was attributable to the sources of the bounty information (Afghan detainees, financial records captured during a raid, and "information and evidence of connections to criminal agents in Afghanistan and elements of the Russian government"), which cannot be taken at face value, as well as an operating environment in Afghanistan that makes intelligence-gathering (to corroborate hypotheses) difficult. However, this same statement also said that U.S. intelligence had "high confidence" in a separate assessment that Russian military intelligence manages "interaction with individuals in Afghan criminal networks" in a way "consistent with Russia's encouraging attacks against U.S. and coalition personnel in Afghanistan." Intelligence experts said that it is typical for intelligence to be murky.

== Reporting ==
Citing unnamed sources, on June 26, 2020, The New York Times reported on a Russian military program to pay bounties to Taliban-linked militants for killing American soldiers in Afghanistan. Two days later, The Washington Post reported that the bounty program had resulted in the death of at least one U.S. soldier. The Washington Post reported that "Several people familiar with the matter said it was unclear exactly how many Americans or coalition troops from other countries may have been killed or targeted under the program" and that the intelligence, obtained from U.S. military interrogations of captured Taliban-linked militants, had been "passed up from the U.S. Special Operations forces based in Afghanistan and led to a restricted high-level White House meeting" in late March 2020. The Times reported that American investigators had identified at least one attack they suspected of being thus incentivized: a car bombing on April 8, 2019 outside of Bagram Airfield which killed three Marines and wounded three more, as well as injuring at least six Afghani citizens. On July 9, 2020, Defense Secretary Mark Esper said that Marine Gen. Kenneth McKenzie Jr. and DOD intelligence agencies have not found a link between alleged Russian bounties and that specific attack.

== Reactions ==
=== Afghanistan ===
Afghan President Ashraf Ghani said that the country cannot be the venue for "big power plays" between world leaders, noting that this brought tragedy to the country in the 19th century and the late 20th century.

=== Russia ===
Russia has denied that the bounty program exists, issuing denials through Putin's spokesperson Dmitry Peskov, Russian Security Council Secretary Nikolai Patrushev, Russia's envoy to Afghanistan, Zamir Kabulov, and Russian lawmaker Frants Klintsevich, a member of Federation Council's defense and security committee. Russian diplomats accused the New York Times of spreading fake news and said that the story led to threats against Russian diplomats. The Russian Foreign Ministry said the story demonstrated the "low intellectual abilities of U.S. intelligence propagandists."

Some Russian experts said that "U.S. intelligence about Russia has become completely detached from reality" and that the reports about bounties "serves only to fuel ... a political civil war between President Donald Trump and his opponents in Washington"; Andrei Kortunovru, director of the Russian International Affairs Council, which is affiliated with the Foreign Ministry, said that making payments to the Taliban would harm Russia's interests by hastening a U.S. retreat from the region and increasing the threat of extreme Islamist forces coming to power in Afghanistan, creating instability and insurrection in the former Soviet states of central Asia. However, according to interviews with Afghan officials, U.S. officials, and foreign diplomats who have served in Kabul, the Taliban, Russia and Iran, although historic adversaries, had a shared strategic interest in U.S. withdrawal from Afghanistan, with the Russians viewing the U.S. presence in central Asia as a strategic threat. U.S. intelligence officials said Russia began building a diplomatic channel to the Taliban around 2012. When Russia realized that the US intended leaving Afghanistan, it began working to help the moderate, nationalist factions of the Taliban prevail over the more radical wings. It aimed to move the peace process in a moderate direction through indirect links with the Taliban and, according to Russian experts, may also have "forged more confidential links".

=== Taliban ===
The Taliban denied that the bounty program exists, with Taliban spokesperson Zabiullah Mujahid saying that "our target killings and assassinations were ongoing in years before, and we did it on our own resources" without assistance from intelligence agencies.

=== United States ===
==== Trump administration ====
The U.S. Intelligence Community's assessment led to an interagency meeting of the National Security Council (NSC) at the Trump White House in late March 2020. Government officials said the highest levels of the White House had been briefed on the bounty program and that the program had been included in the President's Daily Brief in late February. A range of responses to Russia were discussed at the meeting, including registering a diplomatic complaint and a series of sanctions, but the Donald Trump administration did not authorize any response. While U.S. Special Representative for Afghanistan Reconciliation Zalmay Khalilzad advocated for directly confronting Russia, officials with the NSC were "more dismissive of taking immediate action". In the months that followed, officials said the bounty program had been "treated as a closely held secret". During the last week of June, expanded briefings were held and the British government was briefed. They were the only coalition member to be formally informed about the intelligence.

Trump and his aides said that he had not been briefed on the intelligence. Director of National Intelligence (DNI) John Ratcliffe and White House press secretary Kayleigh McEnany said that Trump had not received a briefing on the bounty program. Richard Grenell, who was acting DNI until May 2020, said that he had not been made aware of the bounty program. Trump called the bounty program "Fake News" and a hoax, and wrote on Twitter that U.S. intelligence advised him that it had not reported the matter to him or Mike Pence as it did not find the information credible. The New York Times said that "in denying that Mr. Trump was briefed, administration officials have been coy about how it is defining that concept and whether it includes both oral briefings and the President's Daily Brief." Two officials familiar with the matter said that Trump had received a written briefing in the President's Daily Brief on the Russian bounty intelligence in late February; McEnany said that Trump "was not personally briefed on the matter." Trump reportedly often does not read the President's Daily Brief, instead receiving a periodic oral briefing. Current and former intelligence officials said that even during in-person meetings, Trump "is particularly difficult to brief on national security matters" and "often relies instead on conservative media and friends for information."

National Security Adviser Robert O'Brien said that Trump's "career CIA briefer decided not to brief him because it was unverified intelligence" and noted that the U.S. receives many pieces of intelligence each week. McEnany said that "There is no consensus within the intelligence community on these allegations and in effect there are dissenting opinions from some in the intelligence community with regards to the veracity of what's being reported." NSC spokesperson John Ullyot said "the veracity of the underlying allegations continues to be evaluated." However, the New York Times, citing two officials, reported on June 29 that "a description of the intelligence assessment that the Russian unit had carried out the bounties plot was also seen as serious and solid enough to disseminate more broadly across the intelligence community in a May 4 article in the C.I.A.'s World Intelligence Review."

Democratic Congresswoman Elissa Slotkin of Michigan—a former CIA analyst, National Security Council staff member, and intelligence briefer—said that in her experience in the George W. Bush and Obama White Houses, a piece of intelligence such as reported Russian bounties on U.S. troops would be considered sufficiently important to be shared with the president even if there were conflicting views among U.S. intelligence. Slotkin said it would be "deeply concerning" if senior staff failed to take such information to Trump despite his five recent phone calls with Putin. Robert Cardillo, a former senior U.S. intelligence official, and David Priess, a former CIA daily intelligence briefer and an author of a book on presidential intelligence briefings, both said that in previous administrations, presidents "received assessments on issues of potentially vital importance even if they had dissents from some analysts or agencies," and that such dissents were also raised to presidents "to help them understand uncertainties and the analytic process." Priess noted that uncertainties were inherent to the nature of intelligence.

White House Chief of Staff Mark Meadows said that people would "go to jail" over the reports that allege Russia offered bounties to Taliban fighters. Meadows said "We know a crime was perpetrated... Whoever leaked this – they didn't even leak the whole story... We're determined to get to the bottom of it, we don't have any intelligence that would support the reporting." Rudy Giuliani, a member of Trump's legal team, called the leaker a "deep state criminal who committed a serious crime... I can't think of a worse crime. It's not quite treason but comes close."

In June 2020, Mark Milley, the chairman of the Joint Chiefs of Staff, testified before the House Armed Services Committee that, while no link of such a program to U.S. casualties had been found, the U.S. was still investigating and would "take action" if the bounty program is proven to be true. Defense Secretary Mark Esper said that General Kenneth McKenzie, the commander of U.S. Central Command, and General Scott Miller, the top U.S. military commander in Afghanistan, did not think "the reports were credible as they dug into them." McKenzie said that he found no "causative link" between reported bounties to actual U.S. military deaths, but said the reports were "very worrisome" and said a lack of proof is "often true in battlefield intelligence." In September 2020, McKenzie said that the existence of a Russian bounty "has not been proved to a level of certainty that satisfies me" but that the military continued to seek evidence and considered the matter "not a closed issue."

In 2021, political scientist, Ted Galen Carpenter, gave the Russian bounty allegation as an example of media bias. He suggested that it illustrated the US media's broader tendency to make charges against Trump without evidence.

==== Congress ====
Trump never raised the bounty allegations in his conversations with Russian President Vladimir Putin, prompting criticism from Democrats and some Republicans. Many foreign policy experts said that the U.S. administration should have raised the issue with the Russian government, even if definitive proof was lacking. Speaker of the House Nancy Pelosi criticized Trump, saying: "This is as bad as it gets, and yet the president will not confront the Russians on this score, denies being briefed." Pelosi referred to Trump's proposals to bring Russia back into the G8, from which Russia was expelled following the annexation of Crimea on March 24, 2014. Pelosi and Senate Minority Leader Chuck Schumer called for all members of Congress to be briefed on the matter. The White House gave briefings on its position in June 2020 to a group of eight House Republicans allied to the administration. Among congressional Republicans, Senator Lindsey Graham and Representatives Liz Cheney and Dan Crenshaw expressed outrage at the news and asked for an explanation, while Representative Adam Kinzinger called on Trump to stop the alleged "shadow war" Russia is waging. Other congressional Republicans defended Trump, including House Minority Leader Kevin McCarthy.

On July 1, 2020, the House Armed Services Committee overwhelmingly voted in favor of an amendment to restrict Trump's ability to withdraw U.S. troops from Afghanistan. Rep. Seth Moulton stated: "Now we learned that [Trump] was making [peace deal with the Taliban] at the same time as there were bounties on the heads of American troops, American sons and daughters. We clearly need more oversight over what the president is doing in Afghanistan."

==== Biden administration ====
In 2020, former Vice President Joe Biden, while campaigning for the presidency, criticized Trump for failing "to sanction or impose any kind of consequences on Russia for this egregious violation of international law" and said that Trump has "continued his embarrassing campaign of deference and debasing himself before Vladimir Putin". Biden further cited Trump's lack of response as proof that Trump's "entire presidency has been a gift to Putin" and promised if he is elected, "Putin will be confronted and we'll impose serious costs on Russia."

On January 25, 2021, four days after Biden had taken office as president and begun receiving more detailed intelligence briefings, he modulated his comments, referring to "reports of bounties". In April 2021, the administration released a fact sheet saying that CIA analysts had "low to moderate confidence" in the existence of a bounty program but had "high confidence" that Russian military intelligence worked with Afghan criminal networks which "is consistent with Russia's encouraging attacks against U.S. and coalition personnel in Afghanistan". The intelligence was based on "detainee reporting". The document said: "The administration is responding to the reports that Russia encouraged Taliban attacks against U.S. and coalition personnel in Afghanistan based on the best assessments from the Intelligence Community. Given the sensitivity of this matter, which involves the safety and well-being of our forces, it is being handled through diplomatic, military and intelligence channels." White House Press Secretary Jen Psaki called upon "Russia and the Russian government to explain their engagement here".

In April 2021, the Biden administration imposed sanctions against Russian entities and individuals for "carrying out Russian government-directed attempts to influence the 2020 U.S. presidential election, and other acts of disinformation and interference"; for Russian actions in Crimea, and for the SolarWinds cyberespionage attack, but the administration was careful to clarify that the sanctions were not being imposed for bounties.

==== Others ====
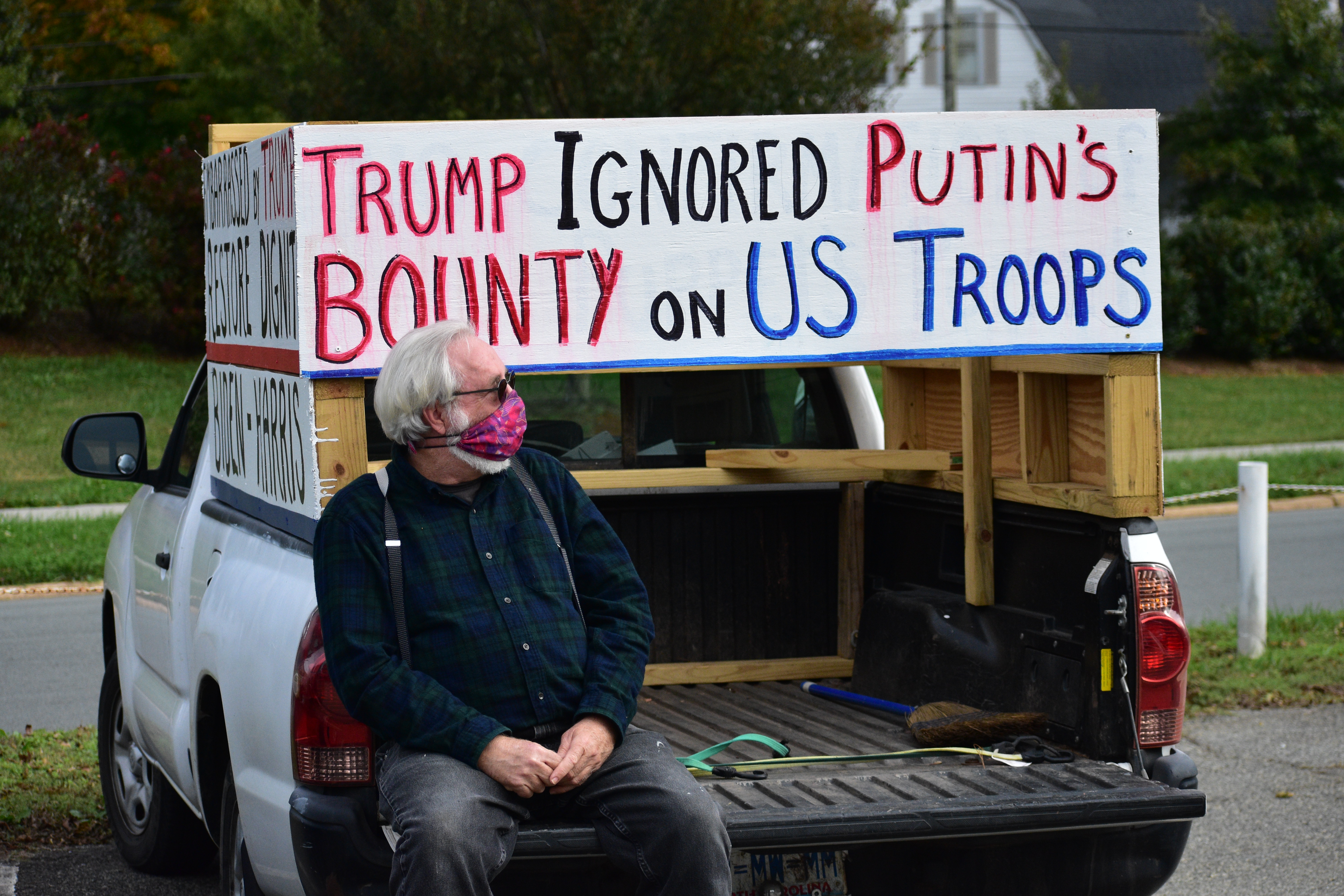
An American anti-Trump protestor with signs about the bounty program

David B. Rivkin wrote that "this kind of scalp-hunting would be an unprecedented escalatory act. Even at the height of the Cold War, both the Soviet Union and the United States refrained from such activity, despite engaging enthusiastically in proxy warfare in theaters around the world." Former Secretary of State Colin Powell argued that the news media overreacted to the reports, saying "What I know is that our military commanders on the ground did not think that it was as serious a problem as the newspapers were reporting".

==== U.S. public opinion ====
A Reuters/Ipsos opinion poll conducted in July 2020 found that 60% of Americans said they found Russian bounty program to be "very" or "somewhat" believable. 54% of those polled wanted to impose more sanctions on Russia, while 9% supported military attacks on the Russian Armed Forces, 29% did not know, and "9% wanted to move on and try to improve relations with Russia".

=== United Kingdom ===
British Prime Minister Boris Johnson was briefed on the alleged bounty program. He has not released the parliamentary Intelligence and Security Committee's report on Russian interference in British politics. Tobias Ellwood, the chair of the House of Commons Commons Defence Select Committee, sought to raise an urgent question in the House of Commons on the matter, to obtain an explanation from a government minister.

== Other alleged bounty programs targeting U.S. soldiers ==
Iran was accused of offering bounties for American soldiers later in 2020. U.S. intelligence assessed that Iran (which has often used proxies to carry out attacks in the Middle East) had made payments to the Haqqani network linked to at least six of the network's attacks in 2019 including the sophisticated attack at Bagram Air Base, Afghanistan, on December 11, 2019. U.S. intelligence said that the Haqqani network would probably target U.S. troops even without payment, but that funding associated with the Bagram attack "probably incentivizes future high-profile attacks on US and Coalition forces." According to CNN, the Trump's administration has "never mentioned Iran's connection to the bombing, an omission current and former officials said was connected to the broader prioritization" of the U.S.-Taliban peace agreement and withdrawal from Afghanistan. The alleged Iran-Taliban ties were cited as part of the justification for the assassination of Qasem Soleimani by the U.S..

Separately, there have been uncorroborated reports that the Chinese government offered bounties to pay for attacks on U.S. troops in Afghanistan. It was not clear whether any intelligence indicated that any bounties were actually paid or whether any associated attacks were attempted. U.S. President Donald Trump was reportedly briefed about the unverified intelligence, despite dismissing reports (deemed more credible by U.S. security experts) about Russian bounties that had been offered.

== See also ==
- United States military casualties in the War in Afghanistan
- Afghanistan Papers
- Afghan War documents leak
- Operation Cyclone
