= Ian Smail =

British astrophysicist

- Born: Ian Robert Smail
- Education: Emmanuel College, Cambridge (MA); Durham University (PhD)
- Awards: Philip Leverhulme Prize (2001); Royal Society Wolfson Research Merit Award (2013); Herschel Medal (2025)
- Scientific career
- Workplaces: Durham University
- Thesis: Gravitational lensing by rich clusters of galaxies (1993)
- Doctoral advisor: Richard Ellis
- Doctoral students: Mark Swinbank; Kevin Pimbblet; Graham Smith
- Website: astro.dur.ac.uk/~irs/

Ian Robert Smail is a British astrophysicist. He is Emeritus Professor of Physics at the Durham University Department of Physics, based in the Centre for Extragalactic Astronomy, itself part of the Ogden Centre for Fundamental Physics.

He has been ranked as one of the most highly-cited researchers in Space Sciences.

== Education ==
Smail attended Emmanuel College, Cambridge on a Hooper Scholarship, where he completed the Natural Sciences tripos, graduating with an M.A. in Physics and Theoretical Physics in 1989. He carried out his doctoral studies in Astronomy (1989–1993) at Durham University (University College), supervised by Richard Ellis.

== Career ==
From 1993 to 1995 Smail was a NATO Advanced Research Fellow in the Physics, Maths and Astronomy Division at Caltech, and subsequently a Carnegie Fellow at the Observatories of the Carnegie Institution for Science. He returned to Durham in 1996 to become a PPARC Advanced Research Fellow (1996–1998) and from 1998 onwards a Royal Society University Research Fellow in the Department of Physics. He was made a Professor in 2004.

=== Awards and recognition ===
In 2001, Smail, alongside Durham colleague Ben Moore, was one of the first recipients of the Philip Leverhulme Prize in the Astronomy and Astrophysics category. He received a Royal Society Wolfson Research Merit Award in 2013, and was named by Thomson Reuters as one of the world's most influential scientific minds the following year. In 2025 he was awarded the Herschel Medal of the Royal Astronomical Society.
