= Zarepour =

Zarepour (Persian: زارع پور) is a surname. Notable people with the surname include:

- Eisa Zarepour (born 1980), Iranian conservative politician and former minister of information and communications technology
- Mohammad Saleh Zarepour, Iranian philosopher
