= Sarah Stewart Johnson =

American astronomer and planetary scientist

- Born: Kentucky
- Education: Washington University in St. Louis; Oxford University; Massachusetts Institute of Technology
- Scientific career
- Fields: Biology; Geochemistry; Astronomy; Astrobiology; Planetary science
- Workplaces: Georgetown University; Harvard University
- Thesis: Mars in the late Noachian : evolution of a habitable surface environment (2008)
- Doctoral advisor: Maria Zuber

Sarah Stewart Johnson is an American biologist, geochemist, astronomer and planetary scientist. She joined Georgetown University in 2014 and is currently the Provost's Distinguished Associate Professor of Biology and the Science, Technology, and International Affairs program in the School of Foreign Service.

== Early life and education ==
Johnson was born in Kentucky and grew up in Lexington. She received her bachelor's degree from Washington University in St. Louis, where she was an Arthur Holly Compton Fellow and majored in math and environmental studies. During college, she won a Goldwater Scholarship and a Truman Scholarship. Johnson then attended Oxford as a Rhodes Scholar where she earned bachelor's and master's degrees. In 2008, she completed a PhD in planetary science at MIT.

== Career ==
Johnson was a Junior Fellow at Harvard University from 2008 to 2009 and 2011 to 2013. She was a White House Fellow working for the President's Science Advisor, under the Obama administration from 2009 to 2011. Johnson became a faculty member at Georgetown in 2014. Her work involves the use of analog environments to study the habitability of the surface and subsurface of Mars and icy moons. Her lab at Georgetown is currently focused on the detection of agnostic biosignatures, sometimes referred to as "life as we don't know it". She is a visiting scientist at NASA's Goddard Space Flight Center with the Planetary Environments lab. She participated in the Curiosity, Opportunity, and Spirit missions.

== Bibliography ==
- The Sirens of Mars

== Honors ==
- Desert Writers Award (2013)
- White House Fellow (2009)
- Harvard Junior Fellow (2008)
- Hugh Hampton Young Fellowship, MIT (2008)
- National Science Foundation Graduate Research Fellowship
- Rhodes Scholarship (2001)
- Truman Scholarship (2000)
- Goldwater Scholarship (1999)
- Arthur Holly Compton Fellowship, Washington University in St. Louis (1997)
