= Stephen Eales =

British astrophysicist

Stephen Eales is a professor of astrophysics at Cardiff University, where he is currently head of the Astronomy Group. In 2015, he was awarded the Herschel Medal from the Royal Astronomical Society for outstanding contributions to observational astrophysics. He also writes articles and books about astronomy.

== Research ==
His main research field is the new field of submillimetre astronomy, in particular using submillimetre observations to investigate the origin and evolution of galaxies. He has led a number of large submillimetre observing programmes. In particular, with Loretta Dunne he led the Herschel ATLAS the largest survey of the extragalactic sky carried out with the Herschel Space Observatory.

== Bibliography ==
- Origins – how the planets, stars, galaxies and the universe began (Springer 2007 ISBN 1-84628-401-5).
- Planets and Planetary Systems (textbook) (John Wiley and Sons 2009, ISBN 978-0-470-01693-0)
