= Natalia Ares =

Argentine quantum scientist

Natalia Ares is an Argentine quantum scientist, an associate professor in the Department of Engineering Science at the University of Oxford, a tutorial fellow of New College, Oxford, a Royal Society University Research Fellow, and head of the Quantum Device Lab at Oxford. Her research interests include the control theory and tuning of quantum computing devices, the use of machine learning to characterize quantum dots, and tradeoffs between the accuracy of clocks and the amount of entropy they generate.

== Education and career ==
Ares is originally from Argentina, and became interested in physics through a high school science outreach program. She was a physics student at the University of Buenos Aires, where her master's thesis concerned quantum chaos. She then went to France for doctoral study in nanophysics, in the Laboratoire de transport électronique quantique et supraconductivité of the French Alternative Energies and Atomic Energy Commission (CEA) and Grenoble Alpes University. She completed her Ph.D. in 2013 through Grenoble Alpes University, with the dissertation Transport électronique et contrôle du spin dans les boîtes quantiques auto-organisées de SiGe, directed jointly by François Lefloch and Silvano De Franceschi.

She joined Oxford in 2013 as a postdoctoral researcher, initially in the Materials Department, and remained at Oxford with the support of a Marie Skłodowska Curie Fellowship and Royal Society University Research Fellowship.

She is also cofounder of a spinout company to commercialize her research, Quantrolox.

== Recognition ==
Ares was a 2024 recipient of the Philip Leverhulme Prize.
