= George Isaak =

Australian physicist

George Richard Isaak (7 March 1933 – 5 June 2005) was a Polish Australian physicist, an important figure in the development of helio- and asteroseismology.

Isaak was born in Poland on 7 March 1933. His family moved to Germany after the Second World War and to Australia in 1950. Isaak studied at the University of Melbourne, achieving his Bachelor of Science (BSc) in 1955 and Master of Science (MSc) in 1958. A spell in industry followed, in which Isaak worked for ICI in Australia 1959-1960 during which time he patented a spectrophotometer for very high-resolution optical spectroscopy, using the resonant scattering of light by atoms. In 1961 Isaak returned to science at the University of Birmingham from whom he received his PhD in 1966, and where he stayed until his retirement in 1996, at this time taking up an Adjunct Faculty position at the University of Minnesota. Isaak remained active in scientific endeavors until the time of his death. Isaak married once to Umit, a fellow physicist at Birmingham in 1964.

Isaak's work in resonant-scattering spectroscopy observations of the Sun directly led to the first detection (1979) of the Solar five-minute oscillations as a global phenomenon, directly leading to the science of Helioseismology - the study of the solar interior by analysis of the properties of these oscillations. Isaak led the High Resolution Optical Spectroscopy (HiROS) Group at the University of Birmingham, establishing the six-site global BiSON network for helioseismic observations. In many ways ahead of his time, Isaak also devoted efforts to observation of these 'solar like' observations in other stars, a science now known as Asteroseismology.

== Awards ==
- Max Born Prize - Institute of Physics and German Physical Society, 1985.
- Hughes Medal - Royal Society, 1993
- Herschel Medal - Royal Astronomical Society, 1996
