= James Dunlop (astronomer) =

British astronomer

Jim Dunlop FRS FRSE FInstP
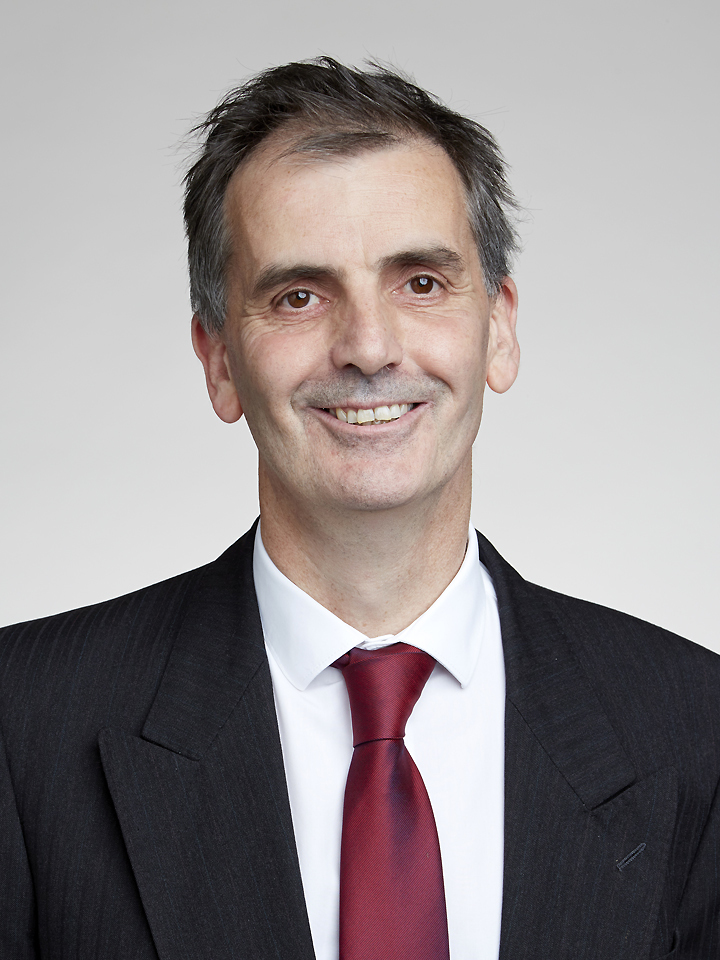
- Dunlop in 2016
- Born: James Scott Dunlop
- Education: University of Dundee (BSc); University of Edinburgh (PhD)
- Awards: George Darwin Lectureship (2014); Herschel Medal (2016)
- Scientific career
- Fields: Astronomy; Astrophysics
- Workplaces: Royal Observatory, Edinburgh; University of Edinburgh; Liverpool John Moores University
- Thesis: The high-redshift evolution of radio galaxies and quasars (1987)
- Website: roe.ac.uk/~jsd/; roe.ac.uk/ifa/people/jsd.html; www.ph.ed.ac.uk/people/james-dunlop

James Scott Dunlop is a Scottish astronomer and academic. He is Professor of Extragalactic Astronomy at the Institute for Astronomy, an institute within the School of Physics and Astronomy at the University of Edinburgh.

== Education and early life ==
Dunlop was born and raised on the Clyde coast. He studied physics at the University of Dundee, before moving to the University of Edinburgh where he was awarded a PhD in astrophysics in 1988 for research on redshift in radio galaxies and quasars.

== Career and research ==
After seven years working in England (where he helped establish the astrophysics group at Liverpool John Moores University) he returned to Edinburgh and has worked at the Royal Observatory, Edinburgh ever since, apart from two periods in Vancouver. From 2004-2008 and 2013-2019 he was Head of the University of Edinburgh's Institute for Astronomy (IfA), and in 2019 he became Head of Edinburgh's School of Physics & Astronomy.

Dunlop is an observational cosmologist who uses the world's largest telescopes (including telescopes in space such as the Hubble Space Telescope) to study the chronology of the universe back to the formation and birth of the first galaxies. His research has been funded by the Science and Technology Facilities Council (STFC), a Royal Society Wolfson Research Merit Award and the European Research Council.

=== Awards and honours ===
Dunlop was elected a Fellow of the Royal Society (FRS) in 2016, a Fellow of the Institute of Physics (FInstP), and a Fellow of the Royal Society of Edinburgh (FRSE) in 2007. He received the George Darwin Lectureship in 2014 and the Herschel Medal in 2016, both from the Royal Astronomical Society.
