= Hayley Fowler =

British Professor of Climate Change Impacts

Hayley Fowler FRS
- Citizenship: British
- Awards: Philip Leverhulme Prize 2011; Sergey Soloviev Medal 2023

Academic background
- Education: University of Cambridge (BA); Newcastle University (MSc, PhD)
- Thesis: The impacts of climatic change and variability on water resources in Yorkshire (2000)
- Doctoral advisor: Chris Kilsby; P. Enda O'Connell

Academic work
- Discipline: Hydrology
- Sub-discipline: climate change, hydroclimatology
- Institutions: Newcastle University

Hayley J. Fowler FRS is a Professor of Climate Change Impacts in the School of Engineering at Newcastle University.

== Education ==
Fowler attended Poynton High School in Cheshire, North West England from 1986 to 1993. She studied for a Bachelor of Arts in Geography at Cambridge University (1996), where she was awarded the 1996 Philip Lake Prize as the Best Physical Geographer. She then moved to Newcastle University, where she obtained a Master of Science in Water Resource Systems Engineering (1997) and a Doctor of Philosophy in Civil Engineering (2000).

== Career ==
After completing her PhD, Fowler was a research associate at Newcastle University, after which she held a Natural Environment Research Council (NERC) Postdoctoral Fellowship from 2006 to 2010, examining the links between atmospheric circulation patterns, extreme rainfall and flooding. She was appointed Reader in Climate Change Impacts in 2008, and was promoted as a professor in 2012. In 2011 she was awarded a Philip Leverhulme Prize for her work on Climate change impacts on rainfall extremes and water resource systems, and a Royal Society Wolfson Research Merit Award in 2014.

She has also held a visiting scientist position at the Institute for the Study of Science and Environment, NCAR, Boulder, Colorado for various periods between 2006 and 2008. She was secretary of the British Hydrological Society from 2006 to 2008. She has been a member of the NERC Peer Review College since 2010, and Core panel member of NERC Panel C since 2013. She is on the International Advisory Board of WIRES Water, and is an Associate Editor for the journals Frontiers in Interdisciplinary Climate Studies and PLOS ONE.

In August 2018 she was elected a Fellow of the American Geophysical Union. In 2023 she was awarded the Sergey Soloviev Medal by the European Geosciences Union for her work on the natural hazards principles around extreme rainfall and flash flooding.

== Research ==
Fowler has worked for over a decade analysing the impacts of climate change and variability on hydrological and water resource systems. She examines trends in extremes and future projections and impacts on flood and drought risk. She has been a key figure in the analysis of climate model outputs and development of downscaling techniques. Her research has been funded by NERC, Defra, and EPSRC, including a European Research Council Consolidator Grant 2014–2019.
