= Jemma Wadham =

British glacial biogeochemist

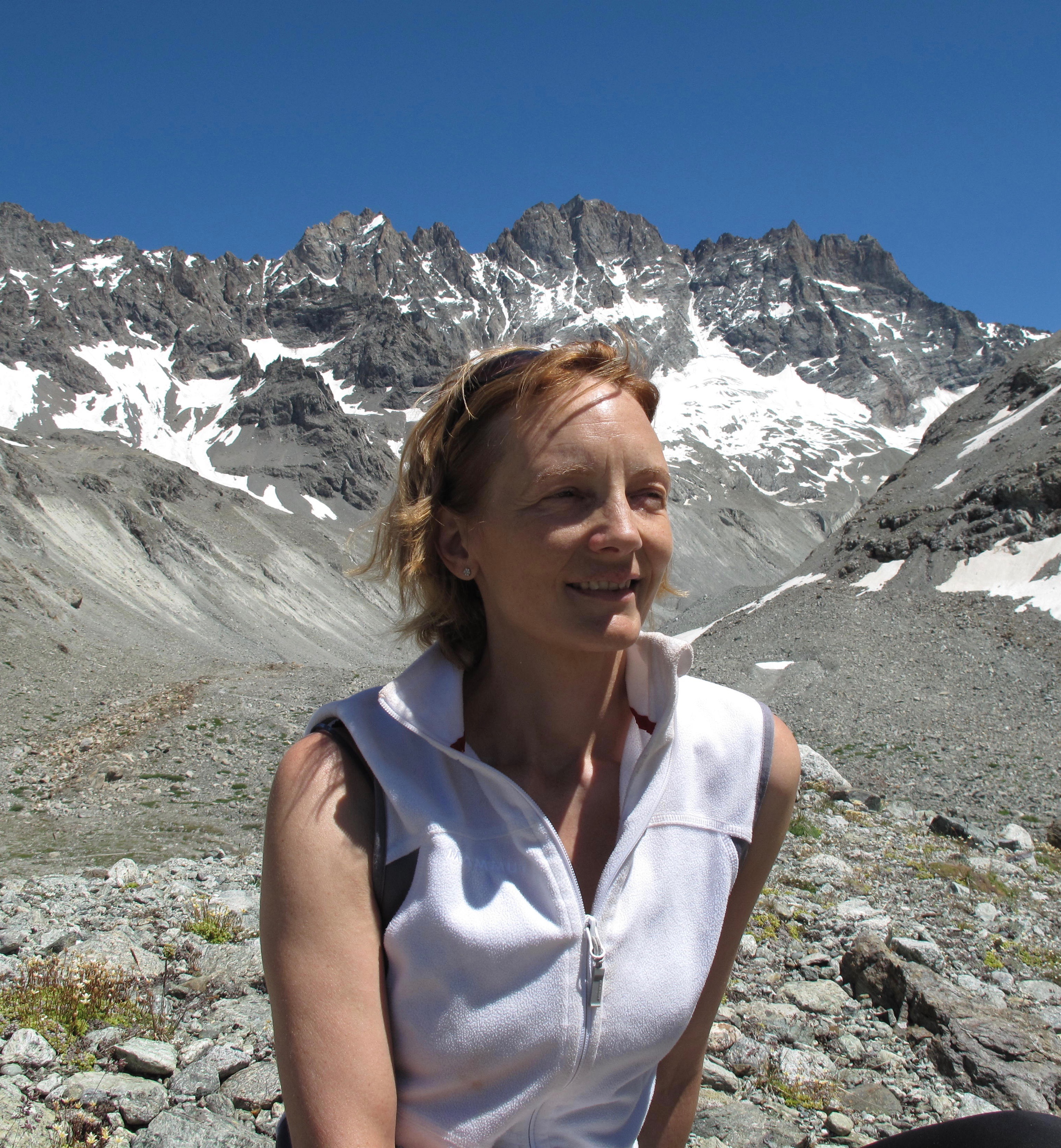
- Jemma Wadham at the Arolla Glacier
- Education: MA University of Cambridge; PhD University of Bristol
- Awards: Philip Leverhulme Prize (2007)
- Scientific career
- Fields: Glaciology
- Workplaces: University of Bristol
- Website: https://www.jemmawadham.com/

Jemma Louise Wadham is a British glacier biogeochemist.

== Early life and education ==
Wadham completed her BA and MA in physical geography at Cambridge University, and then completed her PhD in glaciology at the University of Bristol in 1998.

== Career ==
Wadham undertook a short post-doctoral research post at the University of Leeds before returning to the University of Bristol to take up a post at the Bristol Glaciology Centre.

Wadham researches glacial ecosystems and investigates their impact on biogeochemical processes. She has worked in the polar regions, including the Antarctic and the Greenland ice sheets. This has led to more than 90 articles and a textbook on Antarctic lakes.

Wadham has been involved with the International Scientific Committee on Antarctic Research, the Scientific Committee on Antarctic Research (SCAR) and subglacial science in Antarctica. She has served on the Lake Ellsworth Exploration Steering Committee and is a contributor to this subglacial lake exploration programme.

In 2012, Wadham's team at the University of Bristol used computer models to predict the amount of trapped methane under ice sheets and discovered 400 billion metric tons of carbon beneath.

She is one of few women working on technology development for exploring subglacial lakes. Her work in Greenland focused on the dynamics of ice sheets and their contribution to global biogeochemical cycles.

In 2022, Wadham and her collaborator Dr. Monica Winsborrow were awarded €15 million to direct the Centre for ice, Cryosphere, Carbon and Climate (iC3), a ten-year Norwegian Centre of Research Excellence funded by the Norwegian Research Council that will run from 2023 to 2033. iC3 is located at the University of Tromsø. Furthermore, she was inducted into the Norwegian Academy of Science and Letters in 2024.

== Ice Rivers ==
In 2021, Wadham published a trade book, Ice Rivers, which tells the story of glaciers and their place on a changing planet, alongside the authors' own story of travel and discovery. Reviewers commended the book for its 'outstanding introduction to glaciers', and for its insights into the life of a glaciologist.

== Awards and honours ==
She was awarded a Philip Leverhulme Prize in October 2007 for her international contribution to polar science.
