= Keith Horne (astronomer) =

American astronomer

Keith Douglas Horne FRSE is an American astronomer. He is Emeritus Professor in the School of Physics and Astronomy at the University of St Andrews.

Horne completed his undergraduate degree in Mathematics and Physics at Pomona College in 1977, and earned his doctorate from Caltech in 1983. His doctoral advisor was John Beverley Oke. In 2010, he was part of an international team that discovered the Hot Jupiter exoplanet Qatar-1b.

Horne was the 2004 recipient of the Herschel Medal, which he received for his observational astronomy work on cataclysmic variable stars.
