= James H. Hough =

British astronomer

James Harley Hough (born 1943) is a British astronomer. Hough was Director of Astronomy Research at the University of Hertfordshire.

In 1998, he received the Daiwa Adrian Prize for promoting scientific collaboration between the United Kingdom and Japan. He was awarded the 2010 Herschel Medal for research on astronomical polarimetry.
