= Jayne Birkby =

British astrophysicist and exoplanet researcher

- Education: Durham University (MSci); University of Cambridge (PhD)
- Known for: Research on exoplanet atmospheres and high-resolution spectroscopy
- Awards: Philip Leverhulme Prize (2021); European Research Council Starting Grant
- Scientific career
- Fields: Astrophysics, exoplanetary science
- Workplaces: University of Oxford
- Website: www.physics.ox.ac.uk/our-people/birkby

Jayne Louise Birkby is a British astrophysicist and a Professor of Astrophysics at the University of Oxford and a Tutorial Fellow in Physics at Brasenose College, Oxford.

Birkby studied Physics and Astronomy at Durham University, graduating with an MSci in 2007, and received a PhD in Astrophysics from the University of Cambridge. She subsequently held research positions at Leiden University and Harvard University, where she was a NASA Sagan Postdoctoral Fellow, before becoming an assistant professor at the University of Amsterdam. She joined Oxford in 2020 and became Professor of Astrophysics in 2025.

In 2024, she appeared on In Our Time, discussing the habitability of planets.

== Current research ==
Her current research focuses on exoplanet atmospheres, high-resolution spectroscopy, low-mass stars, and the development of astronomical instrumentation.

She uses high-resolution observations from ground-based optical and infrared telescopes to investigate the chemical composition and atmospheric dynamics of planets orbiting other stars. In 2013, she was a member of the team that reported the detection of water absorption in the atmosphere of the hot Jupiter HD 189733 b.

Birkby received a Philip Leverhulme Prize in 2021 and was a finalist for the 2024 United Kingdom Blavatnik Awards for Young Scientists.

== See also ==
- Exoplanet
- Exoplanet atmosphere
- Astronomical spectroscopy
- Astrobiology
