= Tom Marsh (astronomer) =

British astronomer (1961–2022)

- Marsh in 2010
- Born: Thomas Richard Marsh; 17 November 1961; Old Windsor, Berkshire, England
- Disappeared: 16 September 2022; Atacama Desert, Chile
- Died: c. 16 September 2022 (aged 60); Atacama Desert, Chile
- Body discovered: 10 November 2022; Atacama Desert, Chile
- Occupations: Astronomer; astrophysicist
- Employers: Royal Observatory, Greenwich; Space Telescope Science Institute; University of Oxford; University of Southampton; University of Warwick
- Awards: Herschel Medal, 2018

Academic background
- Education: Queens' College, Cambridge

Thomas Richard Marsh (17 November 1961 – c. 16 September 2022) was a British astronomer and astrophysicist. His research topics included the accretion and evolution of binary star systems. He was awarded the Herschel Medal in 2018 for his development of doppler tomography which he used to study compact binary stars.

== International and public engagement ==
Marsh worked to bring astronomy to less affluent countries and maintained a strong link with Thailand. This enabled astronomers there to use his high-speed cameras and be part of these international endeavours. He also worked with amateur astronomers, and one of his high-profile papers resulted from an initial observation by an amateur astronomer that he followed up.

== Disappearance ==
In 2022, Marsh was a visiting astronomer at the European Southern Observatory (ESO).

On 14 September, Marsh arrived with a PhD student from the University of Warwick at the ESO La Silla Observatory for a 4-day observing visit. On 16 September, Marsh disappeared during either a hike or observing run at the La Silla. The search for Marsh was extended when his mobile phone and various articles of clothing were found in the Atacama Desert.

On 10 November, Marsh's body was found approximately two miles from La Silla by the Grupo de Operaciones Policiales Especiales on a steep, rocky slope next to a cluster of rocks in the Atacama Desert. Marsh was found dressed only from the waist down.

=== Inquest ===
A coroner's inquest into the nature of Marsh's death is due to take place on 27 March 2026 at Warwickshire County Council.

== Legacy ==
In 2024, a memorial for Marsh was erected at the La Silla Observatory on the road between the New Technology Telescope and the Swedish-ESO Submillimetre Telescope.

== See also ==
- List of solved missing person cases (2020s)
