= Sophie T. Ambler =

Historian

- Education: King's College London
- Occupation: Medieval historian, university teacher
- Employer: Lancaster University; University of East Anglia
- Awards: Philip Leverhulme Prize (2020); Society of Antiquaries of London (2026)

Sophie Ambler FSA, FRHistS is a medieval historian, focussing on politics, ethics, and warfare, often through the lens of the Crusades. She undertook her PhD at King's College London, supervised by David A. Carpenter.

== Career ==
Between 2012 and 2013, Ambler worked as a Research Associate on the AHRC-funded 'Breaking of Britain' project, with a focus on the 'People of Northern England' project. Ambler subsequently joined the Magna Carta Project as a Research Associate, working on the project at the University of East Anglia from 2013 to 2015.

Ambler joined Lancaster University as a Lecturer in 2017, and since 2021 she has been Reader in Central & Later Medieval History. In 2020, Ambler was one of the recipients of the Philip Leverhulme Prize. She frequently contributes to TV and radio, like her piece on the Second Barons' War as part of In Our Time.

In 2023, Ambler secured funding from the Castle Studies Trust to investigate the medieval site of Lowther Castle Stead in Cumbria and its associated village. The project aimed to investigate the castle's foundation through the first geophysical surveys and excavations at the castle. She is a fellow of the Royal Historical Society and the Society of Antiquaries of London.

== Selected works ==
Books

- — (2016). Bishops in the Political Community of England, 1213−1272. Oxford: Oxford University Press. ISBN 978-0-19-875402-2. OCLC 955312859. OL 27415575M. Wikidata Q107305460.
- — (2019), The Song of Simon de Montfort: The Life and Death of a Medieval Revolutionary, Oxford, OL 25425627W, Wikidata Q72932472
- — (2019), The Song of Simon de Montfort: England's First Revolutionary and the Death of Chivalry, London, OL 22136944W, Wikidata Q107669769
