= Michael Kramer (astronomer) =

German radio astronomer and astrophysicist

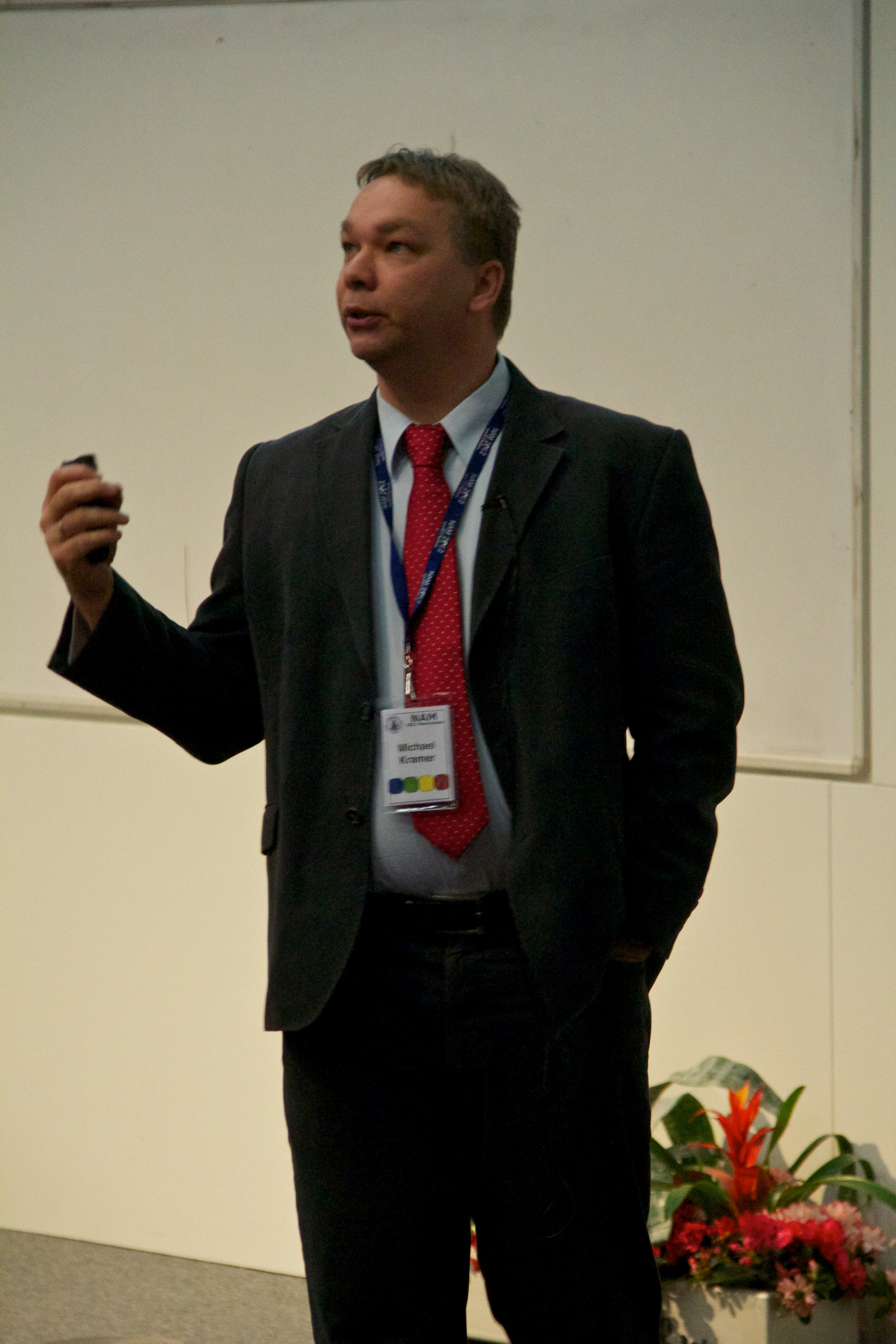
Michael Kramer at RAS NAM 2012

Michael Kramer (born 1967 in Cologne) is a German radio astronomer and astrophysicist. He currently serves as a Director at the Max Planck Institute for Radio Astronomy in Bonn. He is also a professor at the University of Manchester and an Honorary Professor at the University of Bonn.

== Awards ==
The Royal Astronomical Society, London, honoured Michael Kramer with the 2013 Herschel Medal for his work in the field of gravitational physics.

He gave the 2016 George Darwin lecture with the title, `Probing Einstein's Universe and its physics – the joy of being curious.’

He was one of the recipients of the 2020 Breakthrough Prize in Fundamental Physics, as a member of the Event Horizon Telescope Collaboration.

== Selected publications ==
- D Thornton; B Stappers; Matthew Bailes; et al. (2013). "A population of fast radio bursts at cosmological distances". Science. 341 (6141): 53–56. arXiv:1307.1628. Bibcode:2013Sci...341...53T. doi:10.1126/science.1236789. PMID 23828936. Wikidata Q34037440.
- John Antoniadis; Paulo C C Freire; Norbert Wex; et al. (2013). "A massive pulsar in a compact relativistic binary". Science. 340 (6131): 448, 1233232. arXiv:1304.6875. Bibcode:2013Sci...340..448A. doi:10.1126/science.1233232. PMID 23620056. Wikidata Q34341376.
- M. Kramer; I. H. Stairs; R. N. Manchester; et al. (2006). "Tests of general relativity from timing the double pulsar". Science. 314 (5796): 97–102. arXiv:astro-ph/0609417. Bibcode:2006Sci...314...97K. doi:10.1126/science.1132305. PMID 16973838. Wikidata Q34566230.
