= Camilla Speller =

Canadian archaeologist and researcher

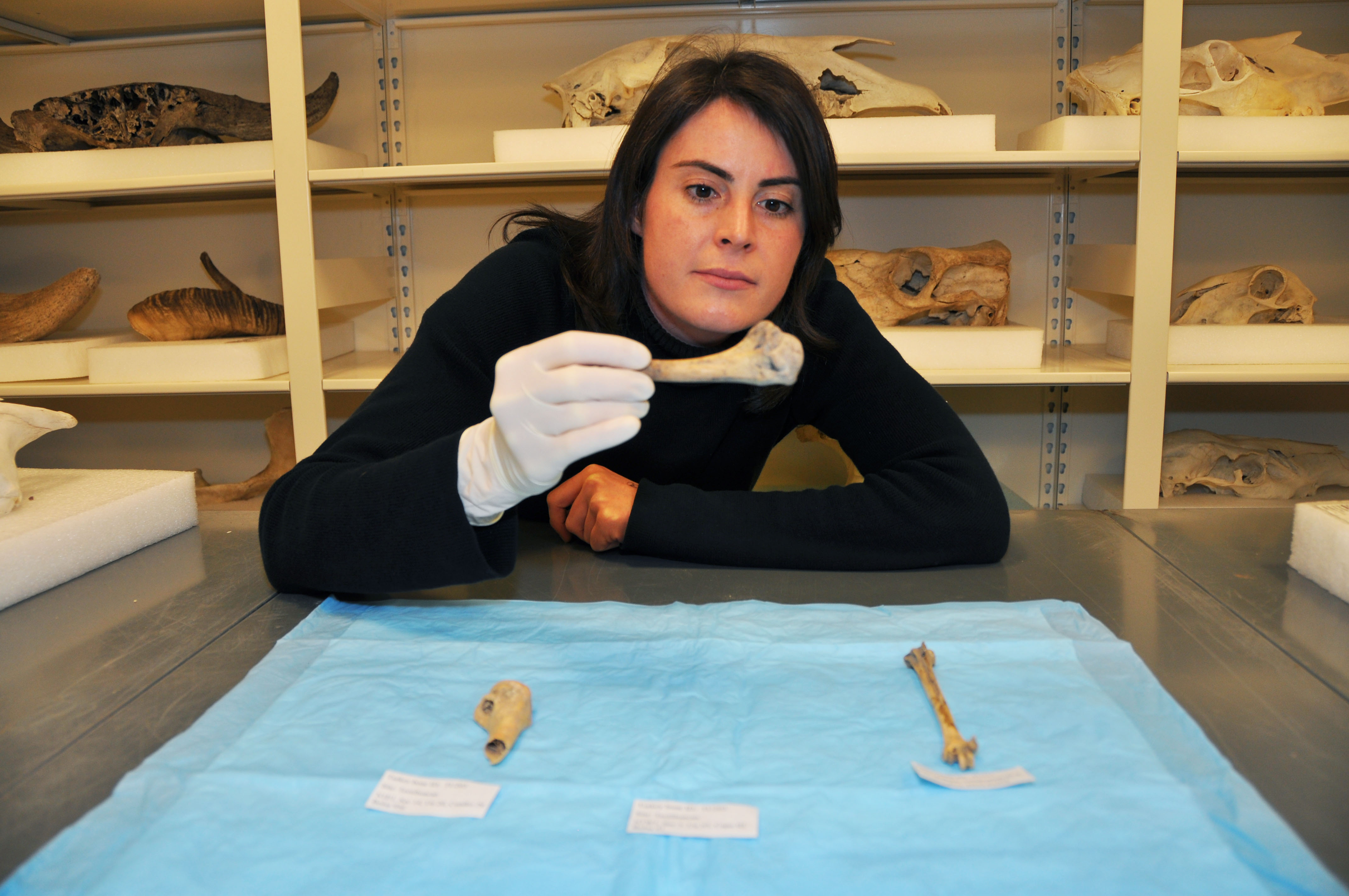
- Camilla Speller in 2010
- Occupation: Professor of Anthropological Archaeology
- Awards: Philip Leverhulme Prize 2016

Academic background
- Education: University of Calgary; PhD., Simon Fraser University
- Thesis: Investigating turkey (Meleagris gallopavo) domestication in the Southwest United States through ancient DNA analysis (2009)

Academic work
- Discipline: Anthropology
- Sub-discipline: Archaeology
- Institutions: University of British Columbia, University of York, University of Calgary

Camilla F. Speller is a biomolecular archaeologist, Assistant Professor in Anthropological Archaeology at the University of British Columbia Department of Anthropology.

== Education ==
Speller obtained her BA from the University of Calgary with a double major in archaeology and biological anthropology. She completed her MA at Simon Fraser University in 2005, using aDNA analysis to examine the distribution of salmon species at the Northwest Plateau site of Keatley Creek in British Columbia Canada. She completed her PhD, completed at Simon Fraser in 2009 with a dissertation that applied ancient DNA techniques to study the human use of wild and domestic turkeys in the Southwest United States.

== Career and research ==
In 2010 Speller was awarded a SSHRC postdoctoral fellowship at the University of Calgary to continue her research on North American turkey domestication. In 2012 she was awarded a Marie Curie Fellowship to train at the University of York BioArCh Centre. During this time she applied ZooMS and ancient DNA analysis to address questions concerning historic whale exploitation. She was appointed as a Lecturer in Archaeology at the University of York in 2014 where she led the ancient genetics group at BioArCh until 2018, when she moved to the Department of Anthropology at UBC. She currently directs research in the Ancient DNA and Proteins (ADαPT) Facility located within the Museum of Anthropology at UBC.

Speller applies biomolecular techniques to address questions related to human-environment relationships in the past and present, ancient diets, and how humans have shaped their physical environment, from broad ecosystem impacts to the micro-environment of the human body, including ancient microbiomes. She uses ancient DNA analysis, ancient proteins and collagen peptide mass fingerprinting (ZooMS).

== Prizes and awards ==
Speller was the recipient of a Philip Leverhulme Prize in Archaeology in 2016, and in 2010 was awarded the Gold Governor General's Academic Medal for her PhD dissertation on North American Turkey domestication.

== Selected publications ==
- Hendy J, Warinner C, Bouwman A, Collins MJ, Fiddyment S, Fischer R, Hagan R, Hofman CA, Holst M, Chaves E, Klaus L, Larson G, Mackie M, McGrath K, Mundorff AZ, Radini A, Rao H, Trachsel C, Velsko IM, Speller CF (2018) Proteomic evidence of dietary sources in ancient dental calculus, Proceedings of the Royal Society B, 20180977
- Hendy J, Welker F, Demarchi B, Speller C, Warinner C, Collins MJ (2018) A Guide to Ancient Proteins, Nature Ecology and Evolution, 2, 791–799.
- Mackie, Meaghan; Hendy, Jessica; Lowe, Abigail D.; Sperduti, Alessandra; Holst, Malin; Collins, Matthew J.; Speller, Camilla F. (2017), "Preservation of the metaproteome: Variability of protein preservation in ancient dental calculus", STAR: Science & Technology of Archaeological Research, 3 (1): 74–86, Bibcode:2017STAR....3...58M, doi:10.1080/20548923.2017.1361629, PMC 5633013, PMID 29098079
- Green, Eleanor Joan; Speller, Camilla F. (2017), "Novel substrates as sources of ancient DNA: prospects and hurdles", Genes, 8 (7): 180, doi:10.3390/genes8070180, PMC 5541313, PMID 28703741
- Speller C, ven den Hurk Y, Charperntiere A, Rodrigues A, Gardeisen A, Wilkens B, McGrath K, Rowsell K, Spindler L, Collins M, Hofreiter M (2016) Barcoding the largest animals on earth: on-going challenges and molecular solutions in the taxonomic identification of ancient cetaceans, Philosophical Transactions of the Royal Society B, 371: 20150332
- Speller, Camilla F.; Hauser, Lorenz; Lepofsky, Dana; Moore, Jason; Rodrigues, Antonia T.; Moss, Madonna L.; McKechnie, Iain; Yang, Dongya Y. (2012), "High Potential for Using DNA from Ancient Herring Bones to Inform Modern Fisheries Management and Conservation", PLOS ONE, 7 (11) e51122, Bibcode:2012PLoSO...751122S, doi:10.1371/journal.pone.0051122, PMC 3511397, PMID 23226474
