= John Antoniadis =

Greek astrophysicist

- Ιωάννης Αντωνιάδης
- Born: 11 August 1986 (age 40); Didymoteicho
- Education: Aristotle University of Thessaloniki; University of Bonn
- Known for: Pulsars
- Scientific career
- Workplaces: Max Planck Institute for Radio Astronomy; University of Toronto; Dunlap Institute for Astronomy & Astrophysics
- Thesis: Multi-wavelength studies of pulsars and their companions (2013)
- Doctoral advisor: Michael Kramer
- Website: http://johnantoniadis.com/

John Antoniadis (born August 11, 1986) also known as Ioannis Antoniadis (Greek: Ιωάννης Αντωνιάδης) is a Greek astrophysicist. He is mostly known for his research of radio pulsars, a type of rapidly rotating neutron stars.

== Education ==
Antoniadis was born in Didymoteicho, Greece. He obtained his bachelor's degree in Physics from the University of Thessaloniki in 2009 and his Ph.D. in 2013 at the University of Bonn. under the supervision of Michael Kramer.

== Career ==
From 2014 to 2016 Antoniadis was a Dunlap Fellow at the Dunlap Institute for Astronomy & Astrophysics in Toronto, Canada. From 2017 until 2021 he was working at the Max Planck Institute for Radio Astronomy in Bonn, Germany. In 2021 he joined the Institute of Astrophysics - FORTH as a tenure track researcher.

== Research ==
In 2013 he led the team that measured the mass of the neutron star in the binary system PSR J0348+0432. This measurement confirmed the existence of supermassive neutron stars and made possible a new test of Einstein's theory of general relativity. In 2016, Antoniadis together with André van Staden, a South African amateur astronomer, announced the discovery of magnetic activity on the surface of the companion star of a millisecond pulsar.

In 2014, Antoniadis was awarded the Otto Hahn Medal by the Max Planck Society, the Dissertation Prize of the Deutsche Physikalische Gesellschaft and the Best Thesis Award from the Foundation for Physics and Astronomy in Bonn. His thesis was included in the “outstanding theses” series by Springer Nature

In 2016 he received the John Charles Polanyi Prize for Physics by the Council of Ontario Universities.
