= Mark Swinbank =

British astronomer

- Born: Anthony Mark Swinbank; April 27, 1980 (age 46); Teesside
- Education: Durham University (MSci, PhD)
- Known for: Observational studies of galaxy formation and evolution
- Awards: Philip Leverhulme Prize (2013)
- Scientific career
- Fields: Observational cosmology
- Workplaces: Durham University
- Thesis: Mapping the dynamics, star-formation rates, and chemical properties of galaxies with integral field spectroscopy (2005)
- Doctoral advisor: Richard Bower and Ian Smail
- Website: astro.dur.ac.uk/~ams/

Anthony Mark Swinbank (born 27 April 1980) is a British astronomer. He is Professor of Physics at Durham University, where he specializes in the study of galaxy formation and evolution.

== Early life and education ==
Swinbank is from Sedgefield, County Durham. He earned his PhD from Durham University in 2005.

== Career and research ==
Swinbank stayed on at Durham as a research fellow within the Institute for Computational Cosmology following the completion of his PhD. From 2008 to 2011 he undertook a Norman Lockyer Research Fellowship. He was the lead author of a 2009 study that found the universe's infant galaxies 'enjoyed rapid growth spurts' and formed stars at a rate of up to 50 stars per year, which was higher than previously assumed.

In 2013, Swinbank received the Fowler Award from the Royal Astronomical Society. That year he was also awarded the Philip Leverhulme Prize for work on galaxy formation and evolution, gravitational lensing, and star formation. In 2019, Swinbank led a team at the European Southern Observatory in Chile that discovered a faraway galaxy 'forming stars at a rate of 250 Suns per year' via the Atacama Pathfinder Experiment (APEX) telescope.

== Selected publications ==
- Swinbank, A. M.; Smail, I.; Chapman, S. C.; et al. (2004). "The Rest-frame Optical Spectra of SCUBA Galaxies". The Astrophysical Journal. 617 (1): 64–80. arXiv:astro-ph/0412050. Bibcode:2004ApJ...617...64S. doi:10.1086/425171.
- Swinbank, A. M.; Smail, I.; Longmore, S.; et al. (2010). "Intense star formation within resolved compact regions in a galaxy at z = 2.3". Nature. 464 (7289): 733–736. arXiv:1003.3674. Bibcode:2010Natur.464..733S. doi:10.1038/nature08880. PMID 20305639.
- Karim, A.; Swinbank, A. M.; Hodge, J. A.; et al. (2013). "An ALMA survey of submillimetre galaxies in the Extended Chandra Deep Field South: High resolution 870 μm source counts". Monthly Notices of the Royal Astronomical Society. 432 (1): 2–19. arXiv:1210.0249. doi:10.1093/mnras/stt196.
- Swinbank, A. M.; Simpson, J. M.; Smail, I.; et al. (2015). "ALMA resolves the properties of star-forming regions in a dense gas disk at z ~ 3". The Astrophysical Journal Letters. 806 (1): L17. arXiv:1505.05148. Bibcode:2015ApJ...806L..17S. doi:10.1088/2041-8205/806/1/L17.
