= Laura Valentini =

Italian philosopher

- Awards: Philip Leverhulme Prize

Education
- Education: University College London (MA, PhD), University of Pavia (Laurea)

Philosophical work
- Era: 21st-century philosophy
- Region: Western philosophy
- Institutions: LMU Munich
- Main interests: political, legal, and moral philosophy
- Website: https://www.lauravalentini.net

Laura Valentini is an Italian philosopher and Professor of Philosophy and Political Theory at LMU Munich. She is a winner of Philip Leverhulme Prize and is known for her works on political, legal, and moral philosophy. In the Fall of 2011, she was a Residential Fellow at the Swedish Collegium for Advanced Study in Uppsala, Sweden.

== Books ==
- Justice in a Globalized World: A Normative Framework (Oxford: Oxford University Press, 2011).
- Morality and Socially Constructed Norms (Oxford: Oxford University Press, 2023).
