= Nial Tanvir =

British astronomer

- Born: 1965 (age 60–61)
- Education: Durham University (BSc, PhD)
- Awards: Herschel Medal (2019)
- Scientific career
- Fields: Cosmology
- Workplaces: Leicester University
- Thesis: Resolved stars in external galaxies (1992)
- Doctoral advisor: Dick Fong

Nial Rahil Tanvir (born 1965) is a British astronomer at the University of Leicester. His research specialisms are the Extragalactic distance scale, Galaxy evolution, and Gamma ray bursts. Tanvir has featured in various TV programs including The Sky at Night hosted by Sir Patrick Moore, and Horizon.

Tanvir studied Mathematics and Physics at Durham University (St Aidan's College), graduating in 1986. He was awarded a PhD from the same institution in Cosmology in 1992. He subsequently held a postdoctoral position at Durham before joining the Cambridge University Institute of Astronomy and later the University of Hertfordshire. He was appointed Professor of Astrophysics at the University of Leicester in 2006.

Tanvir headed the international team that discovered the infrared afterglow of GRB 090423 (detected 2009 April 23), the most distant source in the Universe recorded up to that date.

In 2013, he led a team that discovered so-called kilonova emission accompanying GRB 130603B, which provided the first direct evidence that short-duration gamma-ray bursts are created by merging compact sources, either two neutron-stars or a neutron-star and black-hole. He subsequently made the co-discovery of the kilonova AT2017gfo, the counterpart of the first binary neutron star merger that was also detected by its gravitational wave emission, GW170817.

== Honours and awards ==
In 2002, he was a member of the research group which won the European Union Descartes Prize for their pioneering work on gamma-ray bursts. He was awarded the Herschel Medal of the Royal Astronomical Society in 2019. Elected as Fellow of the Royal Society (FRS) in 2025.
