= Mathew Owens =

British physicist

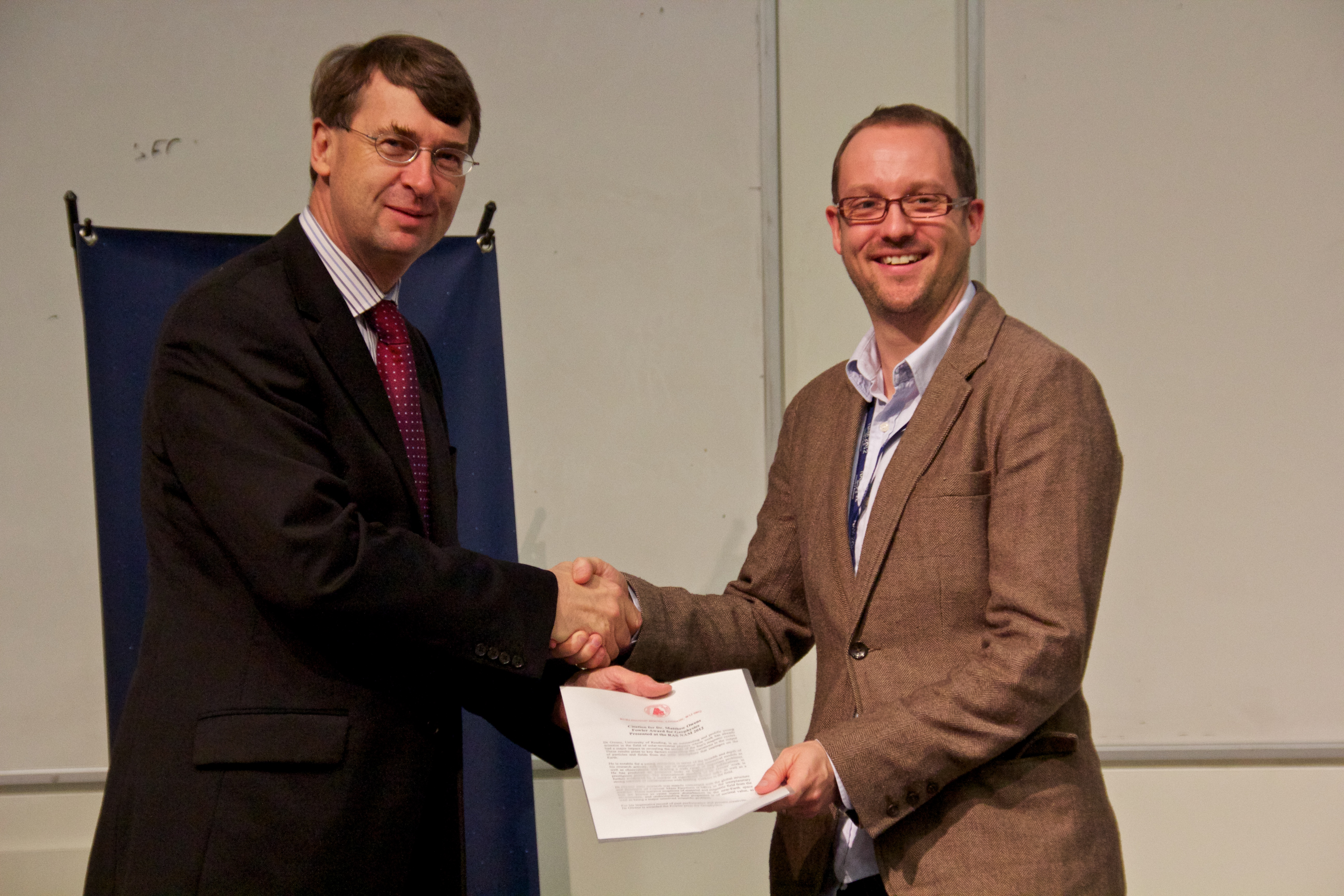
- Matthew Owens (right) receiving the Fowler medal in 2012
- Academic career

Mathew Owens is a British physicist and professor of space physics at the University of Reading in the UK. He has made major contributions to the understanding of the solar wind and space weather.

== Early life and education ==
Owens grew up in Wrexham, Wales, before graduating with an MSci in Physics with Space Science from University College London. He was awarded a doctorate from Imperial College London in 2003 in the field of Space Weather.

== Research career ==
His first postdoctoral position was at the Center for Space Physics, Boston University where he was part of the Consortium in Space-weather Modelling (CISM) and worked with Prof Nancy Crooker from 2004 to 2008. In 2008, he returned to Imperial College London as a senior research associate until joining the Department of Meteorology at the University of Reading in 2010, where he works closely with Prof Mike Lockwood FRS and Prof Christopher Scott.

Owens has published over 200 peer-reviewed articles on a variety of topics including the heliospheric magnetic field, the source of the slow solar wind, empirical and physics-based space-weather and reconstructions of long-term solar variability. He also works on the link between long-term solar variability and terrestrial climate, demonstrating that the Sun is not the primary driver of global temperature variations over the last few centuries.

He developed and maintains the Heliospheric Upwind Extrapolation with time-dependence (HUXt) model of the solar wind, which enables rapid forecasting of space-weather conditions.

His research has often been cited in the national and international press, including the BBC, The Times, The Guardian, The Independent, New Scientist, Scientific American, Forbes, and IFLScience. Owens' work is also regularly highlighted in the main news journal of the American Geophysical Union (AGU), EOS.

Owens is a Co-Investigator for the Solar Orbiter magnetometer instrument. He leads an International Space Science Institute team focused on recalibrating the sunspot record.

== Awards and recognition ==
- 2026: Royal Astronomical Society's Chapman Medal
- 2016: Editor for the journal Solar Physics
- 2013: The highly prestigious Philip Leverhulme prize for outstanding achievement in Astronomy and Astrophysics
- 2012: Royal Astronomical Society's Fowler Award
- 2012: Associate Editor for Journal for Geophysical Research (Space).
