= Nichola Raihani =

British psychologist

Nichola Jayne Raihani
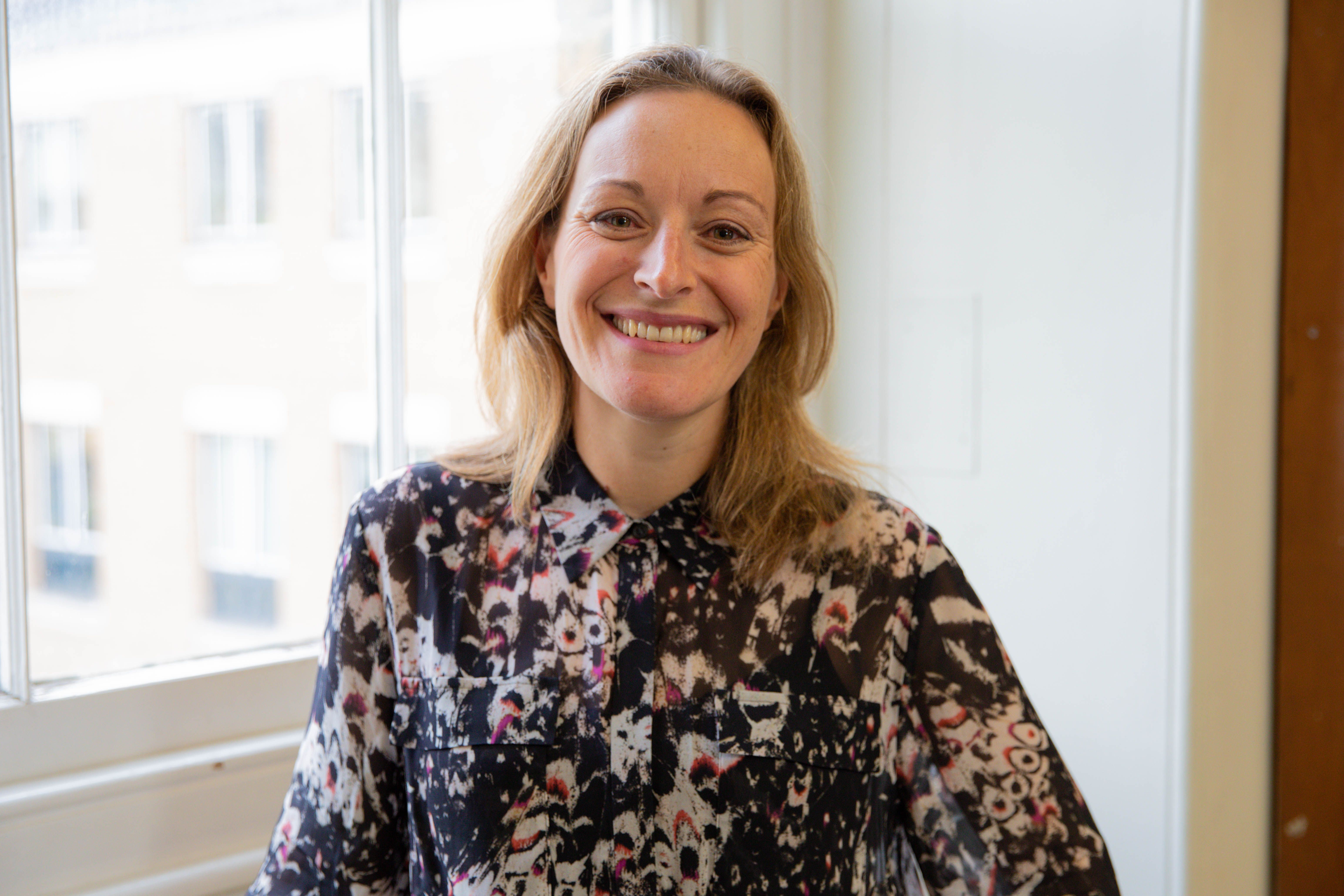
- Born: 6 October 1980 (age 46)
- Education: University College London; University of Cambridge
- Scientific career
- Workplaces: University of Cambridge; Institute of Zoology
- Thesis: Cooperation and conflict in pied babblers (2008)
- Website: www.nicholaraihani.com

Nichola Jayne Raihani is a British psychologist who is a Professor of Evolution and Behaviour at University College London. Her research considers the evolution of cooperation in nature. She was elected Fellow of the Royal Society of Biology in 2019. Her first book, The Social Instinct, was released in 2021.

== Early life and education ==
Raihani is the daughter of Alyson Dye and Athil Raihani. She earned a Bachelor of Arts (Natural Sciences) at Girton College in the University of Cambridge in 2003. She stayed at Cambridge for her graduate studies, where she studied cooperation in pied babblers in the Kalahari Desert. Her doctoral research was supervised by Tim Clutton-Brock. In 2008, she worked as a postdoctoral research fellow at the Institute of Zoology (Zoological Society of London). In 2011, she moved to University College London, where she studied the evolution of punishment and cooperation.

== Research and career ==
In October 2011, Raihani was awarded a Royal Society University Research Fellowship, and moved to University College London. She was made Professor of Evolution and Behaviour in 2017.

Raihani uses an evolutionary approach to investigate social behaviour in humans and other species. She worked alongside Katherine McAuliffe at Harvard University to better understand people's motivations to punish cheaters. Together they identified that people are generally motivated to punish cheaters due to a sense of injustice, not because they are seeking equivalent retaliation. She has collaborated with Redouan Bshary at Lizard Island Research Station to understand the mechanisms supporting cooperation between cleaner fish (Labroides dimidiatus) and their reef-fish clients. Her work also investigates the evolution of punishment, and how punishment and concern for reputation support cooperation in humans. Raihani has also worked with Vaughan Bell, to study the evolutionary basis of paranoid thinking.

She examined the motivations that make people donate to charity, uncovering that men were more likely to donate if they could see that other men had already donated or if the person asking them for donations was an attractive woman. Meanwhile, women's likelihood to donate was not impacted by the appearances of the fundraisers. In another study, Raihani demonstrated that people's willingness to help strangers was related to socioeconomic status, and not urbancity or population density as previously thought.

Raihani was awarded a Philip Leverhulme Prize for Psychology in 2018. With the support from the Royal Society and the Leverhulme Trust, Raihani has studied interpersonal trust and paranoia. Her first book, The Social Instinct: How Cooperation Shaped the World, was published by Jonathan Cape in 2021. She was awarded the Voltaire Lecture medal in 2021, and appointed a patron of Humanists UK, recognising her "contribution to the better understanding of the human condition."

== Selected publications ==
- Thornton, Alex; Nichola J. Raihani (2008). "The evolution of teaching". Animal Behaviour. 75 (6): 1823–1836. doi:10.1016/j.anbehav.2007.12.014. S2CID 41171275. Wikidata Q57930592.
- Nichola J. Raihani; Thornton, Alex; Bshary, Redouan (2012). "Punishment and cooperation in nature". Trends in Ecology & Evolution. 27 (5): 288–295. doi:10.1016/j.tree.2011.12.004. PMID 22284810. S2CID 29650396. Wikidata Q27007016.
- Nichola J. Raihani; Grutter, Alexandra Sara; Bshary, Redouan (2010). "Punishers benefit from third-party punishment in fish". Science. 327 (5962): 171. Bibcode:2010Sci...327..171R. doi:10.1126/science.1183068. PMID 20056883. S2CID 839054. Wikidata Q51593248.

== Personal life ==
Raihani has two sons.
