= Lea Niccolai =

Italian Late-Antique historian

Lea Niccolai

Lea Niccolai is an Italian Late-Antique historian specializing in religious philosophy and socio-political thought. In particular, she examines the various processes of the Christianization of the Roman Empire. She is currently an Assistant Professor of Classics at the University of Cambridge and Director of Studies in Classics at Trinity College.

== Education ==
Niccolai was educated in Rome at the Liceo Classico Anco Marzio. She studied Classics at the Scuola Normale Superiore di Pisa and Ancient Near East Studies with a focus in Syriac at the University of Pisa. She later attained a PhD in Ancient History at King's College, Cambridge.

== Research and career ==
After earning her PhD in 2019, Niccolai held a junior research fellowship at Peterhouse, Cambridge and was a teaching associate in ancient history in Cambridge's Faculty of Classics. She joined Trinity College as a fellow in 2022.

In 2023, she published her first monograph, Christianity, Philosophy, and Roman Power: Constantine, Julian, and the Bishops on Exegesis and Empire, which has been described in the Journal Mythos as a "rich contribution to the history of the late Roman Empire". Catherine Conybeare in the Times Literary Supplement said that Niccolai's book revealed "how deeply indebted Constantine was to the Greco-Roman philosophical tradition, importing its presuppositions into his support for the church".

In 2024, she was awarded a Philip Leverhulme Prize for outstanding achievement in research in classical studies.

=== Media work ===
In March 2024, Niccolai appeared as a panelist in an episode of the BBC Radio 4 programme In Our Time discussing Julian the Apostate alongside James Corke-Webster and Shaun Tougher.

== Selected publications ==
- Christianity, Philosophy, and Roman Power: Constantine, Julian, and the Bishops on Exegesis and Empire. Cambridge University Press, 2023.
- "From Epic to Parable. A Syriac reading of the Fall of Troy", Le Muséon 132.1-2, 2019.
- "Synesius of Cyrene, Sophist-Bishop: Rhetoric and Religion in the Greek East at the Turn of the Fifth Century CE", Rhetorica 39.2, 2021.
- "Malalas the Syrian", in O. Gengler, M. Meier (eds.), Johannes Malalas, der Chronist als Zeithistoriker. Stuttgart, 2022.
- "Julian the Emperor and the reaction against Christianity: a case study of resistance from the top", in J. Elsner, D. Jolowicz (eds.), Articulating Resistance under the Roman Empire. Cambridge, 2023.
