= Kalina Manova =

Professor of economics

Kalina Manova is an American and Bulgarian professor of economics and deputy head of department at University College London. She is the winner of the 2016 Philip Leverhulme Prize. She also part of the council of the European Economic Association. She is on the editorial board of the Review of Economic Studies.

== Career ==
Manova obtained her bachelor, master and PhD in economics at Harvard University. After her PhD, she was visiting assistant professor at the Princeton University in 2009–2010. She then moved to Stanford as an assistant professor from 2007 to 2016. After Stanford, she was named associate professor at the University of Oxford from 2015 to 2017.

She has been a member of the NBER since 2016 and CEPR since 2015. She is an associate at the LSE Centre for Economic Performance.

== Research ==
Her research focus is on international trade and investment. Her research analyses international frictions in financial trade. Her most cited paper in the Review of Economic studies shows how financial market imperfections restricts international trade. The constraints come from the difficulty for exporter to access external capital.

She also specialises in firm productivity, looking at management practices among other things. Part of her research also looks at global value chains and firm production networks. She has won a 1.4 million euro ERC grant to look at the fragmentation of production across firms and countries.

She has published research in the Quarterly Journal of Economics, Journal of Political Economy and Review of Economic Studies. Her research has been cited in El Pais. She is the 155 most cited female economist according to RePEc.

She won the Kiel Institute's Excellence Award in Global Economic Affairs prize, the 2016 Philip Leverhulme Prize and a Hoover Institution National Fellowship.
