= Clare Parnell =

British astrophysicist and applied mathematician

Clare Elizabeth Parnell (born 1970) is a British astrophysicist and applied mathematician who studies the mathematics of the Sun and of magnetic fields, including the Solar corona and the Sun's magnetic carpet, magnetic reconnection in plasma, and the null points of magnetic fields. She is a professor of mathematics at the University of St Andrews, and the former head of the Division of Applied Mathematics at St Andrews.

== Education and career ==
Parnell was born in Essex and educated at The Ridgeway School and Swindon Technical College. As a child, she found mathematics to be her easiest subject. She entered the University of Wales College Cardiff in 1988, originally intending to study both chemistry and mathematics, but after a year switched to mathematics only. In 1991 she completed a bachelor's degree with first class honours in mathematics at Cardiff. She then came to the University of St Andrews as a doctoral student, finishing her Ph.D. in theoretical solar physics in 1994.

She remained at St Andrews as a postdoctoral researcher (interrupted by research at Stanford University in 1996–1997), became a lecturer in 2002, and was promoted to professor in 2011. From 2009 to 2013 she was head of the Division of Applied Mathematics at St Andrews.

== Recognition ==
In 2006, Parnell won the Fowler Prize for Early Achievement in Astronomy and Geophysics of the Royal Astronomical Society for her research on how the Solar corona is heated. In 2007 she won a Philip Leverhulme Prize for her work on solar physics.

== Personal ==
Parnell is an avid mountaineer and chose the University of Wales in part for its nearby mountains. In her three years as a doctoral student at St Andrews, she climbed all 277 peaks then listed as Munros. She has two children.
