= Manuel Barcia =

Cuban historian

Manuel Barcia in 2024

Manuel Barcia (born 1972, Havana) is Pro-Vice-Chancellor (Global Engagement) at the University of Bath, in the United Kingdom.

Barcia is a scholar on the field of Atlantic and Slavery Studies. He has published extensively on the subjects of slave resistance, slave rebellion and on the transfers of West African warfare knowledge to the Americas, with an emphasis on nineteenth-century Brazil, and Cuba. He has written op-ed articles for Al Jazeera English, The Independent, The Washington Spectator, The Washington Post. and The Huffington Post. Between 2013 and 2022 he was also an editor of Atlantic Studies: Global Currents (Routledge), a journal of Atlantic history and cultural studies. Barcia is one of a group of scholars who have been engaged in ongoing debates about the legacies of empires worldwide. More recently he has also participated in numerous discussions about universities, their past links to slavery, and the need for reparations. In 2014 he was awarded a Philip Leverhulme Prize in History, given every year to researchers whose work "has already attracted international recognition and whose future career is exceptionally promising". More recently he was a juror for the 2019 Frederick Douglass Book Prize. In 2021 his book The Yellow Demon of Fever: Fighting Disease in the Nineteenth-Century Transatlantic Slave Trade, won the Paul E. Lovejoy Prize awarded annually by the Journal of Global Slavery to the foremost major scholarly work in the field of global slavery. In 2026, Professor Barcia was elected a Fellow of the British Academy.

== Selected works ==
- Pirate Imperialism: Trade, Abolition, and Global Suppression of Maritime Raiding, 1825-1870 (New Haven: Yale University Press, 2026). ISBN 9780300269451
- The Yellow Demon of Fever: Fighting Disease in the Nineteenth-Century Transatlantic Slave Trade (New Haven: Yale University Press, 2020). ISBN 9780300215854
- Wage-Earning Slaves: Coartación in Nineteenth-Century Cuba [Co-authored with Claudia Varella] (Gainesville: University of Florida Press, 2020). ISBN 9781683401650
- West African Warfare in Bahia and Cuba: Soldier Slaves in the Atlantic World, 1807-1844 (Oxford and New York: Oxford University Press, 2014). ISBN 9780198719038
- The Great African Slave Revolt of 1825: Cuba and the Fight for Freedom in Matanzas (Baton Rouge: Louisiana State University Press, 2012). ISBN 9780807143322
- Seeds of Insurrection: Domination and Slave Resistance on Cuban Plantations (Baton Rouge: Louisiana State University Press, 2008). ISBN 9780807133651
