= Rob Fender =

British astrophysicist

- Born: 19 February 1969 (age 57)
- Education: University of Southampton (BSc); Open University (PhD)
- Awards: Philip Leverhulme Prize (2005); Herschel Medal (2020)
- Scientific career
- Workplaces: University of Oxford, University of Southampton, University of Amsterdam, University of Sussex
- Thesis: Multiwavelength behaviour of Cygnus X-3 and related objects (1996)
- Doctoral advisor: Jocelyn Bell Burnell

Robert P. Fender is a British astrophysicist. He is Professor of Astrophysics at the University of Oxford.

Fender earned his undergraduate degree from the University of Southampton. His doctorate was awarded by the Open University in 1996. He was Head of Astrophysics at Oxford from 2019 to 2024.

Fender was a Philip Leverhulme Prize winner in 2005, and was the 2020 recipient of the Herschel Medal.
