= Lowther Castle Stead =

Medieval site in Cumbria

Coordinates: 54.6099°N 2.7464°W

- Castlesteads
- Location within Cumbria
- Type: Ringwork castle
- Location: Cumbria
- OS grid reference: NY51892412

Site notes
- Excavation dates: 2023–24

Lowther Castle Stead is a medieval site in Cumbria, possibly a ringwork castle. It lies just east of the River Lowther. The castle was probably established in the 11th or 12th century as part of the Norman conquest of the region, and it was out of use by the mid-14th century. A medieval village and church were also established nearby.

The medieval castle was first investigated archaeologically in 1997 when the Lancaster University Archaeology Unit carried out an earthwork survey. In 2023, Lancaster University, the University of Central Lancashire, and Allen Archaeology carried out excavations on the site.

== Location ==
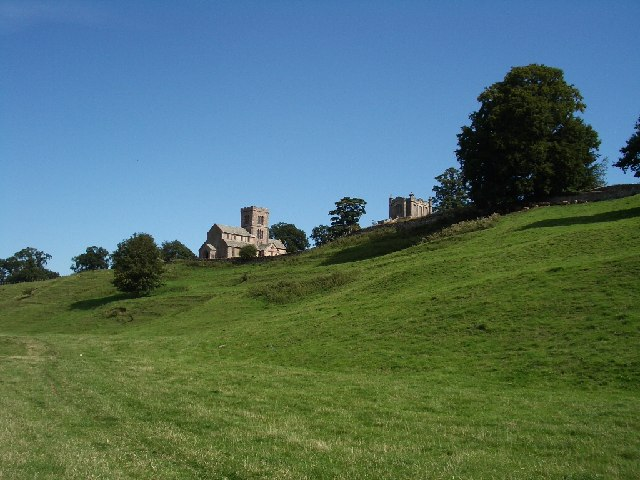
The parish church was established in the 12th century.

The medieval fortification of Lower Castle sits in what is now an area of woodland; west of the castle the land slopes down to the River Lowther, which flows south to north. In the Middle Ages, before the woodland was established, the castle's visibility would have made it a significant landmark in the area.

The castle is 330 metres (360 yd) south of the Church of St Michael which, which dates to at least the late 12th century. The medieval village of Lowther lay between the church and the ringwork castle. In the medieval period, there was also a deer park for hunting, a popular pastime of medieval lords.

== History ==
It is uncertain when the medieval castle was established, but it likely dates to the 11th or 12th century. If it was established in the 11th century, it may have formed part of the Norman conquest of the region. A 'castellum de Lauudre' was documented in 1174, which may refer to Lowther Castle Stead.

Lowther village was arranged along two roads, one running east west and the other north south, and with the castle at the south end and the church at the north. It is likely to be a planned settlement with regularly spaced house plots. The Norman Conquest of the region led to the establishment of many planned settlements such as Melkinthorpe.

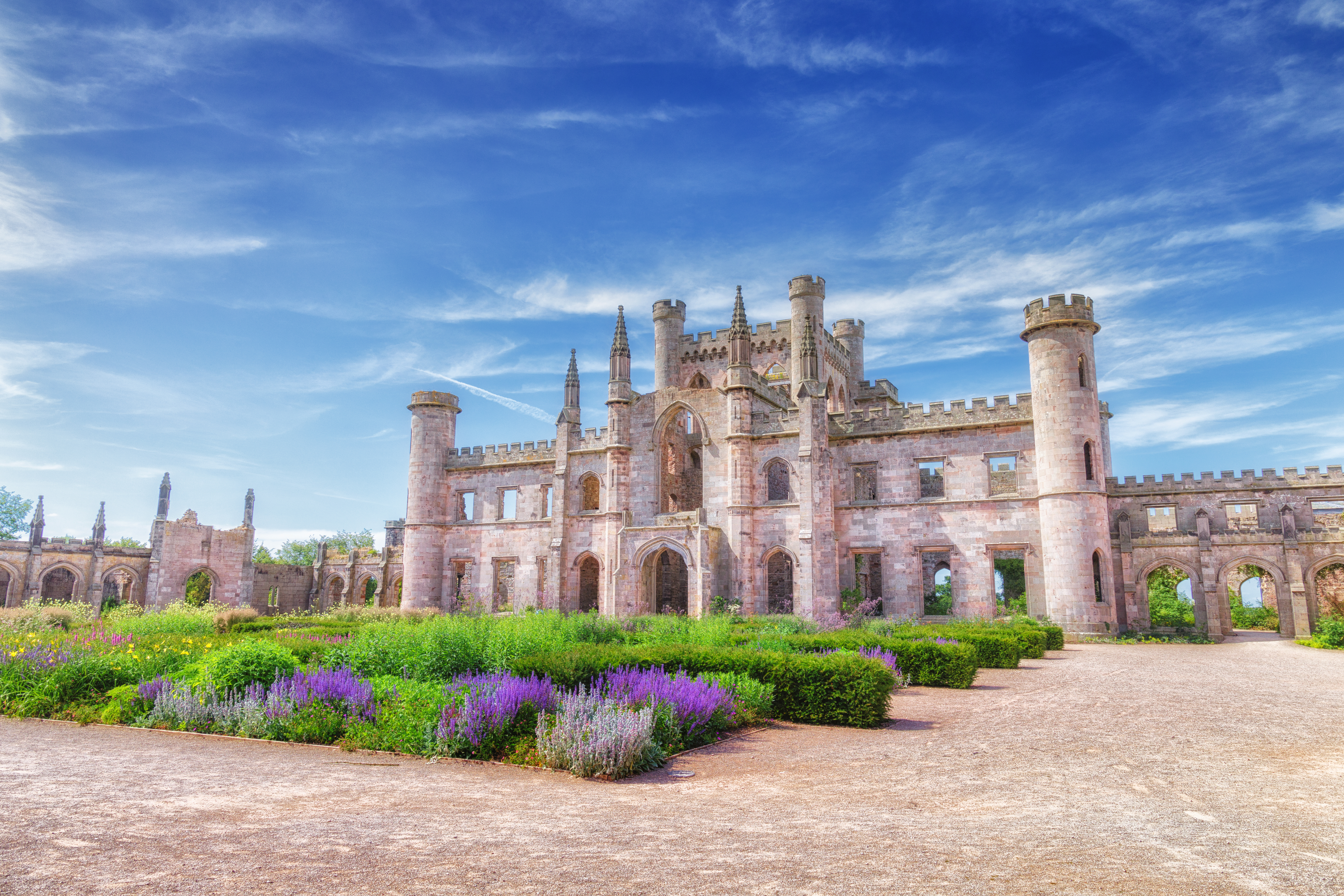
The present building called Lowther Castle was built in the early 19th century by Robert Smirke.

The medieval castle was probably abandoned in the mid-14th century, though the village continued to be inhabited. Around this time, a pele tower was established about 400 metres (1,300 ft) south-east of the ringwork castle. This developed into a country house, and from the 19th century took on the name of Lowther Castle; it was abandoned after World war II. John Lowther, 1st Viscount Lonsdale, when still Sir John Lowther Bt., demolished the medieval village in 1682.

== Investigation ==
In 1997, Lancaster University Archaeology Unit carried out a survey of the earthworks of the castle and associated medieval village to the east and north.

In 2023, Sophie Thérèse Ambler secured funding from the Castle Studies Trust to carry out the first geophysical surveys and excavation at the site of the castle and medieval village. Involving Lancaster University, the University of Central Lancashire, and Allen Archaeology the aim was to investigate the early history of the site. The geophysical survey focused on the medieval village. The project featured on Digging for Britain, a television series about archaeology in the UK.

== Layout ==
Lowther Castle consists of a roughly square enclosure bounded by a bank. The interior of the castle was artificially raised above ground level. It is likely that the bank was originally higher, and the top levels have eroded over time. It is also probable that the bank would have bee topped by a timber palisade. The castle was entered through a gap in the eastern bank.
