= Hannah Wakeford =

British astrophysicist

Wakeford at AAAS 2025

Hannah Ruth Wakeford is a British astrophysicist whose research concerns extraterrestrial atmospheres. She is an associate professor of astrophysics at the University of Bristol.

== Education and career ==
Wakeford studied physics, with planetary and space physics, in a four-year master's program from 2007 to 2011 at Aberystwyth University, including courses in 2011 at the University Centre in Svalbard. She completed a Ph.D. in physics at the University of Exeter. Her doctoral dissertation, Cloudy with a chance of water: Investigating hot Jupiter exoplanet atmospheres through observation and analysis, was supervised by David Sing.

From 2015 to 2017 she worked as a NASA Postdoctoral Fellow at the Goddard Space Flight Center near Washington, D.C. After briefly returning to the UK as a Senior Research Fellow at the University of Exeter, she worked from 2017 to 2020 as a Giacconi Fellow at the Space Telescope Science Institute in Baltimore. She joined the academic staff of the University of Bristol as a lecturer in 2020, where she became senior lecturer in early 2023 and then associate professor later in 2023.

== Research ==
Wakeford's research has included observations that suggest that hot Jupiter exoplanets are not dry, but, rather, hide their water behind clouds. She has identified exoplanet HAT-P-26b as having an unusually "primitive" hydrogen–helium atmosphere without clouds, and discovered quartz clouds on exoplanet WASP-17b. Beyond the chemical and material compositions of exoplanet atmospheres, she has also developed methods for mapping their shapes, and used them to show that the atmosphere of WASP-17b has significant prominences on its evening side relative to its morning side.

== Recognition ==
Wakeford was a 2024 recipient of the Philip Leverhulme Prizes. She was the 2025 winner of the Fowler Award for early achievement in astronomy of the Royal Astronomical Society.
