= Joseph Webster (anthropologist) =

British anthropologist

- Awards: Philip Leverhulme Prize

Academic background
- Education: University of Edinburgh (MA, MRes, PhD)

Academic work
- Discipline: anthropologist
- Sub-discipline: anthropology of religion

Joseph Webster is a British anthropologist and professor of the anthropology of religion at the Cambridge Faculty of Divinity. He is a winner of Philip Leverhulme Prize and is known for his works on the anthropology of religion.

== Books ==
- The Religion of Orange Politics: Protestantism and Fraternity in Contemporary Scotland, Manchester: MUP, 2022
- The Anthropology of Protestantism: Faith and Crisis among Scottish Fishermen, New York: Palgrave, 2015
