= Thiemo Fetzer =

German British economist

- Awards: Philip Leverhulme Prize; ERC Starting Grant
- Scientific career
- Fields: Applied Economics; Political Economy; Economic Development; Data Science
- Workplaces: University of Warwick; University of Bonn
- Website: http://www.trfetzer.com

Thiemo Fetzer is a German economist and professor at the University of Warwick and the University of Bonn. His research focuses on applied economics, political economy, and economic development, with a particular emphasis on the use of artificial intelligence, data science, and machine learning methodologies. Fetzer's work has contributed to major policy discussions and has received coverage in both national and international media outlets.

== Career ==
Fetzer was raised in Ulm, Germany, where he completed his Abitur at the Schubart Gymnasium. He earned a Bachelor of Science degree in Management and Economics from Otto von Guericke University Magdeburg, supported by a scholarship from the Konrad Adenauer Foundation. He subsequently completed a Master of Science and a Doctor of Philosophy in Economics at the London School of Economics (LSE), funded by the German Academic Exchange Service (DAAD), the Konrad Adenauer Foundation’s Promotionskolleg Soziale Marktwirtschaft, and the Tibor Scitovsky Fellowship.

Following the completion of his doctorate, Fetzer held academic positions at the University of Warwick, the University of Chicago, and served as a visiting fellow at the London School of Economics. He was appointed Professor of Economics at the University of Warwick in 2021 and at the University of Bonn in 2023.

Fetzer has worked with policymakers and international organizations, including the International Monetary Fund, the World Bank, and the Brookings Institution. His research has addressed a range of global economic and political issues, such as Brexit, austerity policies, deforestation in Brazil, and the tariffs implemented during the Trump administration.

== Research and Impact ==
Fetzer's research spans a range of topics in economics, including political economy, public policy, and environmental economics. His work examining the political and economic factors of Brexit, particularly the role of austerity, has been referenced in studies on the Causes of the vote in favour of Brexit. The work has also inspired artists to discuss the wider societal impact of austerity and contributed to shaping public discourse in the UK and beyond.

During the COVID-19 pandemic, Fetzer investigated aspects of public policy implementation and digital infrastructure. His research included analysis on contact tracing errors and the UK government's Eat Out to Help Out scheme.

He has also conducted research on the Mahatma Gandhi National Rural Employment Guarantee Act (MGNREGA) in India, focusing on its role in enhancing climate resilience. His findings suggest that employment guarantee programs may mitigate the effects of adverse weather shocks and reduce the risk of conflict.

Fetzer's work on the economic and environmental implications of shale gas production and the global energy transition has also been part of his broader research agenda.

His research has been published in leading journals such as American Economic Review, The Economic Journal, and Science. He is among the most highly cited economists.

== Awards and Recognitions ==
- European Research Council Starting Grant (2022)
- Philip Leverhulme Prize (2022) awarded every three years for outstanding contributions to applied economics and political economy.
- COVID-19 Special Award (2022)
- Office of National Statistics Research Excellence Awards (2024) for Impact of Analysis Collaboration with Government.

== Press and Media ==
Fetzer's work has been widely featured in the popular press such as in The New York Times, Financial Times, The Guardian, The Economist, and Le Monde. His research on austerity and Brexit has influenced debates surrounding the 2016 United Kingdom European Union membership referendum and policy discussions around Europe concerning the merits of Germany's fiscal rules that constrain public investment.

His work during the COVID-19 pandemic has been influential and widely cited for its creative use of administrative data to shine light on public health system failures.
