= Mohammad Saleh Zarepour =

Iranian philosopher

- محمدصالح زارع‌پور
- Awards: Philip Leverhulme Prize (2023)

Academic background
- Education: Cambridge University (PhD), Tarbiat Modarres University (PhD), Sharif University of Technology (BS)

Academic work
- Discipline: Philosophy
- Institutions: University of Manchester (2022–), University of Birmingham (2020–2022), Munich School of Ancient Philosophy at LMU Munich (2019-2020)
- Main interests: medieval Islamic philosophy, philosophy of religion, philosophy of language, philosophy of mathematics, philosophy of logic
- Website: https://www.ms-zarepour.com/

Mohammad Saleh Zarepour is an Iranian philosopher and senior lecturer at the Department of Philosophy of the University of Manchester. He is a winner of Philip Leverhulme Prize (2023) and a Life Member of Clare Hall College. Zarepour is known for his works on medieval Islamic philosophy, philosophy of religion, philosophy of language, philosophy of mathematics, and philosophy of logic.

== Books ==
- Medieval Finitism, Cambridge: Cambridge University Press, 2025
- Necessary Existence and Monotheism: An Avicennian Account of the Islamic Conception of Divine Unity, Cambridge: Cambridge University Press, 2022

=== edited ===
- Logic, Soul, and World: Essays in Arabic Philosophy in Honor of Tony Street, edited with Asad Q. Ahmed and Riccardo Strobino, Leiden: Brill, 2025
- Global Dialogues in the Philosophy of Religion From Religious Experience to the Afterlife, edited with Yujin Nagasawa, New York: Oxford University Press, 2024
- Islamic Philosophy of Religion, New York: Routledge, 2024
- Mathematics, Logic, and their Philosophies, edited with Mojtaba Mojtahedi and Shahid Rahman, Dordrecht: Springer, 2021
