= Myles Lavan =

Classicist

Myles Lavan is an ancient historian and professor at the University of St. Andrews who researches the social and cultural history of Ancient Rome. He received a 2018 Philip Leverhulme Prize in Classics and is currently the editor of The Journal of Roman Studies.

== Career ==
Lavan received his BA in Classics from Trinity College Dublin in 1999. He began studying international politics and economics at Georgetown University. He briefly worked for McKinsey & Company as a management consultant until 2004, when he spent four years at University of Cambridge to earn an MPhil and Ph.D. In 2010, he joined University of St. Andrews, where he is currently a professor.

In 2018, he won the Philip Leverhulme Prize in Classics. As of 2025, he is the editor of The Journal of Roman Studies, published by Cambridge University Press.

== Selected publications ==
- Lavan, Myles (2013). Slaves to Rome: Paradigms of Empire in Roman Culture. Cambridge (GB): Cambridge University Press. ISBN 9781107026018.
- Lavan, Myles (November 2019). "The Army and the Spread of Roman Citizenship". The Journal of Roman Studies. 109: 27–69. doi:10.1017/S0075435819000662. hdl:10023/18193.
