= Philip Leverhulme Prize =

British science and technology award

Philip Leverhulme Prizes
- Awarded for: "Achievement of outstanding researchers whose work has already attracted international recognition and whose future career is exceptionally promising"
- Sponsored by: Leverhulme Trust
- Country: United Kingdom
- Reward: £100,000
- Website: www.leverhulme.ac.uk/funding/grant-schemes/philip-leverhulme-prizes

The Philip Leverhulme Prize is awarded by the Leverhulme Trust to recognise the achievement of outstanding researchers whose work has already attracted international recognition and whose future career is exceptionally promising. The prize scheme makes up to thirty awards of £100,000 a year, across a range of academic disciplines.

== History and criteria ==
The award is named after Philip Leverhulme who died in 2000. He was the grandson of William Leverhulme, and was the third Viscount Leverhulme. The prizes are payable, in instalments, over a period of two to three years. Prizes can be used for any purpose which can advance the prize-holder's research, with the exception of enhancing the prize-holder's salary.

Nominees must hold either a permanent post or a long-term fellowship in a UK institution of higher education or research that would extend beyond the duration of the Philip Leverhulme Prize. Those otherwise without salary are not eligible to be nominated. Nominees should normally have been awarded their doctoral degree not more than ten years prior to the closing date.

== Awards ==
Leverhulme awards are granted annually.

=== 2026 ===
In 2026, the prizes were awarded in the following fields:

- Biological sciences: Florencia Camus, Guillaume Chomicki, Adriane Esquivel Muelbert, Anjali Hinch, Bipin Pandey
- History: Bethan Fisk; Laura C Forster; Mahmood Kooria; Stephanie Mawson; Jake Subryan Richards
- Law: Franziska Arnold-Dwyer; Richard Martin; Bobby Reddy; Sarah White; Roxana Willis
- Mathematics and statistics: Giuseppe Cannizzaro; Soheyla Feyzbakhsh; Kaibo Hu; Laura Monk; Tengyao Wang
- Philosophy and theology: Neil Dewar; Katharine Jenkins; Josh Milburn; Suzanna Millar; James Read
- Sociology and social policy: Rob Gruijters; Alexandra Hall; Ali Meghji; Maddy Power; Thomas Stubbs

=== 2025 ===
In 2025 the prizes were awarded in the following fields:

- Archaeology: Georgia Andreou, Beatriz Marín-Aguilera, Elisabeth Niklasson, Philip Riris, John Rowan
- Chemistry: Rebecca Beveridge, Emily Draper, Alexander Forse, Meera Mehta, Mattia Silvi
- Economics: Clare Balboni, Felipe González, Attila Lindner, Ludvig Sinander, Constantine Yannelis
- Engineering: Soroush Abolfathi, Letizia Gionfrida, Jun Jiang, Emilio Martínez-Pañeda, Noa Zilberman
- Geography: Sydney Calkin, Thomas Cowan, Joshua Dean, Matthew Jones, Kasia Paprocki
- Languages and Literatures: Ian Cushing, Callan Davies, Noreen Masud, Mathelinda Nabugodi, Ed Pulford

=== 2024 ===
In 2024 the prizes were awarded in the following fields:

- Classics: Lilah Grace Canevaro, Katherine McDonald, Lea Niccolai, Henry Spelman, George Woudhuysen
- Earth Sciences: Michael Byrne, Sam Giles, Louise Slater, Andrew Thomson, Iestyn Woolway
- Physics: Natalia Ares, Paulo Ceppi, Davide Michieletto, Bartomeu Monserrat, Hannah Wakeford
- Politics and International Relations: Federica Genovese, Maxime Lepoutre, Nivi Manchanda, José Ciro Martínez, Pavithra Suryanarayan
- Psychology: Miriam Klein-Flugge, Sheina Lew-Levy, Catherine Manning, Aja Murray, Michael Muthukrishna
- Visual and Performing Arts: Ross Cole, Sasha Litvintseva, El Morgan, Mario Slugan, Amy Twigger Holroyd

=== 2023 ===
In 2023 the prizes were awarded in the following fields:

- Biological Sciences: Anders Bergström, Katharine Coyte, Sandy Hetherington, Tommaso Jucker, Alison Wright
- History: Emily Corran, John Gallagher, Bérénice Guyot-Réchard, Ryan Hanley, Peter Hill
- Law: Anna Chadwick, Seán Columb, Lawrence Hill-Cawthorne, Sharon Thompson, Joe Tomlinson
- Mathematics and Statistics: Holly Krieger, Po-Ling Loh, Michael Magee, Chris Oates, Yi Yu
- Philosophy and Theology: Adrian Currie, Jessie Munton, Nil Özlem Palabiyik, Amia Srinivasan, Mohammad Saleh Zarepour
- Sociology and Social Policy: Ella Cockbain, Rebecca Elliott, Maziyar Ghiabi, Remi Joseph-Salisbury, Ridhi Kashyap

=== 2022 ===
In 2022 the prizes were awarded in the following fields:

- Archaeology: Chiara Bonacchi, Marianne Hem Eriksen, Corisande Fenwick, Patrick Gleeson, Sarah Inskip
- Chemistry: Bryan Bzdek, Nicholas Chilton, Brianna Heazlewood, Rebecca Melen, Ruth Webster
- Economics: Abi Adams-Prassl, Stefano Caria, Thiemo Fetzer, Sandra Sequeira, Daniel Wilhelm
- Engineering: Sebastian Bonilla, John Orr, Daniel Slocombe, Harrison Steel, Jin Xuan
- Geography: Maan Barua, Sarah Bell, Anita Ganesan, Ed Manley, Isla Myers-Smith
- Languages and Literatures: Joanna Allan, Josie Gill, Joseph Hone, Preti Taneja, Sam Wolfe

=== 2021 ===
In 2021 the prizes were awarded in the following fields:

- Classics: Tom Geue, Theodora Jim, Giuseppe Pezzini, Henry Stead, Kathryn Stevens
- Earth Sciences: Nicholas Brantut, Andrea Burke, Paula Koelemeijer, Erin Saupe, Nem Vaughan
- Physics: Jayne Birkby, Radha Boya, Denis Martynov, Jonathan Matthews, Samuel Stranks
- Politics and International Relations: Teresa Bejan, Christopher Claassen, Graham Denyer Willis, Janina Dill, Inken von Borzyskowski
- Psychology: Jennifer Cook, Jim A.C. Everett, Tobias Hauser, Patricia Lockwood, Netta Weinstein
- Visual and Performing Arts: Jennifer Coates, Mohamad Hafeda, Lonán Ó Briain, Martin O'Brien, Annebella Pollen

=== 2020 ===
In 2020 the prizes were awarded in the following fields:

- Biological Sciences: Tanmay Bharat, Hernán Burbano, Hansong Ma, Daniel Streicker, Edze Westra
- History: Sophie Ambler, Stefan Hanß, Florence Sutcliffe-Braithwaite, Rian Thum, Alexia Yates
- Law: Jeremias Adams-Prassl, Paul Davies, Nadine El-Enany, Emily Grabham, Guido Rossi
- Mathematics and Statistics: Ana Caraiani, Heather Harrington, Richard Montgomery, Nick Sheridan, Sasha Sodin
- Philosophy and Theology: Liam Kofi Bright, Elselijn Kingma, Laura Quick, Emily Thomas, Joseph Webster
- Sociology and Social Policy: Judith Bovensiepen, Emily Dawson, Kayleigh Garthwaite, Nisha Kapoor, Lucy Mayblin

=== 2019 ===
In 2019 the prizes were awarded in the following fields:

- Archaeology: Kate Britton, Enrico Crema, Jessica Hendy, Jane Kershaw, Ben Russell
- Chemistry: Artem Bakulin, Thomas Bennett, Kim Jelfs, Daniele Leonori, Silvia Vignolini
- Economics: Gabriella Conti, James Fenske, Xavier Jaravel, Friederike Mengel, Benjamin Moll
- Engineering: Jessica Boland, Rainer Groh, Hannah Joyce, Camille Petit, Alister Smith
- Geography: Sarah Batterman, Christina Hicks, Robert Hilton, Fiona McConnell, Philippa Williams
- Languages & Literature: Marc Alexander, Emma Bond, Merve Emre, Martin Paul Eve, Joseph Moshenska

=== 2018 ===
In 2018 the prizes were awarded in the following fields:

- Classics: Amin Benaissa, Myles Lavan, Alex Mullen, Amy Russell, Shaul Tor
- Earth Sciences: Juliet Biggs, Stephen L. Brusatte, Heather Graven, Babette Hoogakker, Amanda Maycock
- Physics: Alis Deason, Simone De Liberato, Katherine Dooley, Rahul Raveendran Nair, John Russo
- Politics and International Relations: Ezequiel Gonzalez Ocantos, Chris Hanretty, Sophie Harman, Lauren Wilcox, Lea Ypi
- Psychology: Emily S Cross, Stephen Fleming, Claire Haworth, Harriet Over, Nichola Raihani
- Visual and Performing Arts: Erika Balsom, Daisy Fancourt, Ian Kiaer, Peter McMurray, Tiffany Watt Smith

=== 2017 ===
In 2017 the prizes were awarded in the following fields:

- Biological Sciences: Tom Baden, Katie Field, Nick Graham, Kayla King, Andrea Migliano
- History: Andrew Arsan, Toby Green, David Motadel, Lucie Ryzova, Alice Taylor
- Law: Pinar Akman, Ana Aliverti, Fiona de Londras, Rosie Harding, Jeff King
- Mathematics and Statistics: Anders Hansen, Oscar Randal-Williams, Carola-Bibiane Schönlieb, Dominic Vella, Hendrik Weber
- Philosophy and Theology: Naomi Appleton, Joel Cabrita, John Michael, Ian Phillips, Bryan W Roberts
- Sociology and Social Policy: David Clifford, Des Fitzgerald, Suzanne Hall, Tim Huijts, Alice Mah

=== 2016 ===
In 2016 the prizes were awarded in the following fields.

- Archaeology: Susana Carvalho, Manuel Fernandez-Gotz, Oliver Harris, Camilla Speller, Fraser Sturt
- Chemistry: John Bower, Scott Cockroft, David Glowacki, Susan Perkin, Aron Walsh
- Economics: Vasco Carvalho, Camille Landais, Kalina Manova, Uta Schönberg, Fabian Waldinger
- Engineering: Anna Barnett, Cinzia Casiraghi, David Connolly, Alexandra Silva, Peter Vincent
- Geography: Katherine Brickell, Vanesa Castán Broto, Mark Graham, Harriet Hawkins, David Thornalley
- Languages and Literatures: William Abberley, Alexandra Harris, Daisy Hay, Lily Okalani Kahn, Hannah Rohde

=== 2015 ===
In 2015 the prizes were awarded in the following fields.

- Classics: Mirko Canevaro, Esther Eidinow, Renaud Gagné, Naoíse Mac Sweeney, Laura Swift
- Earth sciences: John Rudge, James Screen, Karin Sigloch, Dominick Spracklen, Nicholas Tosca
- Physics: Jacopo Bertolotti, Daniele Faccio, Jo Dunkley, Philip King, Suchitra Sebastian
- Politics: John Bew, Elena Fiddian-Qasmiyeh, Dominik Hangartner, Laura Valentini, Nick Vaughan-Williams
- Psychology: Caroline Catmur, Bhismadev Chakrabarti, Steve Loughnan, Liz Pellicano, Jonathan Roiser
- Visual arts: Sara Davidmann, Mattias Frey, Hannah Rickards, Martin Suckling, Corin Sworn

=== 2014 ===
In 2014, thirty-one prizes were awarded. The 2014 subjects and prizewinners were:

- Biological Sciences: Michael Brockhurst, Elizabeth Murchison, Ewa Paluch, Thomas Richards, Nikolay Zenkin
- History: Manuel Barcia Paz, Aaron Moore, Renaud Morieux, Hannah Skoda, David Trippett
- Mathematics and Statistics: Alexandros Beskos, Daniel Kral, David Loeffler and Sarah Zerbes, Richard Samworth, Corinna Ulcigrai
- Philosophy and Theology: Jonathan Birch, Tim Button, Ofra Magidor, Anna Mahtani, Holger Zellentin
- Law: Alan Bogg, Prabha Kotiswaran, Sarah Nouwen, Erika Rackley, Michael Waibel
- Sociology and Social Policy: Lucie Cluver, Hazem Kandil, Victoria Redclift, Katherine Smith, Imogen Tyler

=== 2013 ===
The 2013 subjects were:

- Astronomy and Astrophysics: Richard Alexander, Stefan Kraus, Mathew Owens, Mark Swinbank, John (Southworth) Taylor
- Economics: Jane Cooley Fruehwirth
- Engineering: Haider Butt, Bharathram Ganapathisubramani, Eileen Gentleman, Aline Miller, Ferdinando Rodriguez y Baena
- Geography: Ben Anderson, Dabo Guan, Anna Lora-Wainwright, Erin McClymont, Colin McFarlane, David Nally, Lindsay Stringer
- Modern languages and Literature: Kathryn Banks, Andrew Counter, Sally Faulkner, Lara Feigel, David James, James Smith, Hannah Sullivan
- Performing and Visual Arts: Martin John Callanan, Nadia Davids, James Moran, Tim Smith

=== 2012 ===
The 2012 subjects were:

- Classics : Patrick Finglass, Miriam Leonard, Michael Squire, Peter Thonemann, Kostas Vlassopoulos
- Earth, Ocean and Atmospheric Sciences : Matt Friedman, Richard Katz, Kirsty Penkman, Laura Robinson, Paul Williams
- History of Art : Jo Applin, Matthew Potter, Richard Taws, Tamara Trodd, Leon Wainwright
- Law : Kimberley Brownlee, James Chalmers, Ioannis Lianos, Marc Moore, Anthea Roberts
- Mathematics and Statistics : Toby Gee, Jonathan Marchini, Andre Neves, Christoph Ortner, Lasse Rempe-Gillen,
- Medieval, Early Modern and Modern History : Duncan Bell, Alexander Morrison, Sadiah Qureshi, Sujit Sivasundaram, David Todd

=== 2011 ===
The 2011 subjects were:

- Astronomy and Astrophysics: Emma Bunce, Andrew Levan, Richard Massey, David Pontin, David Seery
- Economics: Michael Elsby, Andrea Galeotti, Sophocles Mavroeidis, Helen Simpson, Paul Surico
- Engineering: Maria Ana Cataluna, Simon Cotton, Antonio Gil, Katsuichiro Goda, Karen Johnson
- Geography: Peter Adey, Siwan Davies, Hayley Fowler, Simon Lewis, Simon Reid-Henry
- Modern European Languages & Literatures: Anthony Bale, Lindiwe Dovey, Kirsty Hooper, Ben Hutchinson, Robert Macfarlane
- Performing & Visual Arts: Ed Bennett, Helen Freshwater, Esther Johnson, Phoebe Unwin, Emily Wardill

=== 2010 ===
The 2010 subjects were:

- Earth, Ocean and Atmospheric Sciences, e.g. Tamsin Mather
- History of Art
- Law
- Mathematics and Statistics: Caucher Birkar
- Medieval, Early Modern and Modern History

=== 2009 ===
The 2009 subjects were:

- Astronomy and Astrophysics
- Engineering
- Geography
- Modern European Languages and Literature: Santanu Das
- Performing and Visual Arts

=== 2008 ===
The 2008 subjects were:

- Earth, Ocean and Atmospheric Sciences: Stephen Barker, Alan Haywood, Heiko Pälike, Paul Palmer, Rosalind Rickaby, Christian Turney
- History of Art: Jill Burke, Natasha Eaton, Alexander Marr, Carol Richardson, Caroline Vout
- Medieval, Early Modern, And Modern History: Filippo de Vivo, Caroline Humfress, Simon MacLean, Hannah Smith, Paul Warde, William Whyte
- Mathematics and Statistics: Martin Hairer, Harald Helfgott, Jared Tanner, Andreas Winter, Marianna Csornyei
- Zoology: William Hughes, Kate E Jones, Andrea Manica, Tommaso Pizzari, Jane Reid

=== 2007 ===
The 2007 subjects were:

- Astronomy and Astrophysics – David Alexander, Philip Best, Clare Parnell, and William Percival
- Engineering – Leroy Cronin, Jeremy O'Brien
- Geography – Jemma Wadham, Robert John Mayhew
- Modern European Languages and Literature
- Philosophy and Ethics – Hannes Leitgeb, Alison Stone

=== 2006 ===
The 2006 subjects were:

- Earth, Ocean and Atmospheric Sciences: Lucy Carpenter, Tim Wright
- History of Art
- Medieval, Early Modern and Modern History
- Mathematics and Statistics: Matt Keeling
- Zoology

=== 2005 ===
The 2005 subjects were:

- Astronomy and Astrophysics: Katherine Blundell, Andrew Bunker, Rob Fender, Sheila Rowan, Stephen Smartt, Steven M. Tobias
- Engineering: Clemens Kaminski, Andrea C. Ferrari
- Geography: Klaus Dodds, Sarah Holloway, Kevin Ward, Martin R Jones, Georgina H Endfield, Rachel Pain
- Modern European Languages and Literature
- Philosophy and Ethics: Tim Lewens

=== 2004 ===
The 2004 subjects were:

- Anthropology
- Earth, Ocean and Atmospheric Sciences: Alastair Lewis
- Economics
- Mathematics and Statistics
- Medieval, Early Modern and Modern History

=== 2003 ===
The 2003 subjects were:

- Astronomy and Astrophysics : Louise Harra
- Classics
- Engineering
- Geography
- Philosophy and Ethics

=== 2002 ===
The 2002 subjects were:

- Software Technology for Information and Communications Technology: Bashar Nuseibeh
- Ocean, Earth and Atmospheric Sciences
- Modern History since 1800: Adam Tooze
- Economics
- Biochemistry and Molecular Biology: Ben G. Davis

=== 2001 ===
The 2001 subjects were:

- Astronomy and Astrophysics
- Classics
- Engineering
- Geography
- Philosophy and Ethics
