= Robert Wilson (astronomer) =

British astronomer (1927–2002)

- Born: 16 April 1927; South Shields, England
- Died: 2 September 2002 (aged 75); Chelmsford, England
- Education: Durham University
- Known for: International Ultraviolet Explorer
- Spouse: Fiona Wilson
- Children: One daughter, two sons
- Awards: FIP, FRS, FMSRS, CBE, Herschel Medal, US Presidential Award for Design Excellence, Kt Bach, Honorary Fellow of University College London, Massey Award, Honorary DSc of Queen's University Belfast
- Scientific career
- Fields: Astronomy and physics
- Workplaces: University of Edinburgh, Harwell, Culham, University College London
- Thesis: Spectral photometric investigations of early-type stars (1952)
- Doctoral advisor: W. M. H. Greaves

Sir Robert Wilson CBE FRS (16 April 1927 – 2 September 2002) was a British astronomer and physicist. He studied physics at King's College, Durham and obtained his PhD at the University of Edinburgh, where he worked at the Royal Observatory on stellar spectra. His works laid the groundwork for the development of the Great Space Observatories, such as the Hubble Space Telescope.

In 1959 Wilson joined the Plasma Spectroscopy Group at Harwell Laboratory where he was responsible for measuring the temperature in the Zeta experiment, confirming that it had not been hot enough to have produced thermonuclear fusion. As head of the Plasma Spectroscopy Group at Culham, he led a programme of rocket observations of ultraviolet spectra of the Sun and stars. By placing telescopes on rockets and satellites it was possible to avoid the absorption of the ultraviolet light by the Earth's atmosphere and gain a great deal of information about the hot plasmas especially in the Sun's chromosphere and corona.

Wilson then became involved in the European Space Research Organization's first astronomy satellite, the TD-1A mission, and led the British collaboration with Belgium in the S2/68 experiment which in 1972 conducted the first all sky survey in the ultraviolet.

Wilson was best known for his role as "father" of the International Ultraviolet Explorer (IUE) satellite. This had started life in 1964 as a proposal to ESRO for a Large Astronomical Satellite, which proved too expensive and studies were abandoned in 1967. Wilson, however, convinced the UK authorities to continue the study, and achieved a radical redesign which at the same time had greater capability and was simpler and therefore cheaper. This concept was called the Ultraviolet Astronomical Satellite (UVAS). It was again submitted to ESRO in November 1968 but despite a favourable assessment report was not accepted. Convinced of the soundness of the concept, Wilson offered the design work to NASA and this ultimately led to IUE, an international project between NASA, ESA and the UK.

In 1972 he relinquished his post as Director, Science Research Council's Astrophysics Research Unit, Culham to become Perren Professor of Astronomy at University College London. He was the George Darwin Lecturer of the Royal Astronomical Society in 1985. He was knighted in 1989.

He was President of Commission 44 of the International Astronomical Union (IAU) (for astronomical observations outside the terrestrial atmosphere) from 1967 to 1970, a Vice-President of the IAU from 1979 to 1985 and a member of the bureau of the Committee on Space Research (COSPAR) from 1986 to 1990.
