= Stephen Smartt =

Astrophysicist (born 1968)

Stephen John Smartt CBE FRS (born 9 November 1968) is an astrophysicist from Northern Ireland who specialises in stellar evolution, supernovae and time domain sky surveys. He is credited with the discovery of stars that explode as supernovae, measuring their mass, luminosity and the chemical elements synthesized. Smartt is Wetton Professor of Astrophysics and a Royal Society Research Professor at the University of Oxford. He is a patron of Northern Ireland Humanists.

Born and raised in Belfast, Smartt was educated at Belfast Royal Academy and studied physics and applied mathematics at Queen’s University Belfast. He was awarded a PhD in astrophysics in 1996.

Smartt worked at the Isaac Newton Group of telescopes and held a fellowship at the University of Cambridge. He returned to Belfast in 2004 and established a group working on stellar evolution, supernovae and time domain sky surveys. In 2022, he was appointed the Wetton Professor of Astrophysics at the University of Oxford and Director of the Hintze Centre for Astrophysical Surveys. In 2025, Smartt and his colleagues from Queen's, Belfast, were recognised with the Into Change Award from the Danish Ministry of Higher Education and Science.

== Honours and awards ==
Smartt was appointed Commander of the Order of the British Empire (CBE) in the 2022 Birthday Honours for services to science.

- Member of the Royal Irish Academy
- Fellow of the Royal Society, 2020
- Philip Leverhulme Prize, 2005
