= Lockman =

Lockman is a surname. Notable people with the surname include:

- Jay Lockman, American astronomer
- Vic Lockman (1927–2017), American cartoonist and comic strip writer
- Whitey Lockman (1926–2009), American Major League Basebell player, coach, and manager
- Norman Lockman, managing editor of The News Journal from 1984 to 1991

== See also ==
- Lockman Foundation, interdenominational Christian ministry
- Loughman
