= Astrophysical X-ray source =

Astronomical object emitting X-rays

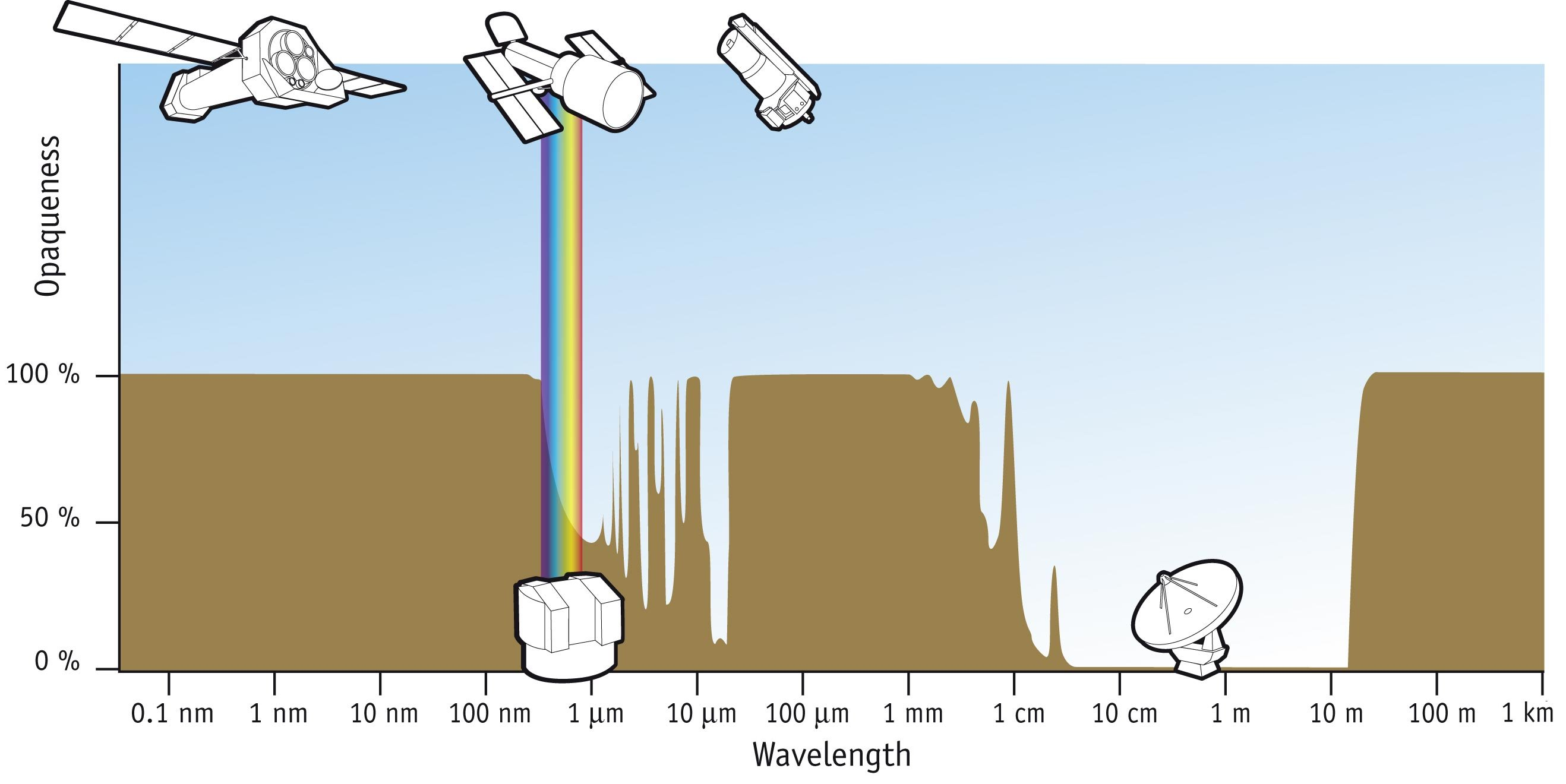
X-rays start at ~0.008 nm and extend across the electromagnetic spectrum to ~8 nm, over which Earth's atmosphere is opaque.

Astrophysical X-ray sources are astronomical objects with physical properties which result in the emission of X-rays.

Several types of astrophysical objects emit X-rays. They include galaxy clusters, black holes in active galactic nuclei (AGN), galactic objects such as supernova remnants, stars, and binary stars containing a white dwarf (cataclysmic variable stars and super soft X-ray sources), neutron star or black hole (X-ray binaries). Some Solar System bodies emit X-rays, the most notable being the Moon, although most of the X-ray brightness of the Moon arises from reflected solar X-rays.

Furthermore, celestial entities in space are discussed as celestial X-ray sources. The origin of all observed astronomical X-ray sources is in, near to, or associated with a coronal cloud or gas at coronal cloud temperatures for however long or brief a period.

A combination of many unresolved X-ray sources is thought to produce the observed X-ray background. The X-ray continuum can arise from bremsstrahlung, either magnetic or ordinary Coulomb, black-body radiation, synchrotron radiation, inverse Compton scattering of lower-energy photons by relativistic electrons, knock-on collisions of fast protons with atomic electrons, and atomic recombination, with or without additional electron transitions.

== Galaxy clusters ==
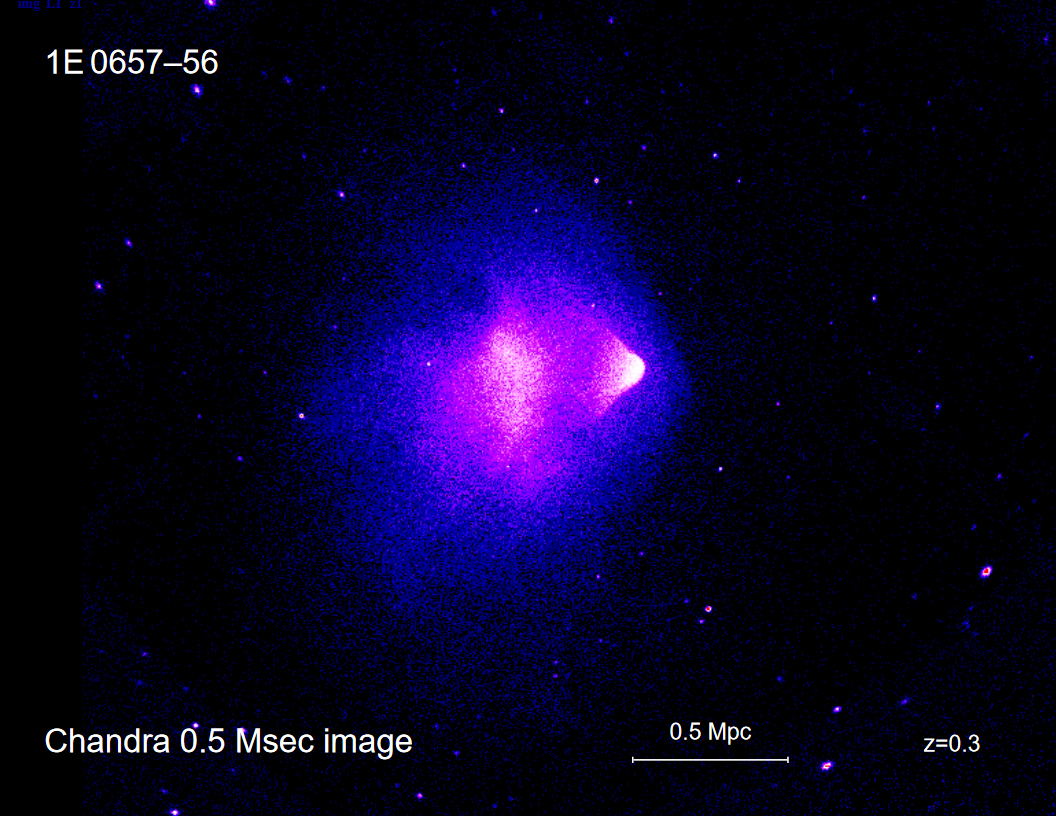
X-ray photo by Chandra X-ray Observatory of the Bullet Cluster. Exposure time was 140 hours. The scale is shown in megaparsecs. Redshift (z) = 0.3, meaning its light has wavelengths stretched by a factor of 1.3.

Clusters of galaxies are formed by the merger of smaller units of matter, such as galaxy groups or individual galaxies. The infalling material (which contains galaxies, gas and dark matter) gains kinetic energy as it falls into the cluster's gravitational potential well. The infalling gas collides with gas already in the cluster and is shock heated to between 10^{7} and 10^{8} K depending on the size of the cluster. This very hot gas emits X-rays by thermal bremsstrahlung emission, and line emission from metals (in astronomy, 'metals' often means all elements except hydrogen and helium). The galaxies and dark matter are collisionless and quickly become virialised, orbiting in the cluster potential well.

At a statistical significance of 8σ, it was found that the spatial offset of the center of the total mass from the center of the baryonic mass peaks cannot be explained with an alteration of the gravitational force law.

== Quasars ==
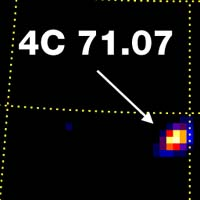
A view of 4C 71.07 from observations by the Burst and Transient Source Experiment. This helped convince scientists that they were studying data from the quasar and not some other source in the neighborhood.

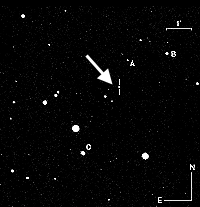
In visible light, 4C 71.07 is less than impressive, just a distant speck of light. It is in radio and in X-rays – and now, gamma rays – that this object really shines. 4C 71.07 is its designation in the Fourth Cambridge Survey of radio sources. Its redshift of z=2.17, puts it about 11 billion years away in a 12 to 15-billion year-old universe (using z=1 as 5 billion light years).

A quasi-stellar radio source (quasar) is a very energetic and distant galaxy with an active galactic nucleus (AGN). QSO 0836+7107 is a Quasi-Stellar Object (QSO) that emits baffling amounts of radio energy. This radio emission is caused by electrons spiraling (thus accelerating) along magnetic fields producing cyclotron or synchrotron radiation. These electrons can also interact with visible light emitted by the disk around the AGN or the black hole at its center. These photons accelerate the electrons, which then emit X- and gamma-radiation via Compton and inverse Compton scattering.

On board the Compton Gamma Ray Observatory (CGRO) is the Burst and Transient Source Experiment (BATSE) which detects in the 20 keV to 8 MeV range. QSO 0836+7107 or 4C 71.07 was detected by BATSE as a source of soft gamma rays and hard X-rays. "What BATSE has discovered is that it can be a soft gamma-ray source", McCollough said. QSO 0836+7107 is the faintest and most distant object to be observed in soft gamma rays. It has already been observed in gamma rays by the Energetic Gamma Ray Experiment Telescope (EGRET) also aboard the Compton Gamma Ray Observatory.

== Seyfert galaxies ==
Seyfert galaxies are a class of galaxies with nuclei that produce spectral line emission from highly ionized gas. They are a subclass of active galactic nuclei (AGN), and are thought to contain supermassive black holes.

== X-ray bright galaxies ==
The following early-type galaxies (NGCs) have been observed to be X-ray bright due to hot gaseous coronae: NGC 315, 1316, 1332, 1395, 2563, 4374, 4382, 4406, 4472, 4594, 4636, 4649, and 5128. The X-ray emission can be explained as thermal bremsstrahlung from hot gas (0.5–1.5 keV).

== Ultraluminous X-ray sources ==
Ultraluminous X-ray sources (ULXs) are pointlike, nonnuclear X-ray sources with luminosities above the Eddington limit of 3 × 10^{32} W for a 20 M_{☉} black hole. Many ULXs show strong variability and may be black hole binaries. To fall into the class of intermediate-mass black holes (IMBHs), their luminosities, thermal disk emissions, variation timescales, and surrounding emission-line nebulae must suggest this. However, when the emission is beamed or exceeds the Eddington limit, the ULX may be a stellar-mass black hole. The nearby spiral galaxy NGC 1313 has two compact ULXs, X-1 and X-2. For X-1 the X-ray luminosity increases to a maximum of 3 × 10^{33} W, exceeding the Eddington limit, and enters a steep power-law state at high luminosities more indicative of a stellar-mass black hole, whereas X-2 has the opposite behavior and appears to be in the hard X-ray state of an IMBH.

== Black holes ==
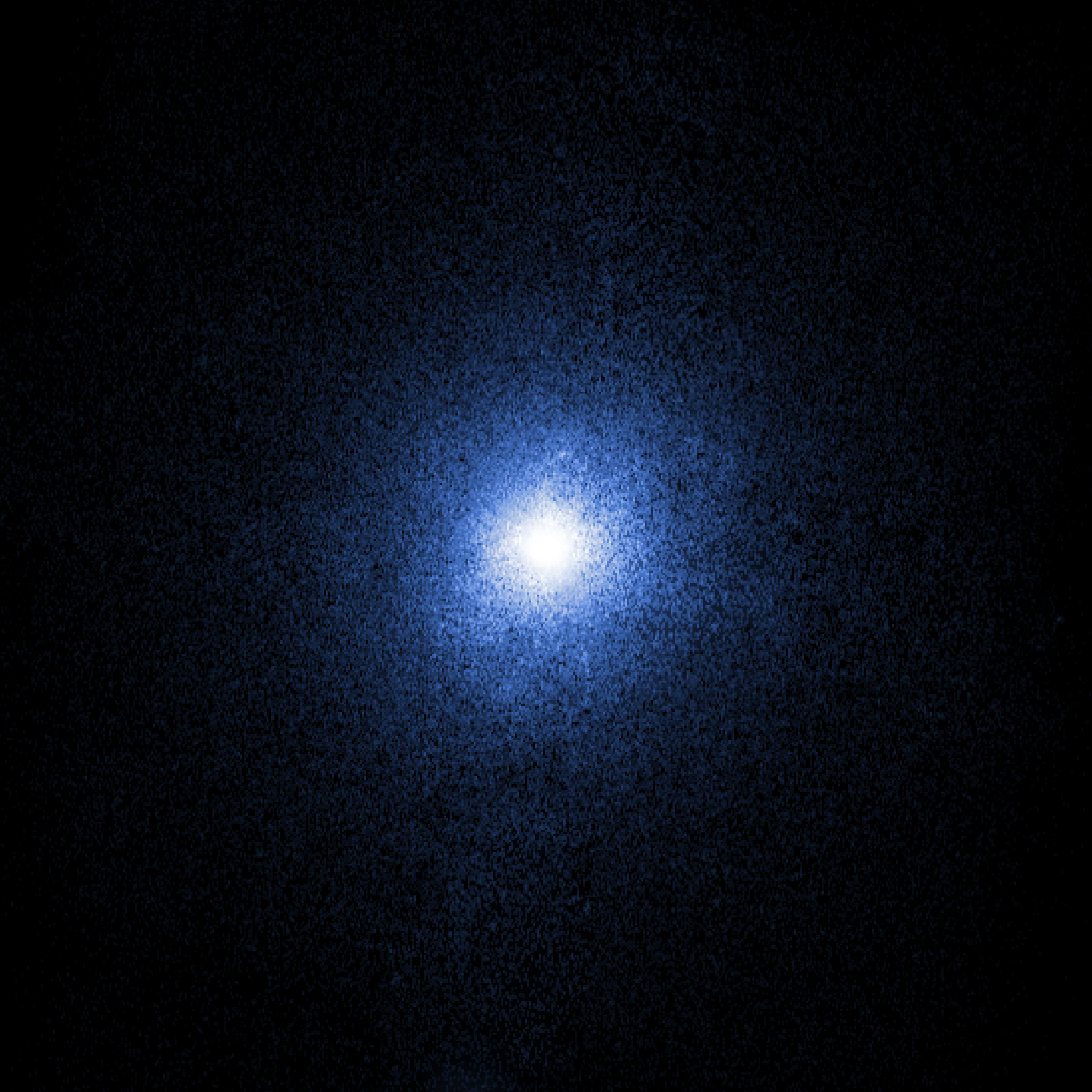
Chandra image of Cygnus X-1, which was the first strong black hole candidate to be discovered.

Black holes give off radiation because matter falling into them loses gravitational energy which may result in the emission of radiation before the matter falls into the event horizon. The infalling matter has angular momentum, which means that the material cannot fall in directly, but spins around the black hole. This material often forms an accretion disk. Similar luminous accretion disks can also form around white dwarfs and neutron stars, but in these the infalling gas releases additional energy as it slams against the high-density surface with high speed. In case of a neutron star, the infall speed can be a sizeable fraction of the speed of light.

In some neutron star or white dwarf systems, the magnetic field of the star is strong enough to prevent the formation of an accretion disc. The material in the disc gets very hot because of friction, and emits X-rays. The material in the disc slowly loses its angular momentum and falls into the compact star. In neutron stars and white dwarfs, additional X-rays are generated when the material hits their surfaces. X-ray emission from black holes is variable, varying in luminosity in very short timescales. The variation in luminosity can provide information about the size of the black hole.

== Supernova remnants (SNR) ==
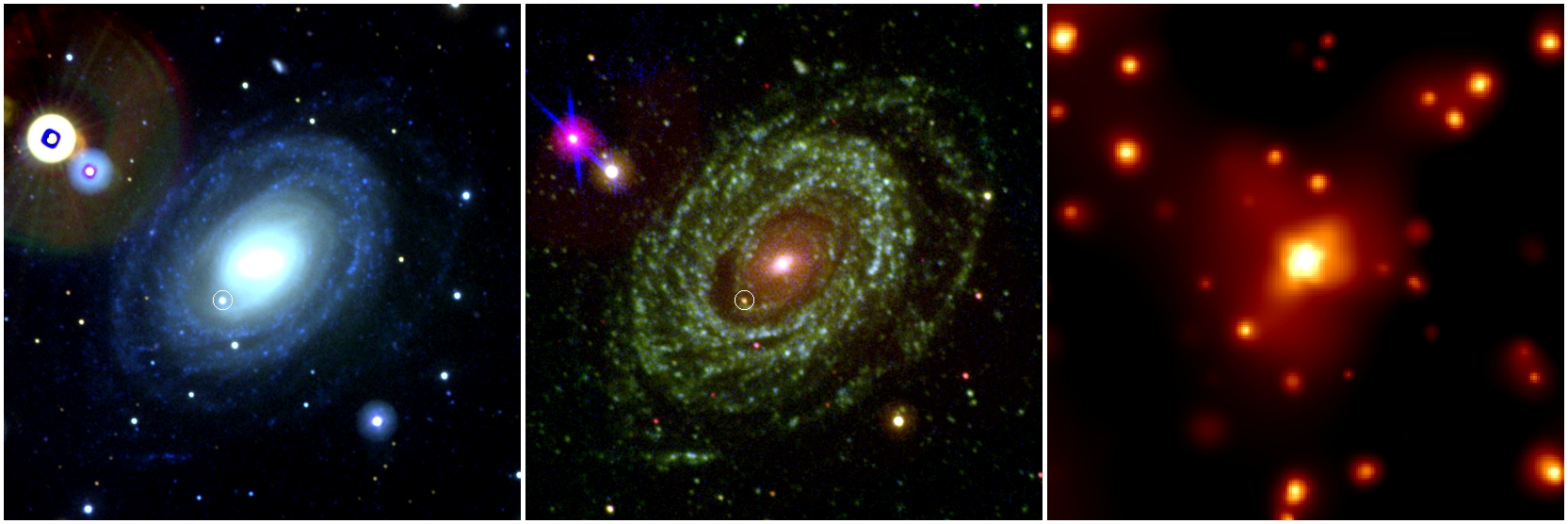
Supernova 2005ke, which was detected in 2005, is a Type Ia supernova, an important "standard candle" explosion used by astronomers to measure distances in the universe. Shown here is the event in optical, ultraviolet and X-ray wavelengths. This is the first X-ray image of a Type Ia, and it has provided observational evidence that Type Ia are the explosion of a white dwarf orbiting a red giant star.

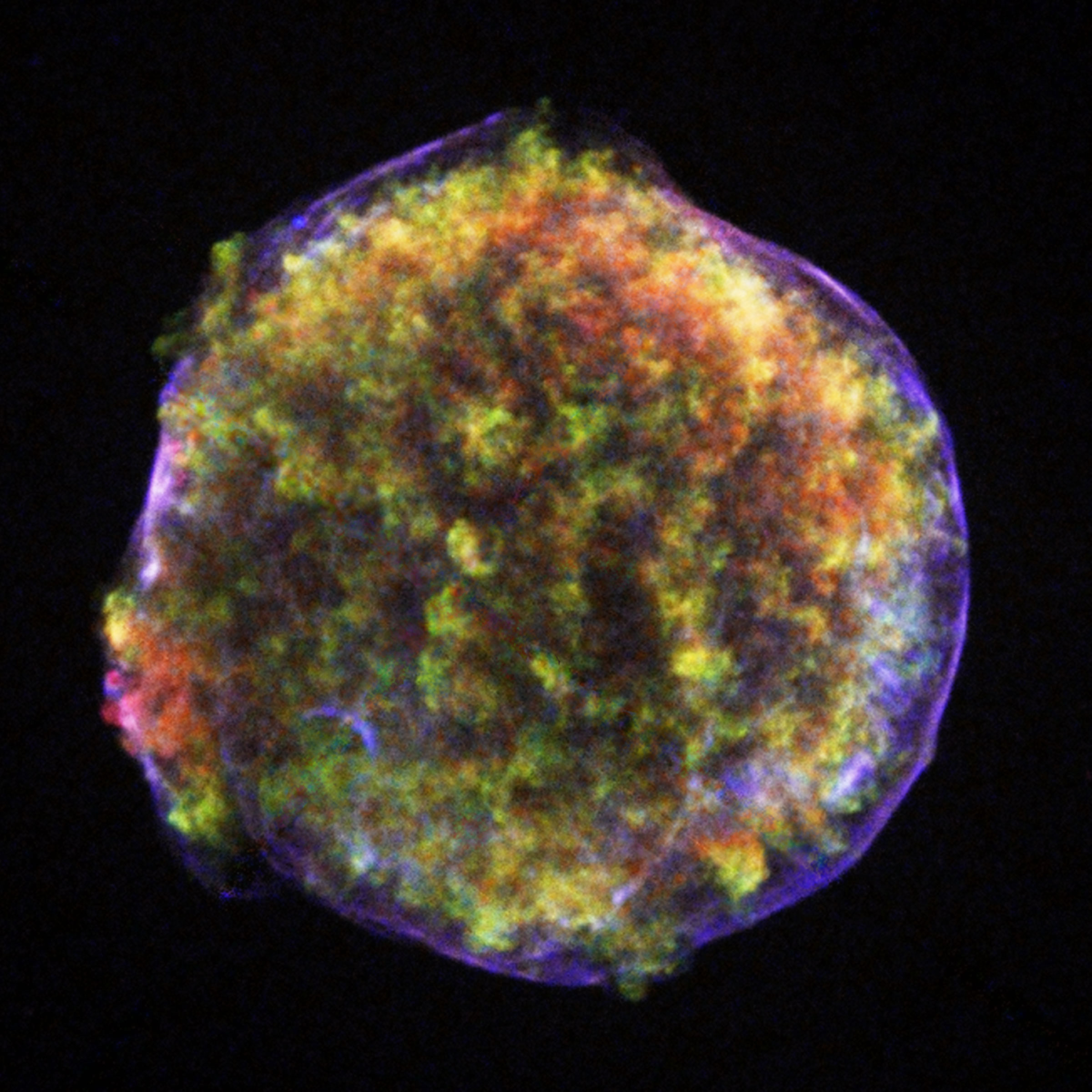
X-ray image of the SN 1572 Type Ia remnant as seen by the Chandra X-ray Observatory

A Type Ia supernova is an explosion of a white dwarf in orbit around either another white dwarf or a red giant star. The dense white dwarf can accumulate gas donated from the companion. When the dwarf reaches the critical mass of 1.4 M_{☉}, a thermonuclear explosion ensues. As each Type Ia shines with a known luminosity, Type Ia are used as "standard candles" to measure distances in the universe.

SN 2005ke is the first Type Ia supernova detected in X-ray wavelengths, and it is much brighter in the ultraviolet than expected.

== X-ray emission from stars ==
=== Vela X-1 ===
Vela X-1 is a pulsing, eclipsing high-mass X-ray binary (HMXB) system, associated with the Uhuru source 4U 0900-40 and the supergiant star HD 77581. The X-ray emission of the neutron star is caused by the capture and accretion of matter from the stellar wind of the supergiant companion. Vela X-1 is the prototypical detached HMXB.

=== Hercules X-1 ===
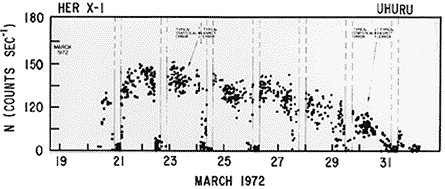
This light curve of Her X-1 shows long term and medium term variability. Each pair of vertical lines delineate the eclipse of the compact object behind its companion star. In this case, the companion is a 2 Solar-mass star with a radius of nearly four times that of the Sun. This eclipse shows us the orbital period of the system, 1.7 days.

An intermediate-mass X-ray binary (IMXB) is a binary star system where one of the components is a neutron star or a black hole. The other component is an intermediate mass star.

Hercules X-1 is composed of a neutron star accreting matter from a normal star (HZ Her) probably due to Roche lobe overflow. X-1 is the prototype for the massive X-ray binaries although it falls on the borderline, ~2 M_{☉}, between high- and low-mass X-ray binaries.

=== Scorpius X-1 ===
The first extrasolar X-ray source was discovered on 12 June 1962. This source is called Scorpius X-1, the first X-ray source found in the constellation of Scorpius, located in the direction of the center of the Milky Way. Scorpius X-1 is some 9,000 ly from Earth and after the Sun is the strongest X-ray source in the sky at energies below 20 keV. Its X-ray output is 2.3 × 10^{31} W, about 60,000 times the total luminosity of the Sun. Scorpius X-1 itself is a neutron star. This system is classified as a low-mass X-ray binary (LMXB); the neutron star is roughly 1.4 solar masses, while the donor star is only 0.42 solar masses.

=== Sun ===
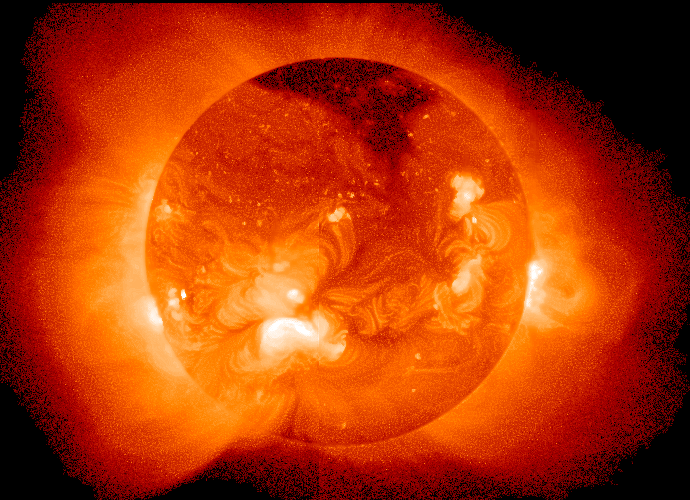
The corona of the Sun as seen in the X-ray region of the electromagnetic spectrum on 8 May 1992 by the soft X-ray telescope on board the Yohkoh solar observatory spacecraft.

In the late 1930s, the presence of a very hot, tenuous gas surrounding the Sun was inferred indirectly from optical coronal lines of highly ionized species. In the mid-1940s radio observations revealed a radio corona around the Sun. After detecting X-ray photons from the Sun in the course of a rocket flight, T. Burnight wrote, "The sun is assumed to be the source of this radiation although radiation of wavelength shorter than 4 Å would not be expected from theoretical estimates of black body radiation from the solar corona." And, of course, people have seen the solar corona in scattered visible light during solar eclipses.

While neutron stars and black holes are the quintessential point sources of X-rays, all main sequence stars are likely to have hot enough coronae to emit X-rays. A- or F-type stars have at most thin convection zones and thus produce little coronal activity.

Similar solar cycle-related variations are observed in the flux of solar X-ray and UV or EUV radiation. Rotation is one of the primary determinants of the magnetic dynamo, but this point could not be demonstrated by observing the Sun: the Sun's magnetic activity is in fact strongly modulated (due to the 11-year magnetic spot cycle), but this effect is not directly dependent on the rotation period.

Solar flares usually follow the solar cycle. CORONAS-F was launched on 31 July 2001 to coincide with the 23rd solar cycle maximum. The solar flare of 29 October 2003 apparently showed a significant degree of linear polarization (> 70% in channels E2 = 40–60 keV and E3 = 60–100 keV, but only about 50% in E1 = 20–40 keV) in hard X-rays, but other observations have generally only set upper limits.

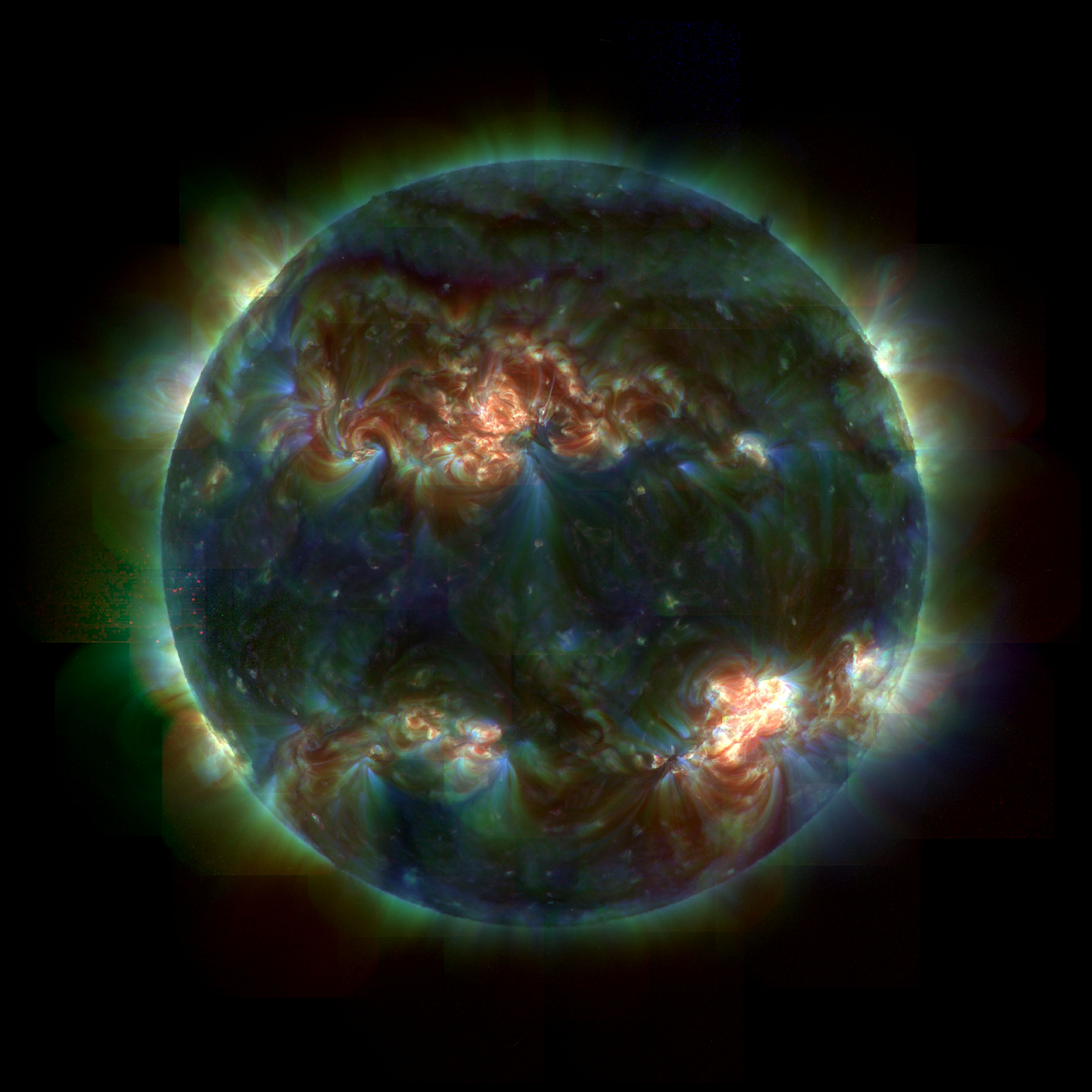
This is a false-color, 3-layer composite from the TRACE observatory: the blue, green, and red channels show the 17.1 nm, 19.5 nm, and 28.4 nm, respectively. These TRACE filters are most sensitive to emission from 1, 1.5, and 2 million degree plasma, thus showing the entire corona and detail of coronal loops in the lower solar atmosphere.

Coronal loops form the basic structure of the lower corona and transition region of the Sun. These highly structured and elegant loops are a direct consequence of the twisted solar magnetic flux within the solar body. The population of coronal loops can be directly linked with the solar cycle, it is for this reason coronal loops are often found with sunspots at their footpoints. Coronal loops populate both active and quiet regions of the solar surface. The Yohkoh Soft X-ray Telescope (SXT) observed X-rays in the 0.25–4.0 keV range, resolving solar features to 2.5 arc seconds with a temporal resolution of 0.5–2 seconds. SXT was sensitive to plasma in the 2–4 MK temperature range, making it an ideal observational platform to compare with data collected from TRACE coronal loops radiating in the EUV wavelengths.

Variations of solar-flare emission in soft X-rays (10–130 nm) and EUV (26–34 nm) recorded on board CORONAS-F demonstrate for most flares observed by CORONAS-F in 2001–2003 UV radiation preceded X-ray emission by 1–10 min.

=== White dwarfs ===
When the core of a medium mass star contracts, it causes a release of energy that makes the envelope of the star expand. This continues until the star finally blows its outer layers off. The core of the star remains intact and becomes a white dwarf. The white dwarf is surrounded by an expanding shell of gas in an object known as a planetary nebula. Planetary nebula seem to mark the transition of a medium mass star from red giant to white dwarf. X-ray images reveal clouds of multimillion degree gas that have been compressed and heated by the fast stellar wind. Eventually the central star collapses to form a white dwarf. For a billion or so years after a star collapses to form a white dwarf, it is "white" hot with surface temperatures of ~20,000 K.

X-ray emission has been detected from PG 1658+441, a hot, isolated, magnetic white dwarf, first detected in an Einstein IPC observation and later identified in an Exosat channel multiplier array observation. "The broad-band spectrum of this DA white dwarf can be explained as emission from a homogeneous, high-gravity, pure hydrogen atmosphere with a temperature near 28,000 K." These observations of PG 1658+441 support a correlation between temperature and helium abundance in white dwarf atmospheres.

A super soft X-ray source (SSXS) radiates soft X-rays in the range of 0.09 to 2.5 keV. Super soft X-rays are believed to be produced by steady nuclear fusion on a white dwarf's surface of material pulled from a binary companion. This requires a flow of material sufficiently high to sustain the fusion.

Real mass transfer variations may be occurring in V Sge similar to SSXS RX J0513.9-6951 as revealed by analysis of the activity of the SSXS V Sge where episodes of long low states occur in a cycle of ~400 days.

HD 49798 is a subdwarf star that forms a binary system with RX J0648.0-4418. The subdwarf star is a bright object in the optical and UV bands. The orbital period of the system is accurately known. Recent XMM-Newton observations timed to coincide with the expected eclipse of the X-ray source allowed an accurate determination of the mass of the X-ray source (at least 1.2 solar masses), establishing the X-ray source as a rare, ultra-massive white dwarf.

=== Brown dwarfs ===
According to theory, an object that has a mass of less than about 8% of the mass of the Sun cannot sustain significant nuclear fusion in its core. This marks the dividing line between red dwarf stars and brown dwarfs. The dividing line between planets and brown dwarfs occurs with objects that have masses below about 1% of the mass of the Sun, or 10 times the mass of Jupiter. These objects cannot fuse deuterium.

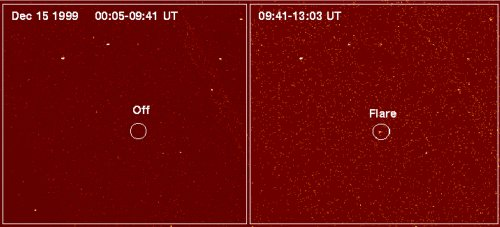
Chandra image of LP 944-20 before flare and during flare.

==== LP 944-20 ====
With no strong central nuclear energy source, the interior of a brown dwarf is in a rapid boiling, or convective state. When combined with the rapid rotation that most brown dwarfs exhibit, convection sets up conditions for the development of a strong, tangled magnetic field near the surface. The flare observed by Chandra from LP 944-20 could have its origin in the turbulent magnetized hot material beneath the brown dwarf's surface. A sub-surface flare could conduct heat to the atmosphere, allowing electric currents to flow and produce an X-ray flare, like a stroke of lightning. The absence of X-rays from LP 944-20 during the non-flaring period is also a significant result. It sets the lowest observational limit on steady X-ray power produced by a brown dwarf star, and shows that coronas cease to exist as the surface temperature of a brown dwarf cools below about 2500 °C and becomes electrically neutral.

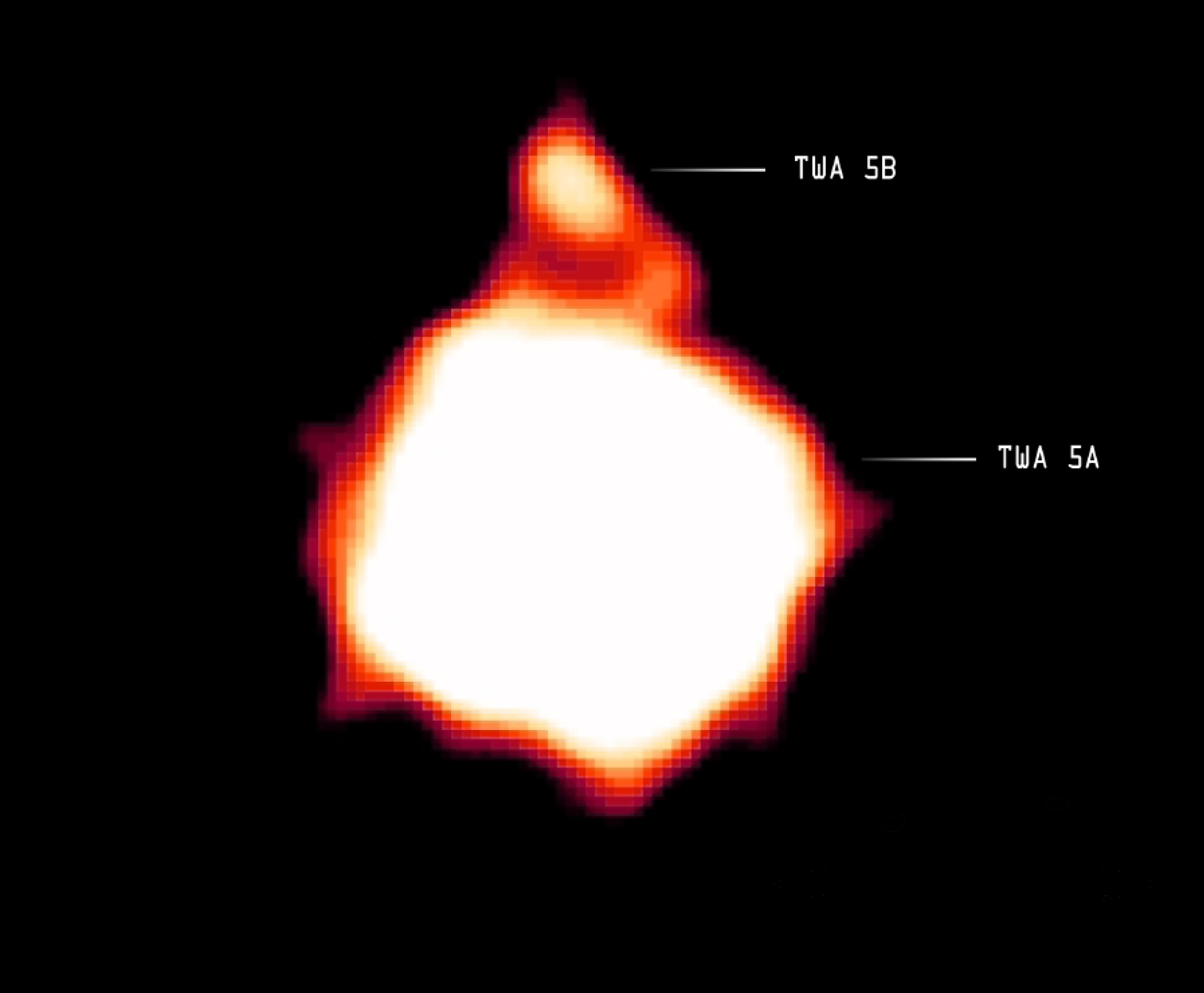
Chandra observation of TWA 5B.

==== TWA 5B ====
Using NASA's Chandra X-ray Observatory, scientists have detected X-rays from a low mass brown dwarf in a multiple star system. This is the first time that a brown dwarf this close to its parent star(s) (Sun-like stars TWA 5A) has been resolved in X-rays. "Our Chandra data show that the X-rays originate from the brown dwarf's coronal plasma which is some 3 million degrees Celsius", said Yohko Tsuboi of Chuo University in Tokyo. "This brown dwarf is as bright as the Sun today in X-ray light, while it is fifty times less massive than the Sun", said Tsuboi. "This observation, thus, raises the possibility that even massive planets might emit X-rays by themselves during their youth!"

== X-ray reflection ==
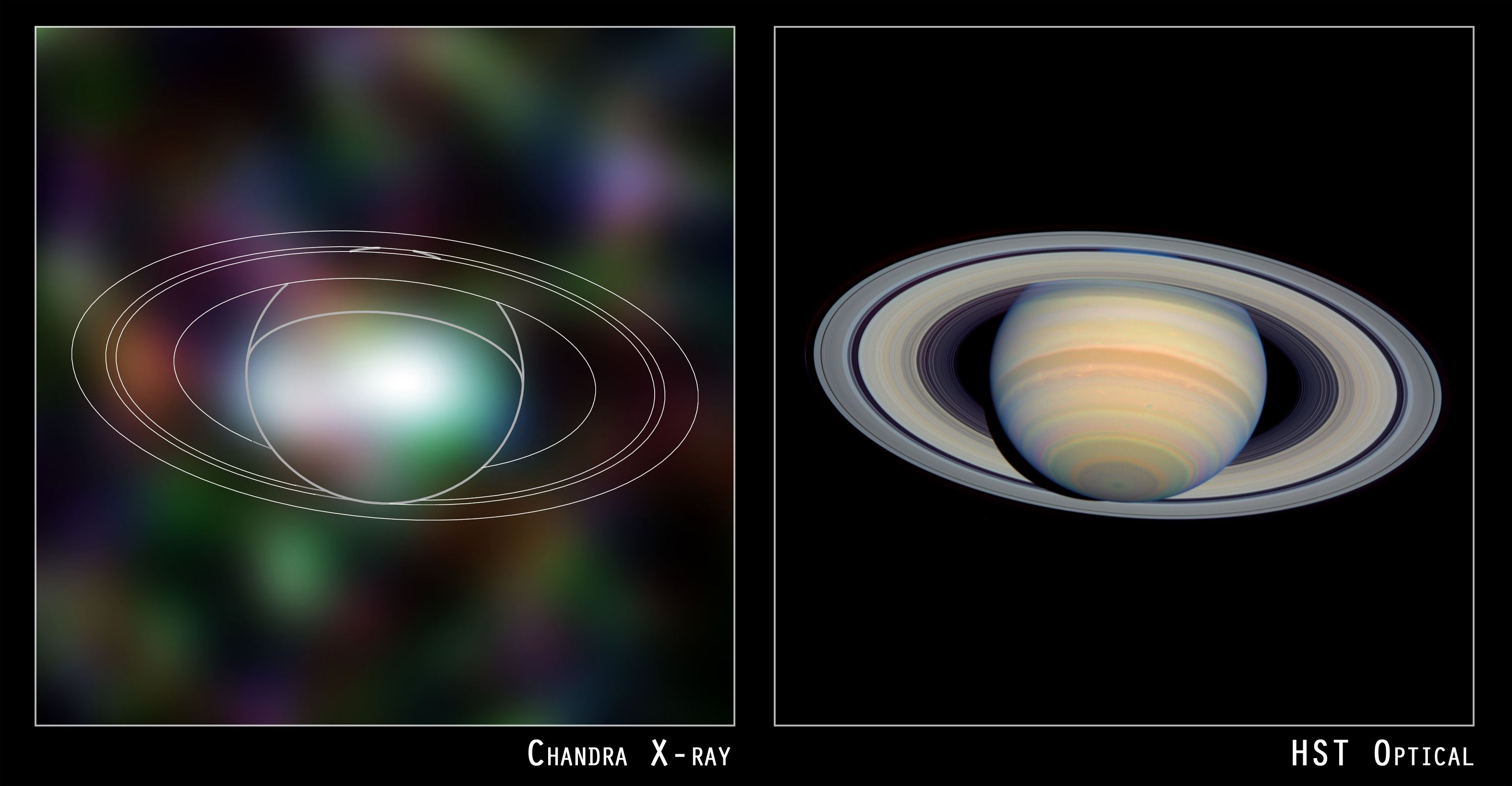
Chandra X-ray (left) and Hubble optical (right) images of Saturn on 14 April 2003. Observation period: 20 hrs, 14–15 April 2003. Color code: red (0.4 – 0.6 keV), green (0.6 – 0.8 keV), blue (0.8 – 1.0 keV).

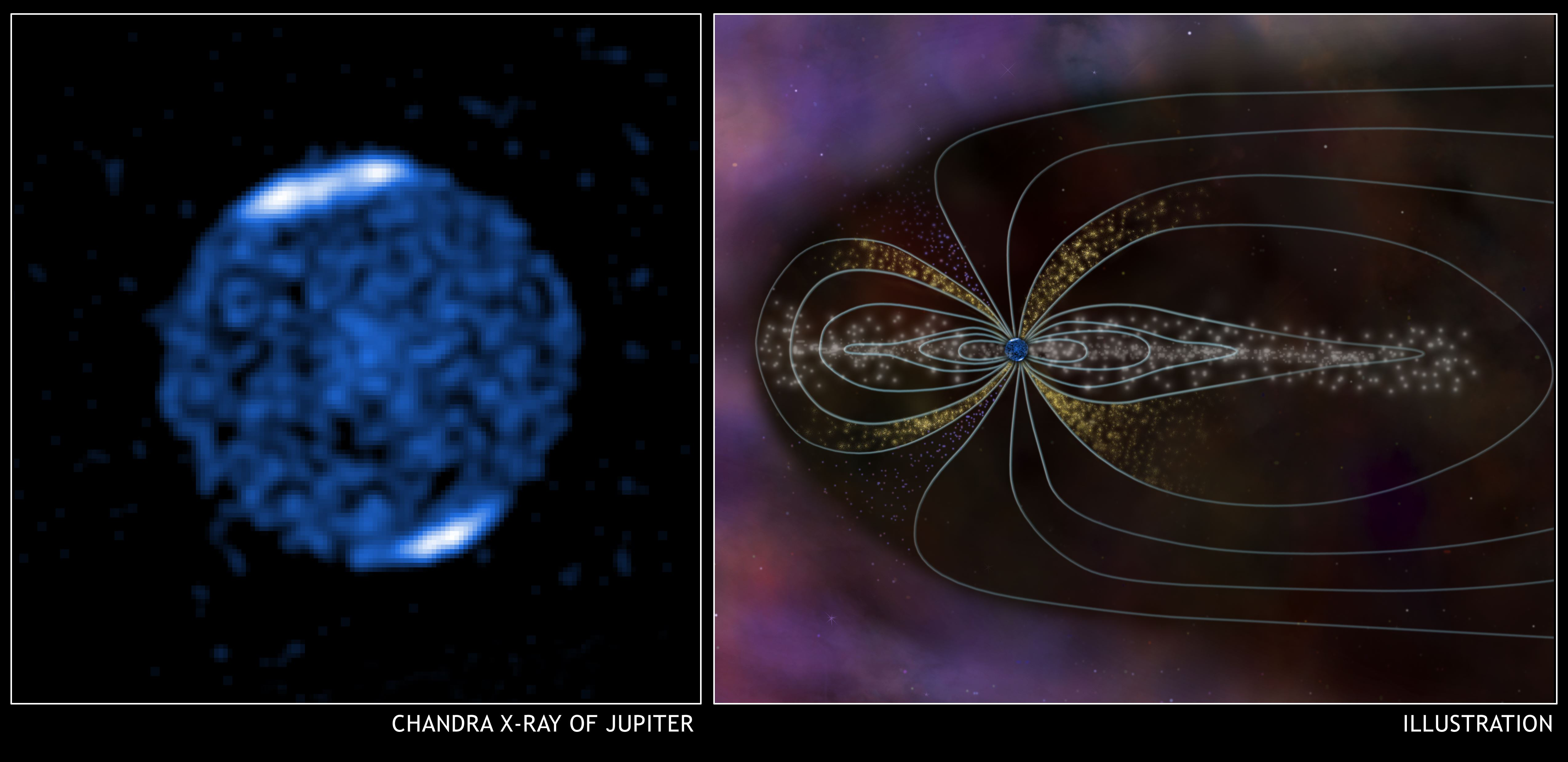
Jupiter shows intense X-ray emission associated with auroras in its polar regions (Chandra observatory X-ray image on the left). The accompanying schematic illustrates how Jupiter's unusually frequent and spectacular auroral activity is produced. Jupiter's strong, rapidly rotating magnetic field (light blue lines) generates strong electric fields in the space around the planet. Charged particles (white dots), trapped in Jupiter's magnetic field, are continually being accelerated (gold particles) down into the atmosphere above the polar regions, so auroras are almost always active on Jupiter. Observation period: 17 hrs, 24–26 February 2003.

Electric potentials of about 10 million volts, and currents of 10 million amps – a hundred times greater than the most powerful lightning bolts – are required to explain the auroras at Jupiter's poles, which are a thousand times more powerful than those on Earth.

On Earth, auroras are triggered by solar storms of energetic particles, which disturb Earth's magnetic field. As shown by the swept-back appearance in the illustration, gusts of particles from the Sun also distort Jupiter's magnetic field, and on occasion produce auroras.

Saturn's X-ray spectrum is similar to that of X-rays from the Sun indicating that Saturn's X-radiation is due to the reflection of solar X-rays by Saturn's atmosphere. The optical image is much brighter, and shows the beautiful ring structures, which were not detected in X-rays.

== X-ray fluorescence ==
Some of the detected X-rays, originating from solar system bodies other than the Sun, are produced by fluorescence. Scattered solar X-rays provide an additional component.

In the Röntgensatellit (ROSAT) image of the Moon, pixel brightness corresponds to X-ray intensity. The bright lunar hemisphere shines in X-rays because it re-emits X-rays originating from the sun. The background sky has an X-ray glow in part due to the myriad of distant, powerful active galaxies, unresolved in the ROSAT picture. The dark side of the Moon's disk shadows this X-ray background radiation coming from the deep space. A few X-rays only seem to come from the shadowed lunar hemisphere. Instead, they originate in Earth's geocorona or extended atmosphere which surrounds the orbiting X-ray observatory. The measured lunar X-ray luminosity of ~1.2 × 10^{5} W makes the Moon one of the weakest known non-terrestrial X-ray sources.

=== Comet detection ===
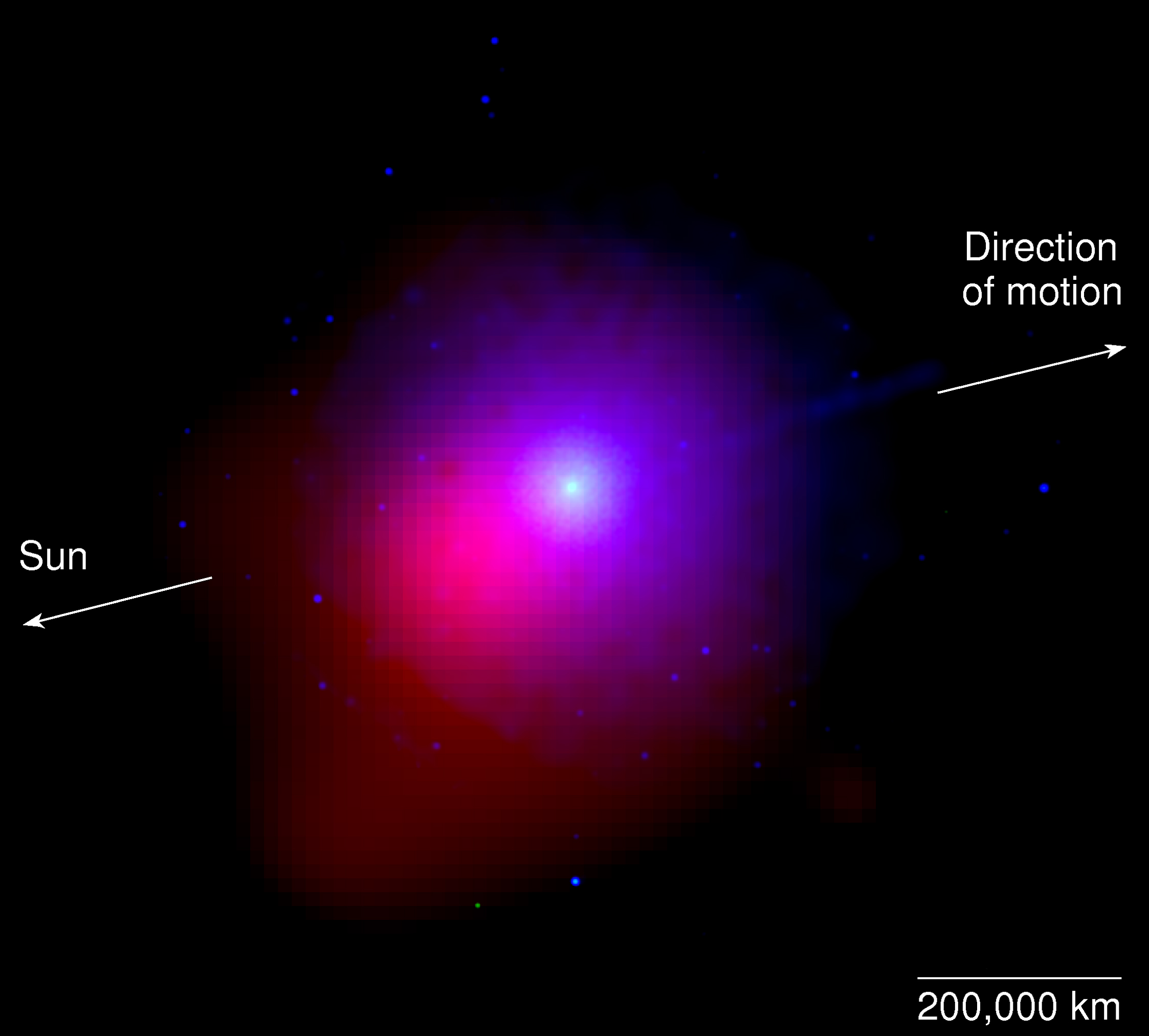
Comet Lulin was passing through the constellation Libra when Swift imaged it on 28 January 2009. This image merges data acquired by Swift's Ultraviolet/Optical Telescope (blue and green) and X-Ray Telescope (red). At the time of the observation, the comet was 99.5 million miles from Earth and 115.3 million miles from the Sun.

NASA's Swift Gamma-Ray Burst Mission satellite was monitoring Comet Lulin as it closed to 63 million km of Earth. For the first time, astronomers can see simultaneous UV and X-ray images of a comet. "The solar wind – a fast-moving stream of particles from the sun – interacts with the comet's broader cloud of atoms. This causes the solar wind to light up with X-rays, and that's what Swift's XRT sees", said Stefan Immler, of the Goddard Space Flight Center. This interaction, called charge exchange, results in X-rays from most comets when they pass within about three times Earth's distance from the sun. Because Lulin is so active, its atomic cloud is especially dense. As a result, the X-ray-emitting region extends far sunward of the comet.

== Celestial X-ray sources ==
The celestial sphere has been divided into 88 constellations. The IAU constellations are areas of the sky. Each of these contains remarkable X-ray sources. Some of them are galaxies or black holes at the centers of galaxies. Some are pulsars. As with the astronomical X-ray sources, striving to understand the generation of X-rays by the apparent source helps to understand the Sun, the universe as a whole, and how these affect us on Earth.

=== Andromeda ===
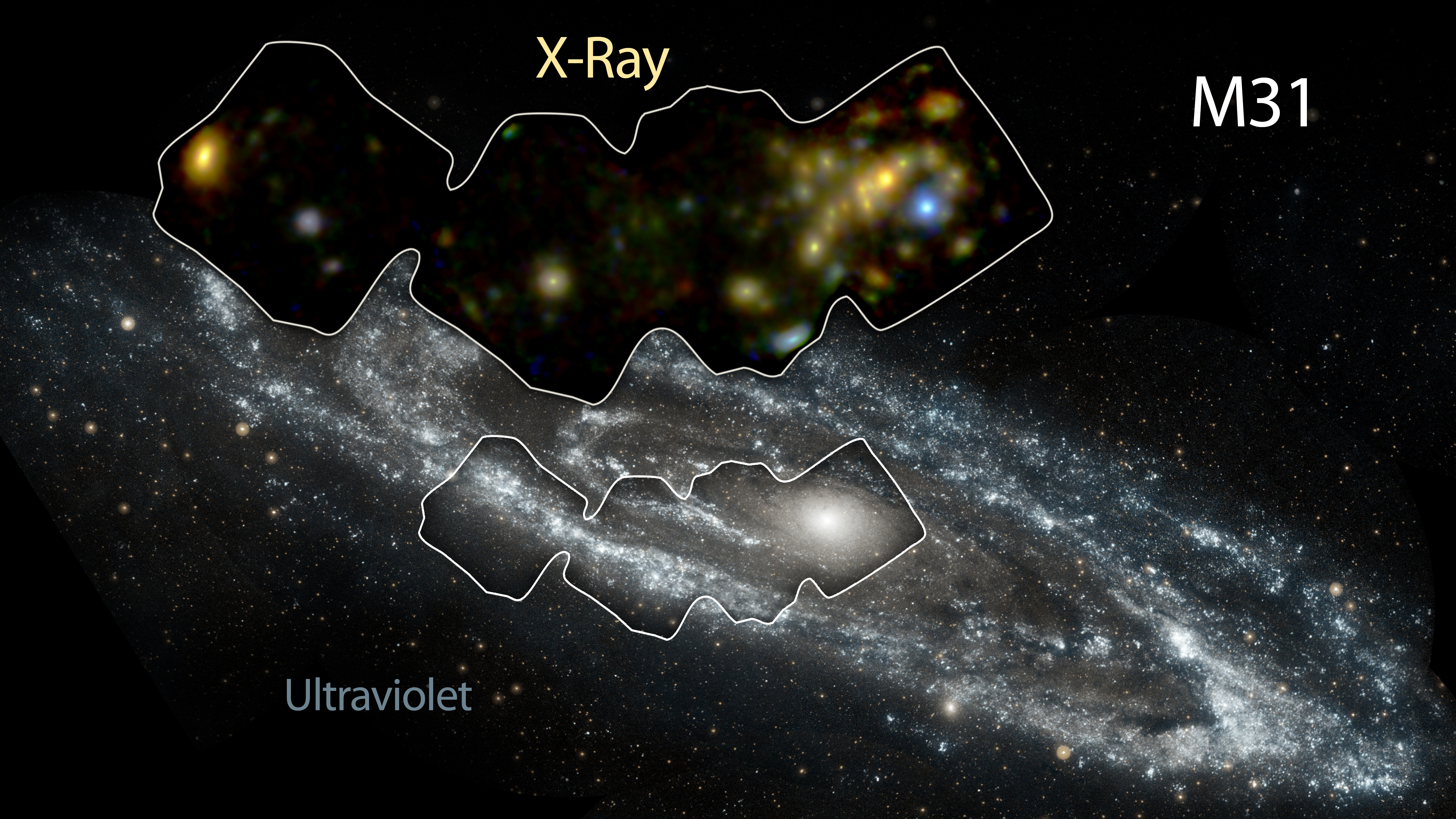
Andromeda Galaxy – in high-energy X-ray and ultraviolet light (released 5 January 2016).

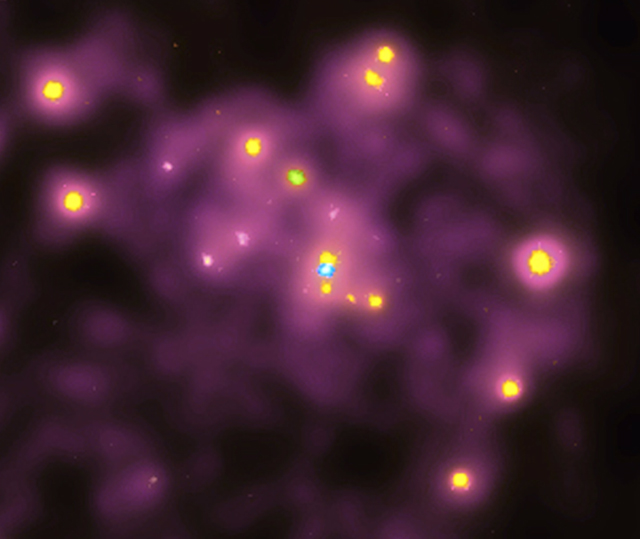
Using the orbiting Chandra X-ray telescope, astronomers have imaged the center of our near-twin island universe, finding evidence for a bizarre object. Like the Milky Way, Andromeda's galactic center appears to harbor an X-ray source characteristic of a black hole of a million or more solar masses. Seen above, the false-color X-ray picture shows a number of X-ray sources, likely X-ray binary stars, within Andromeda's central region as yellowish dots. The blue source located right at the galaxy's center is coincident with the position of the suspected massive black hole. While the X-rays are produced as material falls into the black hole and heats up, estimates from the X-ray data show Andromeda's central source to be very cold – only about million degrees, compared to the tens of millions of degrees indicated for Andromeda's X-ray binaries.

Multiple X-ray sources have been detected in the Andromeda Galaxy, using observations from the ESA's XMM-Newton orbiting observatory.

=== Boötes ===
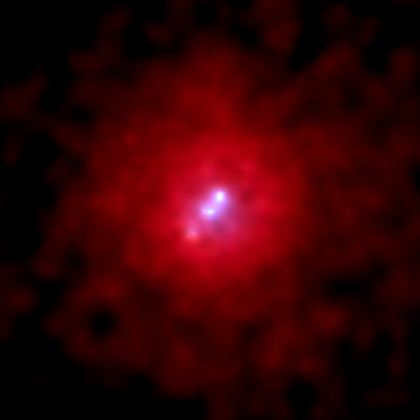
Chandra image of 3C 295, a strongly X-ray emitting galaxy cluster in the constellation Boötes. The cluster is filled with gas. Image is 42 arcsec across. RA 14^{h} 11^{m} 20^{s} Dec −52° 12' 21". Observation date: 30 August 1999. Instrument: ACIS. Aka: Cl 1409+524

3C 295 (Cl 1409+524) in Boötes is one of the most distant galaxy clusters observed by X-ray telescopes. The cluster is filled with a vast cloud of 50 MK gas that radiates strongly in X rays. Chandra observed that the central galaxy is a strong, complex source of X rays.

=== Camelopardalis ===
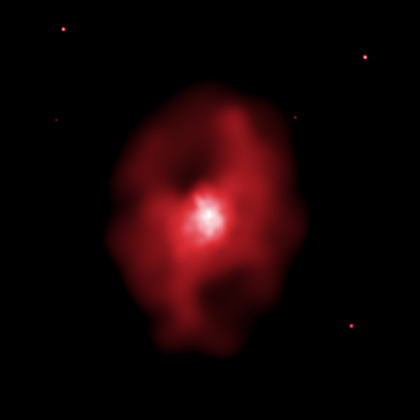
Chandra image of the hot X-ray emitting gas that pervades the galaxy cluster MS 0735.6+7421 in Camelopardalis. Two vast cavities – each 600,000 lyrs in diameter appear on opposite sides of a large galaxy at the center of the cluster. These cavities are filled with a two-sided, elongated, magnetized bubble of extremely high-energy electrons that emit radio waves. Image is 4.2 arcmin per side. RA 07^{h} 41^{m} 50.20^{s} Dec +74° 14' 51.00" in Camelopardalis. Observation date: 30 November 2003.

Hot X-ray emitting gas pervades the galaxy cluster MS 0735.6+7421 in Camelopardalis. Two vast cavities – each 600,000 lyrs in diameter appear on opposite sides of a large galaxy at the center of the cluster. These cavities are filled with a two-sided, elongated, magnetized bubble of extremely high-energy electrons that emit radio waves.

=== Canes Venatici ===
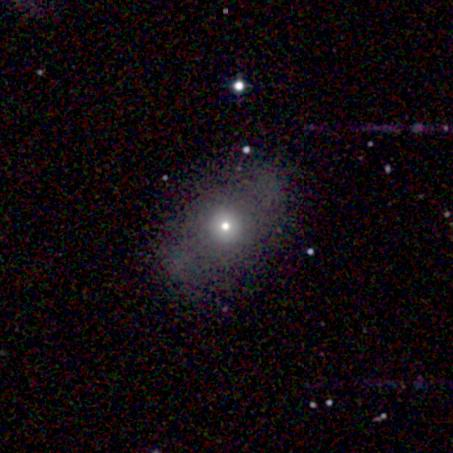
A near-infrared image of NGC 4151.

The X-ray landmark NGC 4151, an intermediate spiral Seyfert galaxy has a massive black hole in its core.

=== Canis Major ===
A Chandra X-ray image of Sirius A and B shows Sirius B to be more luminous than Sirius A. Whereas in the visual range, Sirius A is the more luminous.

=== Cassiopeia ===
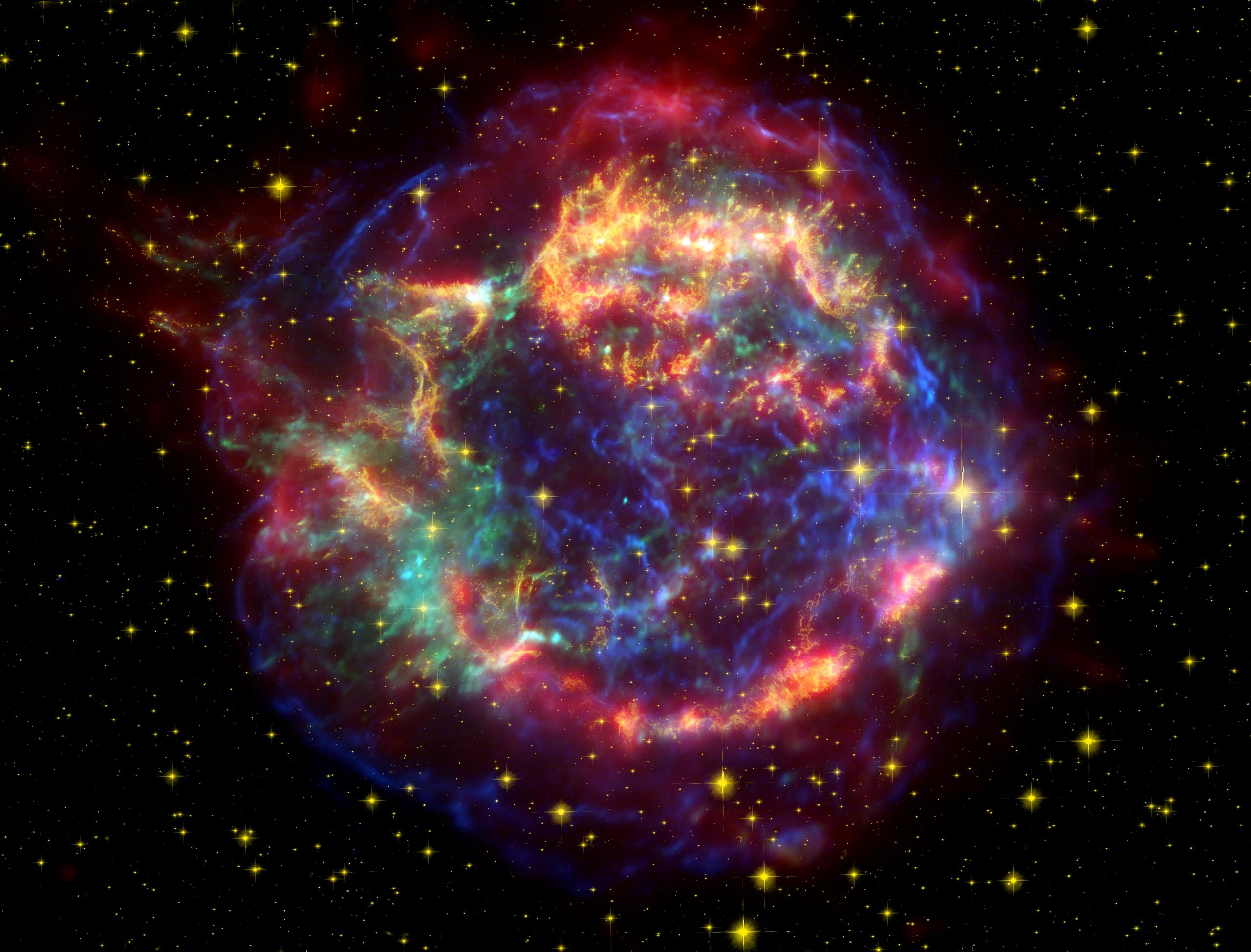
Cassiopeia A: a false color image composited of data from three sources. Red is infrared data from the Spitzer Space Telescope, orange is visible data from the Hubble Space Telescope, and blue and green are data from the Chandra X-ray Observatory.

Regarding Cassiopea A SNR, it is believed that first light from the stellar explosion reached Earth approximately 300 years ago but there are no historical records of any sightings of the progenitor supernova, probably due to interstellar dust absorbing optical wavelength radiation before it reached Earth (although it is possible that it was recorded as a sixth magnitude star 3 Cassiopeiae by John Flamsteed on 16 August 1680). Possible explanations lean toward the idea that the source star was unusually massive and had previously ejected much of its outer layers. These outer layers would have cloaked the star and reabsorbed much of the light released as the inner star collapsed.

CTA 1 is another SNR X-ray source in Cassiopeia. A pulsar in the CTA 1 supernova remnant (4U 0000+72) initially emitted radiation in the X-ray bands (1970–1977). Strangely, when it was observed at a later time (2008) X-ray radiation was not detected. Instead, the Fermi Gamma-ray Space Telescope detected the pulsar was emitting gamma ray radiation, the first of its kind.

=== Carina ===
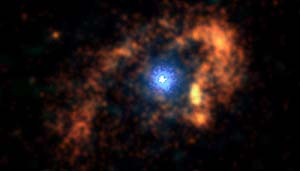
Classified as a peculiar star, Eta Carinae exhibits a superstar at its center as seen in this image from Chandra. The new X-ray observation shows three distinct structures: an outer, horseshoe-shaped ring about 2 light years in diameter, a hot inner core about 3 light-months in diameter, and a hot central source less than 1 light-month in diameter which may contain the superstar that drives the whole show. The outer ring provides evidence of another large explosion that occurred over 1,000 years ago.

Three structures around Eta Carinae are thought to represent shock waves produced by matter rushing away from the superstar at supersonic speeds. The temperature of the shock-heated gas ranges from 60 MK in the central regions to 3 MK on the horseshoe-shaped outer structure. "The Chandra image contains some puzzles for existing ideas of how a star can produce such hot and intense X-rays," says Prof. Kris Davidson of the University of Minnesota.

=== Cetus ===
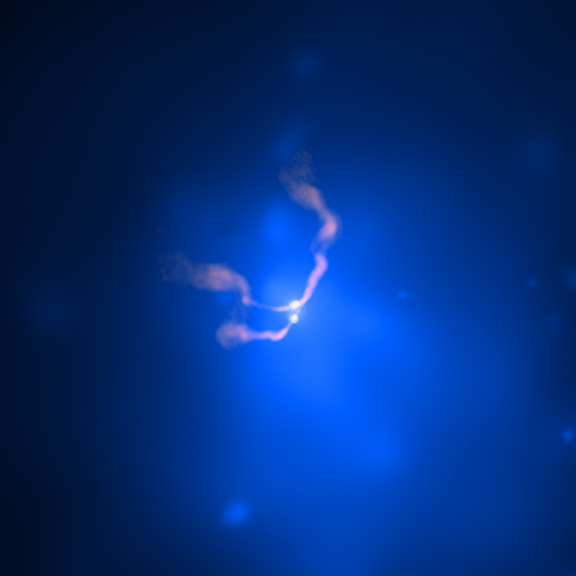
Two supermassive black holes spiraling towards merger near the center of NGC 1128, some 25,000 light years away from each other.

Abell 400 is a galaxy cluster, containing a galaxy (NGC 1128) with two supermassive black holes 3C 75 spiraling towards merger.

=== Chamaeleon ===
The Chamaeleon complex is a large star forming region (SFR) that includes the Chamaeleon I, Chamaeleon II, and Chamaeleon III dark clouds. It occupies nearly all of the constellation and overlaps into Apus, Musca, and Carina. The mean density of X-ray sources is about one source per square degree.

==== Chamaeleon I dark cloud ====
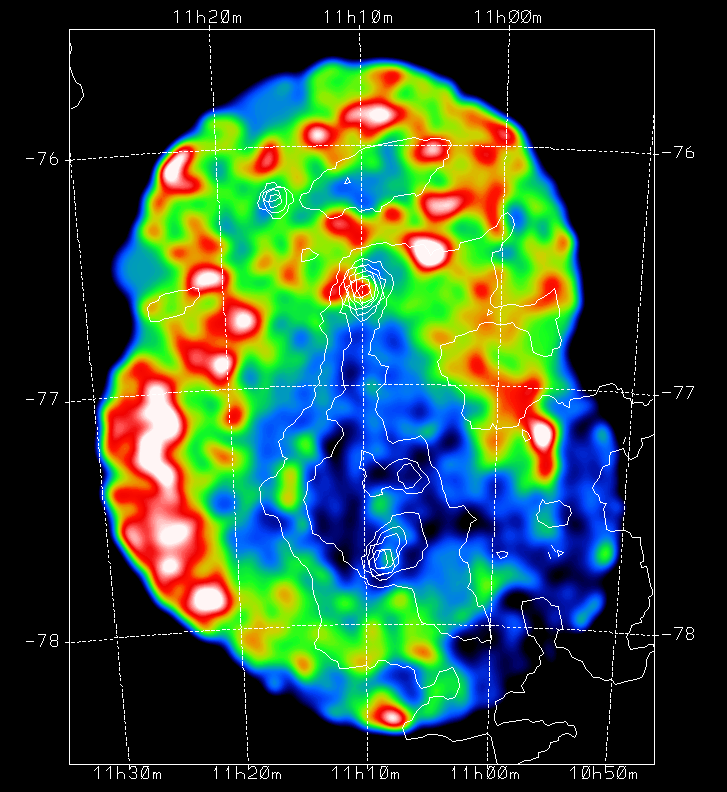
This shows a ROSAT false-color image in X-rays between 500 eV and 1.1 keV of the Chamaeleon I dark cloud. The contours are 100 μm emission from dust measured by the IRAS satellite.

The Chamaeleon I (Cha I) cloud is a coronal cloud and one of the nearest active star formation regions at ~160 pc. It is relatively isolated from other star-forming clouds, so it is unlikely that older pre-main sequence (PMS) stars have drifted into the field. The total stellar population is 200–300. The Cha I cloud is further divided into the North cloud or region and South cloud or main cloud.

==== Chamaeleon II dark cloud ====
The Chamaeleon II dark cloud contains some 40 X-ray sources. Observation in Chamaeleon II was carried out from 10 to 17 September 1993. Source RXJ 1301.9-7706, a new WTTS candidate of spectral type K1, is closest to 4U 1302–77.

==== Chamaeleon III dark cloud ====
"Chamaeleon III appears to be devoid of current star-formation activity." HD 104237 (spectral type A4e) observed by ASCA, located in the Chamaeleon III dark cloud, is the brightest Herbig Ae/Be star in the sky.

=== Corona Borealis ===
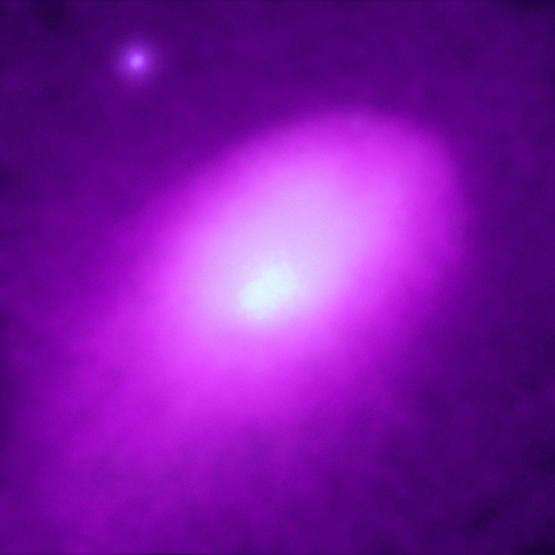
Chandra X-ray Observatory image of the galaxy cluster Abell 2142.

The galaxy cluster Abell 2142 emits X-rays and is in Corona Borealis. It is one of the most massive objects in the universe.

=== Corvus ===
From the Chandra X-ray analysis of the Antennae Galaxies rich deposits of neon, magnesium, and silicon were discovered. These elements are among those that form the building blocks for habitable planets. The clouds imaged contain magnesium and silicon at 16 and 24 times respectively, the abundance in the Sun.

=== Crater ===
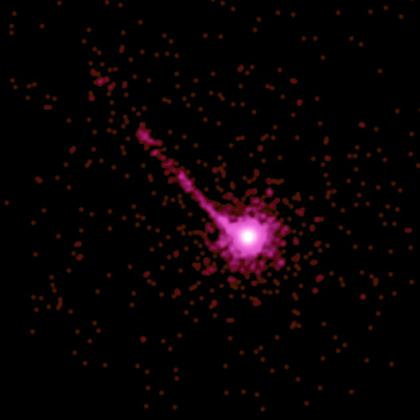
The Chandra X-ray image is of the quasar PKS 1127-145, a highly luminous source of X-rays and visible light about 10 billion light years from Earth. An enormous X-ray jet extends at least a million light years from the quasar. Image is 60 arcsec on a side. RA 11h 30 m 7.10s Dec −14° 49' 27" in Crater. Observation date: 28 May 2000. Instrument: ACIS.

The jet exhibited in X-rays coming from PKS 1127-145 is likely due to the collision of a beam of high-energy electrons with microwave photons.

=== Draco ===
The Draco nebula (a soft X-ray shadow) is outlined by contours and is blue-black in the image by ROSAT of a portion of the constellation Draco.

Abell 2256 is a galaxy cluster of more than 500 galaxies. The double structure of this ROSAT image shows the merging of two clusters.

=== Eridanus ===
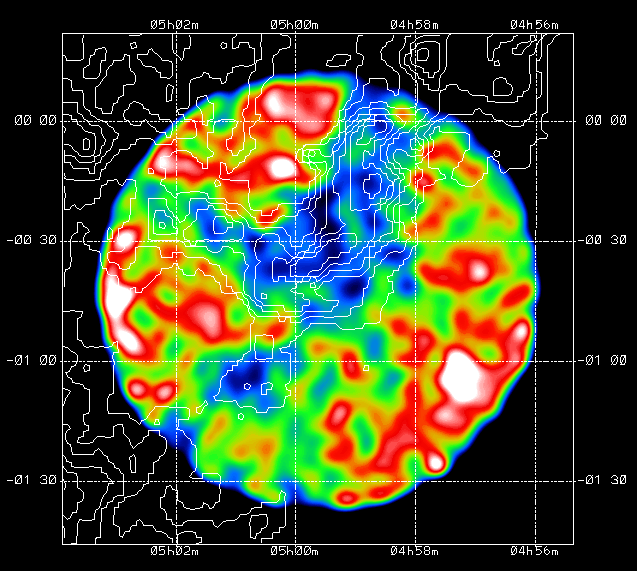
This ROSAT PSPC false-color image is of a portion of a nearby stellar wind superbubble (the Orion-Eridanus Bubble) stretching across Eridanus and Orion. Soft X-rays are emitted by hot gas (T ~ 2–3 MK) in the interior of the superbubble. This bright object forms the background for the "shadow" of a filament of gas and dust. The filament is shown by the overlaid contours, which represent 100 micrometre emission from dust at a temperature of about 30 K as measured by IRAS. Here the filament absorbs soft X-rays between 100 and 300 eV, indicating that the hot gas is located behind the filament. This filament may be part of a shell of neutral gas that surrounds the hot bubble. Its interior is energized by UV light and stellar winds from hot stars in the Orion OB1 association. These stars energize a superbubble about 1200 lys across which is observed in the optical (Hα) and X-ray portions of the spectrum.

Within the constellations Orion and Eridanus and stretching across them is a soft X-ray "hot spot" known as the Orion-Eridanus Superbubble, the Eridanus Soft X-ray Enhancement, or simply the Eridanus Bubble, a 25° area of interlocking arcs of Hα emitting filaments.

=== Hydra ===
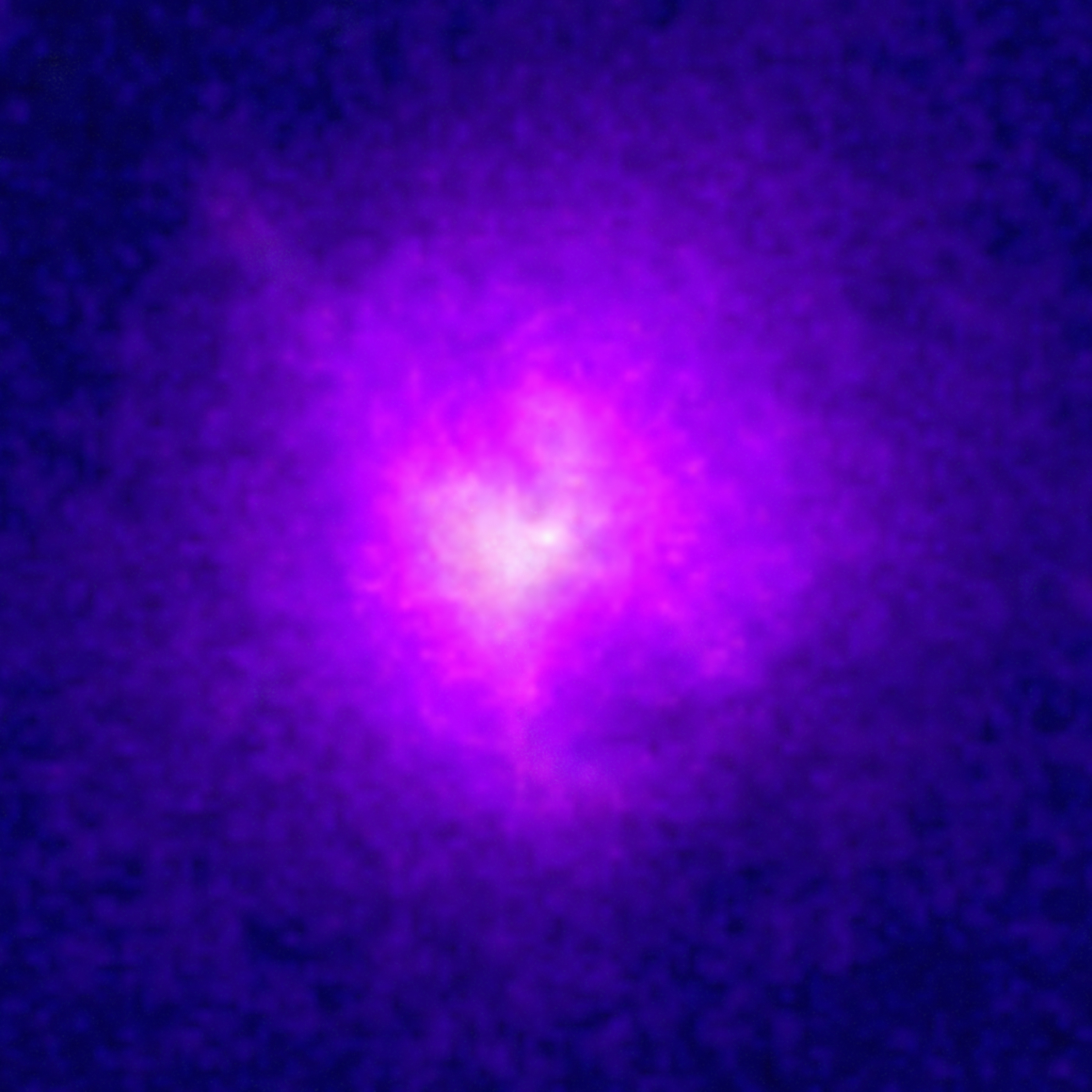
This Chandra X-ray image reveals a large cloud of hot gas that extends throughout the Hydra A galaxy cluster. Image is 2.7 arcmin across. RA 09^{h} 18^{m} 06^{s} Dec −12° 05' 45" in Hydra. Observation date: 30 October 1999. Instrument: ACIS.

A large cloud of hot gas extends throughout the Hydra A galaxy cluster.

=== Leo Minor ===
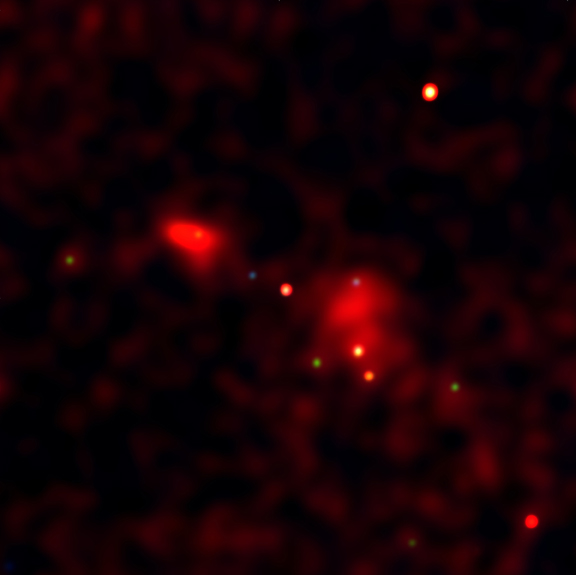
Chandra image of two galaxies (Arp 270) in the early stage of a merger in the constellation Leo Minor. In the image, red represents low, green intermediate, and blue high-energy (temperature) X-rays. Image is 4 arcmin on a side. RA 10h 49 m 52.5s Dec +32° 59' 6". Observation date: 28 April 2001. Instrument: ACIS.

Arp260 is an X-ray source in Leo Minor at RA 10^{h} 49^{m} 52.5^{s} Dec +32° 59′ 6″.

=== Orion ===
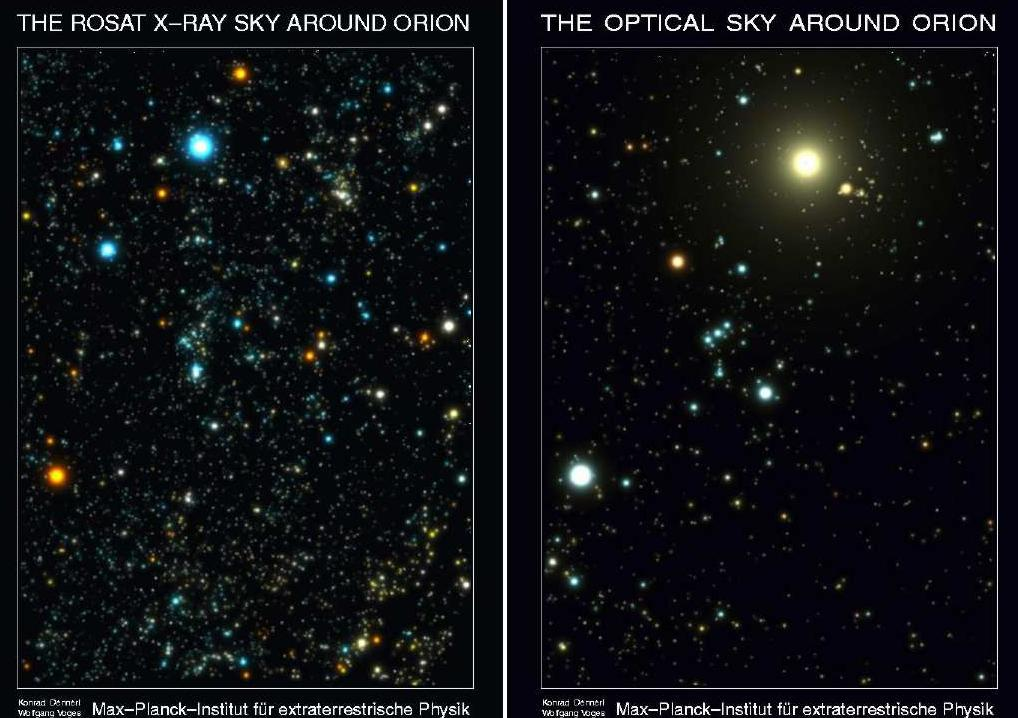
On the right is the visual image of the constellation Orion. On the left is Orion as seen in X-rays only. Betelgeuse is easily seen above the three stars of Orion's belt on the right. The X-ray colors represent the temperature of the X-ray emission from each star: hot stars are blue-white and cooler stars are yellow-red. The brightest object in the optical image is the full moon, which is also in the X-ray image. The X-ray image was actually obtained by the ROSAT satellite during the All-Sky Survey phase in 1990–1991.

In the adjacent images are the constellation Orion. On the right side of the images is the visual image of the constellation. On the left is Orion as seen in X-rays only. Betelgeuse is easily seen above the three stars of Orion's belt on the right. The brightest object in the visual image is the full moon, which is also in the X-ray image. The X-ray colors represent the temperature of the X-ray emission from each star: hot stars are blue-white and cooler stars are yellow-red.

=== Pegasus ===
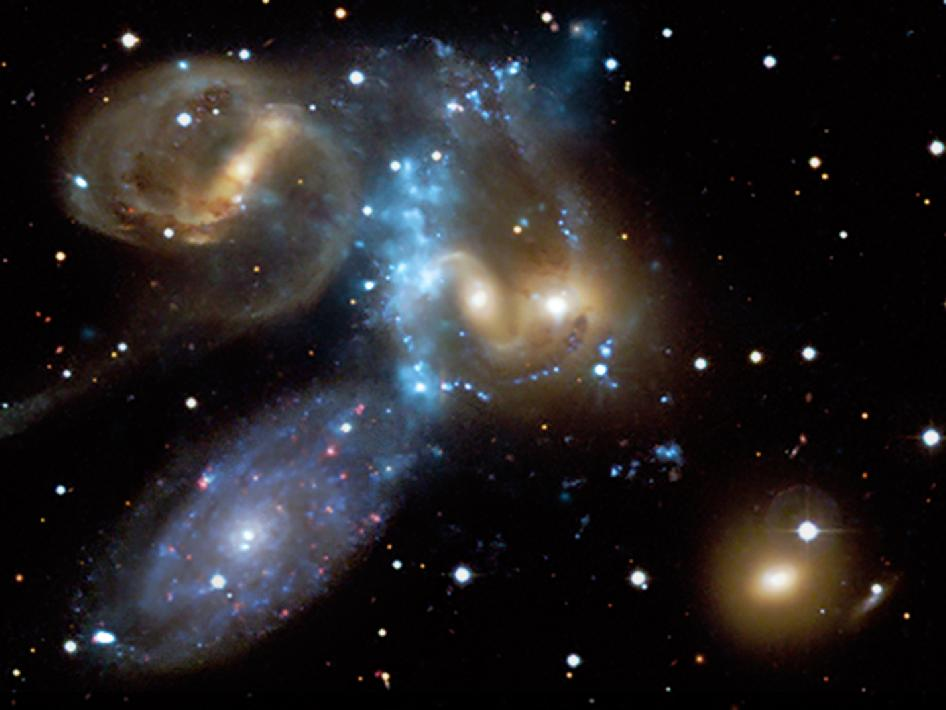
Stephan's Quintet, a compact group of galaxies discovered about 130 years ago and located about 280 million light years from Earth, provides a rare opportunity to observe a galaxy group in the process of evolving from an X-ray faint system dominated by spiral galaxies to a more developed system dominated by elliptical galaxies and bright X-ray emission. Being able to witness the dramatic effect of collisions in causing this evolution is important for increasing our understanding of the origins of the hot, X-ray bright halos of gas in groups of galaxies.

Stephan's Quintet are of interest because of their violent collisions. Four of the five galaxies in Stephan's Quintet form a physical association, and are involved in a cosmic dance that most likely will end with the galaxies merging. As NGC 7318B collides with gas in the group, a huge shock wave bigger than the Milky Way spreads throughout the medium between the galaxies, heating some of the gas to temperatures of millions of degrees where they emit X-rays detectable with the NASA Chandra X-ray Observatory. NGC 7319 has a type 2 Seyfert nucleus.

=== Perseus ===
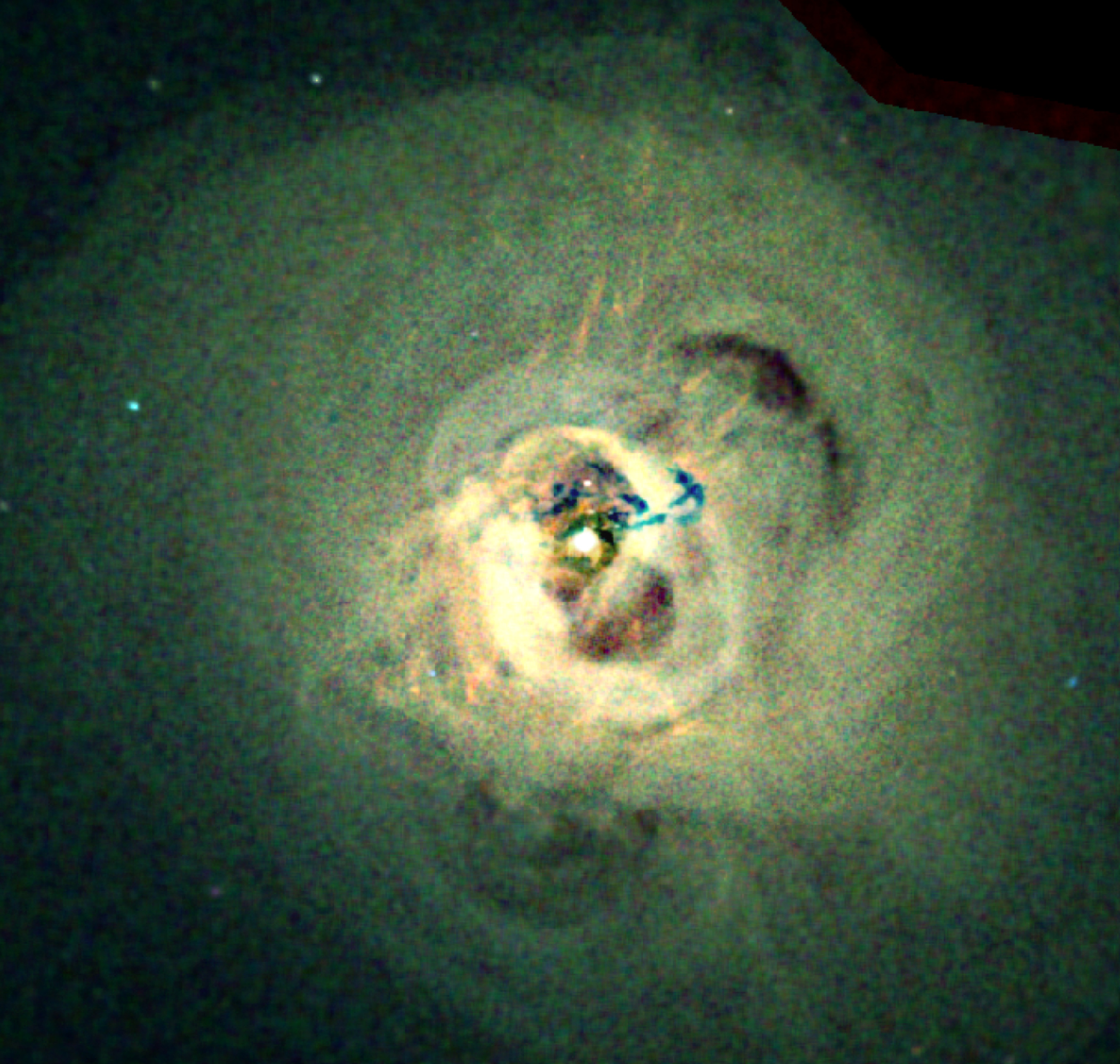
Chandra observations of the central regions of the Perseus galaxy cluster. Image is 284 arcsec across. RA 03^{h} 19^{m} 47.60^{s} Dec +41° 30' 37.00" in Perseus. Observation dates: 13 pointings between 8 August 2002 and 20 October 2004. Color code: Energy (Red 0.3–1.2 keV, Green 1.2-2 keV, Blue 2–7 keV). Instrument: ACIS.

The Perseus galaxy cluster is one of the most massive objects in the universe, containing thousands of galaxies immersed in a vast cloud of multimillion degree gas.

=== Pictor ===
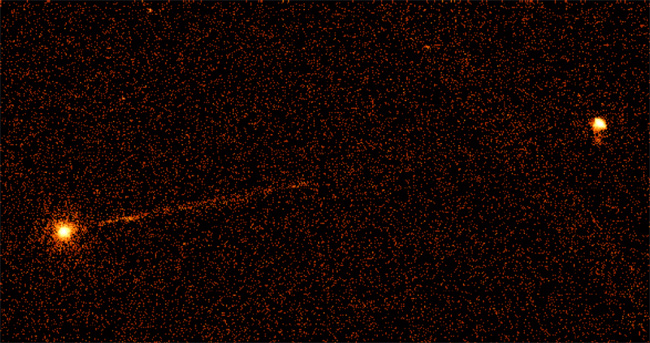
This Chandra X-ray image of Radio Galaxy Pictor A shows a spectacular jet emanating from the center of the galaxy (left) and extends across 360 thousand lyr toward a brilliant hot spot. Image is 4.2 arcmin across. RA 05h 19 m 49.70s Dec −45° 46' 45" in Pictor. Instrument: ACIS.

Pictor A is a galaxy that may have a black hole at its center which has emitted magnetized gas at extremely high speed. The bright spot at the right in the image is the head of the jet. As it plows into the tenuous gas of intergalactic space, it emits X-rays. Pictor A is X-ray source designated H 0517-456 and 3U 0510-44.

=== Puppis ===
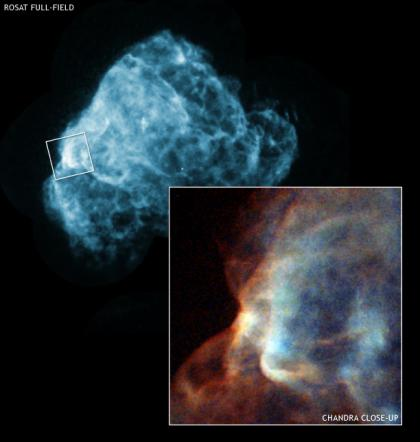
The Chandra three-color image (inset) is a region of the supernova remnant Puppis A (wide-angle view from ROSAT in blue). reveals a cloud being torn apart by a shock wave produced in a supernova explosion. ROSAT image is 88 arcmin across; Chandra image 8 arcmin across. RA 08^{h} 23^{m} 08.16^{s} Dec −42° 41' 41.40" in Puppis. Observation date: 4 September 2005. Color code: Energy (Red 0.4–0.7 keV; Green 0.7–1.2 keV; Blue 1.2–10 keV). Instrument: ACIS.

Puppis A is a supernova remnant (SNR) about 10 light-years in diameter. The supernova occurred approximately 3700 years ago.

=== Sagittarius ===
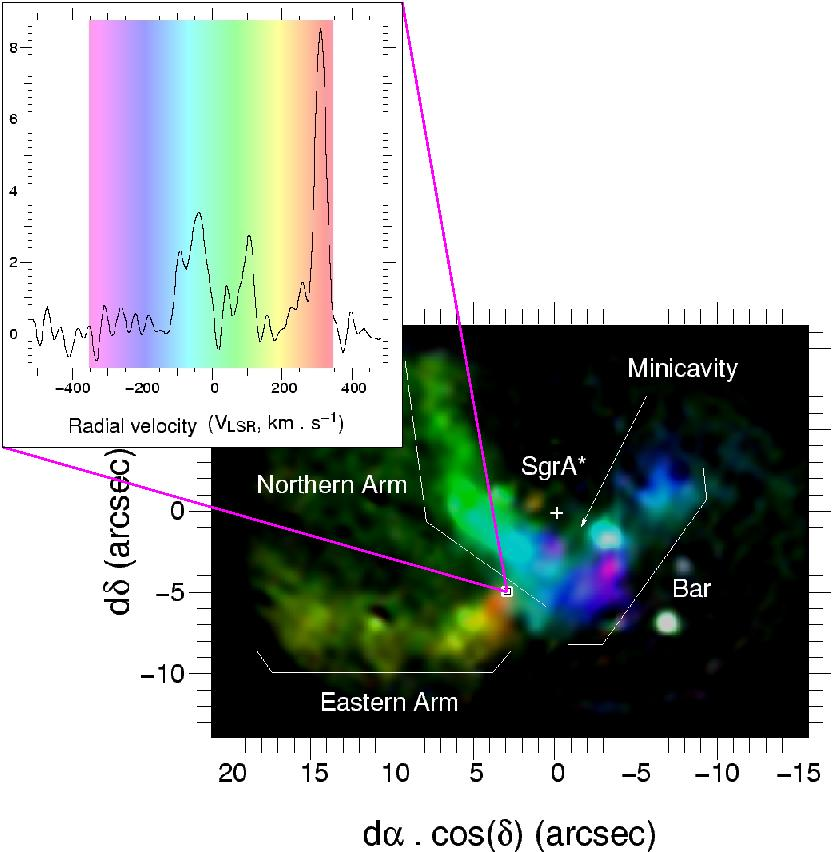
Sagittarius A (or Sgr A) is a complex at the center of the Milky Way. It consists of three overlapping components, the SNR Sagittarius A East, the spiral structure Sagittarius A West, and a very bright compact radio source at the center of the spiral, Sagittarius A*.

The Galactic Center is at 1745–2900 which corresponds to Sagittarius A*, very near to radio source Sagittarius A (W24). In probably the first catalogue of galactic X-ray sources, two Sgr X-1s are suggested: (1) at 1744–2312 and (2) at 1755–2912, noting that (2) is an uncertain identification. Source (1) seems to correspond to S11.

=== Sculptor ===
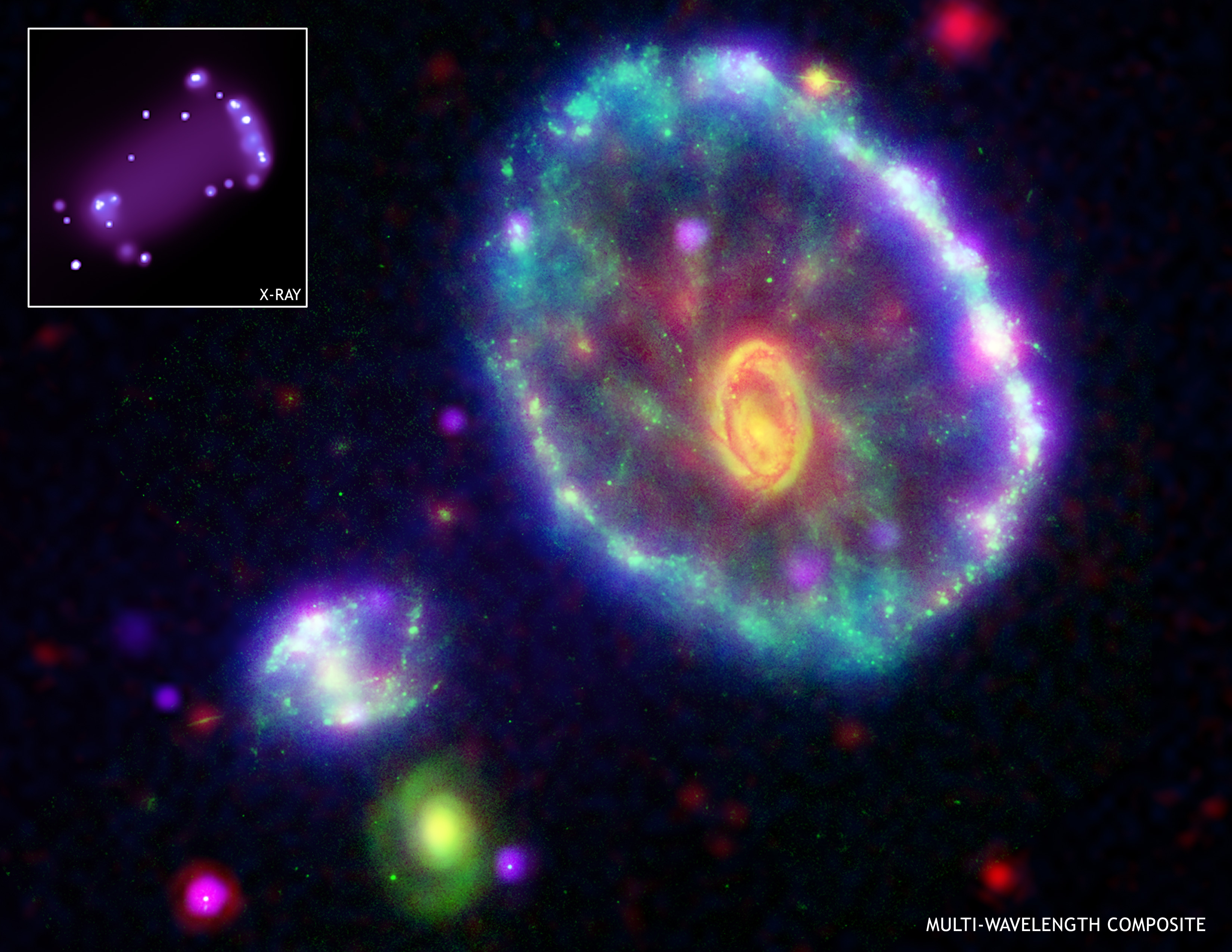
This image combines data from four different observatories: the Chandra X-ray Observatory (purple); the Galaxy Evolution Explorer satellite (ultraviolet/blue); the Hubble Space Telescope (visible/green); the Spitzer Space Telescope (infrared/red). Image is 160 arcsec across. RA 0^{h} 37^{m} 41.10^{s} Dec −33° 42' 58.80" in Sculptor. Color code: Ultraviolet (blue), Optical (green), X-ray (purple), Infrared (red).

The unusual shape of the Cartwheel Galaxy may be due to a collision with a smaller galaxy such as those in the lower left of the image. The most recent star burst (star formation due to compression waves) has lit up the Cartwheel rim, which has a diameter larger than the Milky Way. There is an exceptionally large number of black holes in the rim of the galaxy as can be seen in the inset.

=== Serpens ===
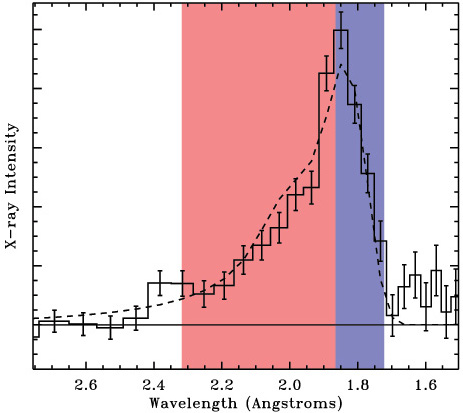
XMM-Newton spectrum from superheated iron atoms at the inner edge of the accretion disk orbiting the neutron star in Serpens X-1. The line is usually a symmetrical peak, but it exhibits the classic features of distortion due to relativistic effects. The extremely fast motion of the iron-rich gas causes the line to spread out. The entire line has been shifted to longer wavelengths (left, red) because of the neutron star's powerful gravity. The line is brighter toward shorter wavelengths (right, blue) because Einstein's special theory of relativity predicts that a high-speed source beamed toward Earth will appear brighter than the same source moving away from Earth.

As of 27 August 2007, discoveries concerning asymmetric iron line broadening and their implications for relativity have been a topic of much excitement. With respect to the asymmetric iron line broadening, Edward Cackett of the University of Michigan commented, "We're seeing the gas whipping around just outside the neutron star's surface,". "And since the inner part of the disk obviously can't orbit any closer than the neutron star's surface, these measurements give us a maximum size of the neutron star's diameter. The neutron stars can be no larger than 18 to 20.5 miles across, results that agree with other types of measurements."

"We've seen these asymmetric lines from many black holes, but this is the first confirmation that neutron stars can produce them as well. It shows that the way neutron stars accrete matter is not very different from that of black holes, and it gives us a new tool to probe Einstein's theory", says Tod Strohmayer of NASA's Goddard Space Flight Center.

"This is fundamental physics", says Sudip Bhattacharyya also of NASA's Goddard Space Flight Center in Greenbelt, Maryland, and the University of Maryland. "There could be exotic kinds of particles or states of matter, such as quark matter, in the centers of neutron stars, but it's impossible to create them in the lab. The only way to find out is to understand neutron stars."

Using XMM-Newton, Bhattacharyya and Strohmayer observed Serpens X-1, which contains a neutron star and a stellar companion. Cackett and Jon Miller of the University of Michigan, along with Bhattacharyya and Strohmayer, used Suzaku's superb spectral capabilities to survey Serpens X-1. The Suzaku data confirmed the XMM-Newton result regarding the iron line in Serpens X-1.

=== Ursa Major ===
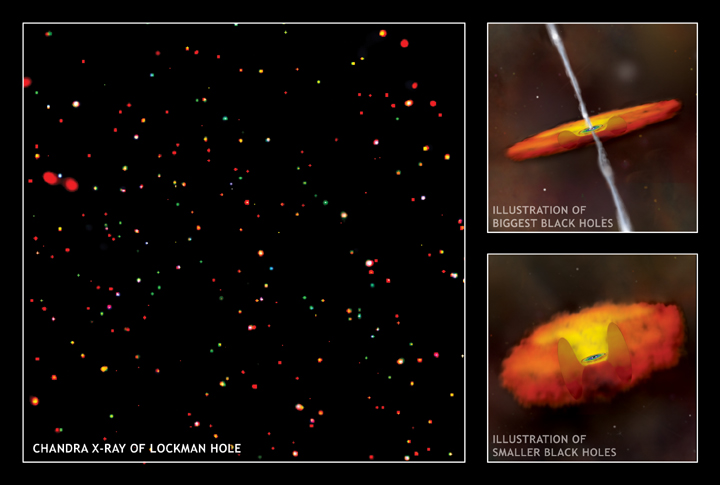
Chandra mosaic of the X-ray sources in the Lockman Hole. Color code: Energy (red 0.4-2keV, green 2-8keV, blue 4-8keV). Image is about 50 arcmin per side.

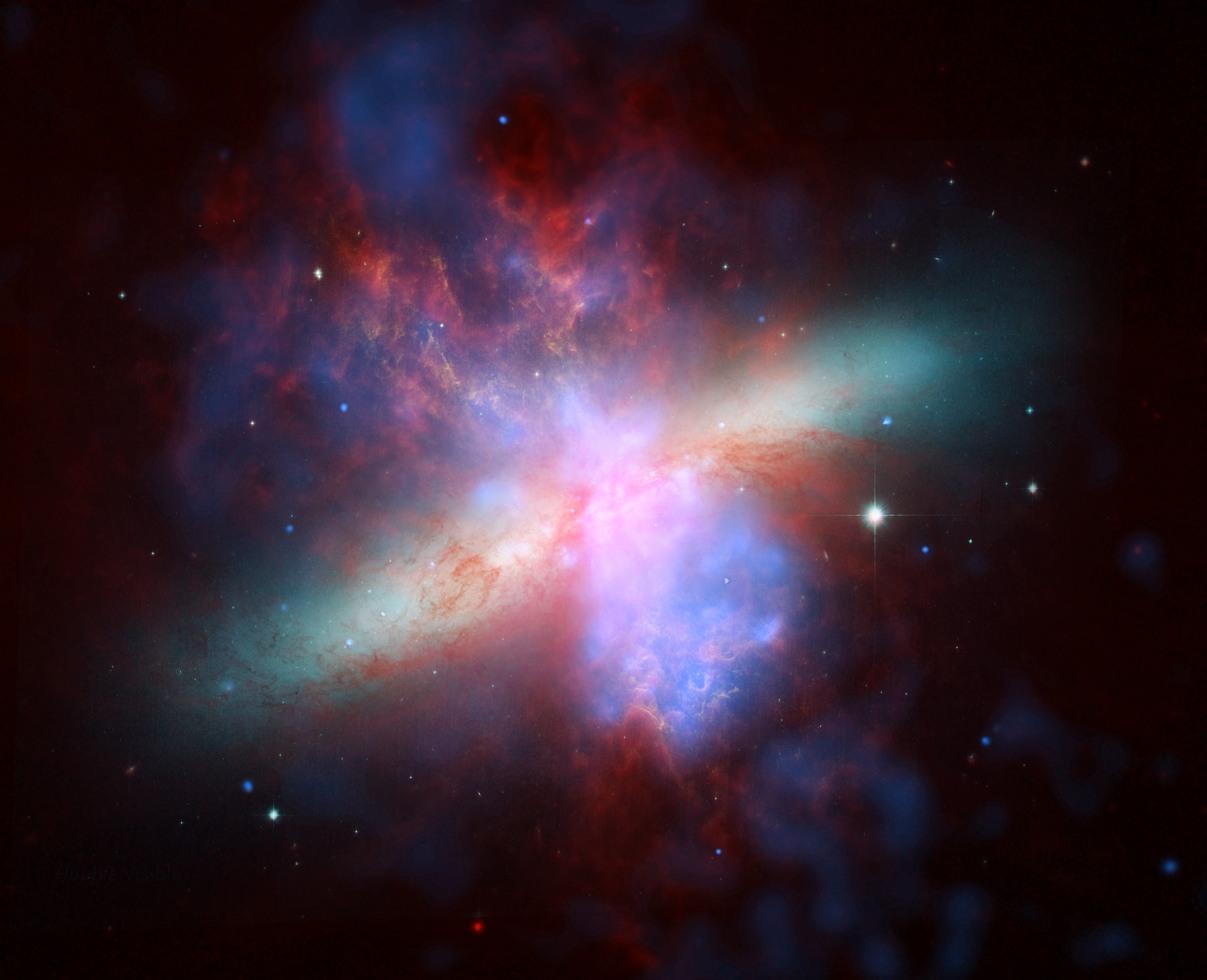
A combined Hubble/Spitzer/Chandra image of M 82.

M82 X-1 is in the constellation Ursa Major at 09^{h} 55^{m} 50.01^{s} +69° 40′ 46.0″. It was detected in January 2006 by the Rossi X-ray Timing Explorer.

In Ursa Major at RA 10^{h} 34^{m} 00.00 Dec +57° 40' 00.00" is a field of view that is almost free of absorption by neutral hydrogen gas within the Milky Way. It is known as the Lockman Hole. Hundreds of X-ray sources from other galaxies, some of them supermassive black holes, can be seen through this window.

== Exotic X-ray sources ==
=== Microquasar ===
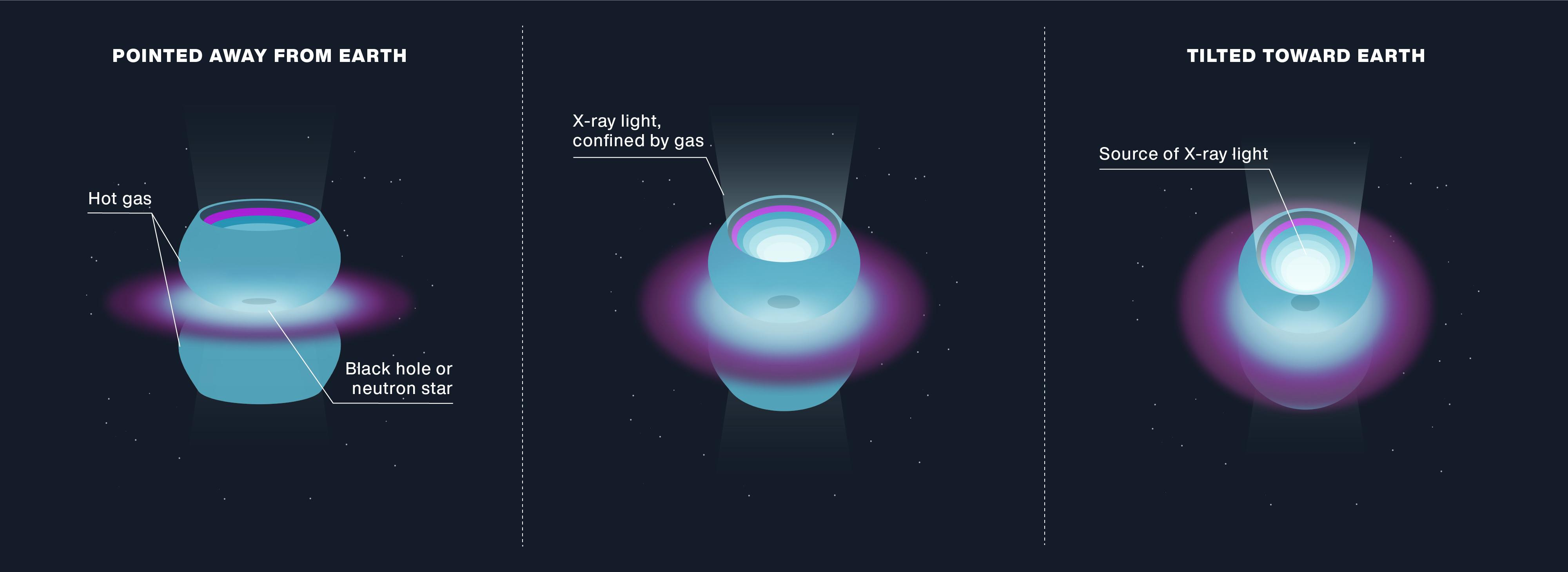
SS 433 - possible ULX ray source

A microquasar is a smaller cousin of a quasar that is a radio emitting X-ray binary, with an often resolvable pair of radio jets. SS 433 is one of the most exotic star systems observed. It is an eclipsing binary with the primary either a black hole or neutron star and the secondary is a late A-type star. SS 433 lies within SNR W50. The material in the jet traveling from the secondary to the primary does so at 26% of light speed. The spectrum of SS 433 is affected by Doppler shifts and by relativity: when the effects of the Doppler shift are subtracted, there is a residual redshift which corresponds to a velocity of about 12,000 kps. This does not represent an actual velocity of the system away from the Earth; rather, it is due to time dilation, which makes moving clocks appear to stationary observers to be ticking more slowly. In this case, the relativistically moving excited atoms in the jets appear to vibrate more slowly and their radiation thus appears red-shifted.

=== Be X-ray binaries ===
LSI+61°303 is a periodic, radio-emitting binary system that is also the gamma-ray source, CG135+01. LSI+61°303 is a variable radio source characterized by periodic, non-thermal radio outbursts with a period of 26.5 d, attributed to the eccentric orbital motion of a compact object, probably a neutron star, around a rapidly rotating B0 Ve star, with a T_{eff} ~26,000 K and luminosity of ~10^{38} erg s^{−1}. Photometric observations at optical and infrared wavelengths also show a 26.5 d modulation. Of the 20 or so members of the Be X-ray binary systems, as of 1996, only X Per and LSI+61°303 have X-ray outbursts of much higher luminosity and harder spectrum (kT ~ 10–20 keV) vs. (kT ≤ 1 keV); however, LSI+61°303 further distinguishes itself by its strong, outbursting radio emission. "The radio properties of LSI+61°303 are similar to those of the "standard" high-mass X-ray binaries such as SS 433, Cyg X-3 and Cir X-1."

=== Supergiant fast X-ray transients (SFXTs) ===
There are a growing number of recurrent X-ray transients, characterized by short outbursts with very fast rise times (tens of minutes) and typical durations of a few hours that are associated with OB supergiants and hence define a new class of massive X-ray binaries: Supergiant Fast X-ray Transients (SFXTs). XTE J1739–302 is one of these. Discovered in 1997, remaining active only one day, with an X-ray spectrum well fitted with a thermal bremsstrahlung (temperature of ~20 keV), resembling the spectral properties of accreting pulsars, it was at first classified as a peculiar Be/X-ray transient with an unusually short outburst. A new burst was observed on 8 April 2008 with Swift.

=== Messier 87 ===
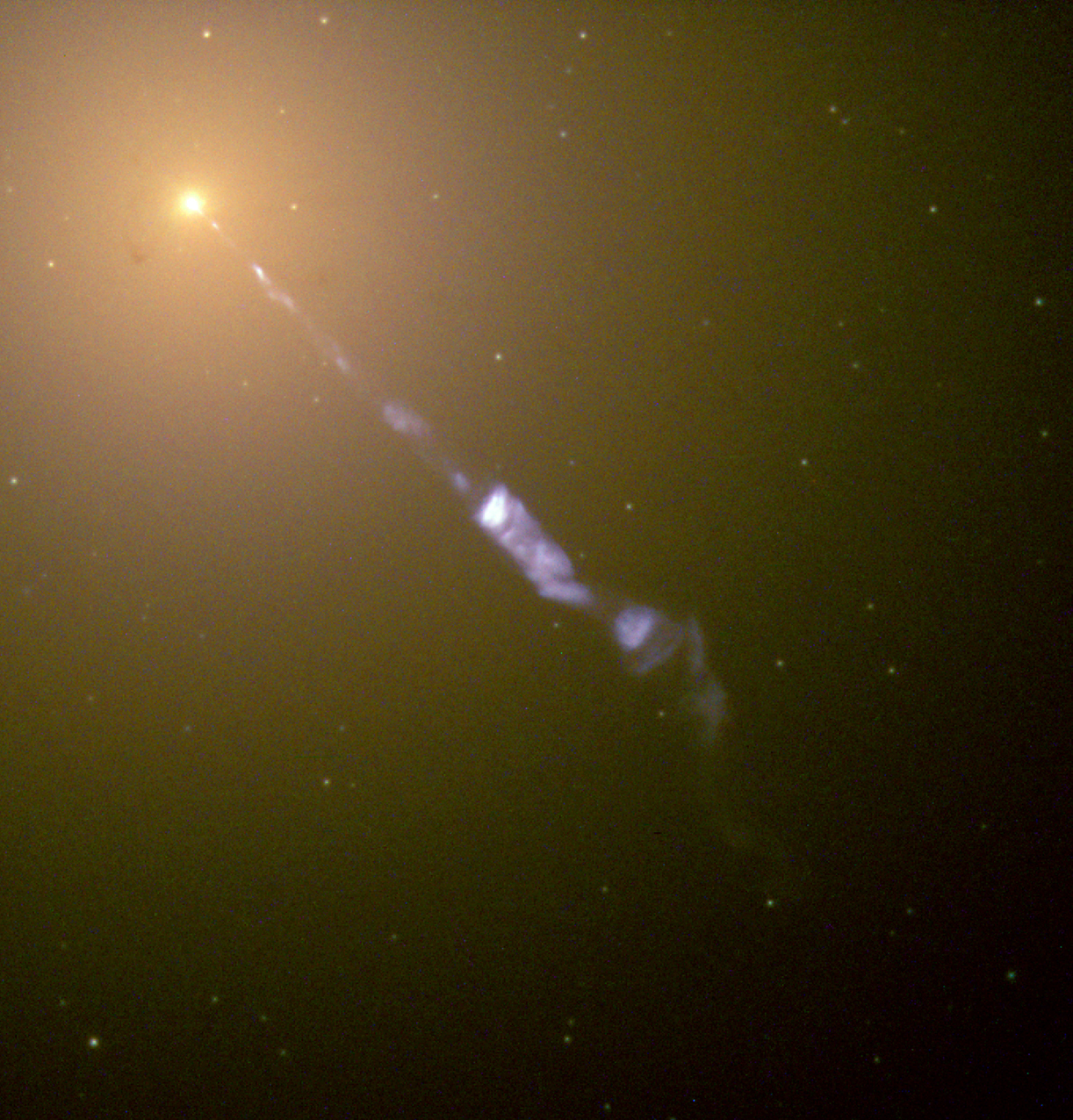
A 5,000 ly jet of matter ejected from M87 at near lightspeed.

Observations made by Chandra indicate the presence of loops and rings in the hot X-ray emitting gas that surrounds Messier 87. These loops and rings are generated by variations in the rate at which material is ejected from the supermassive black hole in jets. The distribution of loops suggests that minor eruptions occur every six million years.

One of the rings, caused by a major eruption, is a shock wave 85,000 light-years in diameter around the black hole. Other remarkable features observed include narrow X-ray emitting filaments up to 100,000 light-years long, and a large cavity in the hot gas caused by a major eruption 70 million years ago.

The galaxy also contains a notable active galactic nucleus (AGN) that is a strong source of multiwavelength radiation, particularly radio waves.

=== Magnetars ===
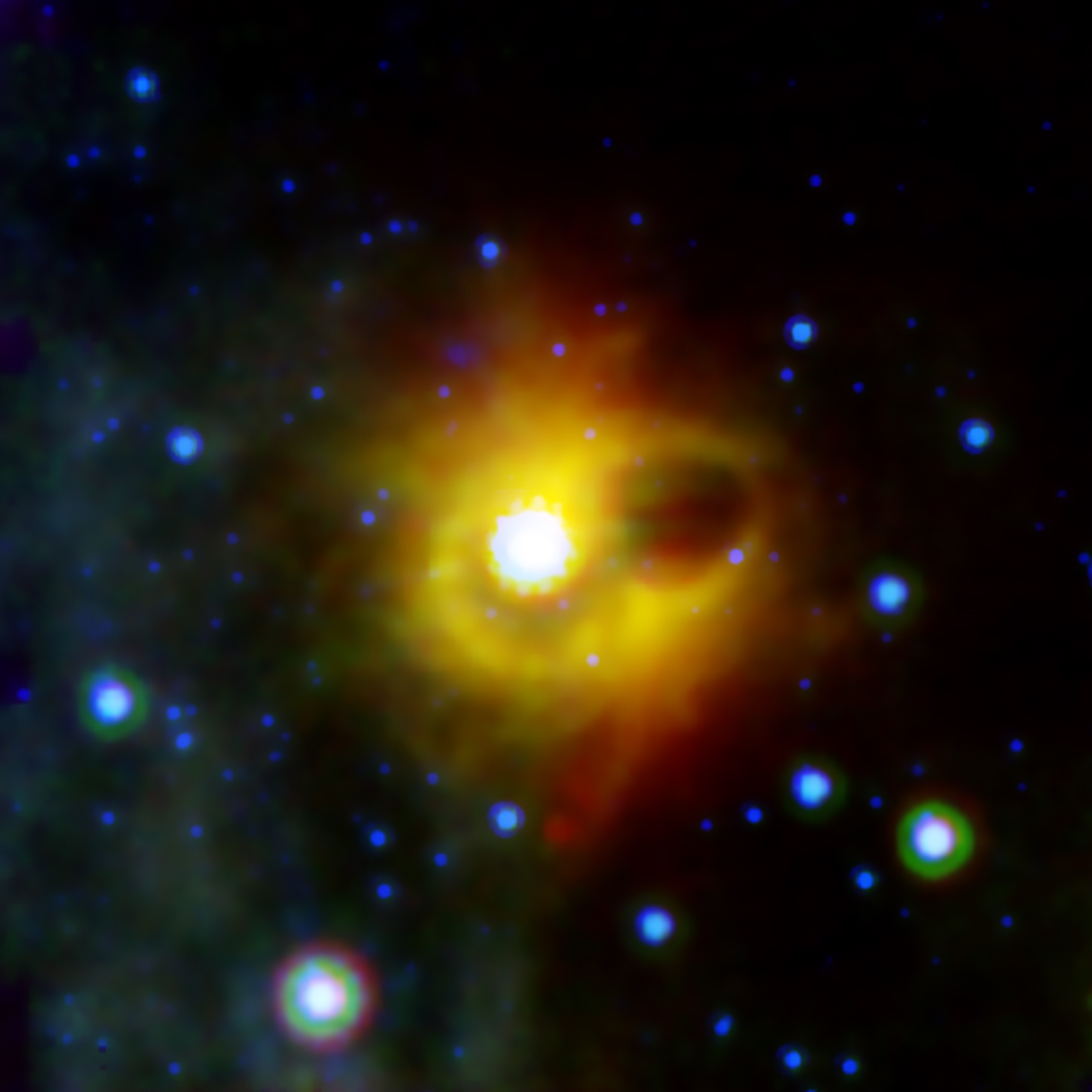
Magnetar SGR 1900+14 is in the exact center of the image, which shows a surrounding ring of gas 7 ly across in infrared light, as seen by the Spitzer Space Telescope. The magnetar itself is not visible at this wavelength, but it has been seen in X-ray light.

A magnetar is a type of neutron star with an extremely powerful magnetic field, the decay of which powers the emission of copious amounts of high-energy electromagnetic radiation, particularly X-rays and gamma rays. The theory regarding these objects was proposed by Robert Duncan and Christopher Thompson in 1992, but the first recorded burst of gamma rays thought to have been from a magnetar was on 5 March 1979. These magnetic fields are hundreds of thousands of times stronger than any man-made magnet, and quadrillions of times more powerful than the field surrounding Earth. As of 2003, they are the most magnetic objects ever detected in the universe.

On 5 March 1979, after dropping probes into the atmosphere of Venus, Venera 11 and Venera 12, while in heliocentric orbits, were hit at 10:51 am EST by a blast of gamma ray radiation. This contact raised the radiation readings on both the probes Konus experiments from a normal 100 counts per second to over 200,000 counts a second, in only a fraction of a millisecond. This giant flare was detected by numerous spacecraft and with these detections was localized by the interplanetary network to SGR 0526-66 inside the N-49 SNR of the Large Magellanic Cloud. And, Konus detected another source in March 1979: SGR 1900+14, located 20,000 light-years away in the constellation Aquila had a long period of low emissions, except the significant burst in 1979, and a couple after.

What is the evolutionary relationship between pulsars and magnetars? Astronomers would like to know if magnetars represent a rare class of pulsars, or if some or all pulsars go through a magnetar phase during their life cycles. NASA's Rossi X-ray Timing Explorer (RXTE) has revealed that the youngest known pulsing neutron star has thrown a temper tantrum. The collapsed star occasionally unleashes powerful bursts of X-rays, which are forcing astronomers to rethink the life cycle of neutron stars.

"We are watching one type of neutron star literally change into another right before our very eyes. This is a long-sought missing link between different types of pulsars", says Fotis Gavriil of NASA's Goddard Space Flight Center in Greenbelt, Maryland, and the University of Maryland, Baltimore.

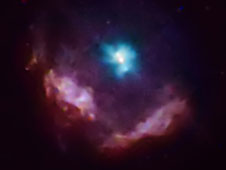
Chandra image shows the supernova Kes 75 with the young, normal pulsar, neutron star PSR J1846-0258 in the center of the blue area at the top.

PSR J1846-0258 is in the constellation Aquila. It had been classed as a normal pulsar because of its fast spin (3.1 s^{−1}) and pulsar-like spectrum. RXTE caught four magnetar-like X-ray bursts on 31 May 2006, and another on 27 July 2006. Although none of these events lasted longer than 0.14-second, they all packed the wallop of at least 75,000 Suns. "Never before has a regular pulsar been observed to produce magnetar bursts", says Gavriil.

"Young, fast-spinning pulsars were not thought to have enough magnetic energy to generate such powerful bursts", says Marjorie Gonzalez, formerly of McGill University in Montreal, Canada, now based at the University of British Columbia in Vancouver. "Here's a normal pulsar that's acting like a magnetar."

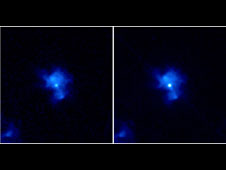
These Chandra images show PSR J1846-0258 in Kes 75 in October 2000 (left) and June 2006 (right). The pulsar brightened in X-rays after giving off powerful outbursts earlier in 2006.

The observations from NASA's Chandra X-ray Observatory showed that the object had brightened in X-rays, confirming that the bursts were from the pulsar, and that its spectrum had changed to become more magnetar-like. The fact that PSR J1846's spin rate is decelerating also means that it has a strong magnetic field braking the rotation. The implied magnetic field is trillions of times stronger than Earth's field, but it's 10 to 100 times weaker than a typical magnetar. Victoria Kaspi of McGill University notes, "PSR J1846's actual magnetic field could be much stronger than the measured amount, suggesting that many young neutron stars classified as pulsars might actually be magnetars in disguise, and that the true strength of their magnetic field only reveals itself over thousands of years as they ramp up in activity."

== X-ray dark stars ==
During the solar cycle, as shown in the sequence of images of the Sun in X-rays, the Sun is almost X-ray dark, almost an X-ray variable. Betelgeuse, on the other hand, appears to be always X-ray dark. The X-ray flux from the entire stellar surface corresponds to a surface flux limit that ranges from 30–7000 ergs s^{−1} cm^{−2} at T=1 MK, to ~1 erg s^{−1} cm^{−2} at higher temperatures, five orders of magnitude below the quiet Sun X-ray surface flux.

Like the red supergiant Betelgeuse, red giants emit hardly any X-rays. The cause of the X-ray deficiency may involve

- a turn-off of the dynamo,
- a suppression by competing wind production, or
- strong attenuation by an overlying thick chromosphere.

Prominent bright red giants include Aldebaran, Arcturus, and Gamma Crucis. There is an apparent X-ray "dividing line" in the H-R diagram among the giant stars as they cross from the main sequence to become red giants. Alpha Trianguli Australis (α TrA / α Trianguli Australis) appears to be a Hybrid star (parts of both sides) in the "Dividing Line" of evolutionary transition to red giant. α TrA can serve to test the several Dividing Line models.

There is also a rather abrupt onset of X-ray emission around spectral type A7-F0, with a large range of luminosities developing across spectral class F.

In the few genuine late A- or early F-type coronal emitters, their weak dynamo operation is generally not able to brake the rapidly spinning star considerably during their short lifetime so that these coronae are conspicuous by their severe deficit of X-ray emission compared to chromospheric and transition region fluxes; the latter can be followed up to mid-A type stars at quite high levels. Whether or not these atmospheres are indeed heated acoustically and drive an "expanding", weak and cool corona or whether they are heated magnetically, the X-ray deficit and the low coronal temperatures clearly attest to the inability of these stars to maintain substantial, hot coronae in any way comparable to cooler active stars, their appreciable chromospheres notwithstanding.

== X-ray interstellar medium ==
The Hot Ionized Medium (HIM), sometimes consisting of Coronal gas, in the temperature range from 1 to 10 million K emits X-rays. Stellar winds from young clusters of stars (often with giant or supergiant HII regions surrounding them) and shock waves created by supernovae inject enormous amounts of energy into their surroundings, which leads to hypersonic turbulence. The resultant structures – of varying sizes – can be observed, such as stellar wind bubbles and superbubbles of hot gas, by X-ray satellite telescopes. The Sun is currently traveling through the Local Interstellar Cloud, a denser region in the low-density Local Bubble.

== Diffuse X-ray background ==
In addition to discrete sources which stand out against the sky, there is good evidence for a diffuse X-ray background. During more than a decade of observations of X-ray emission from the Sun, evidence of the existence of an isotropic X-ray background flux was obtained in 1956. This background flux is rather consistently observed over a wide range of energies. The early high-energy end of the spectrum for this diffuse X-ray background was obtained by instruments on board Ranger 3 and Ranger 5. The X-ray flux corresponds to a total energy density of about 5 × 10^{−4} eV/cm^{3}. The ROSAT soft X-ray diffuse background (SXRB) image shows the general increase in intensity from the Galactic plane to the poles. At the lowest energies, 0.1 – 0.3 keV, nearly all of the observed soft X-ray background (SXRB) is thermal emission from ~1 million K plasma.

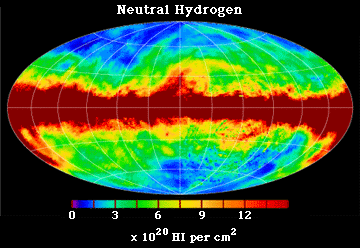
Map of the column density of Galactic neutral hydrogen in the same projection as the 0.25 keV SXRB. Note the general negative correlation between the 0.25 keV diffuse X-ray background and the neutral hydrogen column density shown here.

By comparing the soft X-ray background with the distribution of neutral hydrogen, it is generally agreed that within the Milky Way disk, super soft X-rays are absorbed by this neutral hydrogen.

== X-ray dark planets ==
X-ray observations offer the possibility to detect (X-ray dark) planets as they eclipse part of the corona of their parent star while in transit. "Such methods are particularly promising for low-mass stars as a Jupiter-like planet could eclipse a rather significant coronal area."

=== Earth ===
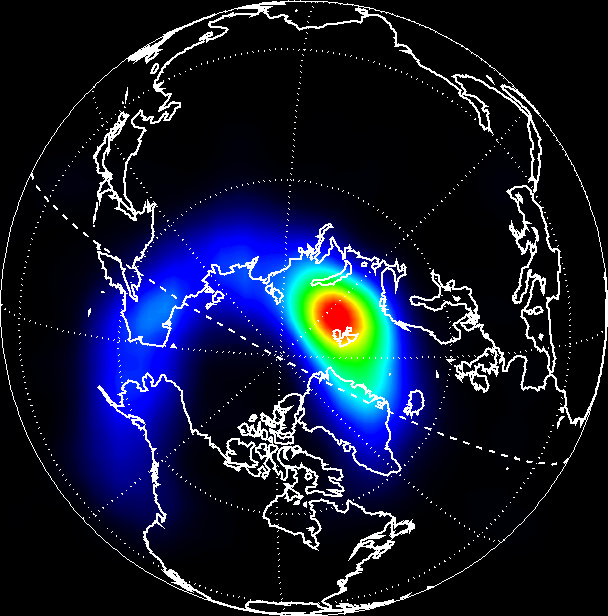
This composite image contains the first picture of the Earth in X-rays, taken in March 1996, with the orbiting Polar satellite. The area of brightest X-ray emission is red. Such X-rays are not dangerous because they are absorbed by lower parts of the Earth's atmosphere.

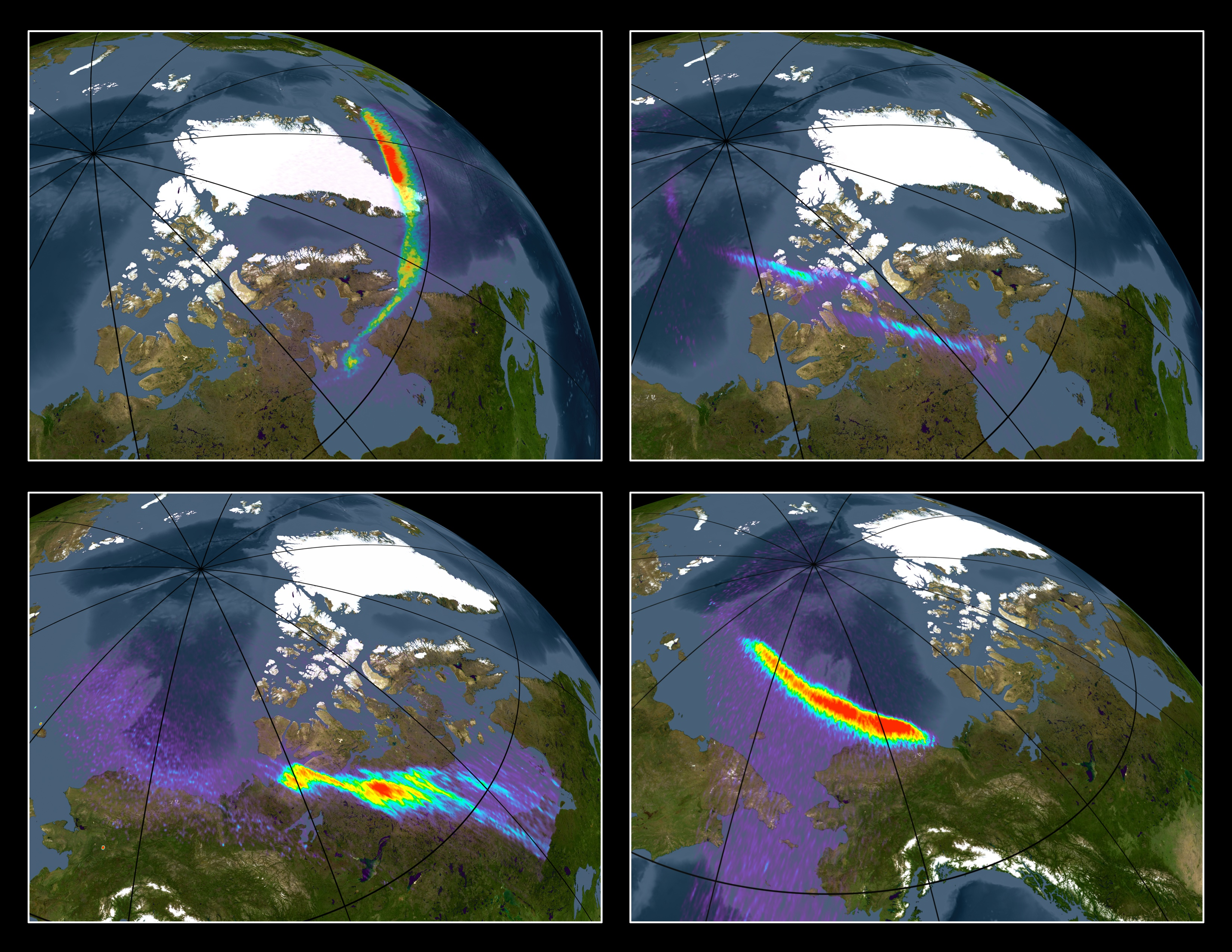
In this sample of images from 2004, bright X-ray arcs of low energy (0.1 – 10 keV) are generated during auroral activity. The images are superimposed on a simulated image of Earth. The color code of the X-ray arcs represent brightness, with maximum brightness shown in red. Distance from the North pole to the black circle is 3,340 km (2,080 mi). Observation dates: 10 pointings between 16 December 2003 – 13 April 2004. Instrument: HRC.

The first picture of the Earth in X-rays was taken in March 1996, with the orbiting Polar satellite. Energetically charged particles from the Sun cause aurora and energize electrons in the Earth's magnetosphere. These electrons move along the Earth's magnetic field and eventually strike the Earth's ionosphere, producing the X-ray emission.

== See also ==
- Astronomical radio source
