= Lockman Hole =

Area of the sky with minimal amounts of neutral hydrogen

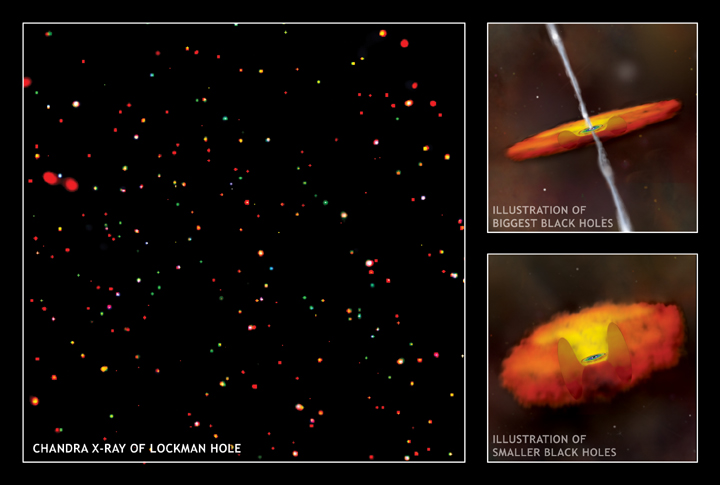
Chandra X-ray Observatory mosaic of the X-ray sources in the Lockman Hole. Color code: Energy (red 0.4–2.0 keV, green 2–8 keV, blue 4–8 keV). Image is about 50 arcmin per side. Credit: X-ray: NASA/CXC/U. Wisconsin/A.Barger et al.; Illustrations: NASA/CXC/M.Weiss.

The Lockman Hole, or The Lockman Window, is an area of the sky in which minimal amounts of neutral hydrogen gas are observed from the perspective of Earth. The Lockman Hole is a relatively clear window on distant objects, which makes it an attractive area of the sky for observational astronomy surveys. It is located near the pointer stars of the Big Dipper in the constellation Ursa Major and is ~15 square degrees in size.

The Lockman Hole is named after its discoverer, astronomer Jay Lockman.

== Location ==
The Lockman Hole is located at about RA 10h 45m, Dec. +58° and is defined by a region of low neutral hydrogen gas and dust column density. Column density is a commonly used measure in astronomy for the quantity of a given chemical element or molecule in a certain direction. In this region, the typical column density of neutral hydrogen is N_{H} = 0.6 × 10^{20} cm^{−2}. This column density is moderately lower than typical values near the galactic poles, where N_{H} $\sim$ 10^{20} cm^{−2}, and H I column densities of N_{H} > 10^{21} cm^{−2} are common at low galactic latitudes and towards H I clouds.

The region around B1950.0 RA 10^{h} 45^{m} Dec 57° 20′ has a minimum N_{H} of 4.5 × 10^{19} cm^{−2}. There is a diffuse cloud covering half of the field.

The Lockman Hole East is a subregion of the Lockman Hole centered at J2000.0 RA 10^{h} 52^{m} Dec +57°.

The Lockman Hole North-west (LHNW) is a region that appears about as wide as the moon centered at J2000.0 RA 10^{h} 34^{m} Dec +57° 40′., with a column density of N_{H} = 5.72 × 10^{19} cm^{−2}.

== Hydrogen gas absorption and emission ==
Clouds of neutral hydrogen are ubiquitous in the Milky Way galaxy, and effectively absorb photons that are energetic enough to ionize hydrogen, which requires an energy of 13.6 electron volts (in the extreme ultraviolet range). Even the relatively small amounts of hydrogen in the Lockman Hole absorb most radiation at and just above energies of 13.6 electron volts, but even so it transmits extreme ultraviolet and soft x-ray radiation from extragalactic objects to a greater degree than other areas of the sky.

Neutral hydrogen is also associated with diffuse emission at infrared wavelengths that can confuse observations of faint infrared sources.

== Observations ==
The relatively clear field of view offered by the Lockman Hole has allowed its use to view extremely distant regions of the universe. Observations by the Spectral and Photometric Imaging Receiver (SPIRE) instrument aboard the Herschel Space Telescope of the Lockman Hole have imaged thousands of extremely distant galaxies that appear as they did 10–12 billion years ago.

This field of view also contains hundreds of astronomical X-ray sources, some of them supermassive black holes. The Chandra X-ray Observatory and ROSAT have been used to study X-ray sources from the Lockman Hole. Some 75 X-ray sources are observed with the PSPC of ROSAT.

Detailed X-ray spectral analysis has been performed on 123 X-ray sources in the Lockman Hole using XMM-Newton.

The diffuse X-ray background (XRB) has also been studied in the area.

Active galactic nuclei have also been studied in the area, for example MBC2005.

== See also ==
- Chandra Deep Field South - a similar clear field-of-view
- Interstellar medium
- Local Bubble
- Local Interstellar Cloud
