= Loughman =

Loughman is a surname. Notable people with the surname include:

- Frank Loughman (1892–1972), Irish Fianna Fáil politician
- George W. Loughman (1846–1909), American politician, mayor of South Bend, Indiana
- Jane Loughman, British film producer and wife of British-born Canadian actor, David Hewlett
- Monica Loughman, Irish prima ballerina
- Sean Loughman or Jack Lukeman (born 1973), Irish singer/songwriter
- Tom Loughman, American politician

== See also ==
- Lockman
