= 3C 295 =

Galaxy in the constellation Boötes

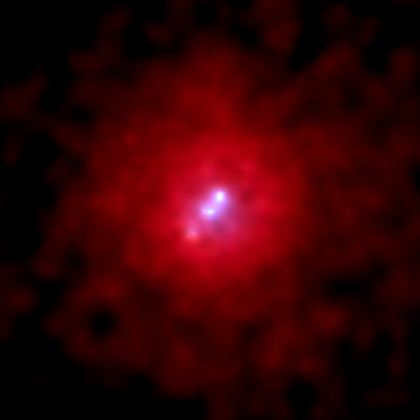
- 3C 295 by Chandra X-Ray Observatory Credit: NASA/CXC/SAO

Observation data (J2000 epoch)
- Constellation: Boötes
- Right ascension: 14^{h} 11^{m} 20.6^{s}
- Declination: +52° 12′ 09″
- Redshift: 0.461687±0.000049
- Heliocentric radial velocity: 138,410±15 km/s
- Galactocentric velocity: 138,528±15 km/s
- Distance: 6,677 ± 467.4 Mly (2,047.1 ± 143.3 Mpc)h^{−1}_{0.6774} (Comoving); 4.910 Gly (1.505 Gpc)h^{−1}_{0.6774} (Light-travel)
- Apparent magnitude (V): 20.80
- Apparent magnitude (B): 22.34
- magnitude (J): 15.193±0.196
- magnitude (H): 14.811±0.223
- magnitude (K): 13.637±0.183

Characteristics
- Type: E/S0; LEG; BrClG NLRG or FRII RG
- Size: 371,590 ly × 312,130 ly (113.93 kpc × 95.70 kpc) (diameter; 25.0 B-mag arcsec^{−2}) (Note: The quoted diameter in this infobox was based on NED's provided scale "Virgo + GA + Shapley" of 9.925 kpc/arcsec multiplied with given angular diameters.); 738,030 ly × 738,030 ly (226.28 kpc × 226.28 kpc) (diameter; "total" magnitude)
- Apparent size (V): 0.157′ × 0.157′

Other designations
- DA 360, 3C 295, 4C 52.30, QSO B1409+524, PGC 2817657

3C 295 is a narrow-line radio galaxy located in the constellation of Boötes. With a redshift of approximately 0.46, it is approximately 2.05 gigaparsecs (6.7 billion light-years) from Earth. At time of the discovery of its redshift in 1960, this was the most remote object known.

== History ==
The number in its name corresponds with it being the 295th object in the Third Cambridge Catalogue of Radio Sources (which are ordered by right ascension). This is also where the prefix 3C came from.

The radio galaxy itself is a fairly normal small radio galaxy although unusually its hotspots are readily detected in optical and X-ray emission. The X-ray emission from the source is dominated by thermal emission from a rich cluster of galaxies. In optical images about 100 galaxies can be seen. 3C 295's cluster has enough material to create another 1,000 galaxies or more, making it one of the most massive objects in the known Universe. However, X-ray data showed that there is not enough mass to hold 3C 295 together gravitationally, which suggests the presence of dark matter.
