= Jay Lockman =

American radio astronomy researcher

Felix James "Jay" Lockman is an American astronomer and Principal Scientist and former director of the Green Bank Telescope. He is the discoverer of the eponymous Lockman Hole.

Lockman is also a prize-winning banjo player, and also plays a number of other instruments including fiddle and piano.
