= Diiodide =

Diiodide may refer to:

- Titanium diiodide, TiI_{2}
- Vanadium diiodide, VI_{2}
- Chromium diiodide, CrI_{2}
- Iron diiodide, FeI_{2}
- Cobalt diiodide, CoI_{2}
- Nickel diiodide, NiI_{2}
- Germanium diiodide, GeI_{2}
- Molybdenum diiodide, MoI_{2}
- Palladium diiodide, PdI_{2}
- Tin diiodide, SnI_{2}
- Lanthanum diiodide, LaI_{2}
- Cerium diiodide, CeI_{2}
- Praseodymium diiodide, PrI_{2}
- Neodymium diiodide, NdI_{2}
- Samarium diiodide, SmI_{2}
- Europium diiodide, EuI_{2}
- Gadolinium diiodide, GdI_{2}
- Dysprosium diiodide, DyI_{2}
- Thulium diiodide, TmI_{2}
- Ytterbium diiodide, YbI_{2}
- Tungsten diiodide, WI_{2}
- Osmium diiodide, OsI_{2}
- Mercury diiodide, HgI_{2}
- Lead diiodide, PbI_{2}
- Thorium diiodide, ThI_{2}
- Americium diiodide, AmI_{2}
- Californium diiodide, CfI_{2}
