= Thorium iodide =

Thorium iodide may refer to:

- Thorium(II) iodide (thorium diiodide), ThI_{2}
- Thorium(III) iodide (thorium triiodide), ThI_{3}
- Thorium(IV) iodide (thorium tetraiodide), ThI_{4}
