= Thorium diiodide =

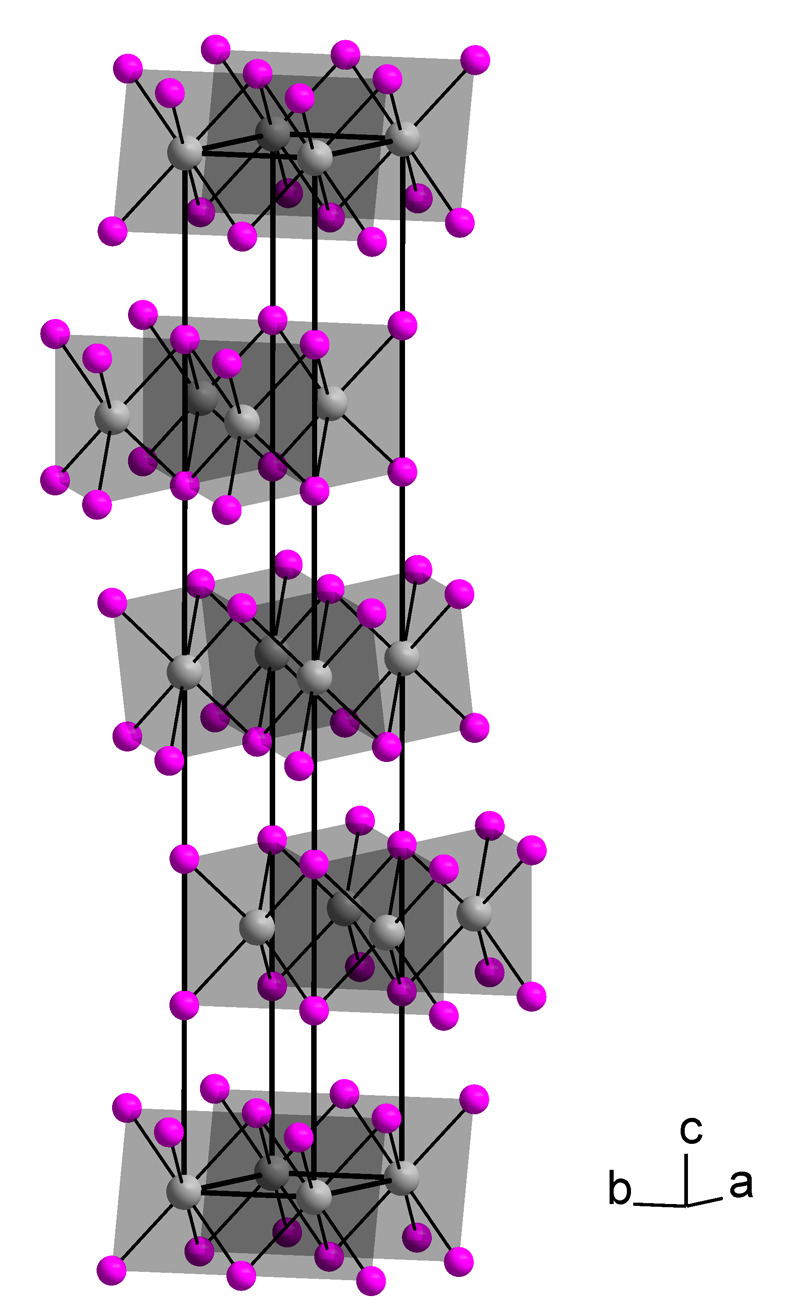

Identifiers
CAS Number	13779-95-8
3D model (JSmol)	Interactive image
PubChem CID	21115822
- InChI: InChI=1S/2HI.Th/h2*1H;/q;;+2/p-2 Key: WASWCTHKYRRDNN-UHFFFAOYSA-L
- SMILES: [Th+2].[I-].[I-]

Properties
Chemical formula	ThI_{2}
Molar mass	612.75
Appearance	golden metallic
Density	7.21 g/cm^{3}
Melting point	850 °C
Solubility in water	soluble

Structure
Crystal structure	hexagonal

Hazards
- Occupational safety and health (OHS/OSH)
Main hazards	Radioactive

Related compounds
Other cations	Cerium diiodide Praseodymium diiodide Gadolinium diiodide
Related compounds	Thorium triiodide Thorium tetraiodide
- Except where otherwise noted, data are given for materials in their standard state (at 25 °C [77 °F], 100 kPa). Infobox references

Thorium diiodide is an iodide of thorium, with the chemical formula of ThI_{2}. It is an electride with the ionic formula Th^{4+}(I^{−})_{2}e^{−}_{2}. It is air-sensitive.

== Preparation ==
Thorium diiodide cn be prepared by heating thorium tetraiodide in stoichiometric amounts of thorium:

ThI_{4} + Th → 2 ThI_{2}

It can also be prepared by directly reacting thorium and iodine:

Th + I_{2} → ThI_{2}

Thorium diiodide can also be prepared from the decomposition of thorium triiodide at temperatures above 550 °C:

2 ThI_{3} → ThI_{4} + ThI_{2}

== Properties ==
Like the diiodides of cerium, praseodymium and gadolinium, it has a metallic gold lustre and high electrical conductivity.
