= Anthony Barrett =

British chemist (born 1952)

Anthony Gerard Martin Barrett FRS FMedSci
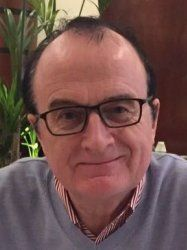
- Born: 2 March 1952 (age 74); England, U.K
- Education: Imperial College London
- Scientific career
- Workplaces: Northwestern University, Colorado State University, Imperial College London
- Doctoral advisor: Derek Barton
- Doctoral students: Matthew Fuchter
- Website: www.imperial.ac.uk/people/agm.barrett

Anthony Gerard Martin Barrett is a British chemist, and Sir Derek Barton Professor of Synthesis, Glaxo Professor of Organic Chemistry at Imperial College London. He is Director of the Wolfson Centre for Organic Chemistry in Medical Science. He was elected a fellow of the Royal Society in 1999 and Academy of Medical Sciences in 2003. He obtained a BSc as well as PhD from Imperial College London in 1973 and 1975 respectively.

== Education ==
Barrett was educated at Hele's Grammar School in Exeter. He attended Imperial College, London (1st Class Honours BSc in 1973 and DIC and PhD in 1975). He carried out his Ph.D. working under the direction of Sir Derek Barton, Nobel Laureate.

== Career and research ==
Barrett was appointed lecturer in organic chemistry (1975) at IC and senior lecturer (1982). In 1983, he was appointed full professor of Chemistry at Northwestern University in Evanston, Illinois, and in 1990 moved to Colorado State University. After ten years research in the US, he returned to IC as Glaxo Professor of Organic Chemistry, Director of the Wolfson Centre for Organic Chemistry in Medical Science and Head of the Organic Section. He was appointed the Sir Derek Barton Professor of Synthetic Chemistry in 1999. Barrett has invented many reactions including novel glycosidations, atom-economic aromatic substitution reactions, metal-catalyzed oxidations and hydroaminations, reactions using ROMP-gel supported reagents and multi-component benzyne coupling reactions. He has contributed extensively to the synthesis of β-lactams using alkenyl anions, ynolates, novel isocyanates, iron vinylidines, heteroatom functionalized nitroalkenes, and ring closing alkene and enyne metathesis reactions. He has completed the total synthesis of diverse bioactive natural products including papulacandin D, papuamine, showdomycin, milbemycin β3, the palmarumycins and preussomerin G, (+)-calyculin A and the multiple cyclopropane CETP inhibitor U-106305 and structurally related cyclopropane nucleoside FR-900848 and coronanes. He has also published highly flexible methods for the biomimetic total syntheses of resorcylate and meroterpenoid natural products including 15G256β, aigialomycin D, LL-Z1640-2, cruentaren A, hericenone J and macrosporin, amorphastilbol, (+)-hongoquercin A and B, and austalides. Barrett, in collaboration with Brian M. Hoffman at Northwestern University, has published pioneering work on the synthesis of diverse porphyrazines bearing 8, 6, 4, and 2 thiols, amines or alcohols as peripheral macrocyclic ring substituents and the conversion of these polydentate ligands by the complexation of metal ions both within the macrocyclic cavity and at the periphery to produce diverse multimetallic complexes. Several such complexes are imaging agents for the highly selective detection of cancers in both cells and in vivo and as PDT agents. Additionally, Barrett in collaboration with Simak Ali and R. Charles Coombes in Medicine at Imperial College and Dennis Liotta and James P. Snyder in Emory University has made pioneering contributions to addressing unmet medical need with the invention of highly selective and bioavailable inhibitors of the Cyclin Dependent Kinases including CDK-7 inhibitor ICEC0942 (CT7001), which have been licensed by Carrick Therapeutics for clinical trials to treat Tamoxifen-resistant and other cancers.
Barrett was the first to demonstrate the increased stability of per-alkylated aza crown ether analogues under dissolving metal reduction conditions. This not only triggered the development of thermally stable solid alkalides and electrides), but also led him and his doctoral student René Riedel, in a multidisciplinary approach and in collaboration with Peter Edwards, to provide compelling experimental evidence for the predominant formation of alkalide ion pairs in solution for the first time.

== Awards and honors ==
Barrett has received numerous awards for his contributions to research from the Royal Society of Chemistry (1980 Meldola Medal, 1982 Harrison Medal , 1986 Corday-Morgan Medal , 1994 Tilden Lectureship, 1996 Award in Synthetic Organic Chemistry, 2001 Award in Natural Products Chemistry, 2004 Pedler Lectureship, 2005 Simonsen Lectureship, 2010 Charles Rees Award), the American Chemical Society (1986 Cope Scholar Award), the Royal Society (2002 Royal Society Wolfson Research Merit Award ), Imperial College (1981 Armstrong Medal), the Camille and Henry Dreyfus Foundation (1987 Teacher Scholar Award ), Glaxo GlaxoSmithKline Wellcome (2000 Award for Innovative Chemistry), Institute of Applied Catalysis (2001 Award for Innovation in Applied Catalysis), and the Specialised Organic Sector Association (2000 Innovation Award). In 2017 he received the Imperial College President's Medal for Excellence in Research: Excellence in Innovation and Entrepreneurship (with Simak Ali, R. Charles Coombes and Matthew Fuchter).
