= Neodymium iodide =

Neodymium iodide may refer to:

- Neodymium(II) iodide (neodymium diiodide), NdI_{2}
- Neodymium(III) iodide (neodymium triiodide), NdI_{3}
