= Lanthanum(III) iodide =

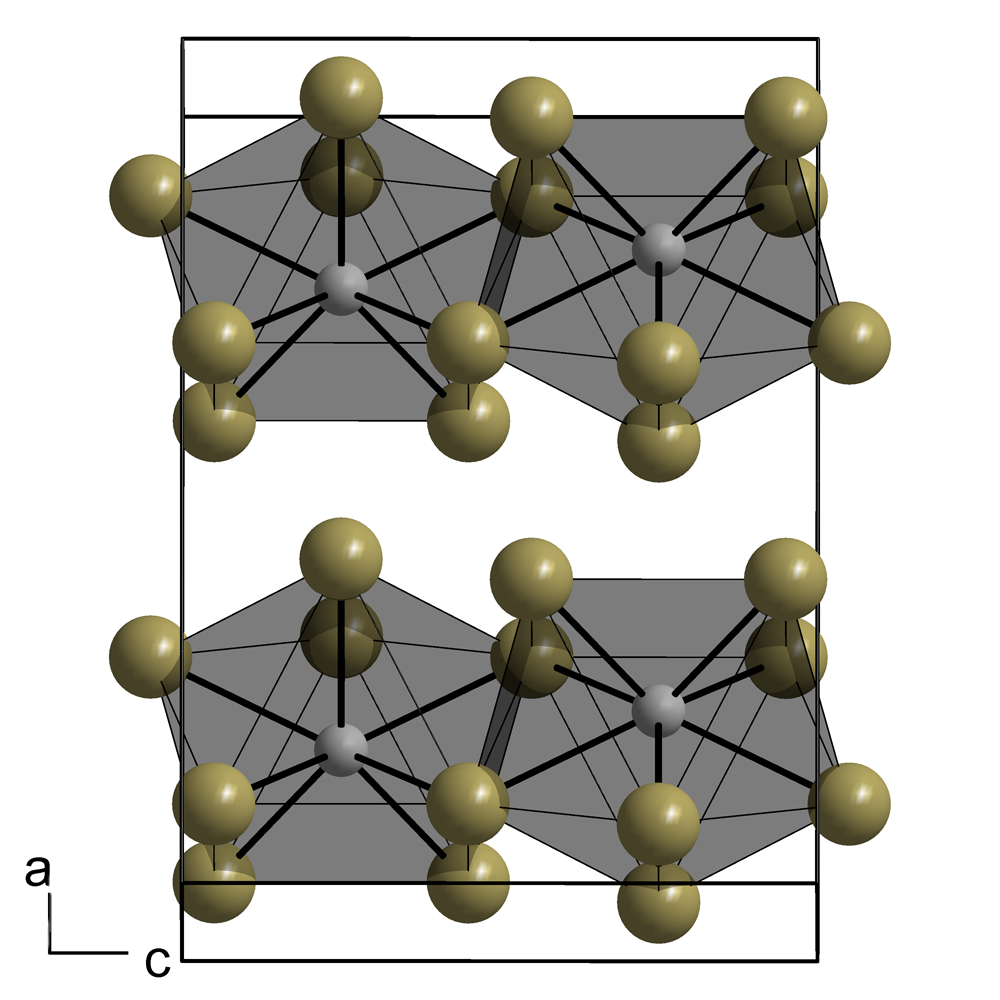

Names
- Other names Lanthanum triiodide

Identifiers
CAS Number	13813-22-4
3D model (JSmol)	Interactive image
ChemSpider	75565
ECHA InfoCard	100.034.045
EC Number	237-465-6
PubChem CID	24870325
CompTox Dashboard (EPA)	DTXSID0065640
- InChI: InChI=1S/3HI.La/h3*1H;/q;;;+3/p-3 Key: KYKBXWMMXCGRBA-UHFFFAOYSA-K
- SMILES: I[La](I)I

Properties
Chemical formula	LaI_{3}
Molar mass	519.62
Density	5.63 g/mL at 25 °C
Melting point	772 °C (1,422 °F; 1,045 K)
- Except where otherwise noted, data are given for materials in their standard state (at 25 °C [77 °F], 100 kPa). Infobox references

Lanthanum(III) iodide is an inorganic compound containing lanthanum and iodine with the chemical formula LaI_{3}.

== Synthesis ==
Lanthanum(III) iodide can be synthesised by the reaction of lanthanum metal with mercury(II) iodide:

2 La + 3 HgI_{2} → 2 LaI_{3} + 3 Hg

It can also be prepared from the elements, that is by the reaction of metallic lanthanum with iodine:

2 La + 3 I_{2} → 2 LaI_{3}

While lanthanum(III) iodide solutions can be generated by dissolving lanthanum oxide in hydroiodic acid, the product will hydrolyse and form polymeric hydroxy species:

La_{2}O_{3} + 6 HI → 2 LaI_{3} + 3 H_{2}O → further reactions

== Structure ==
Lanthanum(III) iodide adopts the same crystal structure as plutonium(III) bromide, with 8-coordinate metal centres arranged in layers. This orthorhombic structure is typical of the triiodides of the lighter lanthanides (La–Nd), whereas heavier lanthanides tend to adopt the hexagonal bismuth(III) iodide structure.

== Reactivity and applications ==
Lanthanum(III) iodide is very soluble in water and is deliquescent. Anhydrous lanthanum(III) iodide reacts with tetrahydrofuran to form a photoluminescent complex, LaI_{3}(THF)_{4}, with an average La–I bond length of 3.16 Å. This complex is a starting material for amide and cyclopentadienyl complexes of lanthanum.

== Related compounds ==
Lanthanum also forms a diiodide, LaI_{2}. It is an electride and is best formulated {La^{III},2I^{−},e^{−}}, with the electron delocalised in a conduction band. Several other lanthanides form similar compounds, including CeI_{2}, PrI_{2} and GdI_{2}. Lanthanum diiodide adopts the same tetragonal crystal structure as PrI_{2}.

Lanthanum(III) iodide reacts with lanthanum metal under an argon atmosphere in a tantalum capsule at 1225 K to form the mixed-valence compound La_{2}I_{5}.

Reduction of LaI_{2} or LaI_{3} with metallic sodium in an argon atmosphere at 550 °C gives lanthanum monoiodide, LaI, which has a hexagonal crystal structure.
