= Harrison–Meldola Memorial Prizes =

The Harrison–Meldola Memorial Prizes are annual prizes awarded by Royal Society of Chemistry to chemists in Britain who are 34 years of age or below. The prize is given to scientist who demonstrate the most meritorious and promising original investigations in chemistry and published results of those investigations. There are 3 prizes given every year, each winning £5000 and a medal. Candidates are not permitted to nominate themselves.

They were begun in 2008 when two previous awards, the Meldola Medal and Prize and the Edward Harrison Memorial Prize, were joined together. They commemorate Raphael Meldola and Edward Harrison.

== Winners of the Harrison–Meldola Memorial Prizes ==
Source: Royal Society of Chemistry

=== 2024 ===
- Yuval Elani, Imperial College London
- Sarah Lovelock, The University of Manchester
- Felice Torrisi, Imperial College London

=== 2023 ===
- Anna Slater, University of Liverpool
- Alexandra Gibbs, University of St Andrews
- James Dawson, Newcastle University

=== 2022 ===
- Volker Deringer, University of Oxford
- Marina Freitag, Newcastle University
- Paul McGonigal, Durham University

=== 2021 ===
- Nicholas Chilton, University of Manchester
- Fernanda Duarte, University of Oxford
- Ceri Hammond, Imperial College London

=== 2020 ===
- Thomas Bennett, University of Cambridge
- Anthony Green, University of Manchester
- Sihai Yang, University of Manchester

=== 2019 ===
- Rebecca Melen, Cardiff University
- Robert Phipps, University of Cambridge
- Mathew Powner, University College London

=== 2018 ===
- Kim Jelfs, Imperial College London
- Daniele Leonori, University of Manchester
- David Mills, University of Manchester

=== 2017 ===
- Matthew Baker, University of Strathclyde
- Mark Crimmin, Imperial College London
- Elaine O'Reilly, The University of Nottingham

=== 2016 ===
- Gonçalo Bernardes, University of Cambridge
- Susan Perkin, University of Oxford
- Sarah Staniland, The University of Sheffield

=== 2015 ===
- Adrian Chaplin, University of Warwick
- David Scanlon, University College London
- Robert Paton, University of Oxford

=== 2014 ===
- David Glowacki, University of Bristol
- Erwin Reisner, University of Cambridge
- Matthew Fuchter, Imperial College London

=== 2013 ===
- Andrew Baldwin, University of Oxford
- John Bower, University of Bristol
- Aron Walsh, University of Bath

=== 2012 ===
- Michael Ingleson, University of Manchester
- Tuomas Knowles, University of Cambridge
- Marina Kuimova, Imperial College London

=== 2011 ===
- Craig Banks, Manchester Metropolitan University
- Tomislav Friscic, University of Cambridge
- Philipp Kukura, University of Oxford

=== 2010 ===
- Scott Dalgarno, Heriot-Watt University
- Andrew Goodwin, University of Oxford
- Nathan S Lawrence, Schlumberger Cambridge Research

=== 2009 ===
- Eva Hevia, University of Strathclyde
- Petra Cameron, University of Bath
- Oren Scherman, University of Cambridge

== Previous winners of the Meldola Medal and Prize ==
The Meldola Medal and Prize commemorated Raphael Meldola, President of the Maccabaeans and the Institute of Chemistry. The last winners of the prize in 2007 were Hon Lam from the University of Edinburgh, and Rachel O'Reilly of the University of Cambridge.

== Previous winners of the Edward Harrison Memorial Prize ==
The Edward Harrison Memorial Prize commemorated the work of Edward Harrison who was credited with producing the first serviceable gas mask. The last winner of the prize was Katherine Holt of University College London.

== See also ==
- List of chemistry awards
