= Brian Hoffman =

Brian Hoffman may refer to:

- Brian Hoffman (musician), Deicide founder and guitarist
- Brian M. Hoffman (born 1941), American bioinorganic and physical chemist
