= Alison Walker (scientist) =

Physicist and Professor

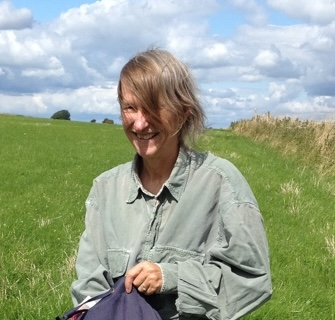
- Walker in 2014
- Education: University of Oxford
- Scientific career
- Workplaces: University of Bath; Michigan State University; University of East Anglia; Cambridge Display Technology
- Thesis: Studies of disorder in fastionics and of a nuclear quadrupole interaction in ordered markets (1980)
- Website: Device Modelling

Alison Bridget Walker is a physicist who is a professor at the University of Bath. Her research considers computational modelling of printed electronic devices and the development of perovskite solar cells. She is best known for her work on the Kinetic Monte Carlo method.

== Early life and education ==
Walker was born in Sarawak. She completed her undergraduate and postgraduate studies at the University of Oxford. Her doctoral research considered nuclear quadrupole interactions and fast ionic conductors. After earning her doctorate, Walker moved to the United States, where she joined Michigan State University as a postdoctoral fellow. She moved to the Daresbury Laboratory as a research fellow.

== Research and career ==
Walker started her independent scientific career at the University of East Anglia. She joined the University of Bath in 1998, where she was awarded a Royal Society Industry Fellowship to work at Cambridge Display Technology.

At Bath, Walker has been a team leader for the Centre of Excellence, EoCoE (Energy Oriented Centre of excellence, 2015-2018)] Walker works alongside Saiful Islam and Rob Scheichl, who are also funded by the EoCoE. Walker is the Academic Director for the Centre for Doctoral Training in New Sustainable PV (CDT-PV). This council is funded by the EPSRC, which has 7 universities and is headed by Ken Durose at the University of Liverpool.

Walker has developed kinetic Monte Carlo (KMC) approaches to better understand the electronic processes of printed electronic devices. In particular, she has considered photovoltaics and light emitting diodes (LEDs). Several different electronic processes take place in these devices, such as charge injection, the formation of excitons (bound electron – hole pairs), charge and exciton migration, and charge recombination/separation (dissociation). The KMCs developed by Walker take into account the complex three-dimensional morphology of the organic active layer and allow for investigations into how device architectures impact device performance. Beyond KMCs, Walker has developed drift-diffusion models to understand the movement of charge and energy in one-dimension.

In her efforts to understand the mechanisms that underpin device operation in OFETs, OLEDs and OPVs, Walker uses optical models that solve Maxwell's equations. These equations can be used to understand the variations in fields associated with photon absorption and generation. Such models can be used to understand the luminance, quantum efficiencies and current-voltage characteristics. A combination of the three models can be used to identify and optimize the positions of the dissociation and recombination zones. In 2013 Walker was made Academic Director of the Centre for Doctoral Training in New and Sustainable Photovoltaics, as well as co-leading the University of Bath SuperSolar network.

Walker has worked with Petra Cameron to investigate perovskite solar cells, hybrid devices that contain organic and inorganic materials. The active layers of these devices contain perovskite crystal structures, which strongly absorb solar radiation. Electrons within the perovskite are excited across the material bandgap, creating mobile charge carriers that migrate to electron and hole transport layers. Walker was made coordinator of the Horizon 2020 program making perovskite truly exploitable (Maestro). Walker has created protein simulations to understand the structure and function of biologically-relevant molecules.

== Selected publications ==
- James Robert Jennings; Andrei Ghicov; Laurence M Peter; Patrik Schmuki; Alison B Walker (6 September 2008). "Dye-sensitized solar cells based on oriented TiO2 nanotube arrays: transport, trapping, and transfer of electrons". Journal of the American Chemical Society. 130 (40): 13364–13372. doi:10.1021/ja804852z. ISSN 0002-7863. PMID 18774820. Wikidata Q46386309.
- Federico Brivio; Alison B. Walker; Aron Walsh (October 2013). "Structural and electronic properties of hybrid perovskites for high-efficiency thin-film photovoltaics from first-principles". APL Materials. 1 (4): 042111. arXiv:1309.4215. doi:10.1063/1.4824147. ISSN 2166-532X. Wikidata Q59463302.
- Peter K Watkins; Alison B Walker; Geraldine L B Verschoor (1 September 2005). "Dynamical Monte Carlo modelling of organic solar cells: the dependence of internal quantum efficiency on morphology". Nano Letters. 5 (9): 1814–1818. doi:10.1021/nl051098o. ISSN 1530-6984. PMID 16159229. Wikidata Q51356005.
