= Matthew Fuchter =

British chemist

Matthew Fuchter FRSC
- Born: Matthew John Fuchter; England, United Kingdom
- Education: University of Bristol; Imperial College London
- Awards: Harrison-Meldola Memorial Prize (2014) Blavatnik Awards for Young Scientists (2020); Corday–Morgan Prize (2021)
- Scientific career
- Workplaces: University of Melbourne; Imperial College London; University College London; University of Oxford
- Thesis: Synthetic studies on porphyrazines : biological applications and new preparative methods (2006)
- Doctoral advisor: Anthony Barrett
- Website: www.imperial.ac.uk/people/m.fuchter

Matthew John Fuchter FRSC is a British chemist who is a professor of chemistry at the University of Oxford. His research focuses on the development and application of novel functional molecular systems to a broad range of areas; from materials to medicine. He has been awarded both the Harrison-Meldola Memorial Prize (2014) and the Corday–Morgan Prizes (2021) of the Royal Society of Chemistry. In 2020 he was a finalist for the Blavatnik Awards for Young Scientists.

== Early life and education ==
Fuchter earned a master's degree (MSci) in chemistry at the University of Bristol, where he was awarded the Richard Dixon prize. It was during his undergraduate degree that he first became interested in organic synthesis. As a graduate student he moved to Imperial College London, where he worked with Anthony Barrett on the synthesis and applications of porphyrazines, including as therapeutic agents. During his doctoral studies Barrett and Fuchter collaborated with Brian M. Hoffman at Northwestern University.

== Research and career ==
After completing his PhD, Fuchter moved to Australia, for postdoctoral research at CSIRO and the University of Melbourne, where he worked with Andrew Bruce Holmes. In 2007 Fuchter returned to the United Kingdom, where he began his independent academic career at the School of Pharmacy, University of London (now UCL School of Pharmacy). Less than one year later he was appointed a Lecturer at Imperial College London, where he was promoted to Reader (Associate Professor) in 2015 and professor in 2019. Fuchter develops photoswitchable molecules, chiral materials and new pharmaceuticals.

Fuchter is interested in how considerations of chirality can be applied to the development of novel approaches in chiral optoelectronic materials and devices. In particular, he focusses on the introduction of chiral-optical (so-called chiroptical) properties into optoelectronic materials. Amongst these materials, Fuchter has extensively evaluated the use of chiral small molecule additives (helicenes) to induce chiroptical properties into light emitting polymers for the realisation of chiral (circularly polarised, CP) OLEDs. He has also investigated the application of such materials in circularly polarised photodetectors, which are devices that are capable of detecting circularly polarised light. As well as using chiral functional materials for light emission and detection, Fuchter has investigated the charge transport properties of enantiopure and racemic chiral functional materials.

Fuchter has also developed novel molecular photoswitches – molecules that can be cleanly and reversibly interconverted between two states using light – with a focus on heteroaromatic versions of azobenzene. The arylazopyrazole switches developed by Fuchter out perform the ubiquitous azobenzene switches, demonstrating complete photoswitching in both directions and thermal half-lives of the Z isomer of up to 46 years. Fuchter continues to apply these switches to a range of photoaddressable applications from photopharmacology to energy storage.

Alongside his work on functional material discovery, Fuchter works in medicinal chemistry and develops small molecule ligands that can either inhibit or stimulate the activity of disease relevant proteins. While he has worked on many drug targets, he has specialised in proteins involved in the transcriptional and epigenetic processes of disease. A particular interest has been the development of inhibitors for the histone-lysine methyltransferase enzymes in the Plasmodium parasite that causes human malaria.

In 2018 one of the cancer drugs developed by Fuchter, together with Anthony Barrett, Simak Ali and Charles Coombes entered a phase 1 clinical trial, and as of 2020, it is in phase 2. The drug, which was designed using computational chemistry, inhibits the cyclin-dependent kinase 7 (CDK7), a transcriptional regulatory protein that also regulates the cell cycle. Certain cancers rely on CDK7, so inhibition of this enzyme has potential to have a significant impact on cancer pathogenesis.

In 2024 Fuchter joined the University of Oxford as a Professor of Chemistry and the Sydney Bailey Fellow in Chemistry at St Peter’s College Oxford.

=== Academic service ===
Fuchter serves on the editorial board of MedChemComm. He is an elected council member of the Royal Society of Chemistry organic division. Fuchter is co-director of the Imperial College London Centre for Drug Discovery Science.

== Awards and honours ==
- 2014 Royal Society of ChemistryHarrison-Meldola Memorial Prize
- 2014 Elected a Fellow of the Royal Society of Chemistry (FRSC)
- 2015 Thieme Medical Publishers Chemistry Journal Awardee
- 2017 Imperial College London President's Award for Excellence in Research
- 2017 Imperial College London President’s Medal for Excellence in Innovation and Entrepreneurship
- 2018 Tetrahedron Young Investigator Award
- 2018 Engineering and Physical Sciences Research Council (EPSRC) Established career fellowship
- 2020 Blavatnik Awards for Young Scientists
- 2021 Royal Society of Chemistry Corday–Morgan Prize
- 2022 Royal Society of Chemistry Stephanie L. Kwolek Award
- 2023 Royal Society of Chemistry Biological and Medicinal Chemistry Sector Malcolm Campbell Memorial Prize
- 2023 Elected Fellow of the European Academy of Sciences and Arts

== Selected publications ==
- Malmquist, N. A.; Moss, T. A.; Mecheri, S.; Scherf, A.; Fuchter, M. J. (2012). "Small-molecule histone methyltransferase inhibitors display rapid antimalarial activity against all blood stage forms in Plasmodium falciparum". Proceedings of the National Academy of Sciences. 109 (41): 16708–16713. Bibcode:2012PNAS..10916708M. doi:10.1073/pnas.1205414109. ISSN 0027-8424. PMC 3478629. PMID 23011794.
- Cherblanc, Fanny L; Chapman, Kathryn L; Brown, Robert; Fuchter, Matthew J (2013). "Chaetocin is a nonspecific inhibitor of histone lysine methyltransferases". Nature Chemical Biology. 9 (3): 136–137. doi:10.1038/nchembio.1187. ISSN 1552-4450. PMID 23416387.
- Dembélé, Laurent; Franetich, Jean-François; Lorthiois, Audrey; Gego, Audrey; Zeeman, Anne-Marie; Kocken, Clemens H. M.; Le Grand, Roger; Dereuddre-Bosquet, Nathalie; van Gemert, Geert-Jan; Sauerwein, Robert; Vaillant, Jean-Christophe (2014). "Persistence and activation of malaria hypnozoites in long-term primary hepatocyte cultures". Nature Medicine. 20 (3): 307–312. doi:10.1038/nm.3461. ISSN 1546-170X. PMID 24509527. S2CID 13909994.
- Gerkman, Mihael A.; Gibson, Rosina S. L.; Calbo, Joaquín; Shi, Yuran; Fuchter, Matthew J.; Han, Grace G. D. (2020). "Arylazopyrazoles for Long-Term Thermal Energy Storage and Optically Triggered Heat Release below 0 °C". Journal of the American Chemical Society. 142 (19): 8688–8695. doi:10.1021/jacs.0c00374. hdl:10044/1/78223. ISSN 0002-7863. PMID 32319773. S2CID 216073944.
- Yang, Ying; da Costa, Rosenildo Correa; Fuchter, Matthew J.; Campbell, Alasdair J. (2013). "Circularly polarized light detection by a chiral organic semiconductor transistor". Nature Photonics. 7 (8): 634–638. Bibcode:2013NaPho...7..634Y. doi:10.1038/nphoton.2013.176. hdl:10044/1/15224. ISSN 1749-4893. S2CID 121809598.
- Yang, Ying; Costa, Rosenildo Correa da; Smilgies, Detlef-M.; Campbell, Alasdair J.; Fuchter, Matthew J. (2013). "Induction of Circularly Polarized Electroluminescence from an Achiral Light-Emitting Polymer via a Chiral Small-Molecule Dopant". Advanced Materials. 25 (18): 2624–2628. doi:10.1002/adma.201204961. ISSN 1521-4095. PMC 3659407. PMID 23554220.
- Brandt, Jochen R.; Wang, Xuhua; Yang, Ying; Campbell, Alasdair J.; Fuchter, Matthew J. (2016). "Circularly Polarized Phosphorescent Electroluminescence with a High Dissymmetry Factor from PHOLEDs Based on a Platinahelicene". Journal of the American Chemical Society. 138 (31): 9743–9746. doi:10.1021/jacs.6b02463. hdl:10044/1/37512. ISSN 0002-7863. PMID 27434383.
