= Petra Cameron =

British chemist

Petra Jane Cameron
- Education: University of Edinburgh; University of Bath
- Scientific career
- Workplaces: University of Bath; Max Planck Institute for Polymer Research
- Thesis: Studies of dye sensitized solar cells (2004)

Petra J. Cameron is a British chemist who is a professor at the University of Bath. Her research considers energy materials and photovoltaics. She was awarded the 2009 Harrison–Meldola Memorial Prize for her work on solar cells.

== Early life and education ==
Cameron studied chemistry at the University of Edinburgh. She moved to the University of Bath, where she worked on dye-sensitized solar cells for her doctoral research. She spent two years at the Max Planck Institute for Polymer Research. In 2007, Cameron returned to the United Kingdom, where she was awarded a Research Councils UK fellowship. She was awarded a Royal Society of Chemistry Harrison–Meldola Memorial Prize.

== Research and career ==
In 2012, Cameron was made a Senior Lecturer at the University of Bath. She is a member of the Bath Institute of Sustainability and Climate Change.

Cameron investigates the functional properties of perovskite solar cells using electrochemical and spectroscopic approaches, with the hope to improve their stability and operational lifetime. She has explored the use of device modelling and machine learning to understand the performance of emerging materials systems. She has also developed other materials systems for photovoltaics, including self-assembled peptide hydrogels.

Cameron is also interested in photo-microbial fuel cells, which are light activated cells that contain photosynthetic organisms that convert carbon dioxide into electrical energy. Her early work explored how biological fuel cells could use energy from plants, including moss. She developed a spray for coating the inside of greenhouses to optimise the energy of light irradiating plants, with the hope to improve their yield and growth. Such a spray could extend growing seasons in countries without long summers due to their climate and latitude. This programme, supported by Department for Environment, Food and Rural Affairs, created a spray that absorbs blue light and converts it to red, enhancing the amount of light that can be used by the growing crops. It also scatters the light around the greenhouse, which increases the yield. Critically, Cameron's research used an abundant, low cost luminescent down-shifting material.

== Selected publications ==
- Giles Richardson; Simon E. J. O'Kane; Ralf G. Niemann; Timo A. Peltola; Jamie M. Foster; Petra J. Cameron; Alison B. Walker (2016). "Can slow-moving ions explain hysteresis in the current–voltage curves of perovskite solar cells?". Energy & Environmental Science. 9 (4): 1476–1485. Bibcode:2016EnEnS...9.1476R. doi:10.1039/c5ee02740c. ISSN 1754-5692. Wikidata Q57877213.
- Petra J. Cameron; Laurence M. Peter (December 2003). "Characterization of Titanium Dioxide Blocking Layers in Dye-Sensitized Nanocrystalline Solar Cells". The Journal of Physical Chemistry B. 107 (51): 14394–14400. doi:10.1021/jp030790+. ISSN 1520-6106. Wikidata Q105397624.
- Adam Pockett; Giles E. Eperon; Timo Peltola; Henry J. Snaith; Alison Walker; Laurence M. Peter; Petra J. Cameron (5 February 2015). "Characterization of Planar Lead Halide Perovskite Solar Cells by Impedance Spectroscopy, Open-Circuit Photovoltage Decay, and Intensity-Modulated Photovoltage/Photocurrent Spectroscopy". The Journal of Physical Chemistry C. 119 (7): 3456–3465. doi:10.1021/jp510837q. ISSN 1932-7447. Wikidata Q60239615.
