= Susan Perkin =

British chemist

- Education: University of Oxford
- Scientific career
- Workplaces: University College London; University of Oxford
- Thesis: Counterion and charge correlation effects on surface interactions (2006)
- Website: Surface Forces Research Laboratory

Susan Perkin is a British chemist who is a Professor of Physical Chemistry at the University of Oxford. Her research considers the physics of liquids and soft matter. She was awarded the 2016 Harrison-Meldola Memorial Prize and named the Soft Matter Lecturer of 2018. In 2015 Perkin was awarded a European Research Council starting grant and in 2020 she was awarded a European Research Council consolidator grant.

== Early life and education ==
Perkin was an undergraduate student at the University of Oxford, where she completed a master's degree in chemistry at St John's College. She remained at Oxford for her doctoral research, where she worked alongside Jacob Klein. Her research involved placements at Oxford and the Weizmann Institute of Science. Before completing her doctorate, Perkin was made a Junior Research Fellow at Merton College, Oxford.

== Research and career ==
In 2007 Perkin was named a Research Councils UK Fellow at University College London. She returned to Oxford in 2012 to join the faculty in the Department of Chemistry, where she serves as a Fellow of Trinity College.

Perkin is interested in liquid interfaces, and explores them using a surface forces balance. In such experiments, liquids are confined between insulators or electrodes, and measurements are made of their mechanical, optical, electrical and dynamic properties. This set-up allows for characterisation of materials properties in both natural (i.e. non-biased) and working (i.e. during device operation) environments. This type of characterisation is essential to the application of functional materials in energy storage and bio-materials.

She leads a European Research Council funded programme that looks at electrolytic materials, in an effort to understand the fundamental physics that underpins their properties and interactions. Electrolytic materials are used in the electrolytes for batteries and form the interiors of halophilic organisms. One type of electrolyte is an ionic liquid, which is in a liquid state in ambient conditions because their asymmetric, bulky ionic structures will not crystallise. Despite this, the dynamics of ionic liquids cannot be explained using conventional physical theories. By using surface force analysis to study ionic liquids, Perkin has shown it is possible to estimate the screening length, near-surface ordering, capacitance and charge regulation.

== Awards and honours ==
- 2015 European Research Council Starting Grant
- 2016 Meldola Medal and Prize
- 2016 Philip Leverhulme Prize
- 2018 Soft Matter Lectureship
- 2020 European Research Council Consolidator Grant
- 2023 Blavatnik Awards for Young Scientists UK Laureate in Chemistry

== Selected publications ==
- Perkin, Susan (2012-03-21). "Ionic liquids in confined geometries". Physical Chemistry Chemical Physics. 14 (15): 5052–5062. Bibcode:2012PCCP...14.5052P. doi:10.1039/C2CP23814D. ISSN 1463-9084. PMID 22301770.
- Perkin, Susan; Albrecht, Tim; Klein, Jacob (2010-01-26). "Layering and shear properties of an ionic liquid, 1-ethyl-3-methylimidazolium ethylsulfate, confined to nano-films between mica surfaces". Physical Chemistry Chemical Physics. 12 (6): 1243–1247. Bibcode:2010PCCP...12.1243P. doi:10.1039/B920571C. ISSN 1463-9084. PMID 20119601.
- Smith, Alexander M.; Lee, Alpha A.; Perkin, Susan (2016-06-16). "The Electrostatic Screening Length in Concentrated Electrolytes Increases with Concentration". The Journal of Physical Chemistry Letters. 7 (12): 2157–2163. arXiv:1607.03926. doi:10.1021/acs.jpclett.6b00867. PMID 27216986. S2CID 8714486.
