= Cerium iodide =

Cerium iodide may refer to:

- Cerium diiodide, CeI_{2}
- Cerium(III) iodide (Cerium triiodide), CeI_{3}
