= Tuomas Knowles =

- Education: ETH Zurich, University of Cambridge, University of Geneva
- Known for: Protein biophysics
- Awards: Corday–Morgan Prize from the Royal Society of Chemistry, Raymond and Beverly Sackler International Prize in Biophysics, Harrison-Meldola Memorial Prize from the Royal Society of Chemistry, Rita and John Cornforth Award, Royal Society of Chemistry, 2019
- Scientific career
- Fields: Biophysics, Chemistry, Physical Chemistry
- Workplaces: University of Cambridge
- Doctoral advisor: Sir Mark Welland
- Other academic advisors: Sir Chris Dobson

Tuomas Knowles is a British scientist and Professor of Physical Chemistry and Biophysics at the Department of Chemistry and at the Cavendish Laboratory at the University of Cambridge. He is the co-director of the Cambridge Centre for Misfolding Diseases and a Fellow of St John's College, Cambridge. Prof. Knowles is a co-founder of four biotechnology companies: Fluidic Analytics, Wren Therapeutics, Xampla and Transition Bio. He was also the Cambridge Enterprise Academic Entrepreneur of the year in 2019.

== Education ==
Tuomas Knowles studied Biology at the University of Geneva and Physics at the Swiss Federal Institute of Technology in Zurich and at the University of Cambridge. He holds a Ph.D. in Physics from the University of Cambridge and a master's degree in Physics from the Swiss Federal Institute of Technology Zurich. He was a visiting scholar at Harvard University and Weston Visiting Professor at the Weizmann Institute of Science in Israel.

== Research ==
The research of Knowles focuses on understanding protein behavior in health and disease. He is known for his work on protein aggregation and for describing the kinetics of this process and the underlying molecular mechanisms. He discovered the first integrated rate law for amyloid formation which has allowed the mechanisms of this process to be elucidated by researchers worldwide and together with collaborators he has made software available to the research community for kinetic analysis of protein aggregation. He has published over 450 papers, has an H-index of 108 and has been named a Highly Cited Researcher by the Web of Science.

== Awards and honors ==
- Corday-Morgan Prize from the Royal Society of Chemistry (awarded in 2017).
- Raymond and Beverly Sackler International Prize in Biophysics (awarded in 2017).
- Harrison-Meldola Memorial Prize from the Royal Society of Chemistry
- Young Investigator Award and Medal, British Biophysical Society
- Young Scientist Prize in Biological Physics, International Union of Pure and Applied Physics
- Rita and John Cornforth Award, The Royal Society of Chemistry
