= Neodymium(III) iodide =

Neodymium (III) iodide
Names
- IUPAC name Triiodoneodymium
- Other names Neodymium triiodide, Neodymium iodide

Identifiers
CAS Number	13813-24-6
3D model (JSmol)	Interactive image
ChemSpider	75394
ECHA InfoCard	100.034.047
EC Number	237-467-7
PubChem CID	83745
CompTox Dashboard (EPA)	DTXSID0065642
- InChI: InChI=1S/3HI.Nd/h3*1H;/q;;;+3/p-3 Key: DKSXWSAKLYQPQE-UHFFFAOYSA-K
- SMILES: I[Nd](I)I

Properties
Chemical formula	NdI_{3}
Molar mass	524.96 g/mol
Appearance	Green solid
Melting point	684 °C (1,263 °F; 957 K)

Structure
Coordination geometry	9

Hazards
- GHS labelling
Pictograms	(GHS07: Exclamation mark) (GHS08: Health hazard) (GHS09: Environmental hazard)
Signal word	Danger

Related compounds
Other anions	Neodymium acetate, Neodymium hydride, Neodymium nickelate
Other cations	erbium iodide, cerium iodide, terbium iodide
- Except where otherwise noted, data are given for materials in their standard state (at 25 °C [77 °F], 100 kPa). Infobox references

Neodymium(III) iodide is an inorganic salt of iodine and neodymium with the formula NdI_{3}. Neodymium uses the +3 oxidation state in the compound. The anhydrous compound is a green powdery solid at room temperature.

== Preparation ==
Heating neodymium and iodine in an inert atmosphere produces this salt:

2 Nd + 3 I_{2} → 2 NdI_{3}

It can also be prepared by the reaction of neodymium(III) oxide and hydroiodic acid to make a hydrate:

Nd_{2}O_{3} + 6 HI → 2 NdI_{3} + 3 H_{2}O

The anhydrate can then be obtained by heating the nonahydrate with ammonium iodide:

NdI_{3} • 9 H_{2}O + nNH_{4}I → NdI_{3} + nNH_{3} + nHI + 9H_{2}O

== Physical properties ==
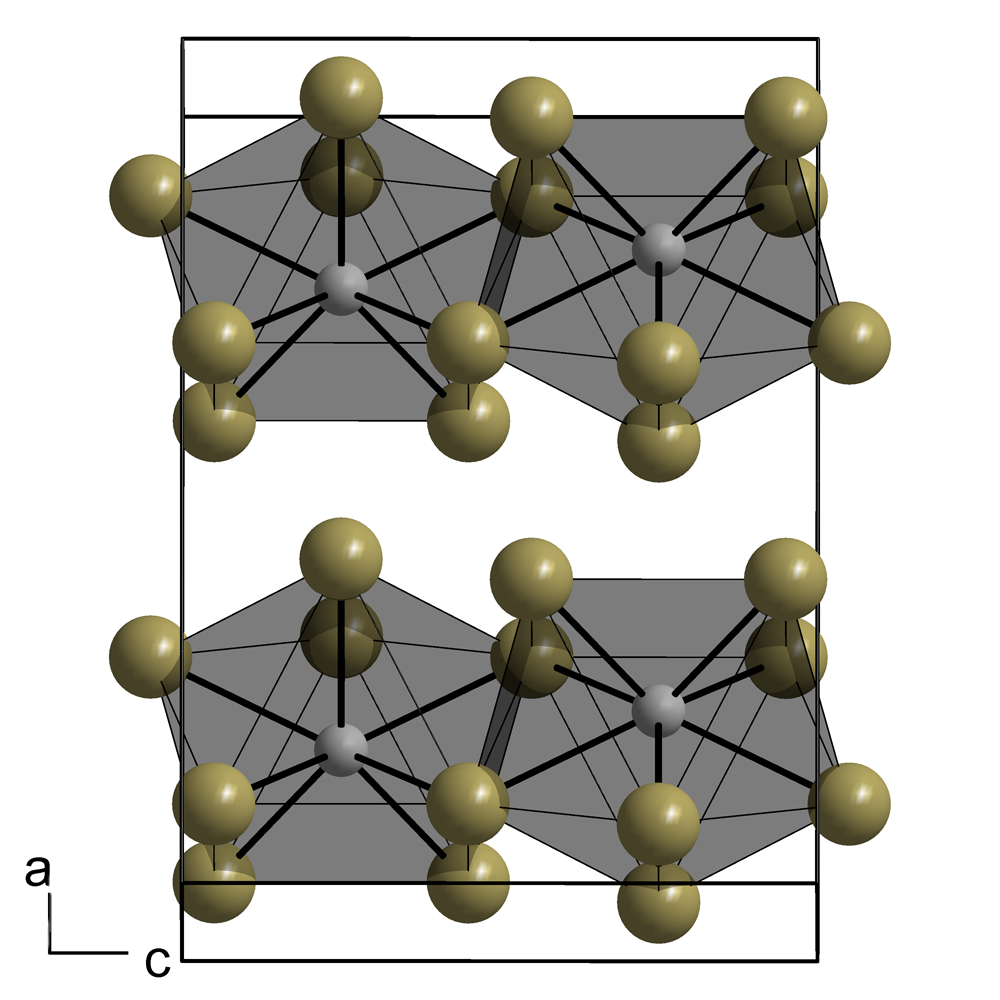
Crystal structure of Neodymium iodide Nd^{3+} I^{−}

Neodymium(III) iodide forms green, water-soluble hygroscopic crystals. It has a melting point of 784°C. It forms a nonahydrate crystal NdI_{3}.9H_{2}O – belongs to the orthorhombic crystal system, space group Pmmn, lattice constants a = 1.16604 nm, b = 0.80103 nm, c = 0.89702 nm, Z = 4.

== Other compounds ==
NdI_{3} also forms some compounds with N_{2}H_{4}, such as NdI_{3}·3N_{2}H_{4}·2H_{2}O which is a dark green crystal, soluble in methanol and ethanol and insoluble in water, benzene and toluene, d_{20°C} = 3.42 g/cm³.

NdI_{3} also forms some compounds with urea, such as NdI_{3}5CO(NH_{2})_{2} which is a lavender color crystal.

NdI_{3} also forms some compounds with thiourea, such as NdI_{3}·2CS(NH_{2})2·9H_{2}O which is a pale pink crystal.

== See also ==
- Neodymium(II) iodide
- Neodymium
- Iodine
- Lanthanide
