= Kim Jelfs =

Computational chemist

- Education: University College London
- Scientific career
- Workplaces: Imperial College London University of Liverpool University of Barcelona
- Thesis: Modelling the growth of zeolitic materials (2010)

Kim E. Jelfs is a computational chemist based at Imperial College London who was one of the recipients of the Harrison-Meldola Memorial Prizes in 2018. She develops software to predict the structures and properties of molecular systems for renewable energy.

== Early life and education ==
Jelfs studied chemistry at University College London. For her final year project, Jelfs worked at the Royal Institution. She earned her PhD in 2010, working with Ben Slater on modelling the growth of zeolitic materials.

== Research and career ==
After completing her PhD Jelfs joined the University of Barcelona, working with Stefan Bromley. She moved to the University of Liverpool, working as a postdoctoral researcher with Matthew Rosseinsky and Andrew Ian Cooper. At the University of Liverpool Jelfs characterised the structure of porous materials. She was funded by an Engineering and Physical Sciences Research Council Programme Grant.

In 2013 she joined Imperial College London as a Royal Society University Research Fellow. In 2015 she was awarded a European Research Council Starting Grant, which provides €1.5 million funding for five years of materials discovery. Her research will consider porous molecules, organic small molecules and polymers. She uses computational models to predict the relationships between structure and properties. The models can also be used to predict the properties of amorphous frameworks and porous molecules. Her group identified the 20 most probable topologies for porous cage molecules, which can be synthesised through dynamic covalent chemistry.

In 2018 Jelfs was awarded the Harrison-Meldola Memorial Prize from the Royal Society of Chemistry. She was also awarded an Imperial College London President's Award for Outstanding Early Career Research. In 2019, she was awarded a Philip Leverhulme Prize in Chemistry. In 2025, Jelfs was awarded the Royal Society of Chemistry's Corday-Morgan Prize.
