= Edward Harrison (chemist) =

English chemical scientist

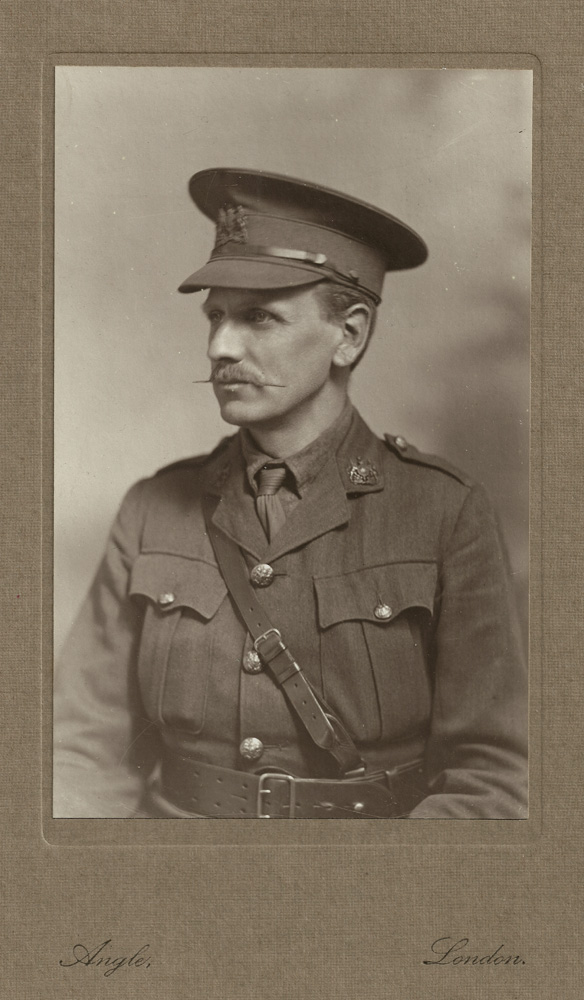
Colonel Edward Frank Harrison

Lt-Col Edward Frank Harrison C.M.G. (1869–1918), was an English chemical scientist, credited with the invention of the first serviceable gas mask during the First World War.

== Biography ==
Born in Camberwell, Harrison, at the age of 14, was apprenticed to a pharmacist, at the end of which he was awarded the Royal Pharmaceutical Society's Jacob Bell Scholarship. As a student, he was awarded medals in chemistry, botany, and materia medica. He qualified as a pharmaceutical chemist in 1891, becoming a demonstrator in the Society's laboratory and school. He later became head of the analytical laboratory at Burroughs Wellcome, and assisted in the compilation of the British Pharmaceutical Codex.

At the outbreak of World War I, Harrison tried to enlist in the British army, but was rejected on account of his age (47 at the time), but was accepted as a corporal into a "sportsman's battalion" in 1915. After the first use of gas weapons by the German Army in 1915, the British War Office enlisted chemists, including Harrison, to find a way of defending against such weapons.

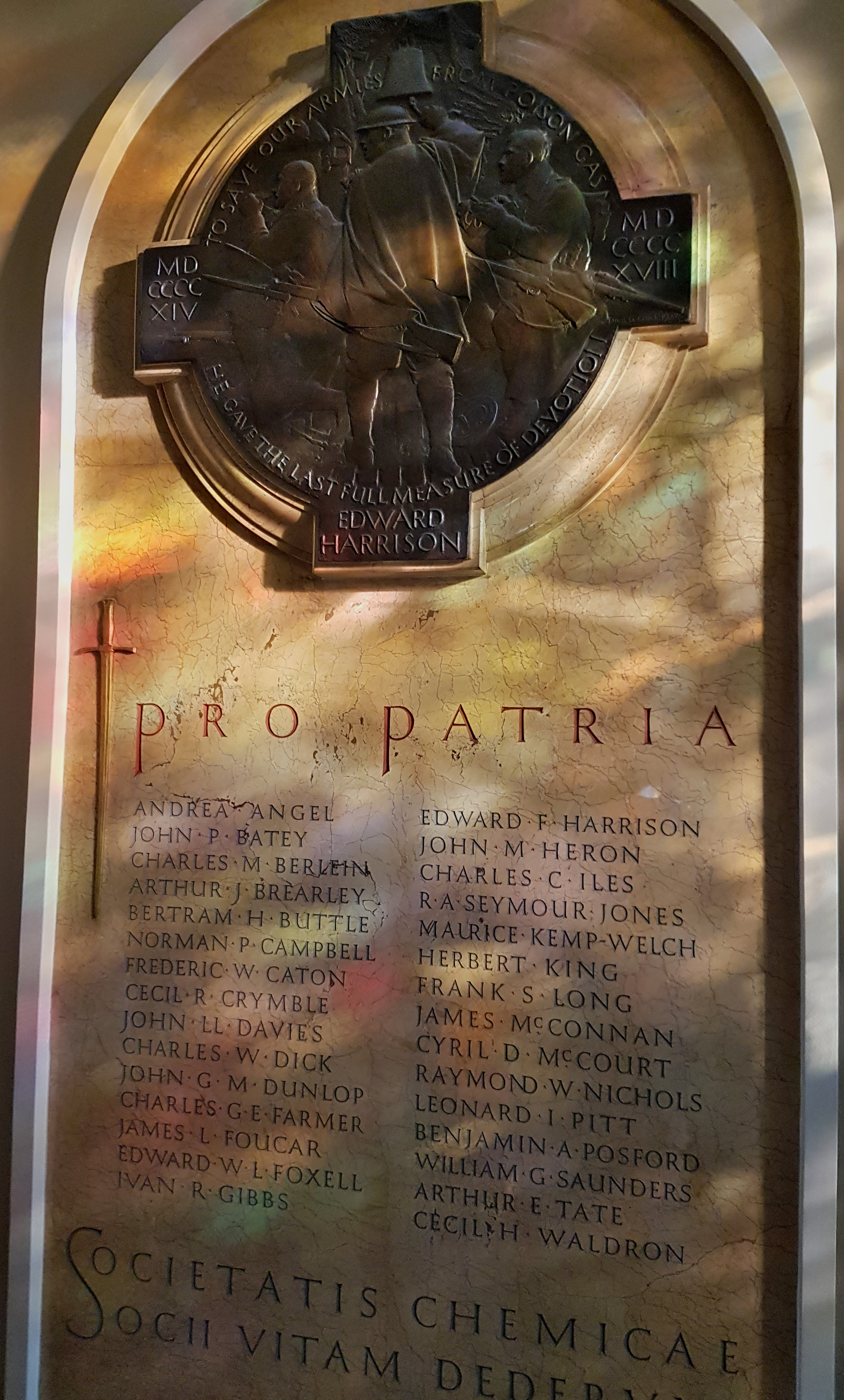
The Chemical Society Memorial at the Royal Society of Chemistry

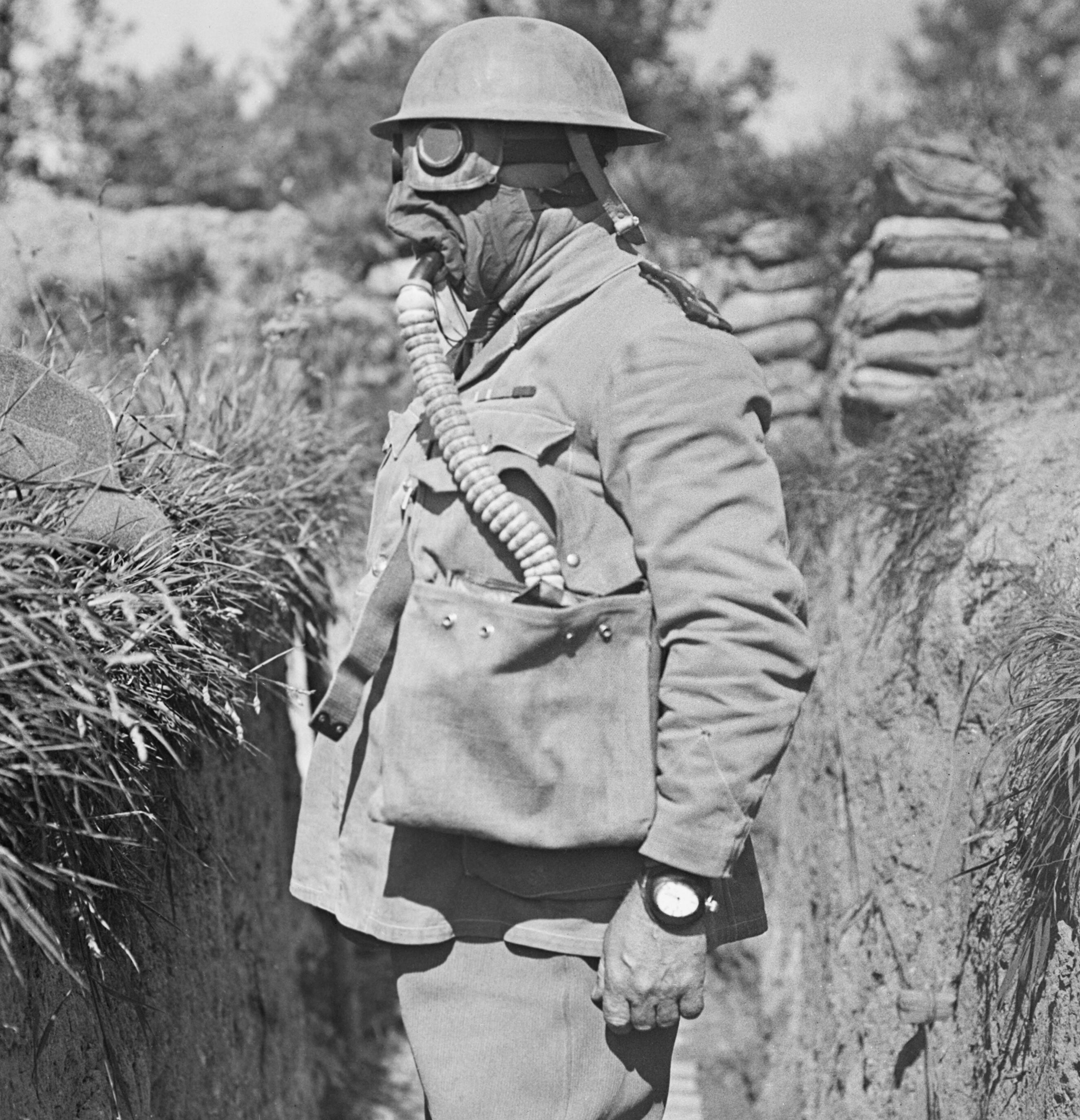
First World War box respirator

Harrison produced the large box respirator, the first serviceable British gas mask, which he and his team perfected by using themselves as test subjects and exposing themselves to poisonous gases in sealed rooms. Harrison continued to work tirelessly for the remainder of the war, and his continued improvements saw him repeatedly promoted, reaching the rank of Lt Col in the Royal Engineers. Harrison died of pneumonia at 49, one week before Armistice Day.

In a letter to his widow, the Minister of Munitions, Winston Churchill, wrote, "It is in large measure to him that our troops have been given effectual protection from the German poisonous gases", and that he would have been promoted to Brigadier-General in charge of all chemical warfare.

Harrison had been awarded the French Légion d'honneur, was made a member of Italy's Order of St Maurice and St Lazarus, and was buried with full military honours.

After his death the Chemical Society was approached to host a memorial to Harrison, which was expanded by the Society to commemorate all the Society's Fellows who had died in service of the country. The completed memorial, sculpted by Ernest Gillick, was unveiled on 16 November 1922; it was later relocated in 1967 when the Society moved to the East Wing of Burlington House. The Edward Harrison Memorial Prize awarded by the Chemical Society and latterly the Harrison-Meldola Memorial Prizes awarded by the Royal Society of Chemistry are named in his honour.
