= Martin Schröder (chemist) =

British chemist of Estonian origin (born 1954)

Martin Schröder FRSE FRSC MAE
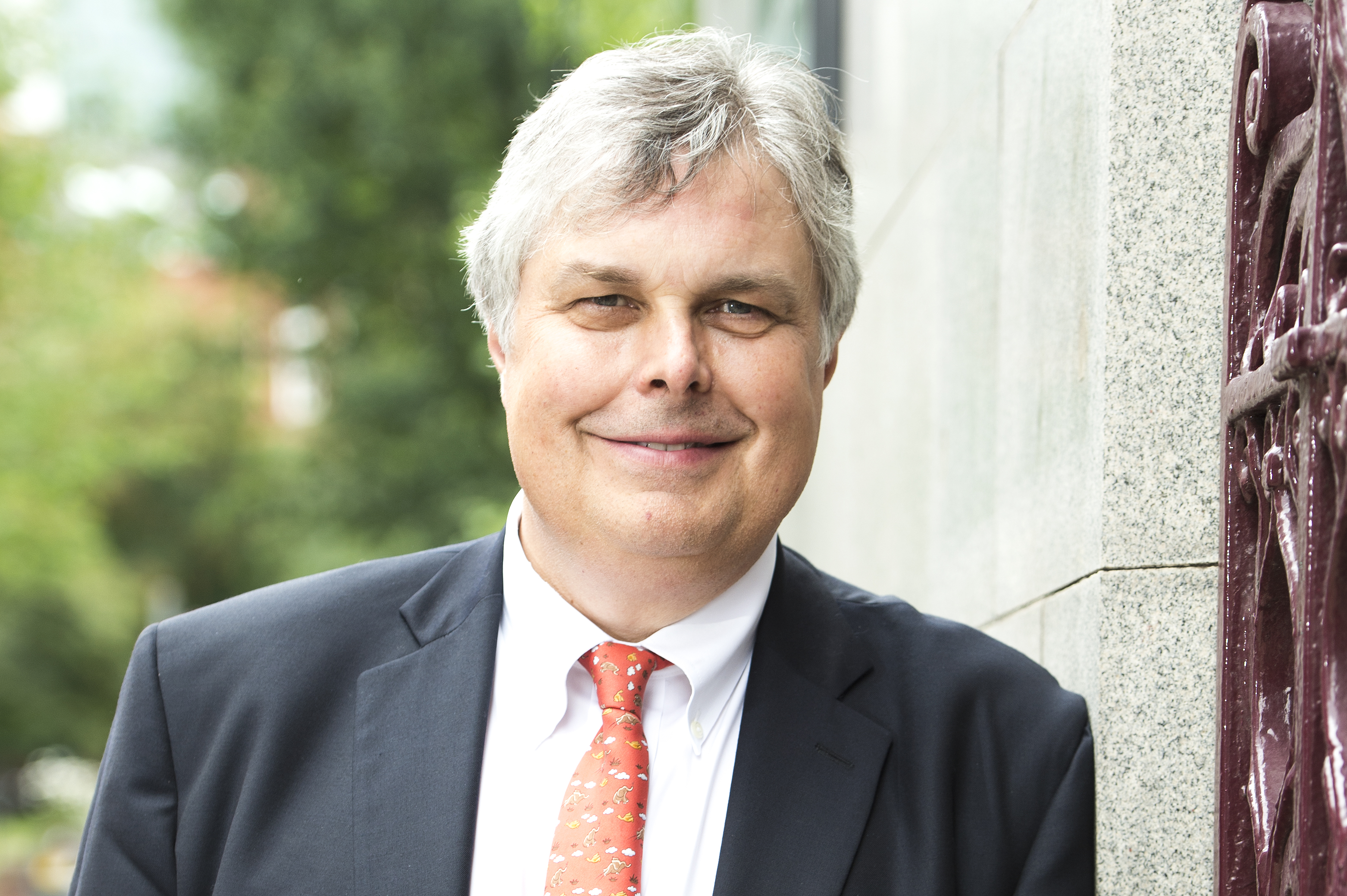
- Martin Schröder (2025)
- Born: 1954 (age 71–72)
- Education: Slough Grammar School
- Alma mater: University of Sheffield (BSc); Imperial College London (PhD)
- Awards: Royal Society Wolfson Research Merit Award (2005)
- Scientific career
- Fields: Coordination chemistry Materials chemistry
- Institutions: University of Manchester; University of Nottingham; University of Cambridge; ETH Zurich; University of Edinburgh
- Thesis: Reactions of oxo complexes of osmium and ruthenium (1978)
- Doctoral advisor: William P. Griffith
- Doctoral students: Sihai Yang
- Website: research.manchester.ac.uk/en/persons/martin-schröder

Martin Schröder is a British chemist who is a Research Professor of Chemistry who served as Vice President and Dean of the Faculty of Science and Engineering at the University of Manchester from 2015 to 2025. He also served as Executive Dean of the Faculty of Science from 2011 to 2015 and Professor of Inorganic Chemistry at the University of Nottingham from 1995 to 2015.

== Early life and education ==
Martin Schröder was born in Taplow, Buckinghamshire of Estonian refugee parents in 1954, and was educated at Montem Primary School and Slough Grammar School. He is first in family to attend university, and was awarded a BSc degree in chemistry from the University of Sheffield in 1975 and a PhD from Imperial College of Science, Technology and Medicine, London in 1978 where his research on oxo complexes of osmium and ruthenium was supervised by William P. Griffith.

== Career ==
After postdoctoral fellowships at the ETH, Zürich with Albert Eschenmoser, funded by a Royal Society-Swiss National Foundation Fellowship, and at the University of Cambridge with Lord Lewis of Newnham, he was appointed to a senior demonstratorship at the University of Edinburgh in 1982. He was subsequently promoted to Lecturer, Reader and then Professor, and in 1995 was appointed to the University of Nottingham as Head and Professor of Inorganic Chemistry. He served as head of the School of Chemistry at the University of Nottingham from 1999 to 2005, and as Executive Dean of the Faculty of Science (2011–2015). In 2015 he moved to the University of Manchester as Vice-President and Dean of the Faculty of Science and Engineering and Professor of Chemistry.

Schröder has been a visiting professor at the University of Toronto, Canada, the University of Otago, Dunedin, New Zealand, and the Université Louis Pasteur, Strasbourg, France. He has published over 600 publications and patents. His early independent research focussed on the chemistry of transition metal thioether and aza macrocyclic complexes with particular focus on the stabilisation of unusual oxidation state species. This work led to the isolation and characterisation of unique mononuclear M(I)/(III) (M = Ni, Pd, Pt) and M(II) (M = Ag, Au, Rh, Ir) complexes. His current research focuses on the development of new advanced functional materials, particularly metal-organic framework materials for selective fuel and toxic gas capture, purification and catalysis.He is currently (since 2021) a Member of Council of the Engineering and Physical Sciences Research Council (EPSRC).

== Controversy ==
In 2021, Schröder sent an email to Christopher Jackson in his capacity as a Vice President of the University of Manchester, linking to a right wing website GB News and disputing the presence of institutional racism at the University of Manchester. Jackson has subsequently left the institution, and Schröder has declined to apologise.

== Awards and honours ==
In 1994 he was elected Fellow of the Royal Society of Edinburgh (FRSE) and Fellow of the Royal Society of Chemistry (FRSC), and in 2016 he was elected Member of Academia Europaea (MAE). He has been a recipient of a Royal Society of Edinburgh Support Research Fellowship (1991/92), a Leverhulme Trust Senior Research Fellowship (2005/6), and a Royal Society Wolfson Merit Award (2005-2010). He has been awarded Honorary Degrees from Tallinn Technical University and from Nikolaev Institute of Inorganic Chemistry, Russian Academy of Sciences.

Martin Schröder has been awarded Royal Society of Chemistry awards and prizes including:

Corday-Morgan Medal and Prize (1991)
Tilden Lectureship and Medal (2001)
Award for Chemistry of Transition Metals (2003)
Award for Chemistry of the Noble Metals and their Compounds (2008)
Nyholm Prize for Inorganic Chemistry (2020)
Dalton Horizon Prize for Functional Framework Materials: Design and Characterisation (2024)
