= Sihai Yang =

Chinese chemist

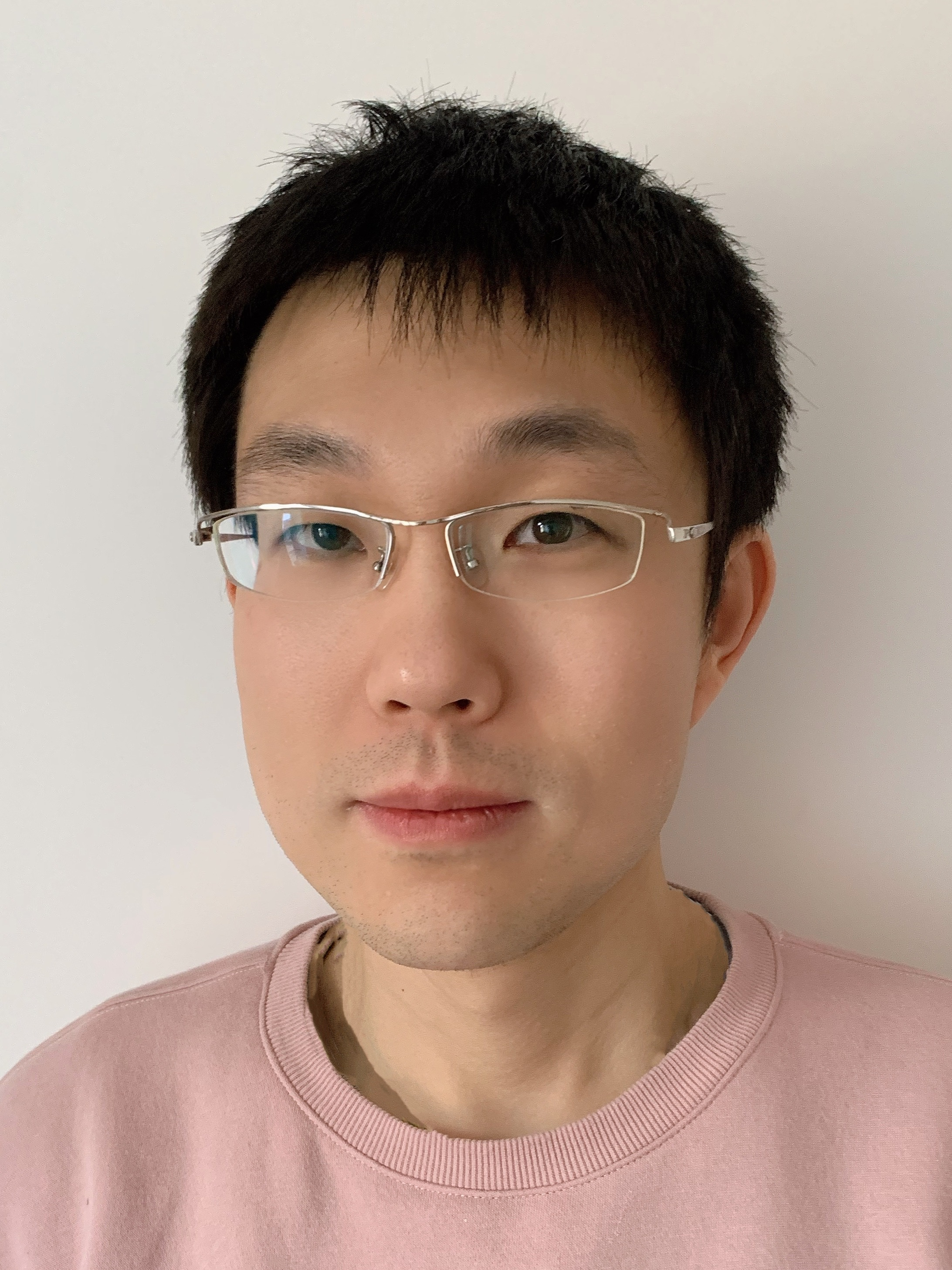
- Sihai Yang in 2021
- Born: Sihai Yang; China
- Education: Peking University (BSc.); University of Nottingham (PhD)
- Known for: Metal Organic Frameworks (MOFs)
- Awards: Harrison Meldola Memorial Prize (2020); CCDC Chemical Crystallography Prize for Younger Scientists (2019); ISIS Neutron & Muon Source Impact Awards (2019); Institute of Physics B T M Willis Prize (2013)
- Scientific career
- Fields: Metal Organic Frameworks (MOFs)
- Workplaces: University of Manchester; University of Nottingham
- Thesis: (2011)
- Doctoral advisor: Martin Schröder

Sihai Yang is a professor in the College of Chemical and Molecular Engineering at Peking University. His research in general is based on Inorganic and Materials Chemistry where he and his group investigate on the design and synthesis of novel Metal Organic Frameworks (MOFs) and zeolites for potential applications in gas adsorption, catalysis and industrial separations.

== Education ==
Sihai Yang completed his Bachelor of Science at Peking University in 2007 and his Doctor of Philosophy degree at University of Nottingham in 2011.

== Research and career ==
After graduating, Yang received an EPSRC PhD+ Fellowship, an Early Career Leverhulme Trust Fellowship in 2011 at The University of Nottingham. He later received the Nottingham Research Fellowship in 2013 and in 2015 moved to The University of Manchester where he currently is at the position of professor.

He develops solid materials for applications in clean-air technology, catalysis, biomass conversion, energy storage, separation and conductivity. His team studies a wide range of porous materials based upon metal-organic frameworks, zeolites, and inorganic materials. The key research interest is to investigate the chemical processes involved in host-guest binding underpinning their materials property using state-of-the-art structural and dynamic studies by synchrotron X-ray diffraction, spectroscopy and neutron scattering, combined with modelling.

Porous materials containing nanosized cavities (1-20 nm), the walls of which are decorated with designed active sites, can form unique functional platforms to study and re-define the chemistry and reactivity of small molecules within the confined space. Research in his group involves design, synthesis and characterisation of the materials, and more importantly, the structural and dynamic studies at National Facilities to understand their materials function at a molecular level. Recent finding includes the discovery of catalytic origins for a range of important biomass conversions, and a series of new metal-organic frameworks showing emerging properties for the clean-up of air pollutants, such as SO2 and NOx.

=== Notable work ===
In 2018, Yang led a research with Martin Schröder where they designed a novel robust Metal Organic Framework (MFM - 300(Al)) which exhibited reversible NO_{2} isotherm uptake of 14.1 mmol g^{−1} and also showed the capability to selectively remove low concentrations of NO_{2} (5,000 to < 1 ppm) from gaseous mixtures. The research revealed five types of supramolecular interactions that cooperatively binds both NO_{2} and N_{2}O_{4} molecules within the MFM-300(Al) framework and also showed the coexistence of helical monomer–dimer chains of NO_{2} within the framework which provided an initial understanding of the behavior of guest molecules within porous hosts which may provide further development routes of future NO_{2} capture and conversion technologies.

In 2019, Yang led a further research with Martin Schröder where a novel Metal Organic Framework (MFM - 520) was synthesized which showcased a high adsorption capacity of NO_{2} (4.2 mmol g^{−1}). The framework also showed a high turn over number and treatment of captured NO_{2} in the framework with water led to a quantitative conversion of the captured NO_{2} into HNO_{3} which is an important feedstock for fertilizer production.

=== Awards and nominations ===
- Harrison Meldola Memorial Prize (2020)
- CCDC Chemical Crystallography Prize for Younger Scientists (2019)
- ISIS Neutron & Muon Source Impact Awards (2019)
- Institute of Physics B T M Willis Prize (2013)

=== Major publications ===
- Yang, Sihai; Schröder, Martin; Teat, Simon J.; Ramirez-Cuesta, Anibal J.; McCormick McPherson, Laura J.; Tuna, Floriana; McInnes, Eric J. L.; Sun, Junliang; Sheveleva, Alena M.; Daemen, Luke L.; Cheng, Yongqiang; Zhang, Xinran (2019). "Capture of nitrogen dioxide and conversion to nitric acid in a porous metal–organic framework". Nature Chemistry. 11 (12): 1085–1090. Bibcode:2019NatCh..11.1085L. doi:10.1038/s41557-019-0356-0. OSTI 1580418. PMID 31758160. S2CID 208235639.
- Yang, Sihai; Schröder, Martin; Thomas, K. Mark; Ramirez-Cuesta, Anibal J.; George, Michael W.; Drathen, Christina; Tuna, Floriana; McInnes, Eric J. L.; Sun, Junliang; Sheveleva, Alena M.; Daemen, Luke L.; Cheng, Yongqiang; Davies, Andrew J.; Briggs, Lydia; Godfrey, Harry G. W.; Han, Xue (2018). "Reversible adsorption of nitrogen dioxide within a robust porous metal–organic framework". Nature Materials. 17 (8): 691–696. Bibcode:2018NatMa..17..691H. doi:10.1038/s41563-018-0104-7. PMID 29891889. S2CID 48352557.
- Yang, Sihai; Schröder, Martin; Manuel, Pascal; Ramirez-Cuesta, Anibal J.; Callear, Samantha K.; Garcia-Sakai, Victoria; Campbell, Stuard I.; Newby, Ruby; Tang, Chiu C. (2015). "Supramolecular binding and separation of hydrocarbons within a functionalized porous metal–organic framework". Nature Chemistry. 7 (2): 121–129. Bibcode:2015NatCh...7..121Y. doi:10.1038/nchem.2114. PMID 25615665.
- Yang, Sihai; Schröder, Martin; Lin, Xiang; Lewis, William; Bichoutskaia, Elena; Suyetin, Mikhail; Parker, Julia E.; Tang, Chiu C.; Allan, David R.; Rizkallah, Pierre J.; Hubberstey, Peter; Champness, Neil R.; Thomas, K. Mark; Blake, Alexander (2012). "A partially interpenetrated metal–organic framework for selective hysteretic sorption of carbon dioxide". Nature Materials. 11 (8): 710–716. Bibcode:2012NatMa..11..710Y. doi:10.1038/nmat3343. PMID 22660661.
- Yang, Sihai; Schröder, Martin; Thomas, K. Mark; Ramirez-Cuesta, Anibal J.; Callear, Samantha K.; David, William I. F.; Anderson, Daniel P.; Newby, Ruby; Sun, Junliang; Blake, Alexander; Parker, Julia E.; Tang, Chiu C. (2012). "Selectivity and direct visualization of carbon dioxide and sulfur dioxide in a decorated porous host". Nature Chemistry. 4 (11): 887–894. Bibcode:2012NatCh...4..887Y. doi:10.1038/nchem.1457. PMID 23089862.
