= Eva Hevia =

Professor of Organometallic Chemistry (born 1976)

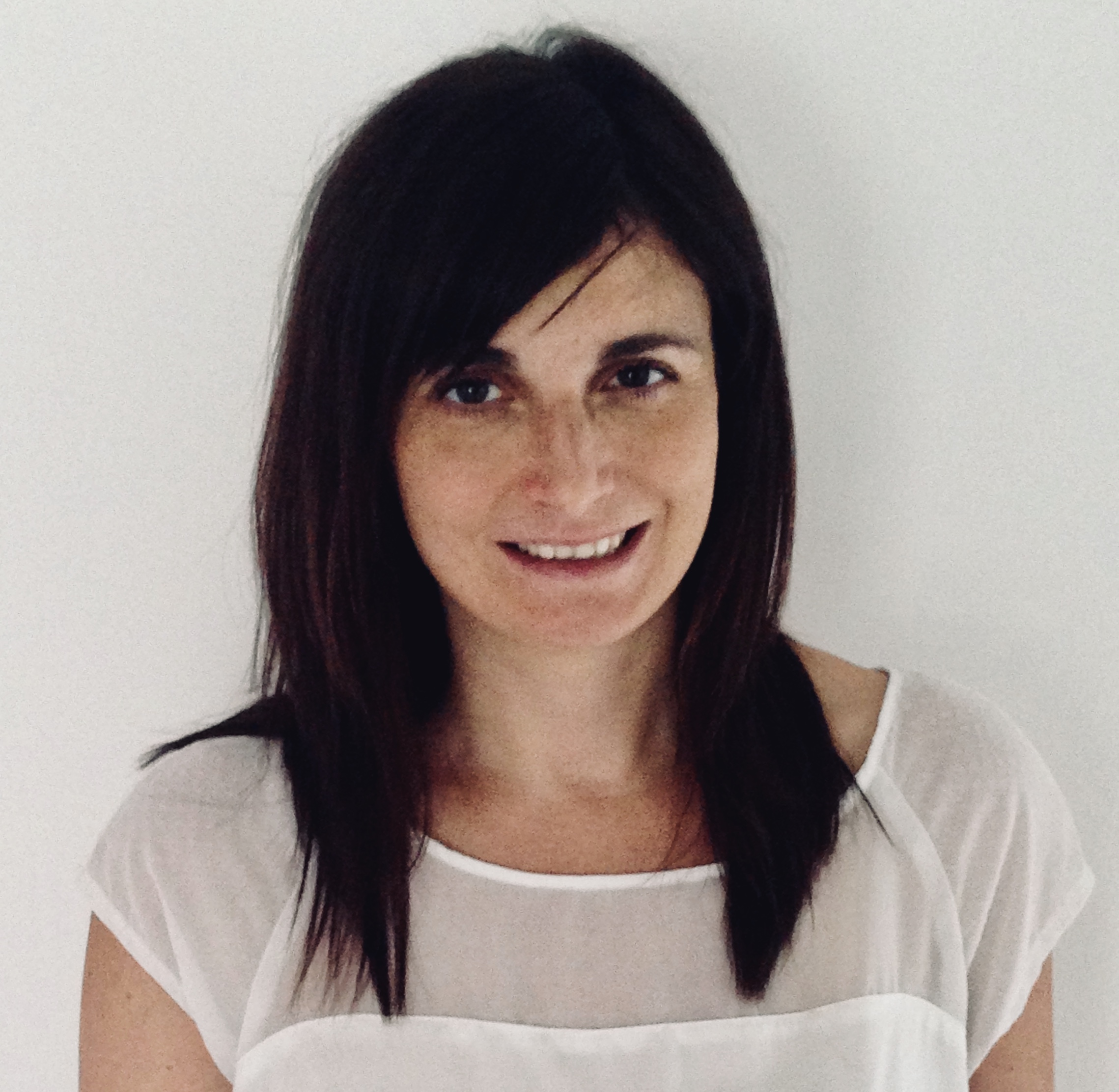
- Professor Eva Hevia
- Born: 1976 (age 49–50); Gijón, Spain
- Education: Universidad de Oviedo
- Occupation: Professor
- Employer: University of Bern
- Known for: Organometallic Chemistry

Eva Hevia is a Professor of Organometallic Chemistry at the University of Strathclyde, Glasgow and Professor at the Department of Chemistry and Biochemistry, the University of Bern.

== Education ==
Hevia was born in Gijón in 1976. She became interested in a science at a very young age. She earned her Masters and PhD from the University of Oviedo in 2002.

== Research ==
Hevia was appointed a Marie Skłodowska-Curie Fellow at the University of Strathclyde working with Robert Mulvey in 2006. She became Senior Lecturer in 2010 and Reader in 2011. She was appointed Professor at the University of Strathclyde in 2013, when she was only 38 years old. Since February 2019 Eva is a Professor in Inorganic Chemistry at the Department of Chemistry and Biochemistry at the University of Bern.

When receiving the 2016 SRUK Emerging Talent Award, Eva Hevia was named by Professor Morata, who was chair of the Award's scientific committee, as "one of the strongest and most promising researchers in her field at international level."

Hevia's research is in polar organometallic chemistry. Her research group are interested in the development of multicomponent reagents containing earth-abundant metals for synthesis. The chemistry uses the cooperative effects of two metals, which allows of new areas of chemistry based on metal-mediated organic synthesis and building supramolecular structures. These areas include: metallation for chemoselective functionalisation of organic molecules, sensitive anion trapping, deep eutectic solvents and salt supported organometallic reagents and the catalytic applications of cooperative bimetallics. Her recent focus has been on the activation of N-heterocyclic molecules and green chemistry. Her research will have applications in pharmacology and agricultural chemistry, and will have profound implications on the environment.

Hevia has given over a hundred invited talks and lectures worldwide.

== Awards ==
2019 - Sociedad Espanola de Quimica, Premio GEQO a la Excelencia Investigadora

2018 - Fellow of the Royal Society of Edinburgh

2017 - Royal Society of Chemistry Corday-Morgan Prize

2016 - Society of Spanish Researchers Emerging Talent Award

2013 - Elected Member of the Royal Society of Edinburgh Young Academy of Scotland

2011 - Sigma-Aldrich Emerging Investigator Award

2011 - Spanish Royal Society of Chemistry-Sigma-Aldrich Emerging Investigator Award

2009 - Royal Society of Chemistry Harrison Meldola Memorial Medal and Prize

2006 - Royal Society University Research Fellowship
