= Electride =

Ionic compound with electrons as the anion

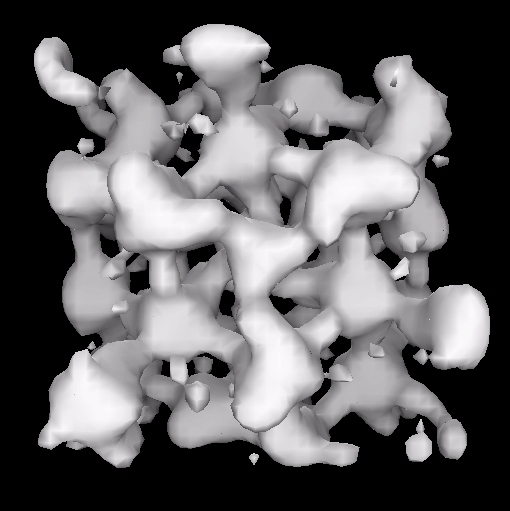
Cavities and channels in an electride

An electride is an ionic compound in which an electron serves the role of the anion.

== Solutions ==
Solutions of alkali metals in ammonia are electride salts. In the case of sodium, these blue solutions consist of [Na(NH_{3})_{6}]^{+} and solvated electrons:

Na + 6 NH_{3} → [Na(NH_{3})_{6}]^{+} + e^{−}

The cation [Na(NH_{3})_{6}]^{+} is an octahedral coordination complex. Despite the name, the electron does not leave the sodium-ammonia complex, but it is transferred from Na to the vacant orbitals of the coordinated ammonia molecules.

Similar solutions exist in hexamethylphosphoramide.

== Solid salts ==
Many "inorganic electrides" have been described.

Addition of a complexant like crown ether or [2.2.2]-cryptand to a solution of [Na(NH_{3})_{6}]^{+}e^{−} affords [Na (crown ether)]^{+}e^{−} or [Na(2,2,2-crypt)]^{+}e^{−}. Evaporation of these solutions yields a blue-black paramagnetic solid with the formula [Na(2,2,2-crypt)]^{+}e^{−}.

Many early crystalline organic electrides decompose above 240 K, whereas the mayenite-derived calcium aluminate electride C12A7:e^{−} is stable at room temperature. The parent oxide 12CaO·7Al_{2}O_{3} has a cage framework that can be represented as [Ca_{24}Al_{28}O_{64}]^{4+}; in the electride, extra-framework oxide ions are replaced by electrons in the cages, giving [Ca_{24}Al_{28}O_{64}]^{4+}(4e^{−}). C12A7:e^{−} has been used as a low-work-function electron donor and as a catalyst support, for example in ruthenium-catalyzed ammonia synthesis. In electride salts, the electron is delocalized between the cations. Properties of these salts have been analyzed.

ThI_{2} and ThI_{3} have also been proposed to be electride compounds. Similarly, CeI_{2}, LaI_{2}, GdI_{2}, and PrI_{2} are all electride salts with a tricationic metal ion.

=== Organometallic electrides ===
Magnesium reduced nickel(II)-bipyridyl (bipy) complex have been labeled organic electrides. An example is [(THF)_{4}Mg_{4}(μ^{2}-bipy)_{4}]^{–}, in which the electride is the singly occupied molecular orbital (SOMO) formed by the Mg-square cluster within the larger complex.

== Reactions ==
Electride salts are powerful reducing agents, as demonstrated by their use in the Birch reduction. Evaporation of these blue solutions affords a mirror of Na metal. If not evaporated, such solutions slowly lose their colour as the electrons reduce ammonia:

2[Na(NH_{3})_{6}]^{+}e^{−} → 2NaNH_{2} + 10NH_{3} + H_{2}

This conversion is catalyzed by various metals. An electride, [Na(NH_{3})_{6}]^{+}e^{−}, is formed as a reaction intermediate.

== High-pressure elements ==
In quantum chemistry, an electride is identified by a maximum of the electron density, characterized by a non-nuclear attractor, a large and negative Laplacian at the critical point, and an electron localization function isosurface close to 1. Electride phases are typically semiconducting or have very low conductivity, usually with a complex optical response. A sodium compound called disodium helide has been created under 113 gigapascals (1.12×10^{6} atm) of pressure. It has been proven that the localized electron density in high-pressure electrides does not correspond to isolated electrons, but that it is generated by the formation of (multicenter) chemical bonds.

The intrinsic polarization between atomic nucleus and the electron anion in these high pressure electrides can lead to unique properties, such as the splitting of the longitudinal and transverse acoustic modes (i.e., LA-TA splitting, an analogue to the LO-TO splitting in ionic compound), the universal but robust gapless surface state in insulating electride that forming a de facto real space topological distribution of charge carriers, and the colossal charge state of some impurities in them.

== Layered electrides (electrenes) ==
Layered electrides or electrenes are single-layer materials consisting of alternating atomically thin two-dimensional layers of electrons and ionized atoms. The first example was Ca_{2}N, in which the charge (+4) of two calcium ions is balanced by the charge of a nitride ion (−3) in the ion layer plus a charge (−1) in the electron layer.

== See also ==
- F-center
