= Neodymium(II) iodide =

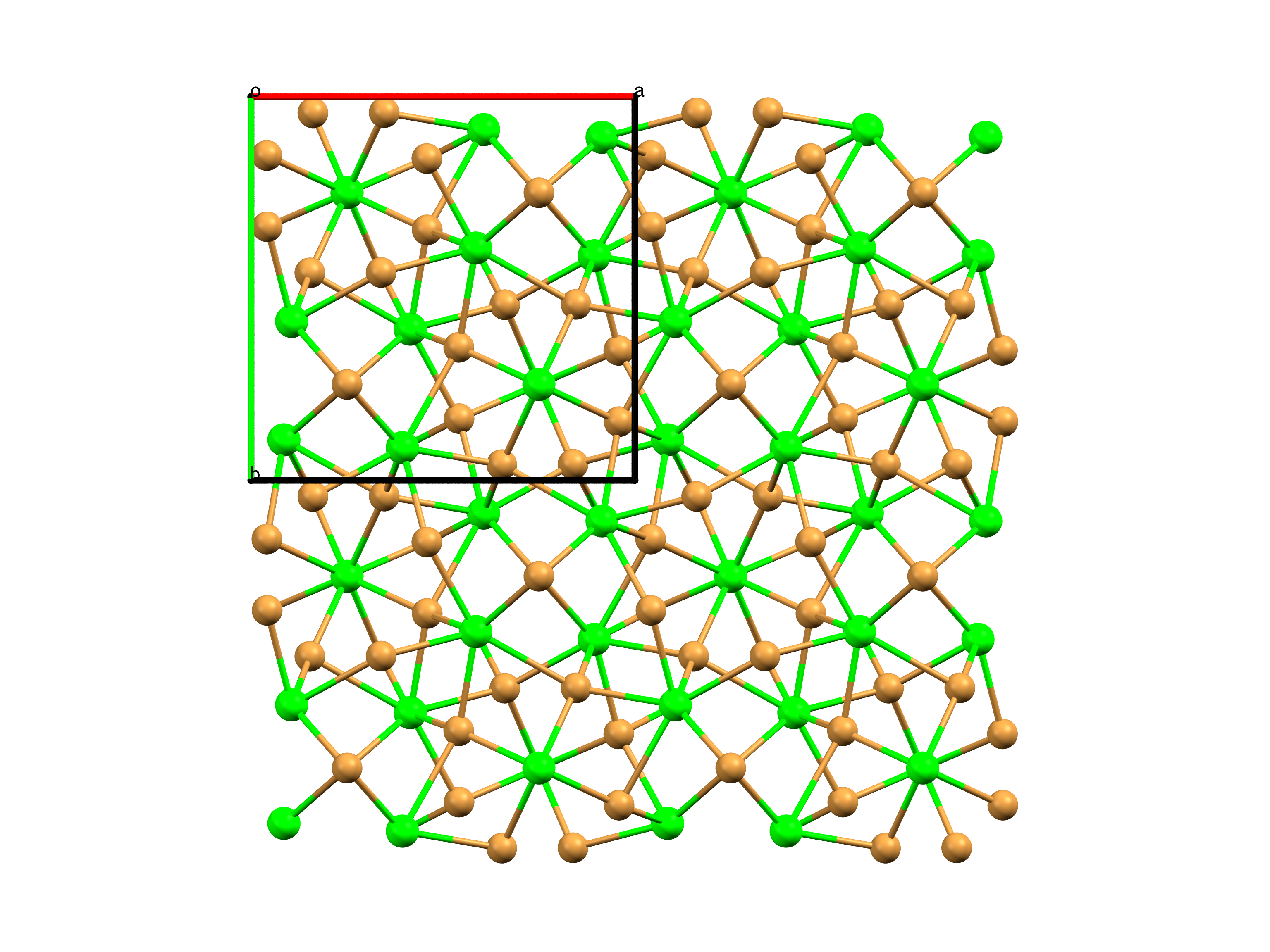

Names
- IUPAC name Diiodoneodymium
- Other names Neodymium diiodide

Identifiers
CAS Number	61393-36-0
3D model (JSmol)	Interactive image
ChemSpider	57269247
ECHA InfoCard	100.150.931
EC Number	622-142-8
CompTox Dashboard (EPA)	DTXSID30722364
- InChI: InChI=1S/2HI.Nd/h2*1H;/p-2 Key: XKFMXEILCPYOQT-UHFFFAOYSA-L
- SMILES: [I-].[I-].[Nd+2]

Properties
Chemical formula	NdI_{2}
Molar mass	398.05
Appearance	dark violet solid

Structure
Crystal structure	SrBr_{2} type (Tetragonal)
Space group	P4/n (No. 85)
Lattice constant	a = 1257.3 pm, c = 765.8 pm
Formula units (Z)	10

Hazards
- GHS labelling
Pictograms	(GHS07: Exclamation mark)
Signal word	Warning
Hazard statements	H315, H317, H319, H335
Precautionary statements	P261, P264, P264+P265, P271, P272, P280, P302+P352, P304+P340, P305+P351+P338, P319, P321, P332+P317, P333+P313, P337+P317, P362+P364, P403+P233, P405, P501

Related compounds
Other anions	Neodymium(II) fluoride, Neodymium(II) chloride, Neodymium(II) bromide
Other cations	lanthanum diiodide, cerium diiodide, praseodymium diiodide, europium diiodide, samarium(II) iodide
- Except where otherwise noted, data are given for materials in their standard state (at 25 °C [77 °F], 100 kPa). Infobox references

Neodymium(II) iodide or neodymium diiodide is an inorganic salt of iodine and neodymium the formula NdI_{2}. Neodymium uses the +2 oxidation state in the compound.

Neodymium(II) iodide is a violet solid. The compound is not stoichiometric. It melts at 562°C.

== Preparation ==
Neodymium(II) iodide can be made by heating molten neodymium(III) iodide with neodymium metal at 800 and 580°C for 12 hours. It can also be obtained by reducing neodymium(III) iodide with neodymium in a vacuum at 800 to 900°C:

Nd + 2NdI_{3} → 3NdI_{2}

The reaction of neodymium with mercury(II) iodide is also possible because neodymium is more reactive than mercury:

Nd + HgI_{2} → NdI_{2} + Hg

Direct preparation from iodine and neodymium is also possible:

Nd + I_{2} → NdI_{2}

The compound was first synthesized by John D. Corbett in 1961.

== Properties ==
Neodymium(II) iodide is a violet solid. The compound is extremely hygroscopic, and can only be stored and handled under carefully dried inert gas or under a high vacuum. In air it converts into hydrates by absorbing moisture, but these are unstable and more or less rapidly transform into oxide iodides with the evolution of hydrogen:

2NdI_{2} + 2H_{2}O → 2NdOI + H_{2}↑ + 2HI

Neodymium(II) iodide is not stoichiometric, and has a formula of closer to NdI_{1.95}. It melts at 562°C. It has a strontium(II) bromide-type crystal structure. Under pressure, this transforms into the molybdenum disilicide structure typically seen in intermetallic compound, which is already present under normal conditions in other rare earth diiodides (e.g. praseodymium(II) iodide and lanthanum(II) iodide). It forms complexes with tetrahydrofuran and other organic compounds.

Neodymium(II) iodide is an electrical insulator.

=== Reactions ===
Neodymium(II) iodide reacts with organohalides by extracting the halogen, resulting in dimers, oligomers or reactions with the solvent.

Solvates are known with tetrahydrofuran and dimethoxyethane: NdI_{2}(THF)_{2} and NdI_{2}(DME)_{2}.

Neodymium(II) iodide reduces hot nitrogen to form an iodide nitride: (NdI_{2})_{3}N which with THF also gives (NdI)_{3}N_{2}.

It reacts with cyclopentadiene in THF to give CpNdI_{2}(THF)_{3}.

== Applications ==
Neodymium(II) iodide can be used as a reducing agent or catalyst in organic chemistry.

== See also ==
- Neodymium(III) iodide
- Lanthanide
