= Thorium(IV) iodide =

Chemical compound

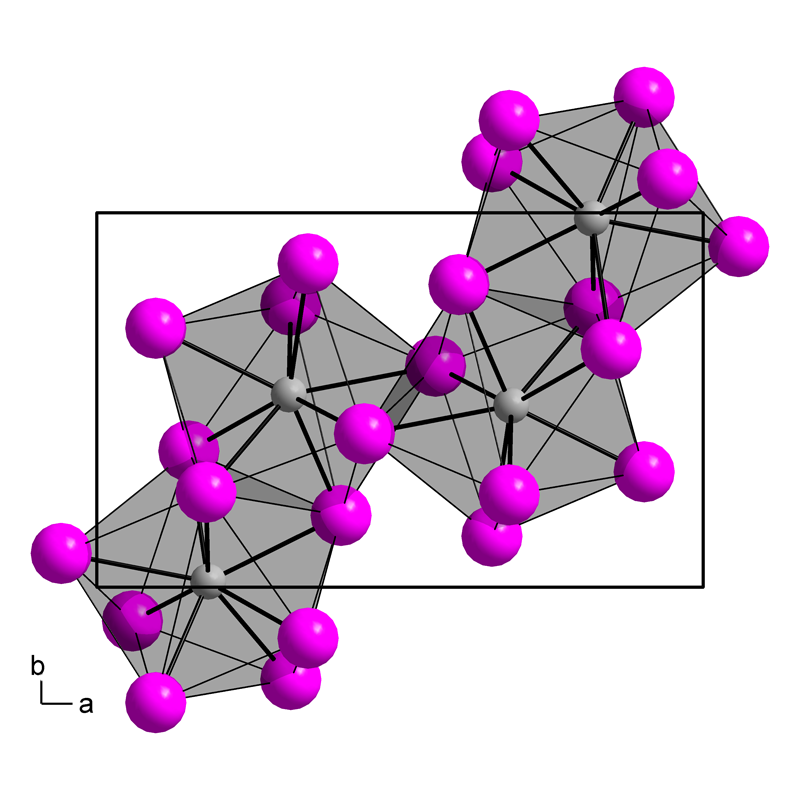

Names
- Other names Thorium tetraiodide

Identifiers
CAS Number	7790-49-0
3D model (JSmol)	Interactive image
ChemSpider	74233
ECHA InfoCard	100.029.283
EC Number	232-211-0
PubChem CID	82256
UNII	Y6WNI235O3
CompTox Dashboard (EPA)	DTXSID90999095
- InChI: InChI=1S/4HI.Th/h4*1H;/q;;;;+4/p-4
- SMILES: [I-].[I-].[I-].[I-].[Th+4]

Properties
Chemical formula	ThI_{4}
Molar mass	739.656 g/mol
Appearance	white-yellow crystals
Density	6 g/cm^{3}, solid
Melting point	570 °C (1,058 °F; 843 K)
Boiling point	837 °C (1,539 °F; 1,110 K)

Structure
Crystal structure	monoclinic
Coordination geometry	8 coordinate square antiprismatic

Thermochemistry
Std enthalpy of formation (Δ_{f}H^{⦵}_{298})	83 J/g
- Except where otherwise noted, data are given for materials in their standard state (at 25 °C [77 °F], 100 kPa). verify (what is ?) Infobox references

Thorium(IV) iodide is an inorganic chemical compound composed of thorium and iodine with the chemical formula ThI_{4}. It is one of three known thorium iodides, the others being ThI_{3} and ThI_{2}.

== Synthesis ==
Thorium(IV) iodide can be made by reacting thorium(IV) carbide or elemental thorium with iodine at 500 °C.

Th + 2 I_{2} + → ThI_{4}

It can also be made from the reaction of Thorium(IV) hydride with hydrogen iodide.

== Properties ==
Thorium(IV) iodide is an extremely air and moisture sensitive solid which exists in the form of crystal platelets that are orange when heated and yellow in the cold. It has a monoclinic crystal structure with the space group P2_{1}/n (space group no. 14, position 2) and the lattice parameters a = 1321.6 pm, b = 806.8 pm, c = 776.6 pm, β = 98.68°. It can also form a decahydrate. It forms complexes with Lewis bases. It reacts with thorium to form thorium(III) iodide and thorium(II) iodide.

== Usage ==
Thorium(IV) iodide is used as an intermediate for the production of high-purity thorium by thermal decomposition of the compound (see Van Arkel-de Boer process)
