= Osmium iodides =

Class of chemical compounds

Osmium iodide refers to compounds of osmium with the formula OsI_{n}. Several have been mentioned in the literature, but only the triiodide has been verified by X-ray crystallography.

== Osmium(I) iodide ==
Osmium(I) iodide is the iodide of osmium with the formula OsI. It is a metallic grey solid produced by the reaction of osmium tetroxide and hydroiodic acid heated in a water bath for 48 hours in a carbon dioxide atmosphere. This compound is amorphous.

== Osmium(II) iodide ==
Osmium(II) iodide is the iodide of osmium with the formula OsI_{2}. It is a black solid produced by the reaction of osmium tetroxide and hydroiodic acid at 250 °C in nitrogen:

$$\ce{OsO4 + HI -> OsI2 + H2O}$$

This compound decomposes in contact with water.

== Osmium(III) iodide ==
Osmium(III) iodide is the iodide of osmium with the formula OsI_{3}. This black solid is produced by heating hexaiodoosmic acid(H_{2}OsI_{6}). This compound is insoluble in water.

== Iodoosmates (IV) ==
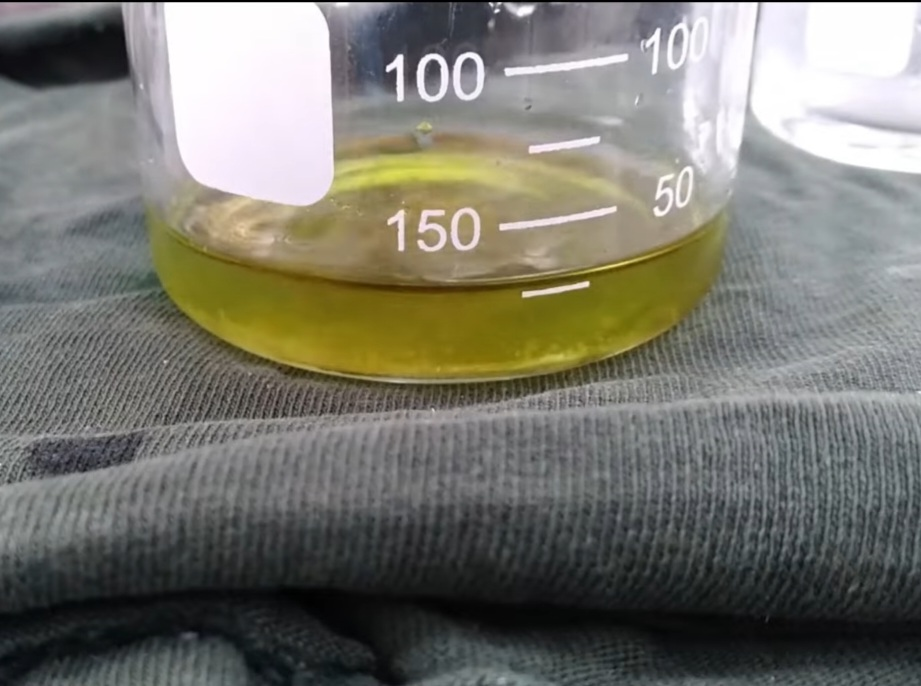
Solution of H[OsI_{5}(H_{2}O)]

What was claimed to be osmium(IV) iodide was produced by the reaction of osmium dioxide and hydroiodic acid. However on attempted reproduction, this substance was found to be hexaiodoosmic acid H_{2}OsI_{6}. When heated this did not form a tetraiodo compound, and instead formed mono, di, and tri-iodo osmium compounds. The ammonium salt, (NH_{4})_{2}OsI_{6}, is known.

When potassium iodide is added to a solution containing osmium tetroxide and hydrochloric acid, a green solution of H[OsI_{5}(H_{2}O)] is obtained, which also contains potassium hexaiodoosmate K_{2}OsI_{6} and a mixed halidoosmate of the type K_{2}OsCl_{x}I_{x}.
