= Titanium(II) iodide =

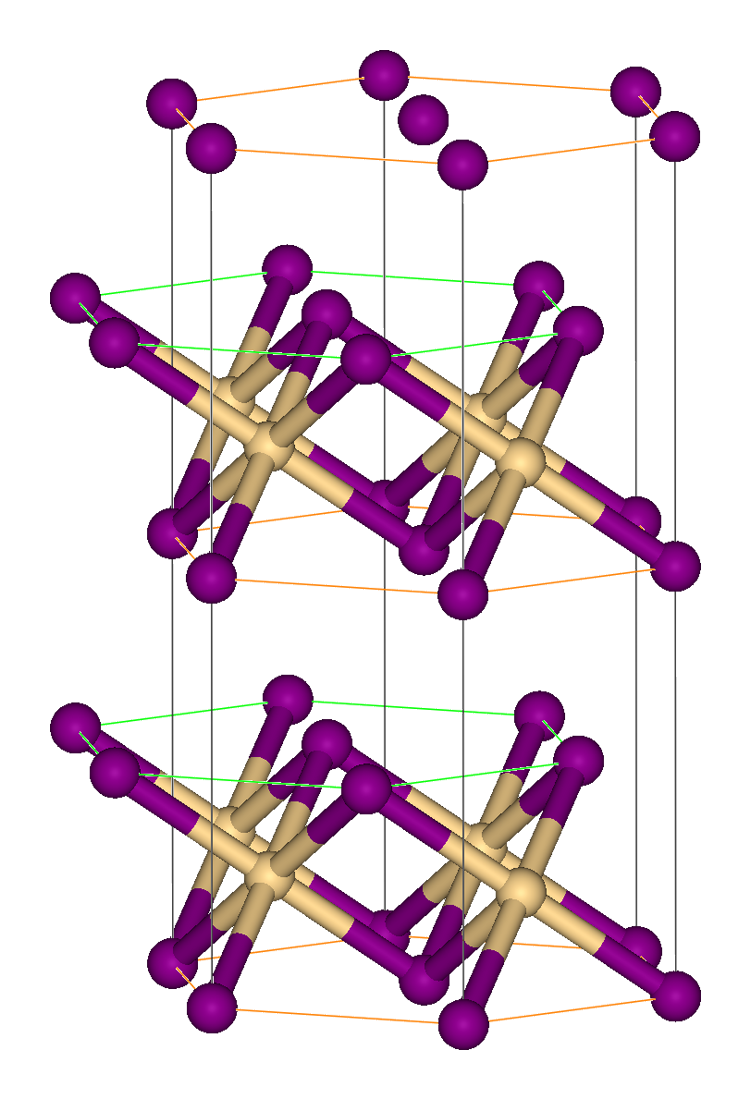

Identifiers
CAS Number	13783-07-8
3D model (JSmol)	Interactive image
ChemSpider	122821
PubChem CID	139268
CompTox Dashboard (EPA)	DTXSID001314595
- InChI: InChI=1S/2HI.Ti/h2*1H;/q;;+2/p-2 Key: XXLOICMXOBKOLH-UHFFFAOYSA-L
- SMILES: [Ti](I)I

Properties
Chemical formula	TiI_{2}
Appearance	black solid
Density	5.2 g/cm^{3}
- Except where otherwise noted, data are given for materials in their standard state (at 25 °C [77 °F], 100 kPa). Infobox references

Titanium(II) iodide is the inorganic compound with the formula TiI_{2}. It is a black micaceous solid. It adopts the cadmium iodide structure, featuring octahedral Ti(II) centers. It arises via the reaction of the elements:

Ti + I_{2} → TiI_{2}

As such, it is an implied intermediate in the van Arkel–de Boer process for the purification of titanium metal.
