= Lanthanum diiodide =

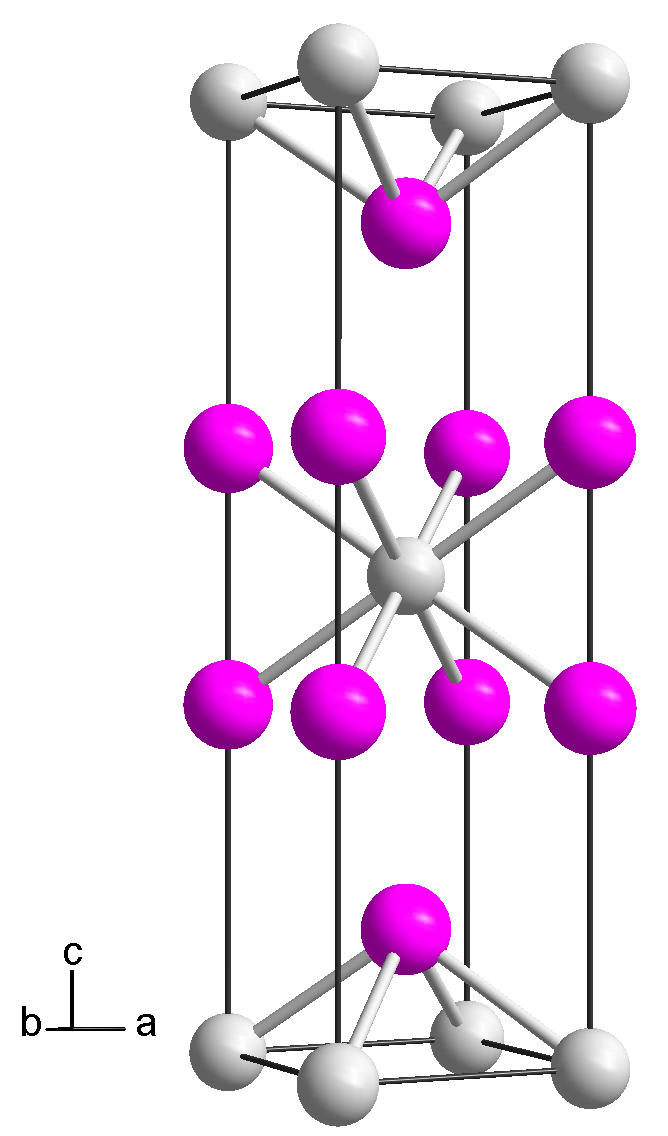

Identifiers
CAS Number	19214-98-3
3D model (JSmol)	Interactive image
- InChI: InChI=1S/La.2HI/h;2*1H/q+2;;/p-2 Key: UYZZZMCZZNTWGP-UHFFFAOYSA-L
- SMILES: [I-].[I-].[La+2]

Properties
Chemical formula	I_{2}La
Molar mass	392.71441 g·mol^{−1}
Appearance	blue-black solid
Density	5.46 g/cm^{−3}
Melting point	830 °C

Related compounds
Other cations	cerium diiodide praseodymium diiodide
Related compounds	lanthanum(III) iodide
- Except where otherwise noted, data are given for materials in their standard state (at 25 °C [77 °F], 100 kPa). Infobox references

Lanthanum diiodide is an iodide of lanthanum, with the chemical formula of LaI_{2}. It is an electride, actually having a chemical formula of La^{3+}[(I^{−})_{2}e^{−}].

== Preparation ==
Lanthanum diiodide can be obtained from the reduction of lanthanum(III) iodide with lanthanum metal under a vacuum at 800 to 900 °C:

La + 2 LaI_{3} → LaI_{2}

It can also be obtained by reacting lanthanum and mercury(II) iodide:

La + HgI_{2} → LaI_{2} + Hg

It was first created by John D. Corbett in 1961.

== Properties ==
Lanthanum diiodide is a blue-black solid with metallic lustre, which is easily hydrolyzed into the iodide oxide. It has a MoSi_{2}-type structure, with the space group I4/mmm (No. 139).
