= Aron Walsh =

Professor of materials design

- Born: Dublin, Ireland
- Education: Trinity College Dublin (BSc) (PhD)
- Known for: Perovskite solar cells, Thermoelectrics
- Scientific career
- Fields: Chemistry, Materials science
- Workplaces: Imperial College London, University of Bath, National Renewable Energy Laboratory

Aron Walsh is a chemist working in the fields of computational chemistry and materials science.

== Early life and education ==
Walsh received his undergraduate degree in computational chemistry and physics from Trinity College Dublin. He went on to complete his PhD in chemistry at the same institution. His postdoctoral research included a Marie Curie Fellowship at University College London and a fellowship at the National Renewable Energy Laboratory in the United States.

== Career ==
Walsh began his academic career as a Royal Society University Research Fellow at the University of Bath, where he went on to become a professor. He is a professor at Imperial College London leading the Materials Design Group.

Walsh has conducted research on solar power and solar cell development. He has also published on stable crystal structures for manufacturing. Walsh's research integrates quantum mechanics with data-driven machine learning and multi-scale modelling approaches. Walsh has served as an associate editor for the Journal of the American Chemical Society (JACS).

As of January 2026, Walsh is the Chief Scientific Officer for CuspAI, a start-up company that uses artificial intelligence to help discover new materials for industrial uses.

== Awards ==
- Harrison-Meldola Memorial Prize (2013) by RSC.
- EU-40 Materials prize (2015) by E-MRS.
- Chem Soc Rev Emerging Investigator Lectureship (2015) by RSC.
- Philip Leverhulme Prize in Chemistry (2016) by the Leverhulme Trust.
- Corday-Morgan Prize (2019) by RSC.

== Selected publications ==
- Protesescu, Loredana; Yakunin, Sergii; Bodnarchuk, Maryna I.; Krieg, Franziska; Caputo, Riccarda; Hendon, Christopher H.; Yang, Ruo Xi; Walsh, Aron; Kovalenko, Maksym V. (2015-06-10). "Nanocrystals of Cesium Lead Halide Perovskites (CsPbX 3 , X = Cl, Br, and I): Novel Optoelectronic Materials Showing Bright Emission with Wide Color Gamut". Nano Letters. 15 (6): 3692–3696. doi:10.1021/nl5048779. ISSN 1530-6984. PMC 4462997. PMID 25633588.
- Butler, Keith T.; Davies, Daniel W.; Cartwright, Hugh; Isayev, Olexandr; Walsh, Aron (2018). "Machine learning for molecular and materials science". Nature. 559 (7715): 547–555. doi:10.1038/s41586-018-0337-2. ISSN 0028-0836.
- Eames, Christopher; Frost, Jarvist M.; Barnes, Piers R. F.; O’Regan, Brian C.; Walsh, Aron; Islam, M. Saiful (2015-06-24). "Ionic transport in hybrid lead iodide perovskite solar cells". Nature Communications. 6 (1). doi:10.1038/ncomms8497. ISSN 2041-1723. PMC 4491179. PMID 26105623.
- Frost, Jarvist M.; Butler, Keith T.; Brivio, Federico; Hendon, Christopher H.; van Schilfgaarde, Mark; Walsh, Aron (2014-05-14). "Atomistic Origins of High-Performance in Hybrid Halide Perovskite Solar Cells". Nano Letters. 14 (5): 2584–2590. doi:10.1021/nl500390f. ISSN 1530-6984. PMC 4022647. PMID 24684284.
- Scanlon, David O.; Dunnill, Charles W.; Buckeridge, John; Shevlin, Stephen A.; Logsdail, Andrew J.; Woodley, Scott M.; Catlow, C. Richard A.; Powell, Michael. J.; Palgrave, Robert G.; Parkin, Ivan P.; Watson, Graeme W.; Keal, Thomas W.; Sherwood, Paul; Walsh, Aron; Sokol, Alexey A. (2013). "Band alignment of rutile and anatase TiO2". Nature Materials. 12 (9): 798–801. doi:10.1038/nmat3697. ISSN 1476-1122.
