= Gadolinium diiodide =

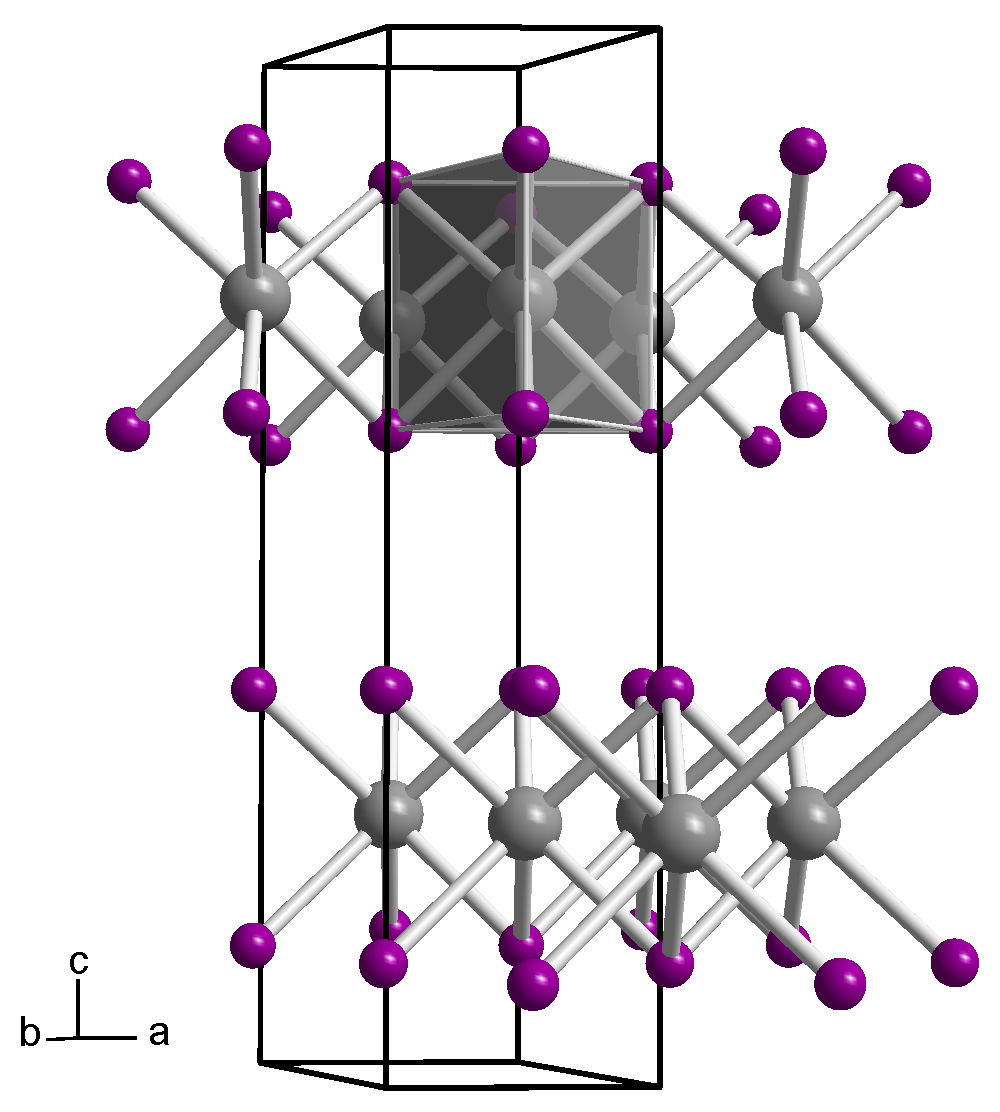

Identifiers
CAS Number	13814-72-7
3D model (JSmol)	Interactive image
PubChem CID	157871709
- InChI: InChI=1S/Gd.2HI/h;2*1H/q+2;;/p-2 Key: DOUOICPRZGCJLL-UHFFFAOYSA-L
- SMILES: [I-].[I-].[Gd+2]

Properties
Chemical formula	GdI_{2}
Molar mass	411.06 g·mol^{−1}
Appearance	bronze solid
- Except where otherwise noted, data are given for materials in their standard state (at 25 °C [77 °F], 100 kPa). Infobox references

Gadolinium diiodide is an inorganic compound, with the chemical formula of GdI_{2}. It is an electride, with the ionic formula of Gd^{3+}(I^{−})_{2}e^{−}, and therefore not a true gadolinium(II) compound. It is ferromagnetic at 276 K with a saturation magnetization of 7.3 B; it exhibits a large negative magnetoresistance (~70%) at 7 T near room temperature. It can be obtained by reacting gadolinium and gadolinium(III) iodide at a high temperature:

Gd + 2 GdI_{3} → 3 GdI_{2}

It can react with hydrogen at high temperature (800 °C) to obtain gadolinium hydrogen iodide (GdI_{2}H_{0.97}).
