= Praseodymium diiodide =

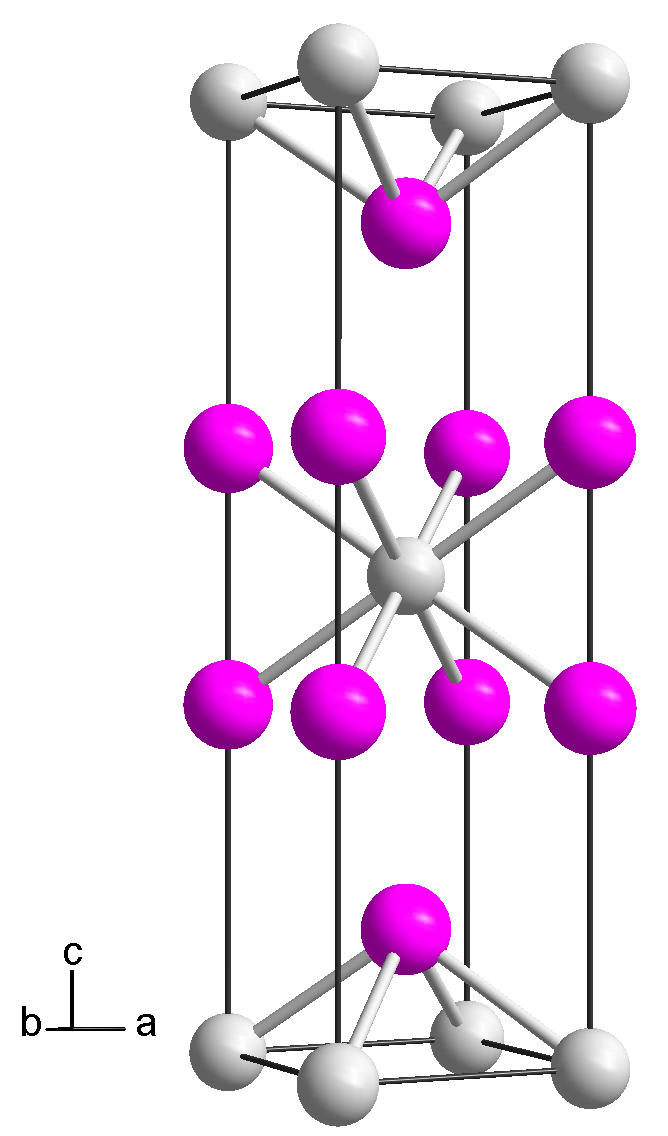

Identifiers
| CAS Number | 65530-47-4 |
| 3D model (JSmol) | Interactive image |
- InChI: InChI=1S/2I.Pr Key: MOULFFIZRHFNND-UHFFFAOYSA-N
- SMILES: [I].[I].[Pr]

Properties
| Chemical formula | I_{2}Pr |
| Molar mass | 394.71660 g·mol^{−1} |
| Appearance | bronze solid |
| Melting point | 758 °C |

Related compounds
| Other cations | Lanthanum(II) iodide Cerium(II) iodide Neodymium(II) iodide |
| Related compounds | Praseodymium(III) iodide |
- Except where otherwise noted, data are given for materials in their standard state (at 25 °C [77 °F], 100 kPa). Infobox references

Praseodymium diiodide is a chemical compound with the empirical formula of PrI_{2}, consisting of praseodymium and iodine. It is an electride, with the ionic formula of Pr^{3+}(I^{−})_{2}e^{−}, and therefore not a true praseodymium(II) compound.

== Preparation ==
Praseodymium diiodide can be obtained by reacting praseodymium(III) iodide with metallic praseodymium at 800 °C to 900 °C in an inert atmosphere:

Pr + 2 PrI_{3} → 3 PrI_{2}

It can also be obtained by reacting praseodymium with mercury(II) iodide where praseodymium displaces mercury:

Pr + HgI_{2} → PrI_{2} + Hg

Praseodymium diiodide was first obtained by John D. Corbett in 1961.

== Properties ==
Praseodymium diiodide is an opaque, bronze-coloured solid with a metallic lustre that is soluble in water. The lustre and very high conductivity can be explained by the formulation {Pr^{III},2I^{−},e^{−}}, with one electron per metal centre delocalised in a conduction band.

The compound is extremely hygroscopic, and can only be stored and handled under carefully dried inert gas or under a high vacuum. In air it converts into hydrates by absorbing moisture, but these are unstable and more or less rapidly transform into oxide iodides with the evolution of hydrogen:

2 PrI_{2} + 2 H_{2}O → 2 PrOI + H_{2}↑ + 2 HI

With water, these processes take place much faster.

Praseodymium diiodide has five crystal structures, namely the MoSi_{2} structure, the hexagonal MoS_{2} structure, the trigonal MoS_{2} structure, the cadmium chloride structure and the spinel structure. Praseodymium diiodide with the cadmium chloride structure belongs to the trigonal crystal system, with the space group R3̅m (No. 166), lattice parameters a = 426.5 pm and c = 2247,1 pm; however, the spinel structure of praseodymium diiodide is cubic, with space group F4̅3 (No. 216), and lattice parameter a = 1239.9 pm.
