= Thorium triiodide =

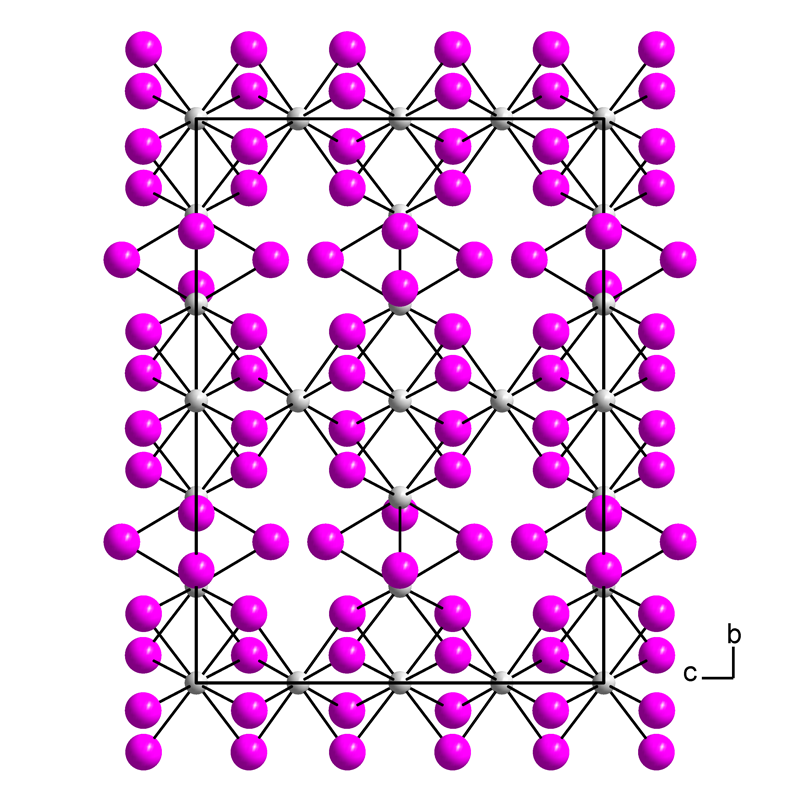

Identifiers
CAS Number	13779-96-9
3D model (JSmol)	Interactive image
PubChem CID	175754991 (charge error)
- InChI: InChI=1S/3HI.Th/h3*1H;/q;;;+3/p-3 Key: DSHBAXKNFMWFAR-UHFFFAOYSA-K
- SMILES: [Th+3].[I-].[I-].[I-]

Properties
Chemical formula	I_{3}Th
Molar mass	612.7511 g·mol^{−1}
Appearance	crystals
Solubility in water	reacts with water

Related compounds
Related compounds	Americium triiodide
- Except where otherwise noted, data are given for materials in their standard state (at 25 °C [77 °F], 100 kPa). Infobox references

Thorium triiodide is a binary inorganic compound of thorium metal and iodine with the chemical formula ThI_{3}.

== Synthesis ==
Th metal is heated with ThI_{4} in a vacuum at 800 °C.

Th + 3ThI_{4} → 4ThI_{3}

== Physical properties ==
Thorium triiodide is a black, violet-tinged, usually poorly crystallized mass. Formed crystals exhibit strong dichroism from violet to olive green under the microscope and are birefringent. Above 550 °C, thorium(III) iodide decomposes to thorium(IV) iodide and thorium(II) iodide. β-thorium(III) iodide has an orthorhombic crystal structure with the space group Cccm (space group no. 66). The α-form has a pseudoorthorhombic crystal structure.

== Chemical properties ==
ThI_{3} reacts with water to form thorium tetraiodide and thorium metal.
