= Brian M. Hoffman =

American chemist

Brian M. Hoffman (born August 7, 1941, in Chicago) is an American bioinorganic and physical chemist.

== Career ==
Hoffman is a graduate of Lane Tech High School in Chicago. He studied chemistry at the University of Chicago receiving a bachelor's degree in 1962 and at Caltech with a PhD in chemistry in 1966 under the direction of Harden M. McConnell. Hoffman was briefly a postdoctoral scholar with Alexander Rich at MIT. In 1967 he started his appointment at Northwestern University, where he has remained throughout his career.

Hoffman was elected to the U.S. National Academy of Sciences in 2006. In 2022, he won the American Institute of Chemists's Gold Medal.

== Research ==
In early work, Hoffman demonstrated the reconstitution of myoglobin with cobalt in place of iron. Over the course of his research career, he also contributed to the study of cytochrome P450, nitric oxide synthase, nickel-iron hydrogenase, and nitrogenase.

Hoffman contributed to the use of electron-nuclear double-resonance (ENDOR) spectroscopy, usually to study enzyme mechanisms.

He has demonstrated that radical SAM enzymes, which are pervasive, operate via the transient formation of an Fe-carbon bond.
