= Cerium diiodide =

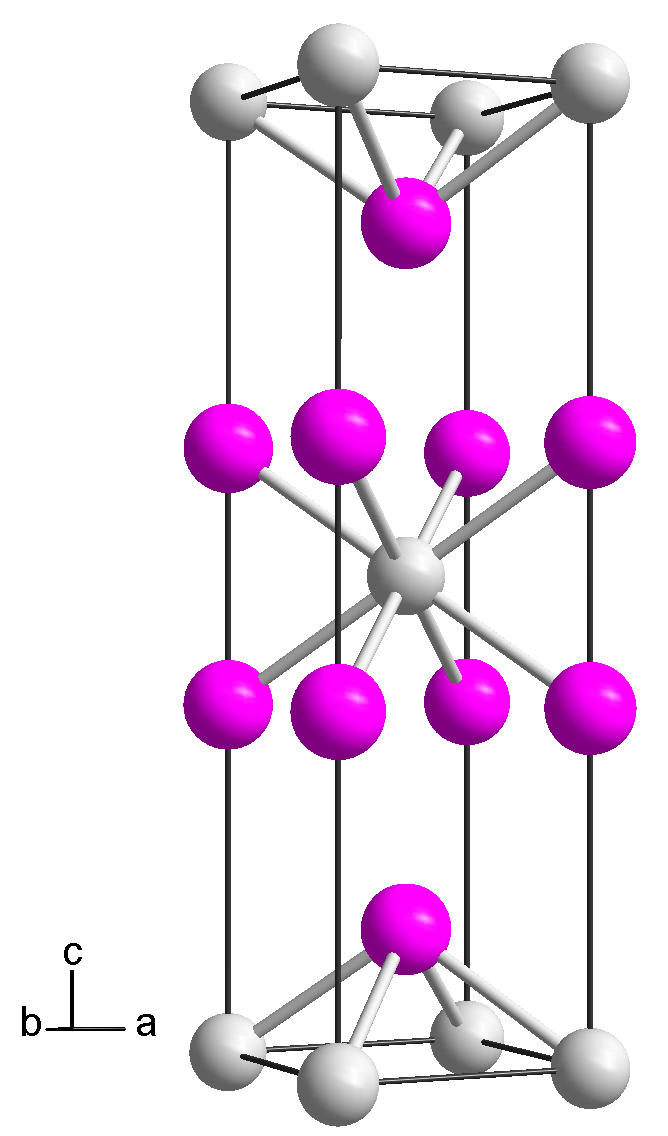

Identifiers
CAS Number	19139-47-0
3D model (JSmol)	Interactive image
- InChI: InChI=1S/Ce.2HI/h;2*1H/q+2;;/p-2 Key: ORCLLRHIKXTOMX-UHFFFAOYSA-L
- SMILES: [I-].[I-].[Ce+2]

Properties
Chemical formula	CeI_{2}
Molar mass	393.925 g·mol^{−1}
Appearance	bronze solid
Melting point	808 °C

Structure
Space group	I4/mmm (No. 139)

Related compounds
Other cations	lanthanum diiodide praseodymium diiodide neodymium(II) iodide
Related compounds	cerium(III) iodide
- Except where otherwise noted, data are given for materials in their standard state (at 25 °C [77 °F], 100 kPa). Infobox references

Cerium diiodide is an iodide of cerium, with the chemical formula of CeI_{2}.

== Preparation ==
Cerium diiodide can be obtained from the reduction of cerium(III) iodide with metallic cerium under vacuum at 800 °C to 900 °C.

Ce + 2 CeI_{3} → CeI_{2}

It can also be formed from the reaction of cerium and ammonium iodide in liquid ammonia at −78 °C. The reaction forms an ammonia complex of cerium diiodide, which decomposes to cerium diiodide under vacuum at 200 °C.

Ce + 2 NH_{4}I → CeI_{2} + 2 NH_{3} + H_{2}

It was first created by John D. Corbett in 1961.

== Properties ==
Cerium diiodide is an opaque dark solid with a metal-like appearance and properties. There is no cerium(II) in cerium diiodide, and its real structure is Ce^{3+}(I^{−})_{2}e^{−}. It is easily hydrolyzed to form the corresponding oxyiodide. Like lanthanum diiodide and praseodymium diiodide, the cerium diiodide forms in the MoSi_{2}-type structure, with space group I4/mmm (No. 139).
