= Warrick Couch =

Australian astronomer (born 1954)

Warrick Couch FAA FRSNZ
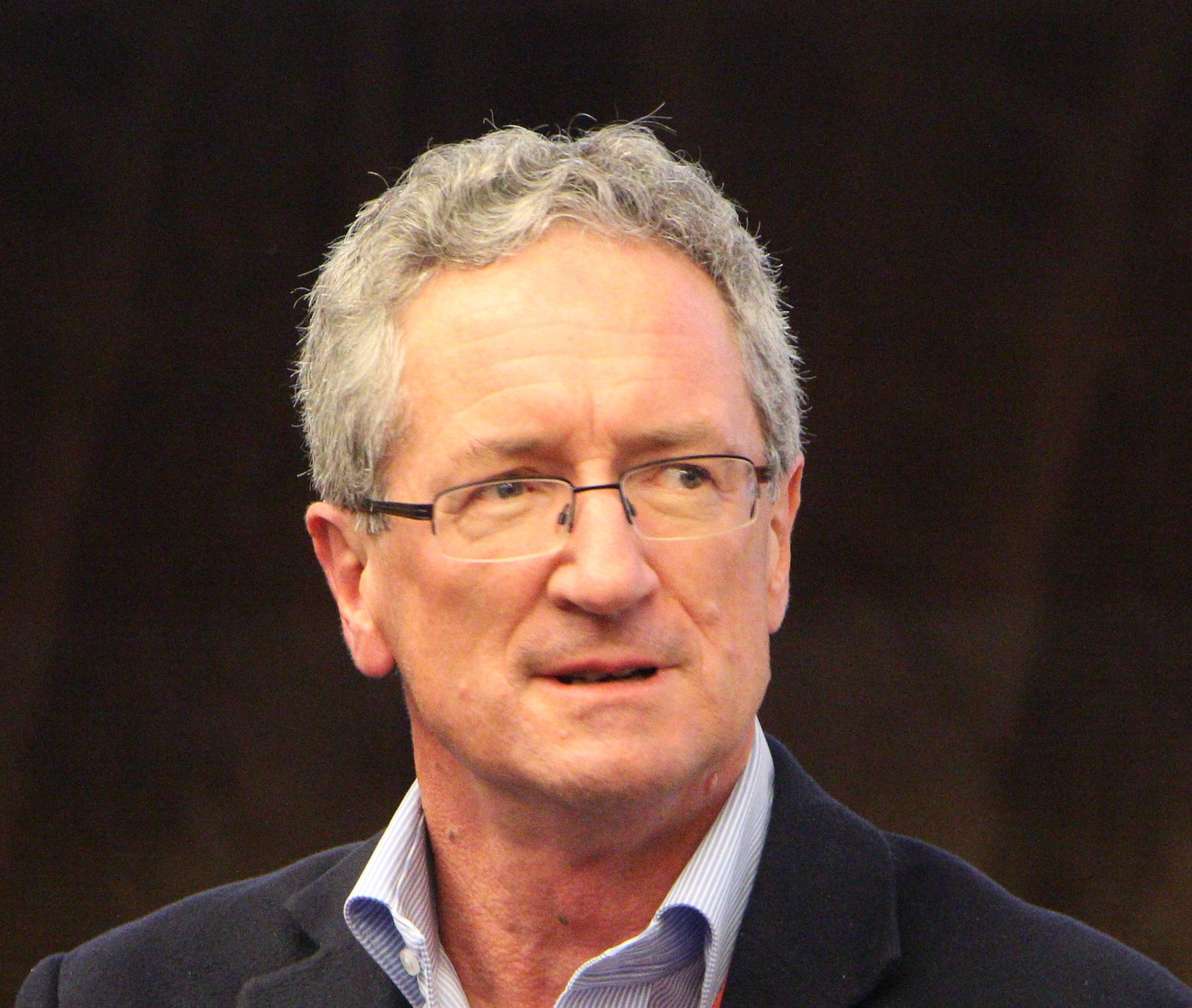
- Warrick Couch at the Astronomy Society of Australia Annual Scientific Meeting in 2014
- Born: 1954 (age 71–72); Lower Hutt, New Zealand
- Education: Victoria University of Wellington; Australian National University
- Spouse: Maryanne (deceased)
- Children: Three
- Scientific career
- Fields: Astronomy
- Workplaces: Swinburne University of Technology, Australian Astronomical Observatory
- Website: astronomy.swin.edu.au/staff/wcouch.html

Warrick John Couch (born 1954) is an Australian professional astronomer. He is a professor at Swinburne University of Technology in Melbourne. He was previously the Director of Australia's largest optical observatory, the Australian Astronomical Observatory (AAO). He was also the president of the Australian Institute of Physics (2015–2017), and a non-executive director on the Board of the Giant Magellan Telescope Organization. He was a founding non-executive director of Astronomy Australia Limited.

His principal research area is the study of how galaxies form and evolve, with a particular focus on the role that their environment plays. This research has involved major observational programs using many of the largest ground-based optical telescopes (Gemini, VLT, AAT, ESO 3.6m, NTT) as well as space-based telescopes (Hubble, Chandra, ROSAT).

Couch is recognized as one of the most highly cited researchers in his field. He was a member of the Supernova Cosmology Project, where his research contributed to the Nobel Prize winning work on the accelerating expansion of the universe, he was a joint winner of the Gruber Prize in Cosmology in 2007 for his role in the discovery of the accelerating universe, and a joint winner of the 2015 Breakthrough Prize in Fundamental Physics which "recognizes major insights into the deepest questions of the Universe". He is a Fellow of the Australian Academy of Science and an Honorary Fellow of the Royal Society of New Zealand.

== Biography ==
=== Early life and studies ===
Couch was born in Lower Hutt, in the Wellington Region on the North Island of New Zealand. His mother was a qualified teacher, and his father was a surveyor with interests in geophysics and astronomy, who later changed his career to become involved in geodetic computing. Describing his childhood in an interview, he said that he "came from a middle class family with lots of books in the house and parents who were very keen on [him] learning to play the piano." He read detective stories and adventure novels, and tinkered with mechanical things including Meccano and wood work. He excelled at mathematics and physics at school, and he developed an interest in astronomy while he attended university.

His undergraduate studies were conducted at Victoria University in Wellington, New Zealand. He received his BSc (Hons, 1st class) in Physics in 1976. He immediately commenced his MSc in astrophysics, graduating in 1977 with his thesis titled: Interpretation of photometry on pulsating stars.

He qualified for a British Commonwealth Scholarship and moved to Canberra, Australia, where he studied for his PhD in astrophysics at the Australian National University's (ANU's) Mount Stromlo and Siding Spring Observatories.

His doctoral research involved a detailed study of the colours of galaxies in distant rich clusters, which led to the first independent confirmation of the Butcher–Oemler Effect – the discovery that rich clusters contained many more blue galaxies in the past (compared to the present day), which at the time was quite controversial. He graduated in 1982 with his thesis titled The colour evolution of galaxies in clusters.

=== Career ===
In 1982, having received his doctorate, Couch moved to the University of Durham in England, where he worked as a postdoctoral fellow in the observational cosmology group. Their main aim was to better understand the physical properties of the stars in distant "blue" cluster galaxies. This involved the development of several key technical innovations to better determine the galaxies' spectral energy distributions, especially the world's first optical fibre multi-object spectrograph on the AAT, which simultaneously gathered high quality spectra for large numbers of these faint galaxies in distant clusters. The results were unexpected: according to Couch, "the galaxies had undergone quite a dramatic star formation event... For some reason the galaxy switched on, formed stars at a great rate for a certain short period of time, and then got cut off."

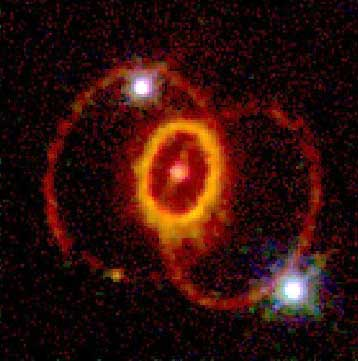
Light echoes from supernova SN1987a (image courtesy of NASA)

In 1985, he returned to Sydney to take up a four-year National Research Fellowship at the Anglo-Australian Observatory (which has since been renamed as the Australian Astronomical Observatory). Over this period the advent of CCD imaging cameras on the AAT, with their greatly superior sensitivity, provided much more detailed information on distant galaxy clusters than was possible with the previous two-colour photographic approach. Couch exploited this opportunity to provide a clear picture of what the different spectral signatures told us about the underlying patterns of star formation activity. In 1987, the brightest supernova in the modern era, SN1987a, exploded. In addition to being heavily involved in taking observations of SN1987A with the powerful suite of spectroscopic instruments on the AAT, Couch also worked with David Malin and David Allen to image and interpret the light echoes emanating from the supernova.

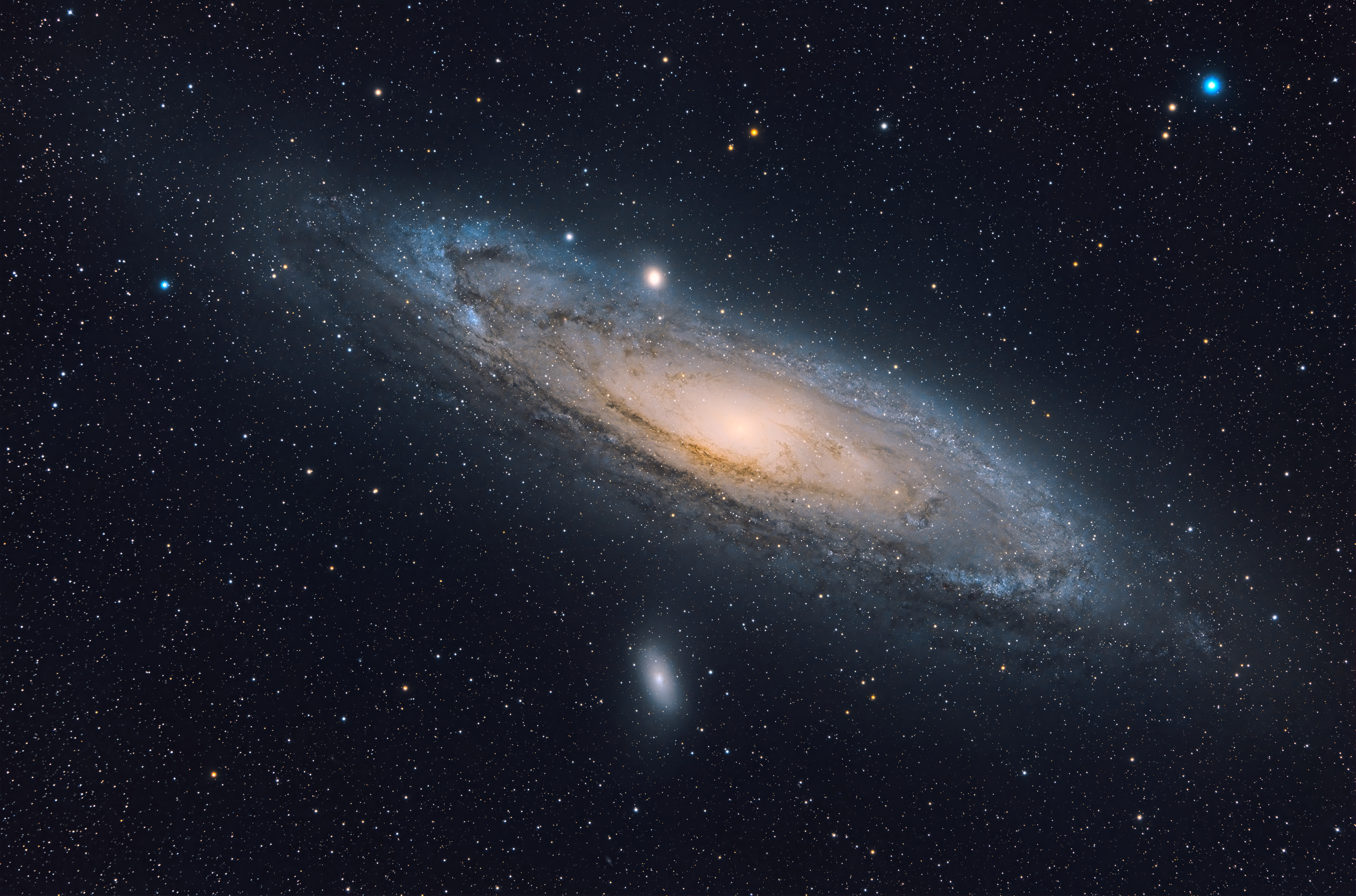
M31 with smaller M32 below, subject of Couch's research into how galactic tides affect galaxy star formation

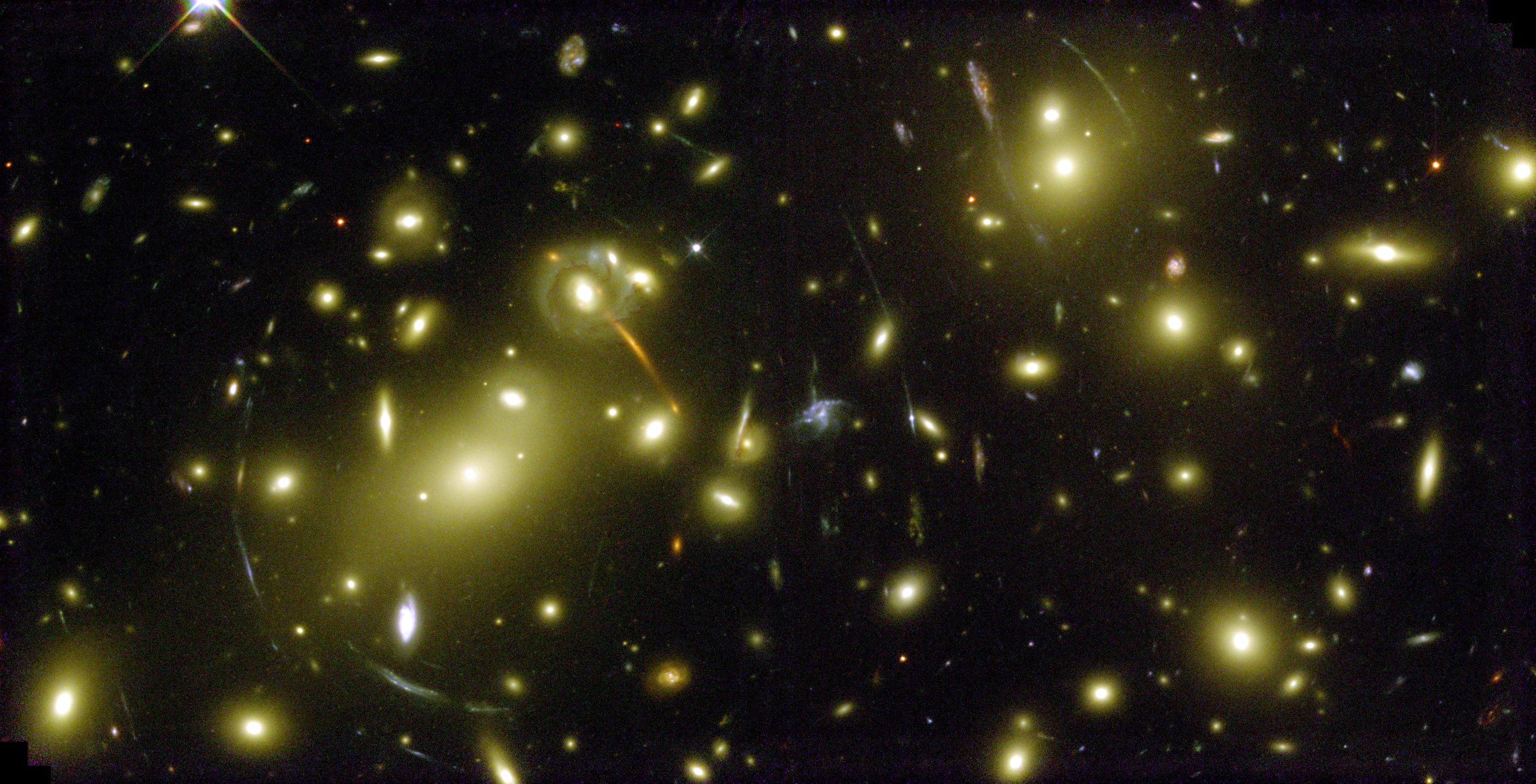
Galaxy cluster Abell 2218, showing over 100 Einstein arcs. Image from Hubble Space Telescope

In 1989 he was appointed as a lecturer in the School of Physics at the University of New South Wales (UNSW). He continued the research programs that he brought from the AAO, and soon after arriving at UNSW he (and collaborators from the AAO and the UK) published the most complete catalogue of distant rich galaxy clusters in the Southern sky, that were at redshifts of at least z=0.5. He progressed quickly through the academic ranks, culminating with his appointment as the Head of the School of Physics in 2005. Some of his best-known research works during this period came from a collaboration with his postdoc Dr Kenji Bekki, whose simulations suggested that the strong galactic tide of the famous Andromeda Galaxy (M31) on its smaller neighbour M32 may well have transformed it from a spiral galaxy into a compact elliptical by stripping away its arms and also triggered a massive star burst in the core, explaining the high density of M32, and in 2003, in collaboration with Michael Drinkwater at the University of Queensland, he announced the discovery of a new type of galaxy, the ultra-compact dwarf (UCD). In 1995, Couch and Richard Ellis published a picture they took using the Hubble Space Telescope of the galaxy cluster Abell 2218, more than two billion light years away, which showed more than one hundred Einstein arcs – curved streaks of light from even more distant sources which are distorted by the gravity of the cluster. The "2dF Galaxy Redshift Survey" conducted on the AAT was unprecedented in scale: it measured the redshifts of 221,496 unique galaxies, allowing researchers to map the large-scale structure of galaxies in unprecedented detail. During his time at UNSW, he built up the Astrophysics Department to place it in the top 1 per cent of the world's space science institutions, at a time when Couch himself accounted for forty per cent of the department's space science citations.

In 2006, Couch took the decision to move to a smaller university, taking up the posts of Distinguished Professor, ARC Professorial Fellow and Director of the Centre for Astrophysics and Supercomputing at Swinburne University of Technology in Melbourne. He explained his motivation for making the change in an interview, saying that "wanting to do things to advance research is very, very difficult in a big university where there are many more groups competing for money". While there, he was instrumental in forging a deal which allowed Swinburne astronomers access to the twin ten-metre Keck telescopes in Hawaii.

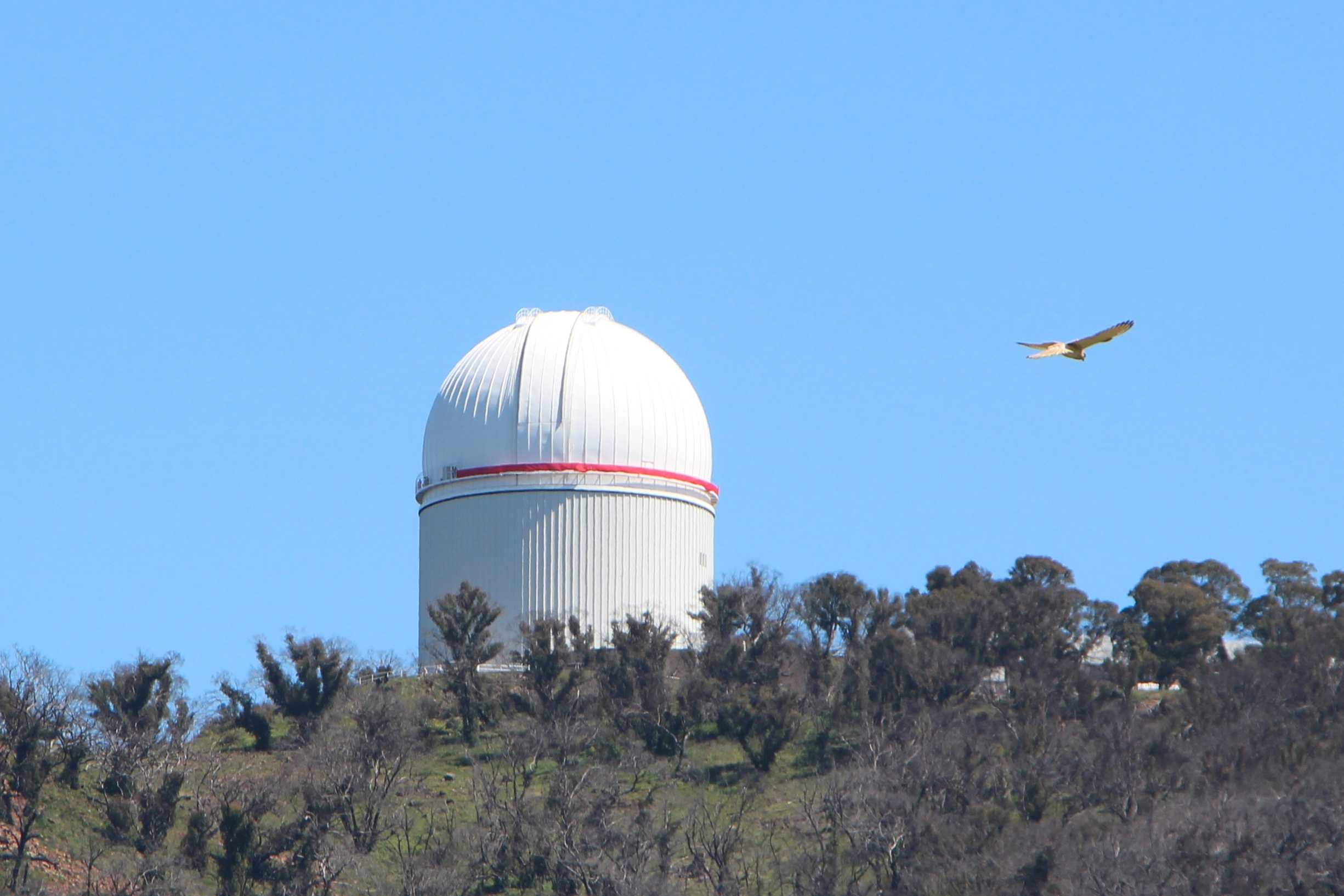
The dome of the Anglo-Australian Telescope, also showing stunted trees recovering from the bushfires which came close to the telescopes in January 2013.

In 2013, he was appointed as Director of the AAO. In announcing the appointment, the Minister for Science and Research, Senator Chris Evans, described Couch as "one of Australia's leading astronomers and cosmologists". The AAO has its headquarters and computing facilities in the Sydney suburb of North Ryde, while the actual telescopes, including the 3.9-metre Anglo-Australian Telescope, are located on Siding Spring Mountain, near the country town of Coonabarabran. One of his most pressing priorities in taking up this role was to assist the Australian National University with the recovery of the Siding Spring Observatory (which hosts the AAO telescopes) following the January 2013 bushfires. While the telescopes and their instrumentation remained intact, several buildings at the Observatory were destroyed by the fires.

In 2018, he took up the position as a professor in the Centre for Astrophysics and Supercomputing at Swinburne University.

=== Research highlights ===
Couch's main area of research interest is to "construct a picture of how galaxies evolve with time, how their properties change, how this change is driven by their environment, and ... to understand how galaxies are organised in the universe". More technically, this means looking at the evolution of galaxies as revealed by spectro-photometric and morphological analysis, particularly in rich galaxy clusters. He also has a strong interest in using large-scale galaxy clustering as an indicator of cosmic structure.

He has had a long association with the Australian Astronomical Observatory, starting in 1985 with a research fellowship, and culminating with his appointment in 2013 as its director. He was the chair of the AAO Advisory Committee from its establishment in 2010 until he became the director, and before that he held the chair of its predecessor, the Anglo-Australian Telescope Board.

His main contribution as a senior member of the 2dF Galaxy Redshift Survey team was to trace star formation rates in galaxies and relate it to their environments.

He was also a lead investigator on the AAOmega "WiggleZ" Project, which provided some of the key evidence showing that the expansion of the universe is accelerating, driven by the previously unknown dark energy. He described the concept thus: "everything – stars and in particular galaxies – is moving away from each other in all directions at a faster rate. Something, which has been called dark energy, is driving that because the most common force that controls motions in the universe, gravity, would cause things to slow down not speed up." The project started in 2006 and ran for four years, taking detailed measurements of 240,000 galaxies and building a three-dimensional map of galaxies. The team of twenty researchers using the 3.9-metre AAT and also working with collaborators in Toronto, Canada and at the California Institute of Technology and the Jet Propulsion Laboratory in the US.

Other noteworthy projects of his include the first attempts to find Type Ia supernovae in clusters at high redshift (i.e. long ago in galaxies that are far, far away) and to use them to determine constraints on cosmological parameters, analysis of data from the Hubble Space Telescope to determine how the development of galaxies are driven by their own character and by the environment that surrounds them, kinematical studies of how globular clusters move around nearby galaxies, and investigations of the nature and formation of the ultra-compact dwarf galaxy populations in rich clusters. His study to determine the morphologies of galaxies in distant clusters, using data from images derived from the pre-refurbished Hubble Space Telescope, was used as the basis for the MORPHS collaboration.

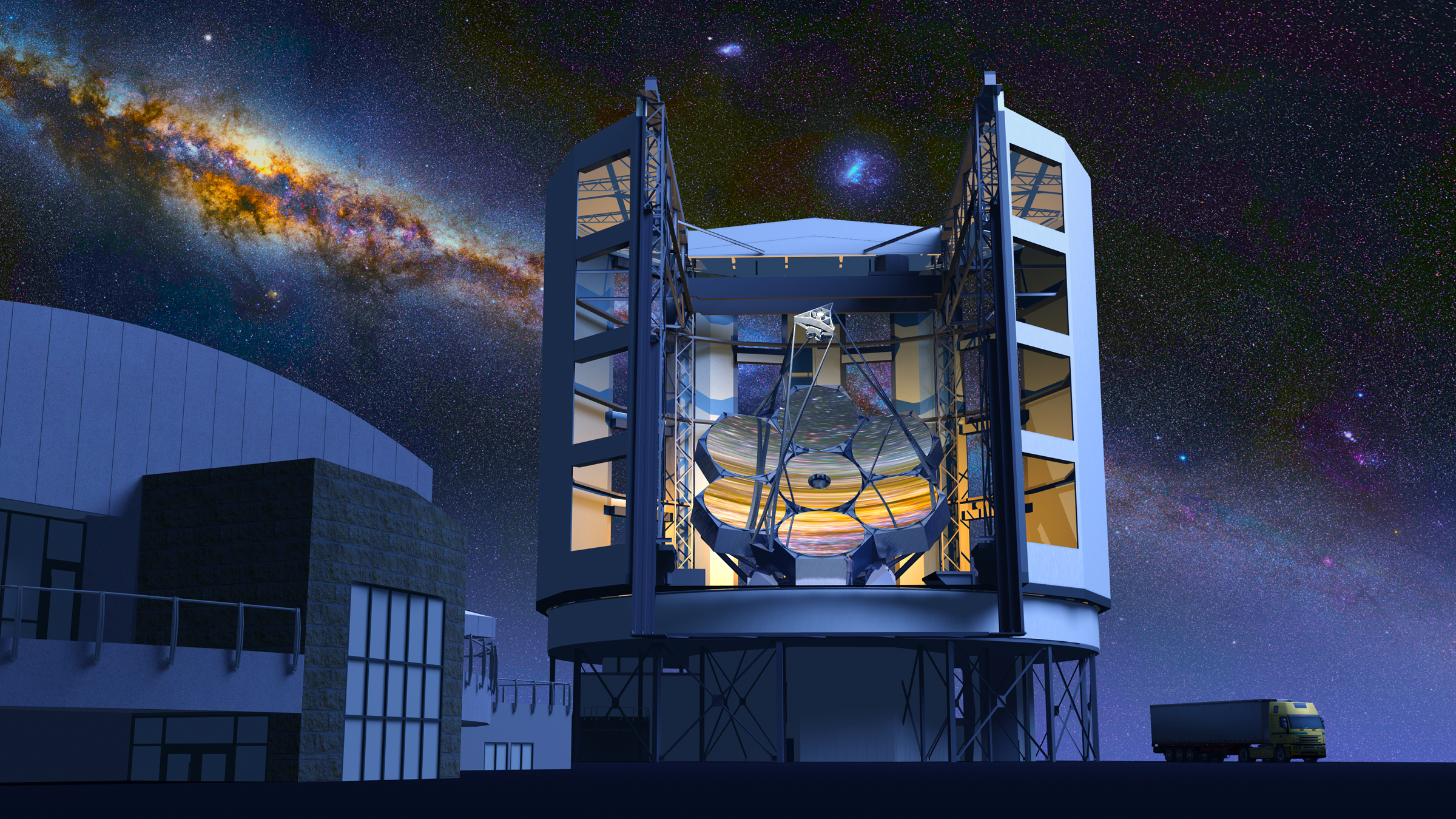
Giant Magellan Telescope, artist's concept

While conducting his own research projects, he also took on a number of senior management roles in large international research collaborations. These included being the Australian Gemini Scientist, Australian ELT Scientist, and Chair of the AAT Board. He currently sits on the board of directors of the Giant Magellan Telescope Organization, a ground-based extremely large telescope planned for completion in 2022, which will consist of seven 8.4 m (27.6 ft) diameter primary segments. Within Australia, he was a founding non-executive director of Astronomy Australia Limited, set up as a peak body to manage funding provided by the Australian government for astronomy research infrastructure, and to represent it in international partnerships.

=== Publications and citations ===
Couch is recognized as one of the most prolific and highly cited researchers in the field of astronomy: As of February 2019, he had published 371 total career publications, 272 of which were published in refereed journals. Cornell University's arXiv has links to 244 of his papers.

As of February 2019, the Astrophysics Data System listed 40,437 citations of his works, giving a Hirsch h‐index of 83. For comparison, Kevin Pimbblet's analysis found that the highest h-index of any Australian astronomer was 77. On the occasion of the award of an honorary Doctor of Science at Victoria University of Wellington, New Zealand in May 2012, the vice-chancellor Professor Pat Walsh highlighted that Couch is in the top ½% of his field as a high-citation researcher. He is a "HiCi" researcher (compiled by selecting those researchers in the field who have the highest number of highly cited papers over a 10-year period) and ISI Citation Laureate (determined by the number of high-impact papers each year and the total number of citations to those high-impact papers) from 1981 to 1998.

=== Personal life ===
Couch met his wife, Maryanne Mooney, while he was a PhD student at ANU. She went on to become Training Manager at the Career Education Association of Victoria; Warrick described her as his "careers guru" and he credited her with making "an enormous contribution to my successful career in astronomy". They have three children: Philip, Jonathan (known as Josh), and Anna. Maryanne died from cancer on 5 April 2014.

When he is not working, he follows cricket and rugby union, especially the New Zealand All Blacks rugby team, and his other interests include music, travel, and home renovation.

== Awards and recognition ==
- 2018 – Elected a Fellow of the Royal Society of New Zealand.
- 2015 – Breakthrough Prize in Fundamental Physics (joint team winner) which "recognizes major insights into the deepest questions of the Universe" for his role in the discovery of the accelerating universe.
- May 2012 – Honorary degree of Doctor of Science, Victoria University of Wellington, New Zealand,
- Member of the Supernova Cosmology Project whose leader, Saul Perlmutter, was awarded the 2011 Nobel Prize in Physics for its discovery of the accelerating universe, and which also contributed to Professor Brian Schmidt's Nobel Prize-winning work on the accelerating expansion of the universe.
- March 2009 – Elected a Fellow of the Australian Academy of Science for his "pivotal contributions to our understanding of the evolution of galaxies in rich clusters and the effects of galaxy environment on their evolution and for his appointment as the primary investigator in an international team that, despite intense competition, secured one of the first allocations of observing time with the Hubble Space Telescope,"
- Awarded an ARC Professorial Fellowship in 2009
- Royal Astronomical Society Group Achievement Award (to 2dFGRS team), April 2008
- 2007 – Gruber Prize in Cosmology (joint team winner) for his role in the discovery of the accelerating universe, September 2007
- May 2004 – Recognised as a "HighlyCited" researcher (Thomson ISI)
- March 2001 – Australian Citation Laureate Award (Thomson ISI)
- May 1976 – British Commonwealth Fellowship Plan Award for postgraduate study

== Key positions held ==
Research

2013–2017	Director, Australian Astronomical Observatory
2011–2013	Director, Centre for Astrophysics & Supercomputing, Swinburne University
2010–2012	Member, Australian Research Council College of Experts
2008–2012	Australian Research Council Professorial Fellow
2005–2007	Australian Extremely Large Telescope Project Scientist
2001–2004	Australian Gemini Scientist
1985–1989	Australian National Research Fellow, Anglo-Australian Observatory
1982–1985	Postdoctoral Research Associate, Physics Department, University of Durham

Academic

2018–	Distinguished Professor, Swinburne University of Technology
2006–2013	Distinguished Professor, Swinburne University of Technology
2005–2006	Head, School of Physics, University of New South Wales
2002–2006	Professor, School of Physics, University of New South Wales
1997–2001	Associate Professor, School of Physics, University of New South Wales
1992–1996	Senior Lecturer, School of Physics, University of New South Wales
1989–1991	Lecturer, School of Physics, University of New South Wales

Service

2015–2017	President, Australian Institute of Physics
2010–2013	Chair, Board of Directors, Astronomy Australia Limited
2010–2012	Chair, Australian Astronomical Observatory Advisory Committee
	Australian representative on the board of directors of the Giant Magellan Telescope
	Vice-president, Australian Institute of Physics
2007–2010	Director, Astronomy Australia Limited
2007–2010	Chair, Anglo-Australian Telescope Board
2007–2009	President of the Astronomical Society of Australia
2005–2009	Vice-chair and Australian representative, Gemini Board of Directors
2003–2005	Chair, International Gemini Science Committee

Editorial boards

2000–2007	Member, Editorial Board, Publications of the Astronomical Society of Australia
1989–1993	Member, Editorial Board, Proceedings of the Astronomical Society of Australia
