= Abell 2111 BCG =

Elliptical galaxy in the constellation Corona Borealis

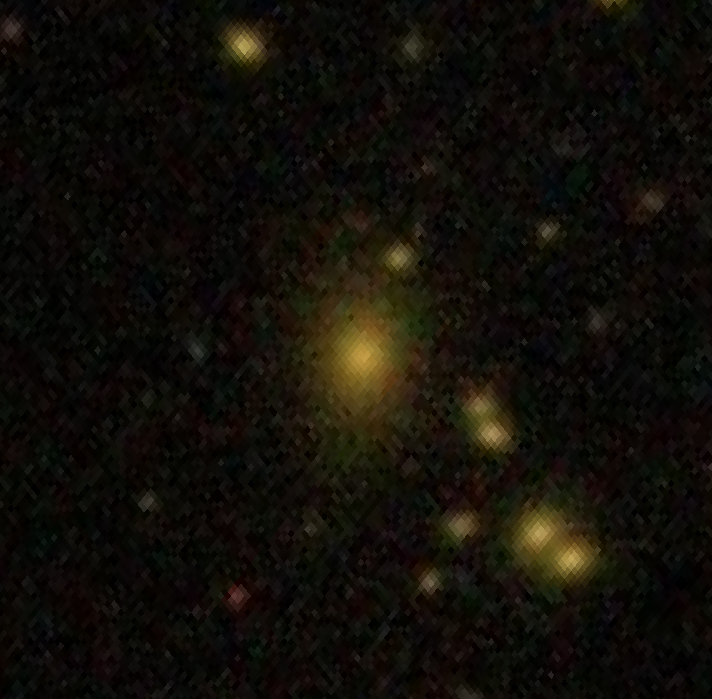
- SDSS image of Abell 2111 BCG

Observation data (J2000.0 epoch)
- Constellation: Corona Borealis
- Right ascension: 15^{h} 39^{m} 40.51^{s}
- Declination: +34° 25′ 26.89″
- Redshift: 0.228001
- Heliocentric radial velocity: 68,353 ± 18 km/s
- Distance: 3,306.1 ± 231.4 Mly (1,013.67 ± 70.96 Mpc)
- Group or cluster: Abell 2111
- magnitude (J): 14.96

Characteristics
- Type: E;BrClG
- Size: ~494,000 ly (151.6 kpc) (estimated)

Other designations
- 2MASX J15394049+3425276, Abell 2111:[BHB2008] BCG, GMBCG J234.91873+34.42424 BCG, PKB2009] 03, LEDA 2048987, SDSS 153940.49+342527.2, WHL J153940.5+342527 BCG

Abell 2111 BCG (Short for Abell 2111 Brightest Cluster Galaxy) is a massive elliptical galaxy residing as the brightest cluster galaxy of Abell 2111, a rich Butcher-Oemler galaxy cluster, located in the constellation of Corona Borealis. The redshift of the galaxy is estimated to be (z) 0.228.

== Description ==
Abell 2111 BCG is an elliptical galaxy. The Gunn-r absolute magnitude for this galaxy is estimated to be -22.67 and the effective surface brightness of its bulge is 22.02 magnitude per square arcsecond, with the effective radius of the bulge being 0.992 arcseconds. The position angles of both the bulge and disk are 174.27° and 41.05° respectively.

The total ultraviolet star formation for the BCG is estimated to be 2.17 M_{☉} per year, while the total stellar mass is 0.39 × 10^{12} M_{☉}. The core of the BCG has a red color appearance based on its inner color profile shape, with the BCG itself having a best fit surface brightness profile parameter profile of 26.42^{+0.56}_{−0.31} kiloparsecs. The stellar population is made up of intermediate aged stars greater than one billion years.

A study published in 2015 found the BCG is a weak radio source, with its radio core displaying a flux density of less than 0.21 mJy in total and less than 0.18 mJy when observed at 10 GHz frequencies. In addition, its optical spectrum also lacks any emission lines. The total radio power is less than 23.55 W Hz^{−1} at 1.4 GHz, while the radio luminosity is less than 21.1 × 10^{38} keV s^{−1} Hz^{−1}.
