= WiggleZ Dark Energy Survey =

Scientific astronomy survey

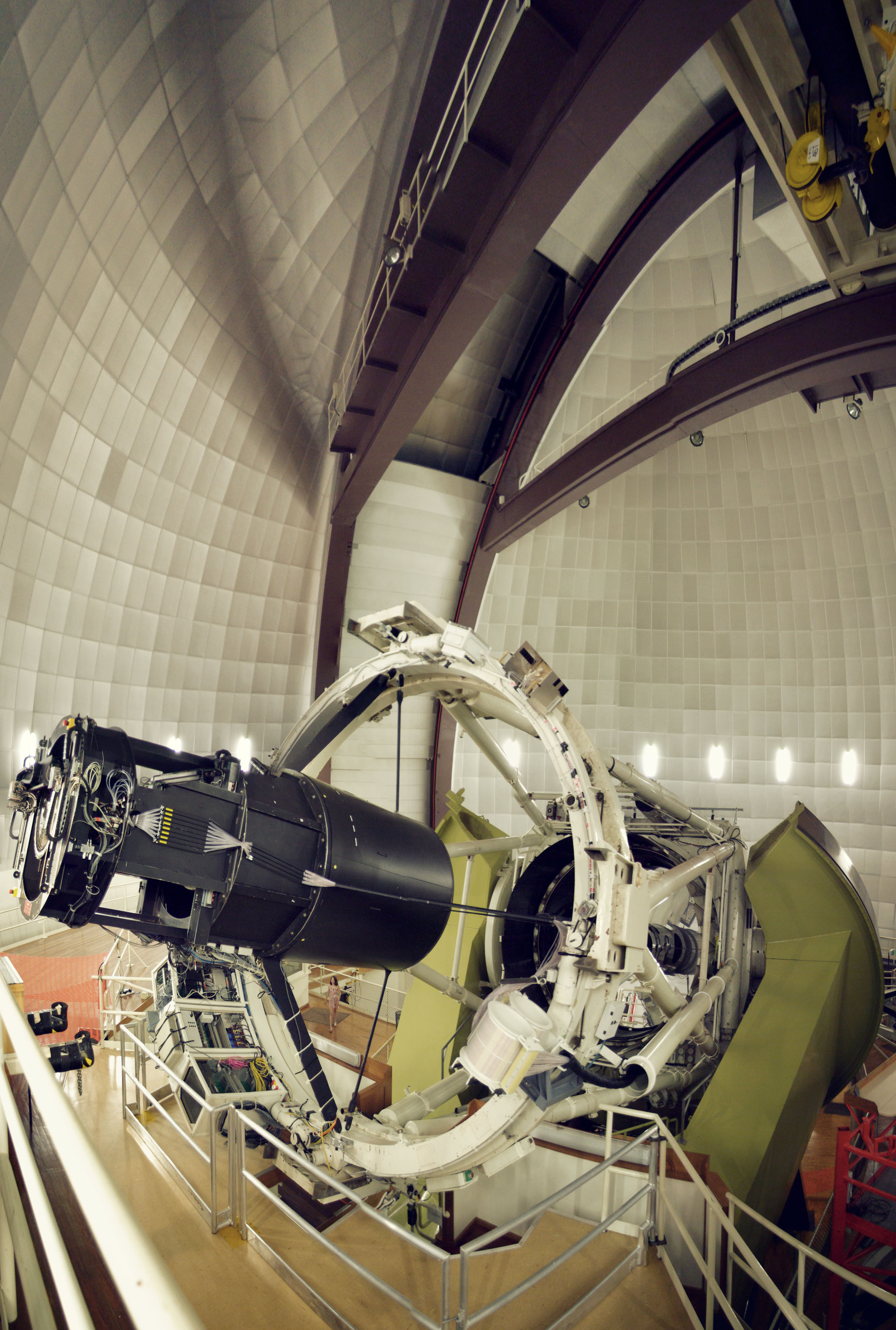
- The Anglo-Australian telescope

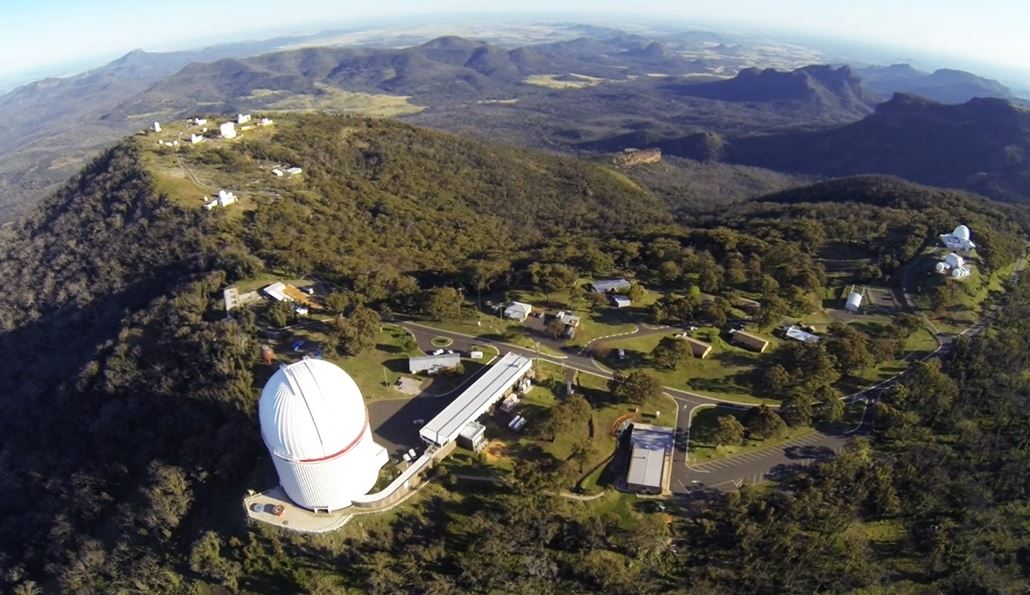
Anglo-Australian telescope, Siding Spring

The WiggleZ Dark Energy Survey is a large-scale astronomical redshift survey that was carried out on the 3.9 metre Anglo-Australian Telescope (AAT) at the Siding Spring Observatory, New South Wales between August 2006 and January 2011. The name stems from the measurement of baryon acoustic oscillations in the distribution of galaxies (“the baryon wiggles”).

The survey measured the redshift of 240,000 galaxies in the Southern sky. Redshift is the increase in the wavelength of light emitted by a galaxy caused by its speed of motion away from an observer on Earth, enabling the distance of the galaxy from Earth to be computed according to Hubble's law. The redshifts were measured using the AAOmega spectrograph, which can simultaneously analyse 392 galaxy spectra using optical fibres controlled by a robot positioner, providing a superior mapping speed. Suitable targets were primarily selected by the orbiting GALEX satellite and to complete the survey required some 160 clear nights of telescope time. The data enabled a three dimensional computer model of the galaxies to be calculated. The large number of observations makes it possible to study variations in the distribution of the galaxies caused by such features as baryon acoustic oscillations.

The work was carried out by a core team of 14 Australia-based astronomers led by Chris Blake and including Sarah Brough, Warrick Couch, Karl Glazebrook, Greg Poole, Tamara Davis, Michael Drinkwater, Russell Jurek, Kevin Pimbblet, Matthew Colless, Rob Sharp, Scott Croom, Michael Pracy, David Woods, Barry Madore, Chris Martin and Ted Wyder. The work was done in conjunction with collaborators in Toronto, Canada and at the California Institute of Technology and Jet Propulsion Laboratory in the United States.

The underlying purpose of the survey was to improve understanding of the phenomenon of "dark energy", proposed as the mechanism for the observed increasing rate of expansion of the universe, contradicting the traditional theories of gravitational attraction. The survey results can be used in conjunction with measurements of Cosmic microwave background (CMB) to provide more accurate estimates of the composition of the universe. The results will also test current theories of gravity by mapping the growth of structure with redshift. Thirdly, detailed analysis of star-formation rates, environments, morphologies and luminosity functions will provide information on galaxy evolution.

The WiggleZ project was succeeded by the Baryon Oscillation Spectroscopic Survey (BOSS) based on the 2.5 metre telescope at Apache Point Observatory, New Mexico and the Dark Energy Survey based on the 4 metre Blanco telescope in Chile.
