= Morphs collaboration =

Research study

The Morphs collaboration was a coordinated study to determine the morphologies of galaxies in distant clusters and to investigate the evolution of galaxies as a function of environment and epoch. Eleven clusters were examined and a detailed ground-based and space-based study was carried out.

The project was begun in 1997 based upon the earlier observations by two groups using data from images derived from the pre-refurbished Hubble Space Telescope. It was a collaboration of Alan Dressler and Augustus Oemler Jr., at Observatory of the Carnegie Institute of Washington, Warrick J. Couch at the University of New South Wales, Richard Ellis at Caltech, Bianca Poggianti at the University of Padua, Amy Barger at the University of Hawaii's Institute for Astronomy, Harvey Butcher at ASTRON, and Ray M. Sharples and Ian Smail at Durham University. Results were published through 2000.

The collaboration sought answers to the differences in the origins of the various galaxy types — elliptical, lenticular, and spiral. The studies found that elliptical galaxies were the oldest and formed from the violent merger of other galaxies about two to three billion years after the Big Bang. Star formation in elliptical galaxies ceased about that time. On the other hand, new stars are still forming in the spiral arms of spiral galaxies. Lenticular galaxies (SO) are intermediate between the first two. They contain structures similar to spiral arms, but devoid of the gas and new stars of the spiral galaxies. Lenticular galaxies are the prevalent form in rich galaxy clusters, which suggests that spirals may be transformed into lenticular galaxies as time progresses. The exact process may be related to high galactic density, or to the total mass in a rich cluster's central core. The Morphs collaboration found that one of the principal mechanisms of this transformation involves the interaction among spiral galaxies, as they fall toward the core of the cluster.

The Inamori Magellan Areal Camera and Spectrograph (IMACS) Cluster Building Survey is the follow-on project to the Morphs collaboration.

== See also ==
- List of astronomical societies
