= Alan Dressler =

American astronomer (born 1948)

Alan Michael Dressler
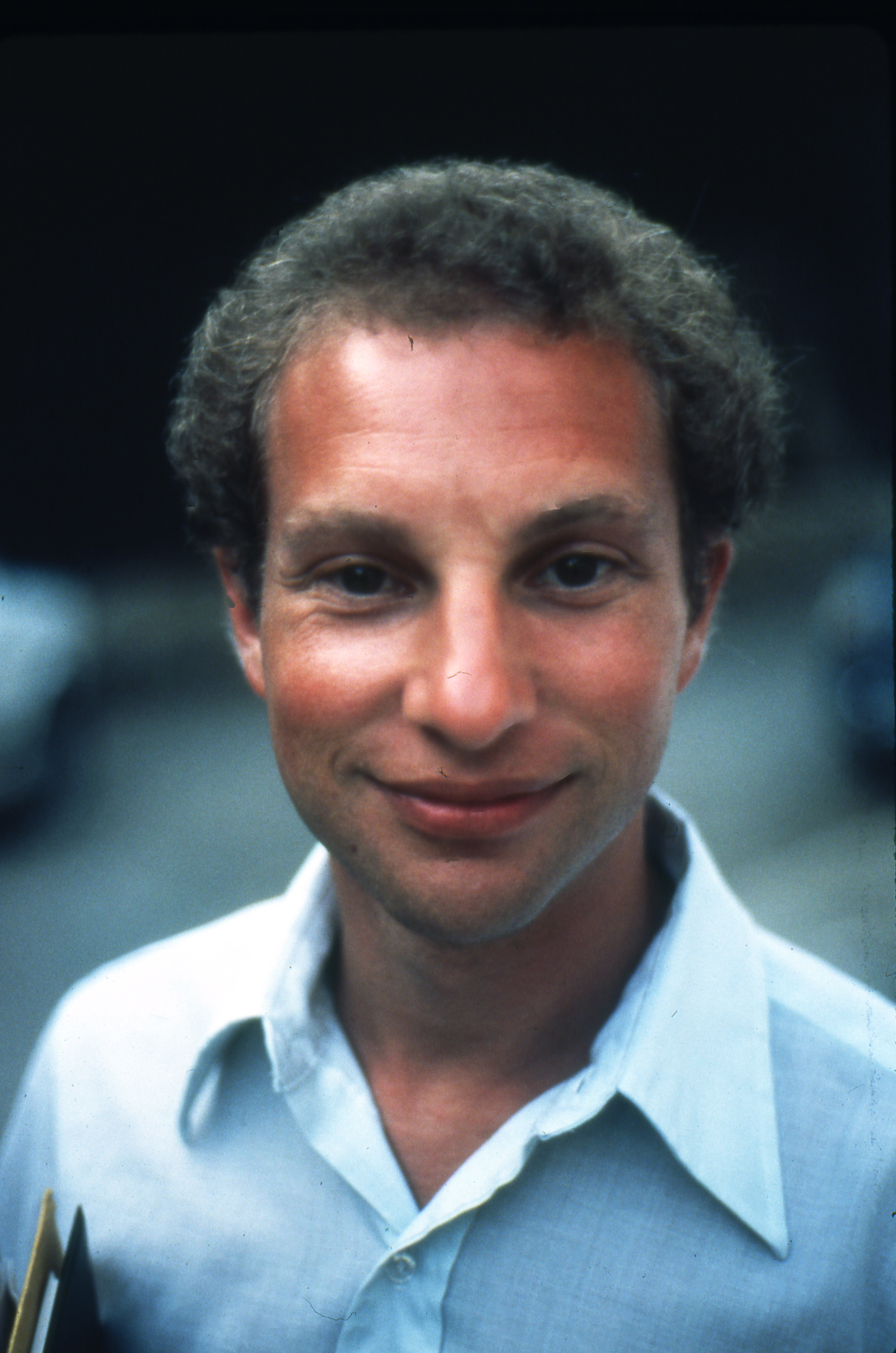
- Dressler in 1982
- Born: March 23, 1948; Cincinnati, Ohio
- Education: University of California, Berkeley; University of California, Santa Cruz (Ph.D.)
- Awards: Newton Lacy Pierce Prize in Astronomy; NASA Public Service Medal; Carl Sagan Memorial Award
- Scientific career
- Fields: Extragalactic astronomy, cosmology
- Workplaces: Carnegie Institution for Science
- Thesis: A comprehensive study of twelve very rich clusters of galaxies (1976)

Alan Michael Dressler (born 23 March 1948) is an American astronomer at the Carnegie Institution for Science of Washington, D.C. Among his works is the popularization Voyage To The Great Attractor: Exploring Intergalactic Space.

Dressler was born in Cincinnati, Ohio, graduated from Walnut Hills High School in 1966, and received his bachelor's degree in physics in 1970 from the University of California, Berkeley and his doctorate in astronomy in 1976 from the University of California, Santa Cruz. His primary professional interests lie in cosmology, birth and evolution of galaxies, astronomical instrumentation, and extragalactic astronomy.

From 1993 to 1995 Dressler chaired the Association of Universities for Research in Astronomy (AURA) committee "HST & Beyond: Exploration and the Search for Origins" that provided NASA with the document "A Vision for Ultraviolet-Optical-Infrared Space Astronomy". He was a member of the Nuker Team and the Morphs collaboration which studied the evolution of spiral galaxies using the Magellan Telescopes and the Hubble Space Telescope. Dressler was chairman of the Origins Subcommittee (OS) for NASA from 2000 to 2003, but declined membership in the Review of Near-Earth Object Surveys and Hazard Mitigation Strategies, Survey/Detection Panel. Dressler is currently working on the Inamori Magellan Areal Camera and Spectrograph (IMACS) Cluster Building Survey which studies the evolution of stellar structures and populations in distant galaxy clusters, which means the events observed took place four to seven billion years ago. He is also a member of the Terrestrial Planet Finder Coronograph Science and technology definition team.

== Awards ==
In 1983 Dressler received the Newton Lacy Pierce Prize in Astronomy from the American Astronomical Society He was elected to the United States National Academy of Sciences in the field of astronomy in 1996. In 1999 he received the Public Service Medal from NASA. In 2017 the AURA "HST and Beyond" Committee, chaired by Dressler, was awarded the Carl Sagan Memorial Award.
