= Bianca Poggianti =

Italian astronomer

Bianca Maria Poggianti (born 4 May 1967) is an Italian astronomer studying the evolution of galaxies and galaxy clusters. Originally from Pisa, she is a director of research for INAF, the Italian National Institute for Astrophysics, associated with the Astronomical Observatory of the University of Padua.

== Education and career ==
Poggianti completed her master's degree in physics at the University of Pisa, graduating in 1991. Then she completed a Ph.D. in astronomy at the University of Padova in 1995.

From 1995 to 1996, Poggianti did her postdoctoral research at the University of Groningen Department of Astronomy. Then later as a research associate for the Institute of Astronomy at the University of Cambridge from 1996 to 1998. Afterward, becoming a researcher at the Astronomical Observatory Padova with INAF until 2016 where she now holds the position of research director and director at INAF.

== Research ==
Poggianti has been a member of the Morphs collaboration, a coordinated study of the shapes and evolution of galaxies in distant clusters. She is known for her research on the correlation between galaxy size and the timing of star formation, and on the effects of the intergalactic medium on the motion of galaxies within clusters. Most recently, she has studied the ram pressure that is believed to strip gasses from galaxies in large clusters, leading to the formation of jellyfish galaxies, the cessation of star formation in the stripped galaxies, and the initiation of active galactic nuclei at the centers of these galaxies.

== Recognition ==
Poggianti is a winner of the Friedrich Wilhelm Bessel Research Award of the Alexander von Humboldt Foundation.
