= Richard Massey =

British astrophysicist

- Born: United Kingdom
- Education: Durham University (MSci); University of Cambridge (PhD)
- Awards: Philip Leverhulme Prize (2011)
- Scientific career
- Fields: Cosmology
- Workplaces: Durham University
- Doctoral advisor: Alexandre Réfrégier and Richard Ellis
- Website: www.astro.dur.ac.uk/~rjm/

Richard Massey (born 14 October 1977) is a British astrophysicist currently working as Royal Society Research Fellow in the Institute for Computational Cosmology at Durham University. Previously he was a senior research fellow in astrophysics at the California Institute of Technology and STFC Advanced Fellow at the Institute for Astronomy of the University of Edinburgh. Massey graduated in Maths and Physics from the University of Durham in 2000 and was a member of Castle. He completed his Ph.D. at Cambridge (Clare College) in 2003, with the thesis Weighing the Universe with Weak Gravitational Lensing.

Massey is best known for his studies of dark matter, including the first 3D map of its large-scale distribution and its behaviour during collisions. He was awarded the 2011 Philip Leverhulme Prize in Astronomy and Astrophysics. He has featured in several TV documentaries, including BBC's Horizon documentary "How Big is the Universe?" in 2013 and online.
