= Harvey Raymond Butcher =

American astronomer

Harvey Butcher

4th President of the European Astronomical Society
- In office 2001–2006
- Preceded by: Jean-Paul Zahn
- Succeeded by: Joachim Krautter

Personal details
- Born: August 3, 1947 (age 79)
- Scientific career
- Education: California Institute of Technology (B.Sc.); Australian National University (Ph.D.)
- Known for: Galaxy evolution; Stellar abundances; Astronomical Instrumentation; Low Frequency Radio Astronomy; Butcher-Oemler Effect
- Fields: Astrophysics
- Workplaces: Australian National University
- Doctoral advisor: Michael Bessell

Harvey Raymond Butcher III is an astronomer who has made significant contributions in observational astronomy and instrumentation which have advanced understanding of the formation of stars and of the universe. He received a B.Sc. in Astrophysics from the California Institute of Technology in 1969, where he contributed to the development of advanced infrared spectrometry applied in the first survey of the sky at infrared wavelengths (the Two Micron Sky Survey project).

== Career ==
Butcher received his PhD from the Australian National University in 1974 for research involving the construction of one of the first high resolution echelle spectrographs in astronomy and its application to elucidating the abundances of R- and S-process chemical elements in dwarf stars of widely differing ages and mean abundance levels.

He continued his focus on developing instrumentation to solve observational problems in cosmology as the Bart J. Bok Fellow at the Steward Observatory of the University of Arizona from 1974 to 1976, where he characterized anomalous abundances in extreme halo stars and pioneered the application of the then new 2D (digital TV) vidicon systems and early CCD detectors for photometry of faint stars and galaxies.

From 1976 to 1983, he held the position of Astronomer at the Kitt Peak National Observatory, Tucson, Arizona, where he spearheaded the technique of multi-aperture spectroscopy for observing very faint, high redshift galaxies, and was project scientist for several new observing instruments, including an early speckle spectrograph for obtaining spatially resolved spectra at resolutions approaching the diffraction limit. In 1978, along with Augustus Oemler, Jr., he discovered that rich galaxy clusters at large distances (z>0.2) have an excess of galaxies with blue colors when compared to similar nearby low redshift clusters. This is now known as the Butcher–Oemler Effect.

In 1983, he accepted the position of Professor of Observational Astronomy at the University of Groningen and Director of the Kapteyn Observatory in the Netherlands. His research focused on galaxy evolution, taking advantage of both the Hubble Space Telescope and ground-based systems, and of a stellar seismometer developed by his team based on a stabilized Fabry–Pérot interferometer.

From 1991 until 2007 he served as Director of the Netherlands Foundation for Research in Astronomy (ASTRON), the Netherlands' national astronomical organization. He oversaw Dutch contributions to innovative instrumentation for astronomy around the world and for the future James Webb Space Telescope. He worked on the Morphs collaboration studying the formation and morphologies of distant galaxies. Butcher supported the global Square Kilometre Array radio telescope project. He led the funding efforts and interdisciplinary development of LOFAR, for which he was awarded a knighthood in the Order of the Netherlands Lion. LOFAR is an innovative low-frequency radio telescope that has the potential to look back in time to the early epoch of the Universe just after the Big Bang when the first luminous objects were forming.

Since September 2007, Professor Butcher has been the Director the Research School of Astronomy and Astrophysics at the Australian National University, Canberra.

Butcher became a member of the Royal Netherlands Academy of Arts and Sciences in 2007.
