= Butcher–Oemler Effect =

The Butcher–Oemler Effect is a scientific hypothesis suggesting the cores of galaxy clusters at intermediate redshift (z ~ 0.3) contain a larger fraction of blue galaxies than do the cores of low redshift clusters. The claim was first put forward by Harvey Butcher and Augustus Oemler in a 1978 Astrophysical Journal paper.

The original Butcher–Oemler paper presents photometry of two clusters of galaxies, Cl 0024+1654 at z = 0.39 and 3C 295 at z = 0.46, both typical in their morphology and richness. Like the nearby Coma Cluster, they are rich and centrally concentrated in their galaxies. Butcher and Oemler found that in the cores of these distant clusters, more blue galaxies were observed than are observed in the cores of nearby clusters (of similar richness and morphology).

Cluster galaxy "blueness" may, under certain circumstances, be used as an indicator of ongoing star formation. Astronomers have identified three spectral classes in which a significant set of blue galaxy cluster members may be categorized. The first is objects undergoing vigorous star formation with very blue colors and spectra showing emission-filled H-delta lines. Secondly, post-starburst galaxies are also observed. These are cluster members showing similarly blue colors as starburst galaxies only with moderate to strong H-delta absorption. Third are cluster members showing broad and/or high excitation line spectra, often found in active galactic nuclei. The Butcher–Oemler observations suggest at intermediate redshift a higher rate of star formation may be observed in a fraction of the galaxies in the cores of rich clusters than in the cores of rich clusters at low redshift.

The 1978 Butcher–Oemler paper sparked considerable debate. The ensuing series of Butcher–Oemler papers spans six years concluding with The Evolution of Galaxies in Clusters. V. A Study of Populations since z ~ 0.5. This paper presents photometry of 33 clusters of galaxies with redshifts varying from 0.003, the Virgo Cluster, to 0.54, the cluster Cl 0016+16. This study bolsters the conclusion put forward in their original 1978 paper, that there has been "strong, recent evolution of galaxies in clusters".

The Butcher–Oemler conclusion generated numerous investigations of the cores of rich clusters at intermediate redshift (0.3 ≤ z ≤ 0.9): Couch and Newell (1984), like Butcher and Oemler, acquired broadband photometry of such environments. Couch et al. (1983), Ellis et al. (1985), MacLaren, Ellis and Couch (1988), Aragon-Salamanca, Ellis and Sharples (1991) and Aragon-Salamanca et al. (1993) imaged clusters with redshifts between 0.5 ≤ z ≤ 0.9 in both optical and infrared bands. Spectroscopic observations were conducted by Dressler and Gunn (1982), Lavery and Henry (1985) and Couch and Sharples (1987). Studies of the morphologies of the galaxies in the cores of these clusters were undertaken using the Hubble Space Telescope by Couch et al. (1994) and Dressler et al. (1994). The outcome of these investigations is that the Butcher–Oemler effect is widespread in rich clusters at z > 0.2 and is due to vigorous episodes of star formation in a subset of the cluster members.

The effect does appear to be confined to rich clusters, at least as rich or richer than the Virgo cluster. Allington-Smith et al. (1993) observed galaxies in small groups out to a redshift of 0.5 and found no relation between the fraction of blue members and group richness; groups of all richnesses were observed to have similar high fractions of blue galaxies. Colless et al. (1990, 1993) have confirmed that better than 95% of blue field galaxies brighter than b_{J} = 22.5 are at redshifts less than z = 0.5, verifying at the 90% confidence level models predicting no luminosity evolution of the field galaxy population since z = 1. Using the Hubble Space Telescope, Dressler et al. (1994) observed the cluster CL 0930+4713 at 0.41 and Couch et al. (1994) observed AC 114 at z = 0.31 and Abell 370 at z = 0.37. These authors independently arrived at the conclusion that every observation of a merger between cluster members, both of which showed blue colors, had the spectroscopic signature of a starburst or post-starburst object. It is plausible therefore, that the Butcher–Oemler effect may be partially the result of galaxy–galaxy mergers.
