= Ohara Corporation =

Japanese manufacturing group of glass

Ohara Inc.
- Native name: 株式会社オハラ
- Company type: Public (K.K)
- Traded as: TYO: 5218
- ISIN: JP3197630001
- Industry: Glass; Ceramics
- Founded: October 1, 1935; 90 years ago
- Founder: Jinpachi Ohara
- Headquarters: Chuo-ku, Sagamihara, Kanagawa 252-5286, Japan
- Area served: Worldwide
- Key people: Hirokazu Saito (President)
- Products: Optical glass materials; Lens materials; Quartz glass
- Revenue: ▲JPY 28.2 billion (FY 2018) (US$ 255 million)
- Net income: ▲JPY 3.2 billion (FY 2018) (US$ 29.15 million)
- Owner: Seiko Group (41.1%); Canon (19.3%)
- Number of employees: 1,702 (consolidated, as of October 31, 2018)
- Website: Official website

Ohara Inc. (株式会社オハラ, Kabushiki-gaisha Ohara) is a Japanese global glass manufacturing company. It is headquartered in Sagamihara with subsidiaries in a number of countries, including Japan, the United States, Germany, Hong Kong, Malaysia, Taiwan, and China, with Ohara Corporation being the U.S. subsidiary of the Ohara Group. Ohara manufactures glasses since 1935, the year of its founding.

Their web site lists areas of specialization, including:

- Optical Glass
- Polished Substates
- Fused Silica and Quartz
- IR Materials and Optical Crystals
- Low Expansion Glass
- Glass Ceramics
- Measurement Services

== Optical glass ==
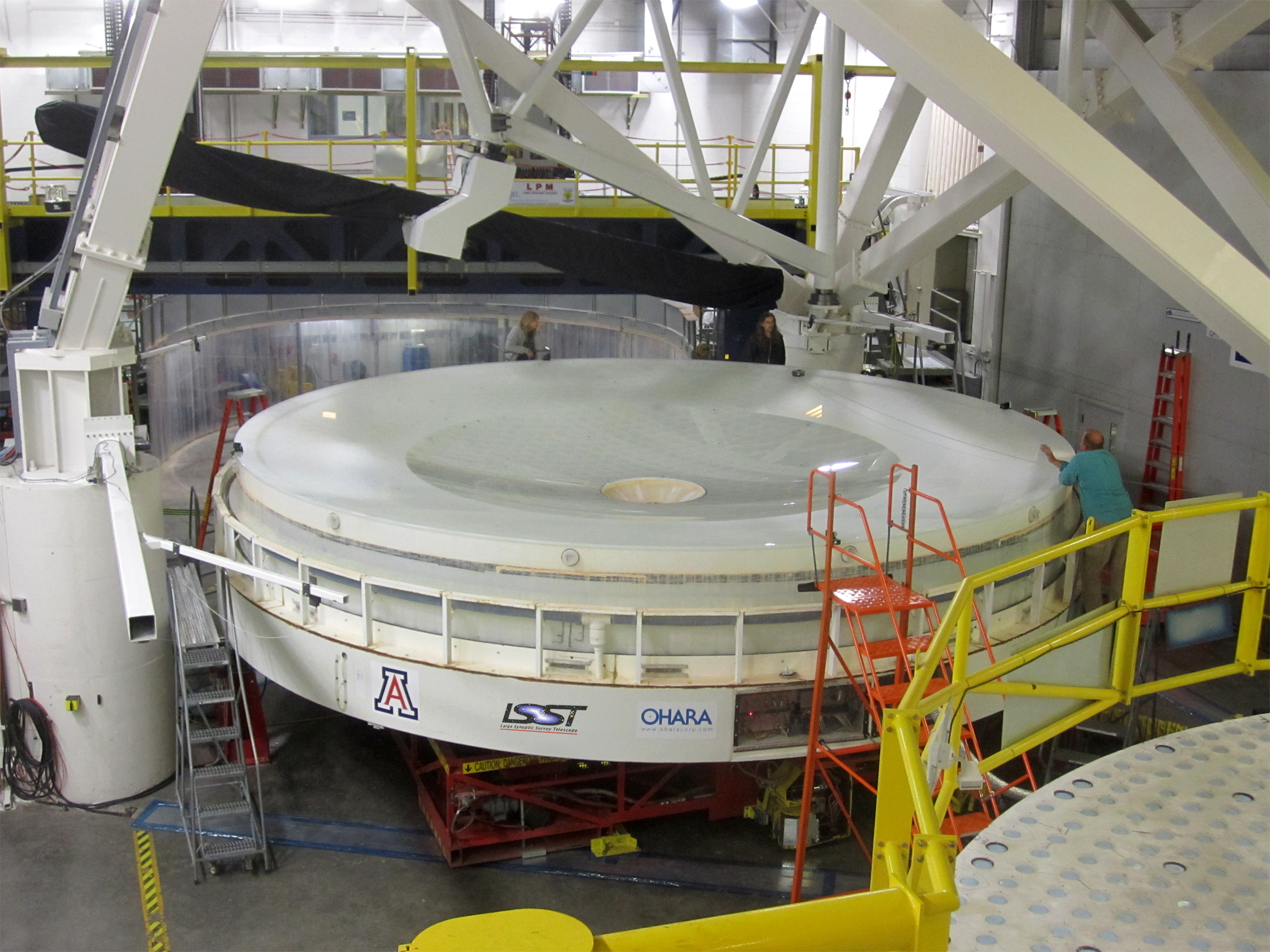
Mirror M1/M3 of the Large Synoptic Survey Telescope made by the University of Arizona's Steward Observatory Mirror Laboratory

Among other things, Ohara is a major supplier of optical glass. Lens design programs will typically include glasses in the Ohara catalog among their stock material choices, along with, for example, glasses in the Schott catalog. On their website, Ohara describes a line of more than 130 environmentally safe glasses, produced without lead and arsenic.

They produce more than 300 tons of optical glass a month (against 10800 tons/month for Schott and over 108000 tons/month for Corning). The glass is available in a variety of forms, including strip, slab, cut blanks, and pressings.

Ohara includes in its catalog the famous E6 borosilicate (similar to Corning's Pyrex), ClearCeram-Z (a vitroceramic similar to Schott's Zerodur), and two well-known low dispersion glasses: FPL51 (the UD glass used by Canon) and FPL53 showing properties close to fluorite.

=== Telescope mirror glass ===
Ohara supplied over 23.5 tons of their E6 borosilicate glass, the purest optical glass in the world, to be cast into the blank of the primary and tertiary mirror of the Large Synoptic Survey Telescope.

E6 glass was also used to manufacture the mirrors of the Giant Magellan Telescope and the Large Binocular Telescope, both having a primary mirror 8.4 m wide.
