= Jeremy S. Heyl =

American astronomer

Jeremy Samuel Heyl is an astronomer and a Professor at the University of British Columbia, where he holds a Canada Research Chair.

Heyl graduated from Princeton University with a degree in Astrophysics in 1992. He was a Marshall Scholar at Durham University for one year, then followed his supervisor Richard Ellis to the Institute of Astronomy at the University of Cambridge for the second year of his scholarship, where he completed a MSc degree. He was awarded his PhD by the University of California, Santa Cruz in 1998.

He is best known for his work in the physics of neutron stars, especially the importance of quantum electrodynamics in radiative transfer, non-radial oscillations during Type-I X-ray bursts and the cooling of magnetars. He has also researched galaxy formation, evolution and mergers.
