= Bahram Mobasher =

Iranian-born astronomer

- Born: Tehran, Iran
- Citizenship: United Kingdom
- Education: Durham University
- Awards: Khwarizmi International Award (2007)
- Scientific career
- Fields: Observational astronomy
- Workplaces: University of California, Riverside; Space Telescope Science Institute; European Space Agency
- Thesis: An infrared study of a sample of optically selected galaxies (1988)
- Doctoral advisor: Richard Ellis
- Website: faculty.ucr.edu

Bahram Mobasher (Persian: بهرام مبشر) is an Iranian-born astronomer. He has been a Professor of Observational Astronomy at the University of California, Riverside since July 2007. Mobasher currently holds an H-index above 138.

== Early life and education ==
Mobasher completed his PhD at Durham University, where he was supervised by Richard Ellis. He was a postdoc at the University of Leicester (1989–1991), followed by a position as Instrument Scientist on the Infrared Space Observatory (ISO) at Imperial College London (1992–1994). He remained at Imperial College as a Research Fellow from 1995 to 2000.

== Career and research ==
From 2000 to 2007, he held dual appointments as a Staff Scientist at the European Space Agency (ESA) and an Associate Astronomer at the Space Telescope Science Institute (STScI). In 2005, Mobasher and his team found that the starburst galaxy HUDF-JD2 was 'more massive and more mature' than previously expected. He was also a member of the Cosmic Evolution Survey.

In 2013, Mobasher was part of the team of scientists that discovered the dwarf galaxy z8_GND_5296 using deep optical and infrared images taken by the Hubble Space Telescope.

== Publications ==
- Wiklind, Tommy; Mobasher, Bahram; Bromm, Volker, eds. (2013). The First Galaxies: Theoretical Predictions and Observational Clues. Springer. ISBN 978-9400769489.
- Mobasher, Bahram (2018). Origins: The Story of the Beginning of Everything. Cognella Academic Publishing. ISBN 978-1626614819.
