= Scott Croom =

Professor of astrophysics

- Born: Scott Martin Croom
- Education: Durham University (PhD)
- Scientific career
- Fields: Observational astronomy
- Workplaces: University of Sydney
- Thesis: Cosmology and large-scale structure from quasar redshift surveys (1997)
- Doctoral advisor: Tom Shanks
- Website: www.physics.usyd.edu.au/~scroom/

Scott Martin Croom is Professor of Astrophysics at the University of Sydney.

Croom completed his PhD at Durham University in 1997. Following a postdoc at Imperial College London, he moved to Australia in 2000 to work at the Anglo-Australian Observatory, and joined the University of Sydney in 2006.

He describes his main research interests as cosmology and galaxy formation and evolution. He was the project leader of the team of astronomers that developed the Sydney-AAO Multi-object Integral Field Spectrograph (SAMI), for which they received the inaugural Peter McGregor Prize from the Astronomical Society of Australia in 2016. (Note: The development, through the use of a 'hexabundle' optical element that contains many optical fibres 'precisely aligned and fused', allows light to be collected from many locations across the face of a galaxy at once. The light entering the optical fibres is then fed to the spectrograph, which can measure a 'huge range of physical properties' such as the motion and chemistry of the gas and stars within galaxies.)

In 2024, he was first author of a study that revealed age as the 'driving force' in determining how stars move within galaxies.
