= Richard Ellis (astronomer) =

Welsh astronomer (born 1950)

Richard Ellis CBE FRS
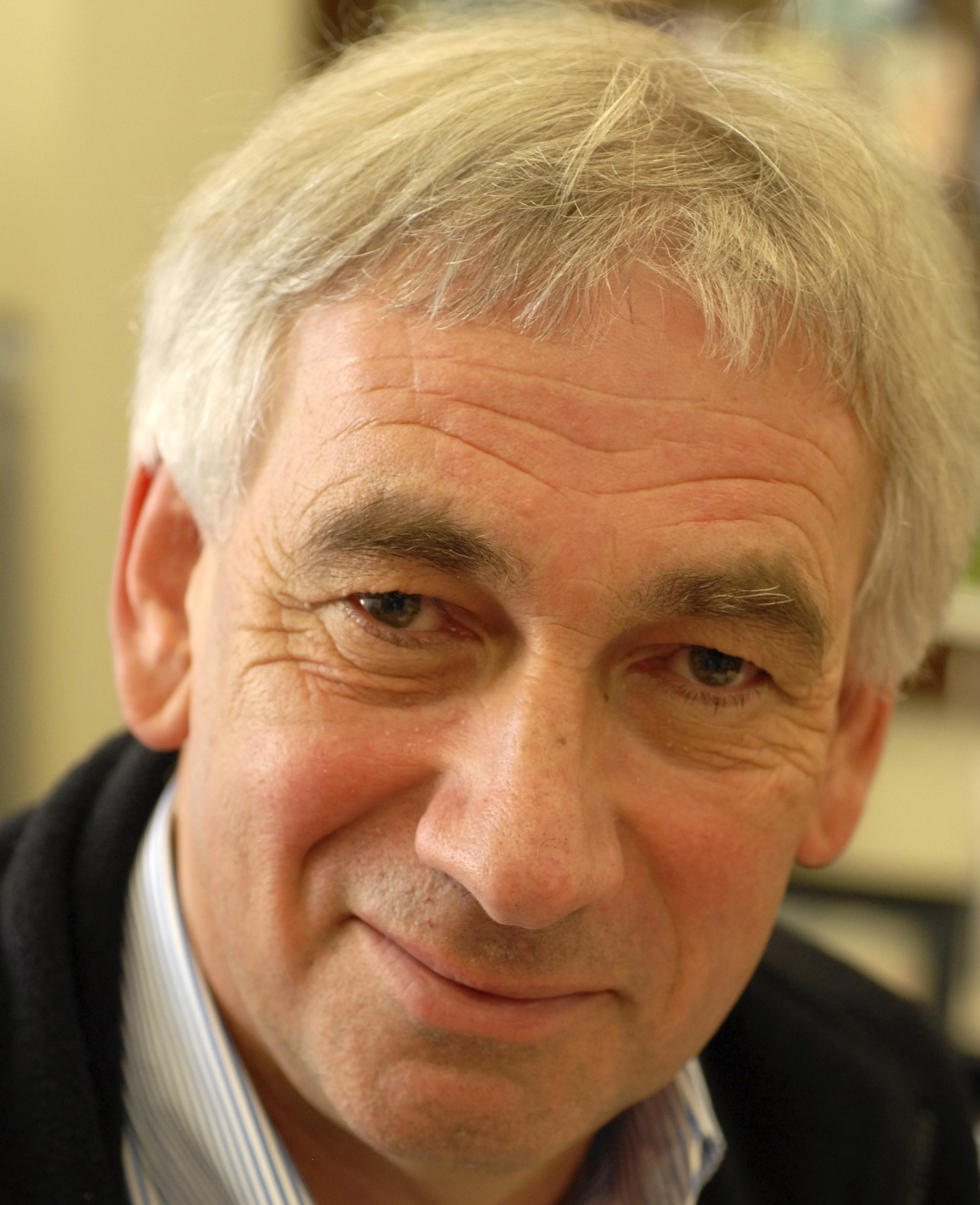
- Ellis in 2008
- Born: Richard Salisbury Ellis; 25 May 1950 (age 76); Colwyn Bay, Wales UK
- Education: University College London; University of Oxford
- Awards: Fellow Royal Society 1995; Bakerian Lecture 1998 Fellow Institute of Physics 1998; Fellow University College London 1999; Fellow American Association for the Advancement of Science 2001; Honorary Doctorate (D.Sc.) Durham University 2002 Gruber Prize in Cosmology (shared) 2007; CBE 2008; Gold Medal of the Royal Astronomical Society 2011; Breakthrough Prize in Fundamental Physics (shared) 2014; Carl Sagan Memorial Prize (shared) 2017; Fellow & Corresponding Member, Australian Academy of Science 2018; Honorary Doctorate (D.Sc.) Edinburgh University 2019; Michael Faraday Medal and Prize 2020; Royal Society Royal Medal 2022; Gruber Prize in Cosmology (sole recipient) 2023; International Member National Academy of Sciences 2024; Honorary Doctorate (D.Univ.) University of Surrey 2024
- Scientific career
- Fields: Astronomy
- Workplaces: University College London (2015–present); Caltech (1999–2015); University of Cambridge (1993–1999); Durham University (1974–1993)
- Thesis: Stellar abundances and nucleosynthesis (1974)
- Doctoral advisor: Donald Blackwell
- Doctoral students: See list: David Axon; Amy Barger; Jeremy Heyl; Richard Massey; Bahram Mobasher; Ian Smail

Richard Salisbury Ellis CBE FRS (born 25 May 1950) is a Welsh astronomer. He is Professor of Astrophysics at the University College London. He previously served as the Steele Professor of Astronomy at the California Institute of Technology (Caltech). He was awarded the 2011 Gold Medal of the Royal Astronomical Society, in 2022 the Royal Medal of the Royal Society and in 2023 the Gruber Prize in Cosmology.

== Education ==
Ellis read astronomy at University College London and obtained a DPhil at Wolfson College at the University of Oxford in 1974.

== Career and research ==
In 1985, he was appointed professor at the University of Durham (with two years at the Royal Greenwich Observatory) for his research contributions. In 1993 he moved to the University of Cambridge as the Plumian Professor and became a professorial fellow at Magdalene College. He served as director of the Institute of Astronomy from 1994 to 1999, at which point he moved to Caltech. Shortly after his arrival at Caltech, he was appointed as director of the Palomar Observatory which he later reorganized as the Caltech Optical Observatories taking into account the growing importance of Caltech's role in the Thirty Meter Telescope. After 16 years at Caltech, in September 2015 he returned to Europe via the award of a European Research Council Advanced Research Grant held at University College London (UCL).

Ellis works primarily in observational cosmology, considering the origin and evolution of galaxies, the evolution of large scale structure in the universe, and the nature and distribution of dark matter. He worked on the Morphs collaboration studying the formation and morphologies of distant galaxies. Particular interests include applications using gravitational lensing and high-redshift supernovae. He was a member of the Supernova Cosmology Project whose leader, Saul Perlmutter, shared the 2011 Nobel Prize for Physics for the team's surprising discovery of the accelerating expansion of the Universe. His most recent discoveries relate to searches for the earliest known galaxies, seen when the Universe was only a few percent of its present age.

At Caltech, Ellis was director of the Palomar Observatory from 2000 to 2005 and played a key role in developing the scientific and technical case, as well as building the partnership, for the Thirty Meter Telescope - a collaborative effort involving Caltech, the University of California, Canada, Japan, China and India destined for Mauna Kea, Hawaii. If constructed this will be the largest ground-based optical and near-infrared telescope in the northern hemisphere.

== Awards and honours ==
He was elected a Fellow of the Royal Society in 1995, appointed a Commander of the Order of the British Empire (CBE) in the 2008 New Year Honours, a Fellow and Corresponding Member of the Australian Academy of Science in 2018, and an International Member of the US National Academy of Sciences in 2024.

== Publications ==
Ellis wrote When Galaxies Were Born: The Quest for Cosmic Dawn (Princeton University Press 2022) in which he describes the observational progress made by astronomers over his career of five decades in probing galaxies to ever greater distances, and hence to earlier periods of cosmic history. The story culminates with the prospects for witnessing cosmic dawn - the emergence of the first generation of galaxies from darkness - with NASA's James Webb Space Telescope.

Ellis also contributed the text to a collection of striking photographs by Julian Abrams of the many large telescopes he has used in Modern Observatories of the World.
