= Amy Barger =

American astronomer (born 1971)

- Born: January 18, 1971 (age 55)
- Education: University of Wisconsin–Madison (BA); King's College, Cambridge (PhD)
- Occupations: astronomer professor
- Known for: pioneering discoveries in observational cosmology
- Awards: Annie J. Cannon Award; Newton Lacy Pierce Prize; Maria Goeppert-Mayer Award
- Scientific career
- Fields: Astronomy
- Workplaces: University of Wisconsin–Madison; University of Hawaii
- Thesis: The morphological evolution of galaxies in distant clusters (1997)

Amy J. Barger (born January 18, 1971) is an American astronomer and Henrietta Leavitt Professor of Astronomy at the University of Wisconsin–Madison. She is considered a pioneer in combining data from multiple telescopes to monitor multiple wavelengths and in discovering distant galaxies and supermassive black holes, which are outside of the visible spectrum. Barger is an active member of the International Astronomical Union.

== Education and career ==
Barger earned a Bachelor of Arts in astronomy-physics in 1993 from the University of Wisconsin-Madison. She was a Marshall scholar at King's College, University of Cambridge and received a doctor of philosophy in astronomy from the university in 1997. Barger holds positions as a Henrietta Leavitt Professor of Astronomy at the University of Wisconsin-Madison and as an affiliate graduate faculty member in the University of Hawaii Department of Physics and Astronomy.

=== Notable research ===
Barger's research discoveries concern distant Universe activity and objects, including dusty galaxies, quasars and supermassive black holes. Her research has overturned current and widely accepted models of how galaxies and supermassive black holes evolve.

==== University of Hawaii ====
From 1996 to 2000, Barger received a postdoctoral fellowship from the University of Hawaii Institute for Astronomy. During this time, she was a part of the MORPHS collaboration, a research group that studied the formation and morphologies of distant galaxies. Based on the data they retrieved from Hubble Space Telescope Wide Field and Planetary Camera 2 images, photometry and spectroscopy, the group was able to analyze and catalogue approximately 2,000 distant galaxies in 10 clusters and conclude that the spectral and morphological transformation of the galaxies were affected by two different timescales and/or physical processes.

Barger also used the Submillimetre Common-User Bolometer Array (SCUBA), a far-infrared camera, to discover new quasars, and as a 1999 Hubble Fellow and Chandra Fellow at large, she was granted access to NASA's Chandra X-Ray Observatory (CXO).

In January 2000, the results of Barger and her colleagues' search for the origins of the cosmic X-ray background were presented at the 195th national meeting of the American Astronomical Society in Atlanta, Georgia. With the data they gathered from their research in the CXO, the team furthered previous research in finding that about one-third of the origins of the X-ray background are active galactic nuclei (AGNs) that emit light not on the visible spectrum. The AGNs contain a massive black hole that produces X-rays as gas is pulled toward them at virtually the speed of light. The team also found that ultra-faint galaxies are a source of another third of the X-ray background. The ultra-faint galaxies emit little to no visible light due to dust formation around them or due to the absorption of visible light by cool gas. The team concluded that more optical observations with more powerful telescopes, such as the Next Generation Space Telescope and Constellation-X, were required to gain more insight into the two types of far-distant objects they observed.

As a follow-up to the research presented in January, Barger lead a team in surveying black holes. The team used a Keck 10-meter telescope, James Clerk Maxwell Telescope and the Very Large Array of the National Radio Astronomy Observatory to study the time intervals for black hole growth and found that the activity of an abundance of black holes in nearby galaxies was greater and more recent than once thought. The team concluded that, contrary to widespread belief, not all black holes formed when galaxies did. Rather, there are black holes currently growing slowly, taking more than one billion years to form. In December 2000, Barger led the presentation of the findings at a press conference at the 20th Texas Symposium on Relativistic Astrophysics, in Austin, Texas.

==== University of Wisconsin-Madison ====
In 2000, Barger became an assistant professor of astronomy at the University of Wisconsin-Madison while completing her University of Hawaii fellowship and eventually joining the faculty as a visiting adjunct astronomer.

In 2001, she received the American Association of University Women Annie Jump Cannon Award in Astronomy for her investigation of the X-ray background, which would lead to future spectroscopic research. During this time, Barger was on faculty leave from the University of Wisconsin-Madison to conduct research at the University of Hawaii and had earned a grant from the National Science Foundation to fund her work.

In 2002, she won the Newton Lacy Pierce Prize in Astronomy for outstanding achievement in observational astronomical research over the past five years. In October 2003, Barger was awarded a $625,000 Packard Foundation Fellowship for Science and Engineering toward her research.

In 2005, the results of a study led by Barger concerning how black holes and galaxies grow was published in The Astronomical Journal. The team captured and observed long-exposure X-ray images of black holes normally obscured by gas and dust to determine that they are between one and 12 billion light-years away from Earth. With Chandra Deep Field North and South, the Hubble Deep Field and images of the Lockman Hole, the researchers were able to accurately count the number of black holes that exist in between those that are the closest and farthest away from Earth. The team discovered that the earliest black holes, which are a part of the early Universe and have at least 100 million times the mass of the Sun, quickly reach a size limit and stop accumulating matter. The black holes with a mass between 10 million and 100 million times that of the Sun continue to accumulate matter and grow slowly in comparison. The researchers found that one or more systems connect a galaxy's formation of stars to its loss of cosmic materials through its black hole because the processes occur simultaneously. Barger and her team refer to the apparent shift in star formation from massive galaxies to relatively lightweight ones as 'cosmic downsizing' and as this phenomenon continues, dwarf galaxies will be the main source of star formation before the universe darkens as older galaxies fade away.

Barger and her colleagues' research on the early Universe has informed cosmic stratigraphy, which is the process of obtaining redshifts of galaxies through deep-field images to chronologize galaxy and star formation since the Big Bang. The more redshifted galaxies are—or the closer to red the wavelength of the stretched light from galaxies are—the older, brighter, less numerous and farther away they are from Earth.

In 2013, Barger, former advisee Ryan Keenan and astronomer Lennox Cowie published the results of a study on the density of galactic matter in The Astrophysical Journal. The team used redshift surveys and spectroscopy to observe and estimate the distribution of luminous and dark matter in a sample of galaxies and found that Earth's galaxy, the Milky Way, is inside of a large void named the KBC Void for the research team. As of 2017, the KBC Void is the largest-known void with a diameter of approximately 2 billion light-years. In that same year, Barger's former student Benjamin Hoscheit presented the results of their follow-up study, in which Hoscheit used the linear kinematic Sunyaev-Zel'dovich (kSZ) effect to measure galaxy clusters' motions and confirm the existence of the spherical-shaped KBC Void, which is surrounded by a shell of galaxies, stars and other cosmic materials.

== Honors and awards ==
- 1992 Barry M. Goldwater Scholarship
- 1993 Marshall Scholarship
- 1999 NASA Hubble Fellowship
- 1999 Chandra Fellow
- 2001 Annie J. Cannon Award in Astronomy
- 2002 Newton Lacy Pierce Prize of the American Astronomical Society
- 2002 Alfred P. Sloan Foundation Fellow
- 2003 Kavli Frontiers of Science Fellow
- 2003 David and Lucille Packard Fellow
- 2007 American Physical Society Fellow
- 2007 Maria Goeppert-Mayer Award of the American Physical Society
- 2015 John Simon Guggenheim Memorial Foundation Fellow
- 2011 Vilas Associates Award at University of Wisconsin-Madison
- 2017 American Association for the Advancement of Science Fellow
- 2017 Kellett Mid-Career Award at University of Wisconsin-Madison
- 2021 American Astronomical Society Fellow
