= Astronomy Australia Limited =

Australian not-for-profit company

Astronomy Australia Limited (AAL) is an independent not-for-profit company whose members are all Australian universities and research organisations with a significant astronomy research capability.

Since its incorporation in 2007, AAL has coordinated the Australian astronomy response to, and managed the funding for, a number of national schemes and projects, including the Australian Government's investments in astronomy infrastructure through the National Collaborative Research Infrastructure Strategy (NCRIS). AAL-administered funding has enabled construction, instrumentation development, upgrades, maintenance and operations of astronomy facilities and projects. AAL also represents Australia's interests in a number of major international projects and partnerships while also managing the Anglo-Australian Telescope (AAT) Consortium.

The Chair of the AAL Board of Directors is Professor Cathryn Trott, who's term ends November 2027.

== Projects ==
Facilities and projects associated with AAL:

- European Southern Observatory
- Giant Magellan Telescope
- Australian Astronomical Optics
- Anglo-Australian Telescope
- Optical Data Centre
- Australia SKA Regional Centre
- Gravitational Wave Data Centre
- ADACS / HPC
- Square Kilometre Array
- Australian Square Kilometre Array Pathfinder (ASKAP)
- Murchison Widefield Array
- Cherenkov Telescope Array
- Vera C. Rubin Observatory (previously LSST)
- eROSITA

== Membership ==
The current Members are

- Australian National University,
- Commonwealth Scientific and Industrial Research Organisation,
- Curtin University,
- Macquarie University,
- Monash University,
- Swinburne University of Technology,
- University of Adelaide,
- University of Melbourne,
- University of New South Wales,
- University of Queensland,
- University of Southern Queensland,
- University of Sydney,
- University of Tasmania,
- University of Western Australia,
- Western Sydney University.

== See also ==
- List of astronomical societies
- List of telescopes of Australia
