= Giant Magellan Telescope =

Telescope under construction in Chile

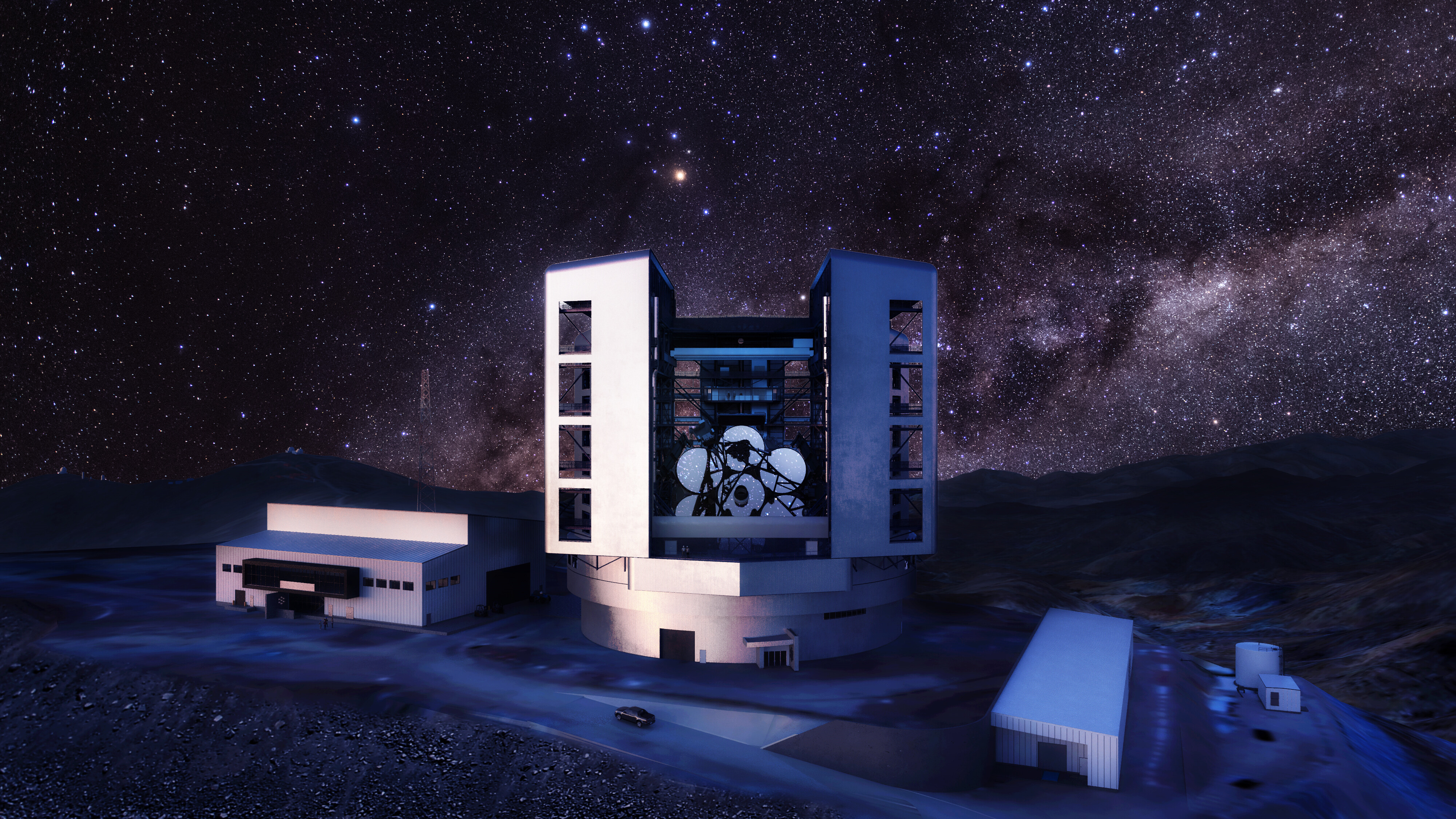
- Alternative names: GMT
- Location: Chile
- Coordinates: 29°02′54″S 70°41′01″W
- Altitude: 2,516 m (8,255 ft)
- Wavelength: 320 nm (940 THz)–25,000 nm (12 THz)
- Built: 2015–
- Diameter: 25.448 m (83 ft 5.9 in)
- Secondary diameter: 3.2 m (10 ft 6 in)
- Mass: 2,100 t (2,100,000 kg)
- Collecting area: 368 m^{2} (3,960 sq ft)
- Focal length: 18, 202.7 m (59 ft 1 in, 665 ft 0 in)
- Website: giantmagellan.org
- Location within Chile
- Related media on Commons

The Giant Magellan Telescope (GMT) is a ground-based, extremely large telescope currently under construction at Las Campanas Observatory in Chile's Atacama Desert. With a primary mirror diameter of 25.4 meters, it is expected to be the largest Gregorian telescope ever built, observing in optical and mid-infrared wavelengths (320–25,000 nm). Commissioning of the telescope is anticipated in the early 2030s.

The GMT will feature seven of the world's largest mirrors, collectively providing a light-collecting area of 368 square meters. It is expected to have a resolving power approximately 10 times greater than the Hubble Space Telescope and four times greater than the James Webb Space Telescope. However, it will not be able to observe in the same infrared frequencies as space-based telescopes. The GMT will be used to explore a wide range of astrophysical phenomena, including the search for signs of life on exoplanets and the study of the cosmic origins of chemical elements.

The casting of the GMT's primary mirrors began in 2005, and construction at the site started in 2015. By 2023, all seven primary mirrors had been cast, the first of seven adaptive secondary mirrors was under construction, and the telescope mount was in the manufacturing stage. Other subsystems of the telescope were in the final stages of design.

The project, with an estimated cost of US$2 billion, is being developed by the GMTO Corporation, a consortium of research institutions from seven countries: Australia, Brazil, Chile, Israel, South Korea, Taiwan, and the United States.

== Site ==
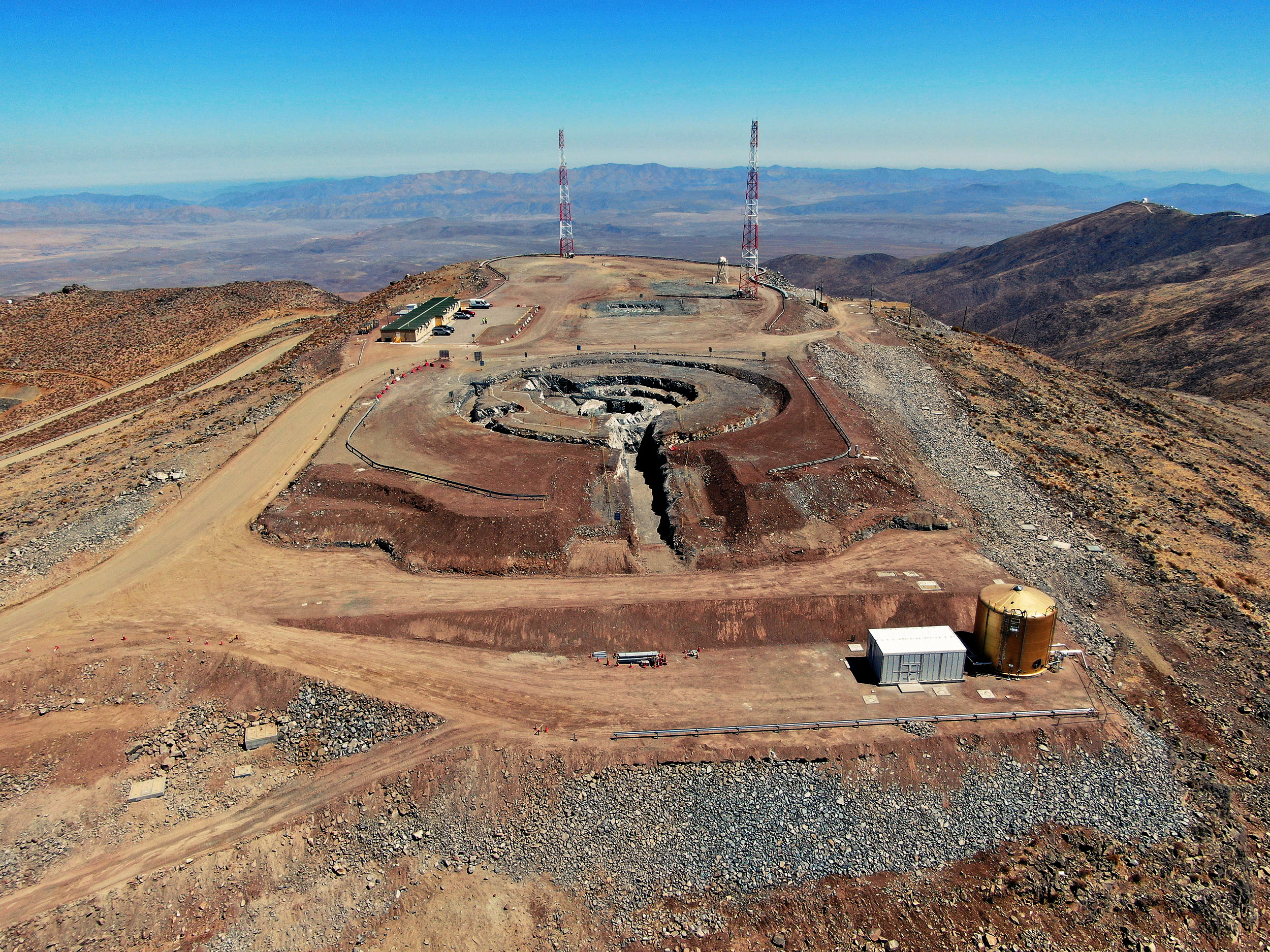
An aerial view of the Giant Magellan Telescope construction site.

The telescope is located at Las Campanas Observatory, which is also home to the Magellan Telescopes. The observatory is situated approximately 115 km (71 mi) north-northeast of La Serena, and 180 km (112 mi) south of Copiapó, at an altitude of 2,516 m (8,255 ft). The site has been owned by the Carnegie Institution for Science since 1960.

Las Campanas was selected as the location for the GMT due to its exceptional astronomical seeing conditions and clear weather throughout much of the year. The sparse population in the surrounding Atacama Desert, combined with favorable geographical conditions, ensures minimal atmospheric and light pollution. This makes the area one of the best locations on Earth for long-term astronomical observation. The observatory's southern hemisphere location also provides access to significant astronomical targets, including the galactic center of the Milky Way, the nearest supermassive black hole (Sagittarius A*), the nearest star to the Sun (Proxima Centauri), the Magellanic Clouds, and numerous nearby galaxies and exoplanets.

== Design and status ==
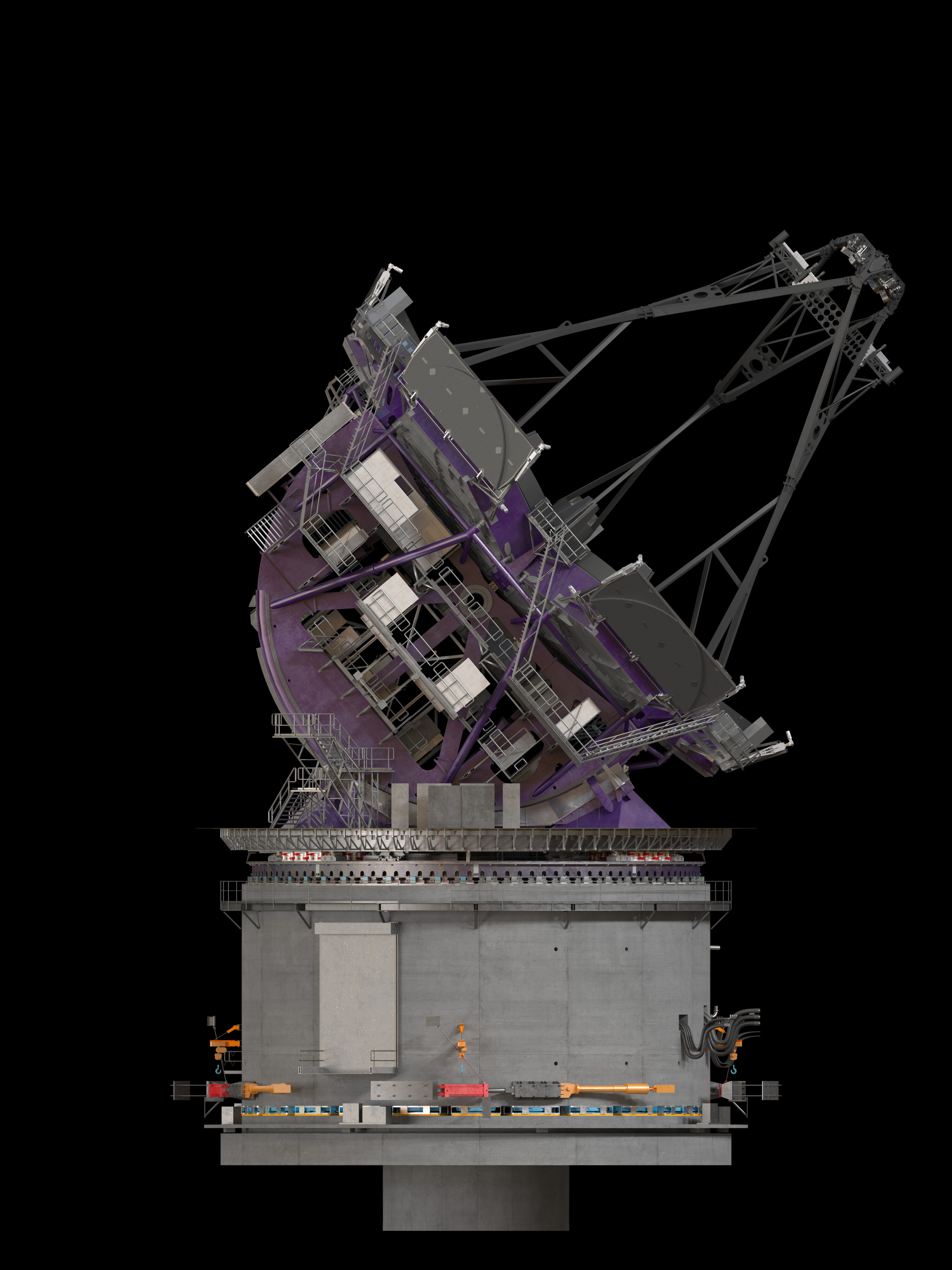
Giant Magellan Telescope rendering

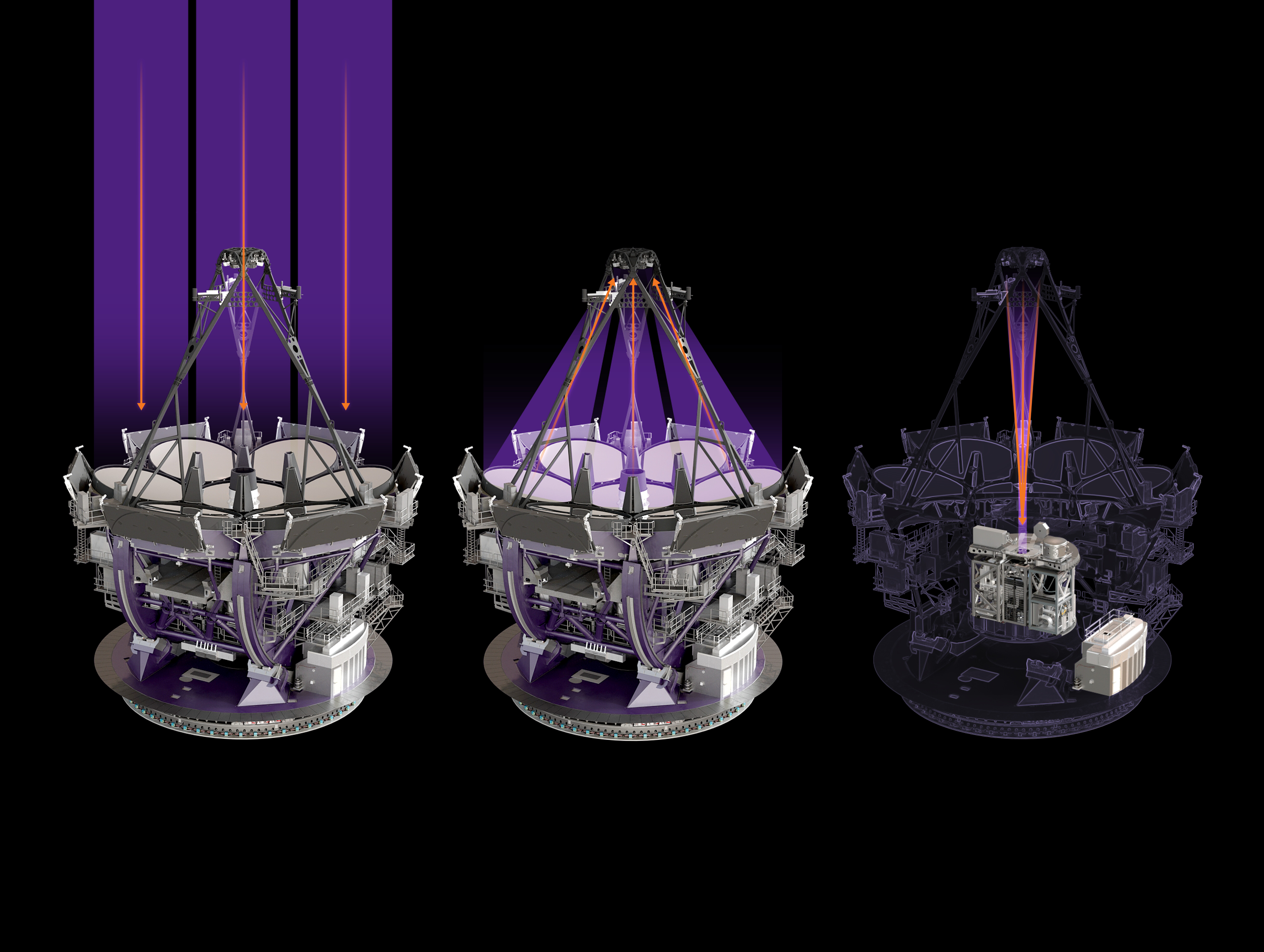
Light path on GMT

The Giant Magellan Telescope's Gregorian design will produce the highest possible image resolution of the universe over the widest field of view with only two light collecting surfaces, making it the most optically proficient of all extremely large telescopes in the 30-meter class.

=== Performance specifications ===
Optical Prescription	Aplanatic Gregorian
Focal Plane Scale	0.997 arcsec/mm
Wavelength Range	0.32–25 μm
Field of View	20′ diameter
Primary Mirror Diameter & Collecting Area	25.4 m, 368 m^{2}
Primary Mirror f/#	0.71
Mirror f/#Finalƒ/# (with Wide Field Corrector)	8.16 [8.34]
Diffraction-limited Angular Resolution	0.01″ at 1 μm

Site preparation began with the first blast to level the mountain peak on March 23, 2012. In November 2015, construction was started at the site, with a ground-breaking ceremony. In January 2018, WSP was awarded the contract to manage construction of the Giant Magellan Telescope.

The casting of the first mirror, in a rotating furnace, was completed on November 3, 2005. A third segment was cast in August 2013, the fourth in September 2015, the fifth in 2017, the sixth in 2021, and the last in 2023.

Polishing of the first mirror was completed in November 2012.

Ingersoll Machine Tools finished constructing a manufacturing facility to manufacture the Giant Magellan Telescope mount in Rockford, Illinois, in December 2021. As of 2022, construction of the telescope mount was underway. The structure is expected to be delivered to Chile at the end of 2025.

=== Enclosure ===
The Giant Magellan Telescope enclosure is a 65-metre-tall (213 ft) structure that shelters the telescope's mirrors and components from the extreme weather and earthquakes in the Atacama Desert, Chile. The 4,800-ton enclosure can complete a full rotation in a little more than three minutes and is designed with a closed-cycle forced-air convection system to maintain a thermal equilibrium within the telescope enclosure and reduce ambient thermal gradients across the primary mirror surface.

The enclosure design provides the telescope pier with a seismic isolation system that can survive the strongest earthquakes expected over the 50-year lifetime of the observatory and will allow the telescope to quickly return to operations after the more frequent, but less intense seismic events that are experienced several times per month.

In March 2022, engineering and architecture firm IDOM was awarded the contract to finalize the telescope's enclosure design by 2024.

=== Telescope mount ===
The telescope mount structure is a 39-metre-tall (128 ft) alt-azimuth design that will stand on a pier that is 22 metres (72 ft) in diameter. The structure will weigh 1,800 tons without mirrors and instruments. With mirrors and instruments, it will weigh 2,100 tons. This structure will float on a film of oil (50 microns thick), being supported by a number of hydrostatic bearings to allow the telescope mount to glide frictionlessly in three degrees of freedom.

In October 2019, GMTO Corporation announced the signing of a contract with German company MT Mechatronics (subsidiary of OHB SE) and Illinois-based Ingersoll Machine Tools, to design, build and install the Giant Magellan Telescope's structure. Ingersoll Machine Tools finished constructing a 40,000 square foot facility to manufacture the Giant Magellan Telescope mount in Rockford, Illinois in December 2021. As of 2022, construction of the telescope mount was underway and is expected to be completed in 2025.

The telescope mount consists of seven "cells" that hold and protect the telescope's 18-ton primary mirrors. The mirror support system does not have a traditional internal load-carrying frame. Instead, the strength comes from its unique shape and external shell. This allows the telescope mount to have a compact and lightweight design for its size. It also makes the telescope extremely stiff and stable so that it can resist image quality interruptions from wind and mechanical vibrations.

The "cell" primary mirror support system contains "active optics" with pneumatic actuators that will push on the back of the primary mirrors to correct for the effects of gravity and temperature variations on the seven, 8.4-metre-diameter (28 ft) primary mirrors. In addition, fourteen air handler units using CO_{2}-based refrigeration – the first system of its kind used for telescopes – are mounted to the interior of the mirror support system to circulate the air.

A closed-cycle forced-air convection system is used to maintain a thermal equilibrium within the telescope enclosure and reduce thermal gradients across the primary mirror surface.

As a precursor to the fabrication of the seven mirror support systems, a full-scale prototype has also been built to validate design decisions and demonstrate the performance.

In April 2023, OHB Italia S.p.A. finished manufacturing and testing the first of seven mirror covers for the Giant Magellan. In just over two minutes, the covers will retract in unison to protect the world's largest mirrors when not in use.

=== Primary mirrors ===
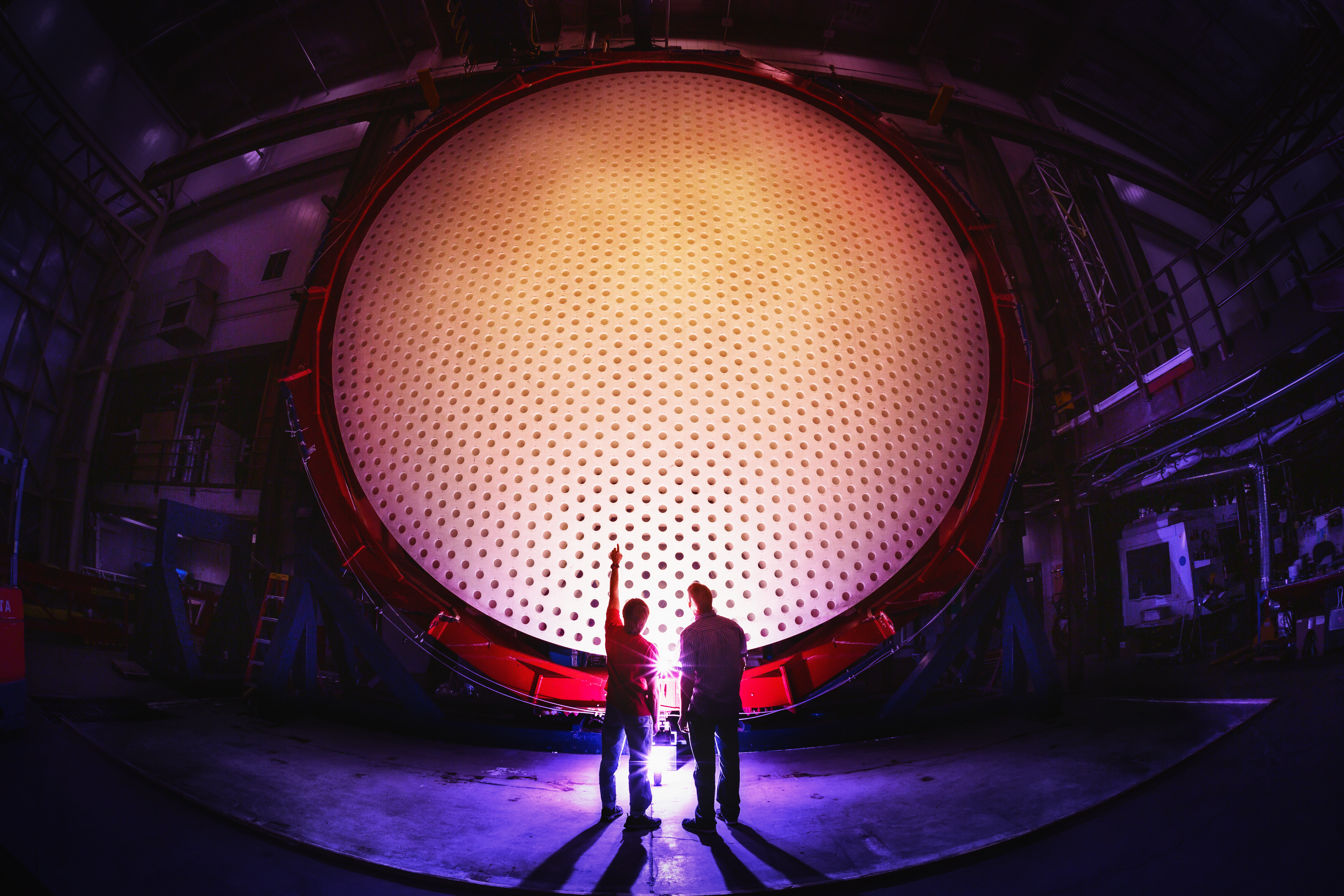
Giant Magellan Telescope Primary Mirror Back Surface

Comparison of nominal sizes of apertures of the Giant Magellan Telescope and some notable optical telescopes

The telescope will use seven of the world's largest mirrors as primary mirror segments, each 8.417 metres (27.61 ft) in diameter. These segments will then be arranged with one mirror in the center and the other six arranged symmetrically around it. The challenge is that the outer six mirror segments will be off-axis, and although identical to each other, will not be individually radially symmetrical, necessitating a modification of the usual polishing and testing procedures.

The mirrors are being constructed by the University of Arizona's Steward Observatory Richard F. Caris Mirror Lab.

The casting of each mirror uses 20 tons of E6 borosilicate glass from the Ohara Corporation of Japan and takes about 12–13 weeks. After being cast, they need to cool for about six months. Each takes approximately 4 years to cast and polish, obtaining a finish that is so smooth that the highest peaks and valleys are smaller than 1/1000 of the width of a human hair.

As this was an off-axis segment, a wide array of new optical tests and laboratory infrastructure had to be developed to polish the mirror.

The intention is to build seven identical off-axis mirrors, so that a spare is available to substitute for a segment being recoated, a 1–2 week (per segment) process required every 1–2 years. While the complete telescope will use seven mirrors, it is planned to begin operation with four mirrors.

As of 2024, segments one to three are complete—two are in storage and the third is undergoing optical testing to demonstrate figure control with the GMT test mirror cell—while the remaining four segments have been cast and are in various stages of fabrication. In October 2024, a completed segment was installed in a support-system prototype at the University of Arizona's Richard F. Caris Mirror Lab, beginning a six-month optical test of the primary mirror support system.

The primary mirror array will have a focal ratio (focal length divided by diameter) of f/0.71. For an individual segment – one third that diameter – this results in a focal ratio of f/2.14. The overall focal ratio of the complete telescope will be f/8 and the optical prescription is an aplanatic Gregorian telescope. Like all modern large telescopes it will make use of adaptive optics.

Scientists expect very high quality images due to the very large aperture and advanced adaptive optics. Image quality is projected at a 20-arcminute field of view, correctable from 0–20 arcminutes. The images will be sharp enough to resolve the torch engraved on a U.S. dime from nearly 160 kilometers (100 miles) away and expected to exceed that of the Hubble Space Telescope.

The Carnegie Observatories office in Pasadena has an outline of the Giant Magellan primary mirror array painted in its parking lot. It is easily visible in satellite imagery at 34.15591°N 118.13345°W.

=== Secondary mirrors and adaptive optics ===
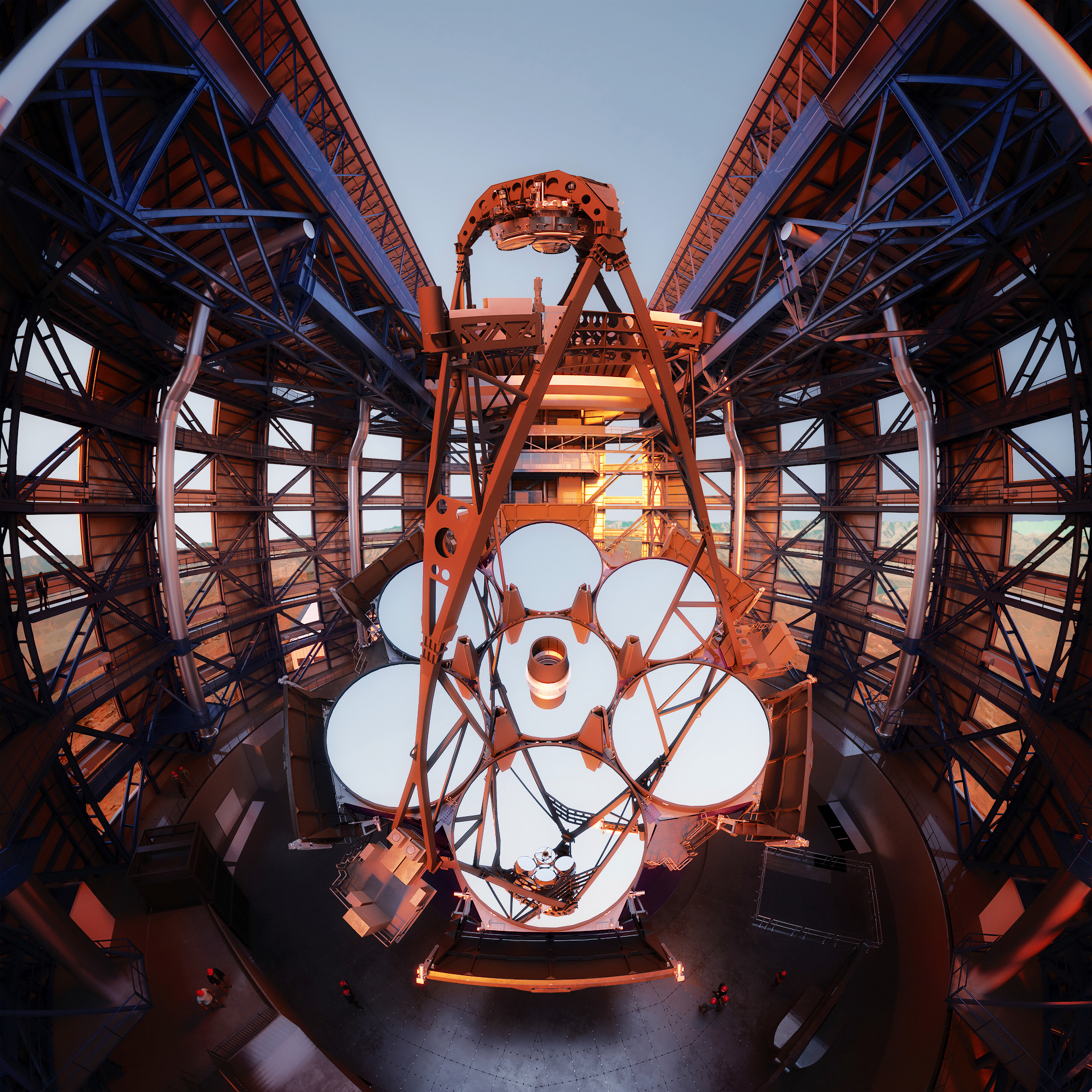
GMT secondary mirrors rendering

The Giant Magellan Telescope's Adaptive Secondary Mirror consists of seven segments about 1.1 metres (3.61 ft) in diameter. They are deformable "adaptive optics" mirrors tasked with correcting the atmospheric distortion of the light gathered by the telescope. The Adaptive Secondary Mirrors consist of a thin sheet of glass that is bonded to more than 7000 independently controlled voice coil actuators. Each segment can reshape its 2-millimeter-thick surface 2,000 times per second to correct for the optical blurring effect of Earth's atmosphere.

The first segment is under construction as of August 2022 and will be completed in 2024.

The Giant Magellan Telescope will have three modes of adaptive optics.

- Ground Layer Adaptive Optics (GLAO): The Gregorian design and integrated adaptive optics system allow ground-layer atmospheric turbulence to be corrected over a wide field of view, improving natural seeing image quality by 20–50% from the visible to near-infrared (with the greatest improvements at red wavelengths). The Giant Magellan uses wavefront sensors that allow any instrument to receive GLAO corrected images.
- Natural Guide Star Adaptive Optics (NGAO): NGAO uses a single natural guide star (bright) to deliver diffraction-limited, high-Strehl-ratio images (>75% Strehl in the K band) at wavelengths from 0.6 μm into the mid-infrared over a field of view a few arcseconds in diameter.
- Laser Tomography Adaptive Optics (LTAO): LTAO uses six laser guide stars and a single natural guide star (faint) to extend diffraction-limited performance to nearly the full sky with moderate Strehl ratio (>30% Strehl in the H band) at infrared wavelengths over a much wider field of view than NGAO (~20" at 1μm) and is available to any instrument designed to use this mode.

The Giant Magellan is the only 30-meter-class telescope with ground layer adaptive optics over a full field of view.

=== Science instruments ===
The Giant Magellan Telescope's Gregorian design can accommodate up to 10 visible to mid-infrared science instruments, from wide-field imagers and spectrographs that reach hundreds of objects at one time, to high-resolution imagers and spectrographs that can study exoplanets and even find biosignatures. Each science instrument is designed to take advantage of the telescope's four observing modes.

The telescope will have an advanced fiber-optic system that uses tiny robotic positioners to expand the capabilities of the spectrographs by allowing them to access the highest resolution of all telescopes in the 30-meter class over a full field of view of 20 arcminutes. Using this system, it is possible to observe multiple targets over the entire field with one or more of the spectrographs. This capability is well-suited for precise measurements of distances, dynamics, chemistry, and masses of celestial objects in deep space.

- GMT-Consortium Large Earth Finder (G-CLEF) – an optical-band echelle spectrograph
- GMT Multi-object Astronomical and Cosmological Spectrograph (GMACS) – a visible multi-object spectrograph
- GMT Integral-Field Spectrograph (GMTIFS) – a near-IR IFU and AO imager
- GMT Near-IR Spectrograph (GMTNIRS) – a near-IR spectrograph
- The Many Instrument Fiber System (MANIFEST) – a facility fiber system

Additionally, the Commissioning Camera (ComCam) will be used to validate the Ground Layer Adaptive Optics performance of the GMT facility Adaptive Optics System.

Science drivers for the Giant Magellan Telescope include studying planets in the habitable zones of their parent stars in the search for life; the nature of dark matter, dark energy, gravity, and many other aspects of fundamental physics; the formation and evolution of the first stars and galaxies; and how black holes and galaxies co-evolve.

== Comparison ==
The Giant Magellan Telescope is one of a new class of telescopes called extremely large telescopes with each design being much larger than existing ground-based telescopes. Other planned extremely large telescopes include the Extremely Large Telescope and the Thirty Meter Telescope.

Name	Aperture diameter (m)	Collecting area (m^{2})	First light
Extremely Large Telescope (ELT)	39.5	978	2029
Thirty Meter Telescope (TMT)	30	655	Unknown
Giant Magellan Telescope (GMT)	25.4	368	early 2030s
Very Large Telescope (VLT)	4 x 8.2	200	1998–2000
Southern African Large Telescope (SALT)	11.1 × 9.8	79	2005
Keck Telescopes	10.0	76	1990, 1996
Gran Telescopio Canarias (GTC)	10.4	74	2007
Note: future dates for first-light are provisional and are likely to change.

== Organizations ==
The Giant Magellan Telescope is the work of the GMTO Corporation, an international consortium of research institutions representing seven countries from Australia, Brazil, Chile, Israel, South Korea, Taiwan, and the United States. The GMTO Corporation is a nonprofit 501(c)(3) organization with offices in Pasadena, California and Santiago, Chile. The organization has an established relationship with the Chilean government, having been recognized through a presidential decree as an "international organization" in Chile. The telescope operates under a cooperative agreement with the University of Chile, granting 10% of the observing time to astronomers working at Chilean institutions. The following organizations are members of the consortium developing the telescope.

- Academia Sinica Institute of Astronomy and Astrophysics
- University of Arizona
- Arizona State University
- Astronomy Australia Limited
- Australian National University
- Carnegie Institution for Science
- FAPESP
- Harvard University
- Korea Astronomy and Space Science Institute (한국천문연구원) (KASI)
- Northwestern University
- Smithsonian Institution
- Texas A&M University
- University of Texas at Austin
- University of Chicago
- Weizmann Institute of Science

The Giant Magellan Telescope is a part of the US Extremely Large Telescope Program (US-ELTP), as of 2018. The US-ELTP will provide US-based astronomers with U.S. National Science Foundation funded all-sky observing access to both the Giant Magellan Telescope and Thirty Meter Telescope. The program was ranked as the highest ground-based priority in the National Academy of Sciences Astro2020 Decadal Survey, which noted that the US-ELTP will provide "observational capabilities unmatched in space or the ground and open an enormous discovery space for new observations and discoveries not yet anticipated."

== See also ==
- Atacama Desert
- Extremely Large Telescope
- Gran Telescopio Canarias
- List of largest optical reflecting telescopes
- List of optical telescopes
- Magellan Telescopes
- Thirty Meter Telescope
