= C12H16O =

The molecular formula C_{12}H_{16}O (molar mass: 176.26 g/mol, exact mass: 176.1201 u) may refer to:

- trans-2-Phenyl-1-cyclohexanol
