= Amos Smith =

American chemist (1944–2025)

Amos B. Smith III
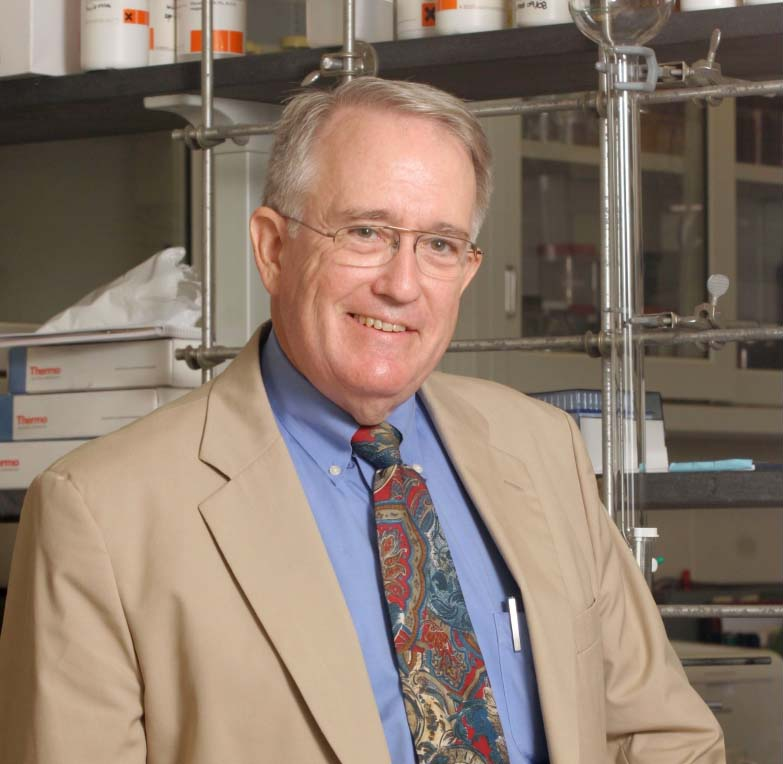
- Born: August 26, 1944; Lewisburg, Pennsylvania, U.S.
- Died: February 3, 2025 (aged 80)
- Education: The Rockefeller University
- Known for: Total synthesis of natural products
- Awards: Perkin Prize for Organic Chemistry; Paul G. Gassman Distinguished Service Award; Ernest Guenther Award (1993); William H. Nichols Medal (2014)
- Scientific career
- Fields: Organic chemistry, bioorganic chemistry, materials chemistry
- Workplaces: University of Pennsylvania/Monell Chemical Senses Center
- Thesis: The solution photochemistry of simple cyclopentenones (1972)
- Doctoral advisor: William C. Agosta
- Doctoral students: Ruth R. Wexler; Donna M. Huryn

Amos Brittain Smith III (August 26, 1944 – February 3, 2025) was an American chemist and academic who was a professor at the University of Pennsylvania.

== Life and career ==
Smith is most notable for his research in the total synthesis of complex natural products, as well as the chemistry of mammalian pheromones and chemical communication.

He held a co-appointment at the Monell Chemical Senses Center and held the Rhodes-Thompson Professorship of Chemistry at the University of Pennsylvania's department of chemistry.

Amos B. Smith III was a fellow of the American Academy of Arts and Sciences and member of the ESPCI ParisTech Scientific Council.

In 2015, he was awarded the Royal Society of Chemistry's Perkin Prize for Organic Chemistry "for his continued outstanding contributions to new organic reaction development, complex natural product total synthesis, and new small molecules for medicinal chemistry".

Smith died on February 3, 2025, at the age of 80.
