= Gershenzon =

Gershenzon is a Yiddish surname. Notable people with the surname include:

- Jonathan Gershenzon (born 1955), American biochemist
- Mikhail Gershenzon (1869–1925), Russian scholar, essayist, and editor

== See also ==
- Hershenson
