= Iwao Ojima =

Japanese-American chemist

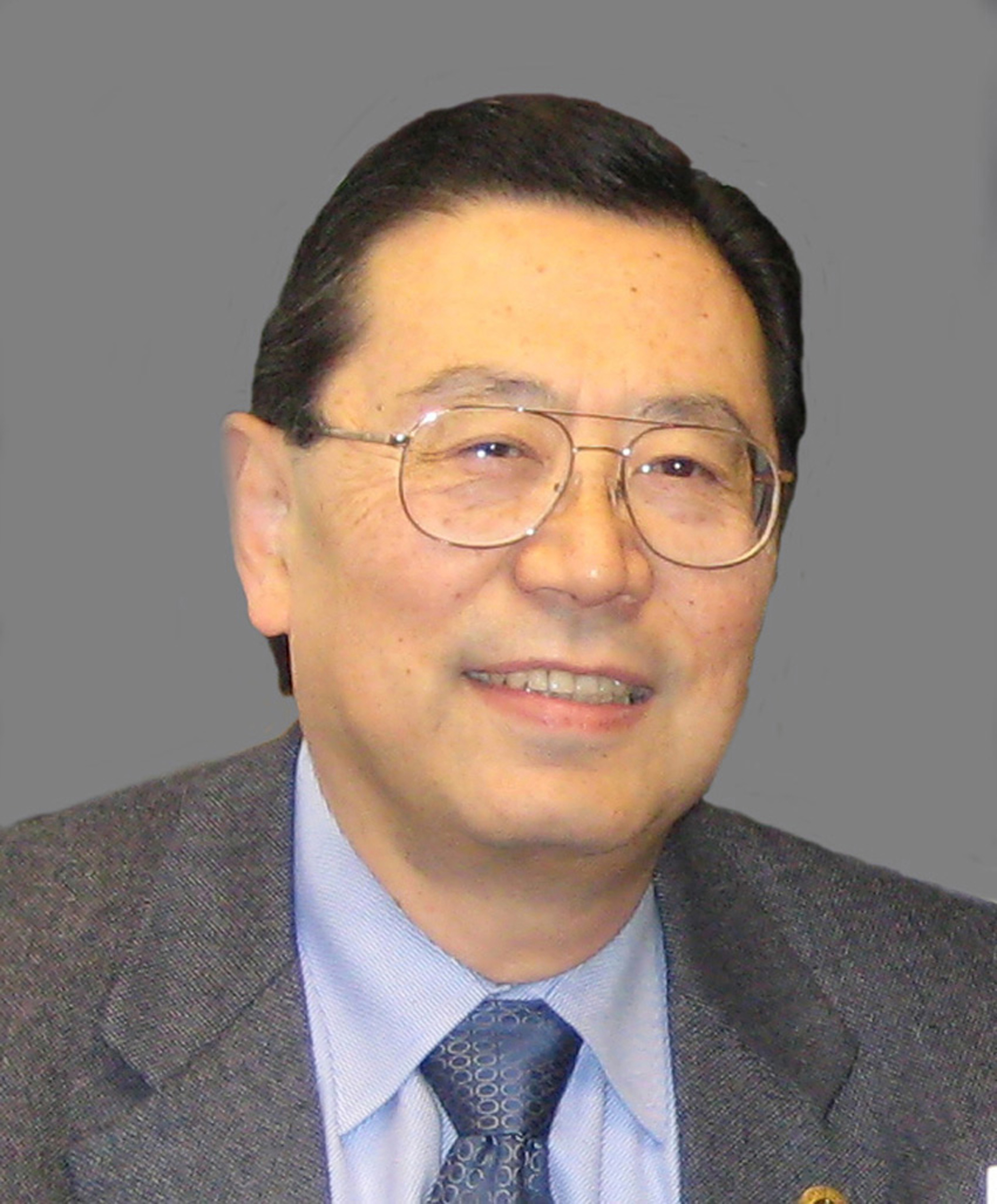
- Born: June 5, 1945 (age 81)
- Education: University of Tokyo (B.S., M.S., Ph.D.)
- Awards: ACS Ernest Guenther Award (2019); ACS Award for Creative Work in Fluorine Chemistry (2013); ACS E. B. Hershberg Award (2001); Chemical Society of Japan Award (1998); ACS Arthur C. Cope Scholar Award (1994)
- Scientific career
- Fields: Organic and Medicinal Chemistry
- Workplaces: Stony Brook University
- Website: stonybrook.edu/commcms/ojima_group

Iwao Ojima (born June 5, 1945, in Japan) is a Japanese-American chemist and university distinguished professor at the State University of New York at Stony Brook (Stony Brook University). He is known for his work at the interface of chemical synthesis and life sciences. He has received four National Awards from the American Chemical Society in four different fields of research. He is also serving as the director of the Institute of Chemical Biology and Drug Discovery (ICB&DD), as well as the president of the Stony Brook Chapter of the National Academy of Inventors.

== Biography ==
Ojima was born in Yokohama, Japan, in 1945 and educated at the University of Tokyo, Japan (B.S. 1968, Ph.D. 1973). Before coming to the U.S. as an associate professor at the State University of New York at Stony Brook in 1983, he worked at the Sagami Institute of Chemical Research in Japan, first as a research fellow and later as a senior research fellow and group leader of the organometallic chemistry and organic synthesis research group. At Stony Brook, he was promoted to professor in 1984, leading professor in 1991, and university distinguished professor in 1995. He served as department chair from 1997 to 2003 and has been serving as the founding director of the Institute of Chemical Biology and Drug Discovery (ICB&DD) since 2003, as well as the president of the Stony Brook Chapter of the National Academy of Inventors from 2015. He has been a visiting professor at the Université Claude Bernard Lyon I, Lyon, France (1989), the University of Tokyo, Tokyo, Japan (1996), the Scripps Research Institute, La Jolla, CA (1997), and Université de Paris XI, BIOCIS, Châtenay-Malabry, France (1997). As an extracurricular activity, he has been serving as the president of the Japan Center at Stony Brook since 2004.

== Research areas ==
In Ojima's early research career, he was mainly engaged in homogeneous catalysis of phosphine-Rh complexes, its development as new synthetic processes, as well as their applications to catalytic asymmetric synthesis and organic synthesis. He received a 25th CSJ Award for Young Investigator for his research on "Highly selective syntheses by means of organosilicon compounds – transition metal complex systems" from the Chemical Society of Japan in 1976. Through the 1970-1980s, he established himself as an authoritative scholar in catalytic asymmetric synthesis, editing a book, "Catalytic Asymmetric Synthesis" (Wiley-VCH) in 1993, and also published the second (2000) and third (2010) editions. This book collectively became a very popular reference book with >4,100 citations. He has conducted research on the development of new synthetic methods based on transition-metal catalyzed reactions and investigations into their mechanisms, which includes hydrosilylation, silylformylation, silylcarbocyclizations (SiCaCs, SiCaB, SiCaT), higher order (carbonylative) cycloadditions, hydroformylation, hydrocarbonylations, amidocarbonylations, cyclohydrocarbonylations, and enantioselective processes such as hydrosilylation, hydrogenation, hydroformylation, Michael addition, allylic alkylation/amination/etherification, etc.

Since the late 1970s, Ojima began his work in organofluorine chemistry by exploring the interface of fluorine chemistry and organometallic chemistry/catalysis. His research includes the development of processes for the highly regioselective hydroformylations of fluoro-olefins, synthesis of N-acylfluoroamino acids via hydroformylation-amidocarbonylation of fluoro-olefins, synthesis of a-trifluoromethylacrylic acid via carboxylation, novel ureidocarbonylation, synthesis of optically pure fluoroamino acids via enzymatic kinetic resolution, etc. Ojima's synthesis of trifluoromethyluracil from 2-bromotrifluoropropene became an industrial process by Japan Halon (then, Tosoh F-Tech). Furthermore, this process was successfully applied to the commercial synthesis of trifluridine (trifluorothymidine), an antiherpes antiviral drug, primarily used on the eye topically, such as "Viroptic" by Tokyo Yuki Gosei Kogyo in early 1990s. His work on optically pure fluoroamino acids and their use in medicinally active compounds, such as enkephalin, captopril and taxol (paclitaxel), brought medicinal and biomedical applications to the scope of fluorine chemistry community. He edited a book, "Fluorine in Medicinal Chemistry and Chemical Biology" (Wiley-Blackwell, > 1,700 citations) in 2009, featuring the basic principles and exemplary applications of fluorine incorporation to biologically relevant compounds and systems.

One of his achievements is the development of the "β-Lactam Synthon Method", which has been applied to the synthesis of α- and β-amino acids, oligopeptides, peptidomimetics, taxanes and taxoids. This method has been successfully applied for the practical synthesis of the Ojima lactam, a key intermediate for the commercial production of paclitaxel (Taxol), one of the most widely used anticancer drug for chemotherapy, through the Ojima-Holton coupling, as well as for the medicinal chemistry and development of new-generation taxoid anticancer agents. One of his second-generation taxoids, "ortataxel", developed from 14-hydroxy-10-deacetylbaccatin III, and licensed to Indena, SpA, Italy, has advanced to the Phase II human clinical trials. The extensive SAR studies performed in his laboratory have led to the development of numerous highly potent novel second- and third-generation taxoids. The third-generation taxoids showed virtually no difference in potency against drug-resistant and drug-sensitive cell lines. Some of the next-generation taxoids also exhibited excellent potency against cancer stem cells. Other highlights include his common pharmacophore proposal for microtubule-stabilizing anticancer agents, identification of the paclitaxel binding site and its bioactive conformation in the β-tubulin based on photoaffinity labeling and computational analyses, identification of unique characteristics of the next-generation taxoids in cancer cell biology and their mechanism of action, and efficacious tumor-targeted drug delivery of highly potent next-generation taxoids.

Currently, Ojima's research program is focused on the drug discovery and development of next-generation anticancer agents and their tumor-targeted drug delivery, antibacterial agents, antifungal agents, and antinociceptive agents, etc. In his research, all relevant chemistry and biological tools, including computer-aided drug design, chemical synthesis, computational biology, chemical biology and cell biology are integrated in close collaborations with structural biologists, computer biologists, cell biologists, oncologists, microbiologist, pharmacologists, anesthesiologists, toxicologists, etc.

As of January 2024, he has published >500 papers and reviews in leading journals, >100 issued patents, edited nine books, and given >135 plenary and invited lectures in international meetings. SciFinder lists >1,000 publications to his credit.

== Awards and honors ==
- ACS Arthur C. Cope Scholar Award (1994).
- Fellow, John Simon Guggenheim Memorial Foundation (1995).
- Fellow, American Association for the Advancement of Science (1997).
- Chemical Society of Japan Award (1998).
- Fellow, New York Academy of Sciences (2000).
- ACS Emanuel B. Hershberg Award (2001).
- Fellow, American Chemical Society "ACS Fellow" (2010).
- ACS Award for Creative Work in Fluorine Chemistry (2013).
- Fellow, National Academy of Inventors "NAI Fellow" (2014).
- ACS Enest Guenther Award (2019).
- Fellow/Member European Academy of Sciences (2020).
