= Robert E. Ireland =

American organic chemist

- Born: 1929; Cincinnati, Ohio, U.S.
- Died: February 4, 2012 (aged 82–83); Sarasota, Florida, U.S.
- Education: Amherst College (BA); University of Wisconsin (PhD)
- Scientific career
- Fields: Organic chemistry
- Workplaces: University of Michigan, California Institute of Technology, University of Virginia
- Doctoral advisor: William Summer Johnson
- Other academic advisors: William Gould Young
- Doctoral students: David A. Evans
- Other notable students: Peter Wipf

Robert E. Ireland (1929 – February 4, 2012) was an American chemist and the Thomas Jefferson Chair Professor of chemistry at the University of Virginia. He is known for his textbook Organic Synthesis and his contributions to the Ireland–Claisen rearrangement chemical reaction.

== Academic career ==
Ireland earned his A.B. in chemistry in 1951 at Amherst College and earned his Ph.D. in chemistry in 1954 from the University of Wisconsin with William Summer Johnson, and did his postdoctoral work at UCLA with William Gould Young. In 1956, he joined the chemistry department of University of Michigan. In 1965, he became a professor of organic chemistry at the California Institute of Technology. In 1985 he became the director of the Merrell Dow Research Institute in Strasbourg, France. A year later, he became the chair of the chemistry department of University of Virginia.

== Awards and honors ==
- Ernest Guenther Award, 1977

== Personal life ==
Ireland was married to wife Margaret at the time of his passing. He had two sons, Mark and Richard, with his first wife, Suzanne.
