= Sarah O'Connor =

American molecular biologist

Sarah O'Connor FRS
- Known for: plant biosynthesis, enzymology, mutagenesis
- Awards: Perkin Prize for Organic Chemistry; Wain Medal; Pfizer Award in Enzyme Chemistry; Royal Society Wolfson Research Merit Award
- Scientific career
- Workplaces: John Innes Centre, Max Planck Institute for Chemical Ecology
- Doctoral advisor: Barbara Imperiali
- Website: https://www.sarahoconnor.org/

Sarah E. O'Connor FRS is an American natural product chemist working to understand the molecular machinery involved in assembling important plant natural products – vinblastine, morphine, iridoids, secologanin – and how changing the enzymes involved in this pathway lead to diverse analogs. She was a Project Leader at the John Innes Centre in the UK between 2011 and 2019. O'Connor was appointed by the Max Planck Society in 2018 to head the Department of Natural Product Biosynthesis at the Max Planck Institute for Chemical Ecology in Jena, Germany, taking up her role during 2019.

== Education ==
O'Connor received her Ph.D. working with Barbara Imperiali on conformational effects induced by large proteins at the Massachusetts Institute of Technology (MIT). She was a postdoctoral fellow at Harvard Medical School, where she worked on epothiolone biosynthesis with Professor Christopher T. Walsh where she was first introduced to plant biochemistry. She later returned to MIT as a professor from 2003 to 2010, and then from 2011 to 2019 she was Project Leader and professor in Biological Chemistry at the John Innes Centre. Since 2019, she is Director of the Department of Natural Product Biosynthesis at the Max Planck Institute for Chemical Ecology.

== Research ==
O'Connor's work involves detailed study of many important species of medicinally-relevant plants: Rauvolfia serpentina, Catharanthus roseus, and Aspergillus japonicus. Her lab utilizes bioinformatics and enzyme characterization to uncover new pathways by which plants construct these molecules. Insertion of new enzymes, for example a halogenase or oxidase results in novel variants of the molecules not found in nature. In addition, O'Connor has started to study the molecule nepetalactone, a potential insect repellent by viewing the biosynthetic pathways of aphids with the help of etomologists.

== Awards and honors ==
- Pfizer Award in Enzyme Chemistry 2011
- Royal Society Wolfson Research Merit Award 2011
- Wain Medal 2013
- Elected to European Molecular Biology Organization 2017
- European Research Council (ERC) Advanced Grant 2018
- Royal Society of Chemistry Perkin Prize for Organic Chemistry 2019
- Honorary Member of the Faculty of Chemistry and Earth Sciences at University of Jena 2022
- Ernest Guenther Award in the Chemistry of Natural Products of the American Chemical Society 2021
- Gottfried Wilhelm Leibniz Prize 2023
- Elected Fellow of the Royal Society 2023
- Docteure honoris causa, Université de Tours, France, 2024
- Prelog Medal and Lectureship, Laboratory of Organic Chemistry of ETH Zurich 2024
- Elected Member of the German National Academy of Sciences Leopoldina 2024
- 2026 – Member of the American Academy of Arts and Sciences
- 2026 – Otto Bayer Award of the Bayer Foundation
