= Ruth R. Wexler =

American chemist

- Born: Pikesville, MD
- Education: University of Pennsylvania
- Known for: cardiovascular drug development
- Scientific career
- Thesis: (1982)
- Doctoral advisor: Amos Smith

Ruth Wexler is an American industrial chemist best known as a co-discoverer of apixaban, a marketed anticoagulant; and losartan, a blood pressure treatment.

== Education ==
Wexler received her B.A. in chemistry from Boston University in 1977, and a Ph.D. in organic chemistry working with Amos B. Smith at the University of Pennsylvania in 1982.

== Research ==
Wexler started her career at DuPont in 1982, rising to Executive Director in 1998. She then joined Bristol-Myers Squibb as an Executive Director in 2001, moving eventually to New Jersey to head their cardiovascular research unit. She has worked on targets involved in apoptosis, inflammation, obesity, and coagulation. As of 2018, she has over 215 original research publications.

== Awards ==
- 2015 - E.B. Hershberg Award for Discoveries in Medicinally Active Substances
- 2014 - Inducted into the ACS MEDI Hall of Fame
- 2011 - BMS Ondetti and Cushman Award
- 2004 - Outstanding New Jersey Woman in Research
