= Steven V. Ley =

British chemist (born 1945)

Steven Ley CBE FRS FRSC
- Born: Steven Victor Ley; 10 December 1945 (age 80)
- Education: Loughborough University of Technology (BSc, PhD)
- Awards: CBE (2002); FMedSci (2005); FRS (1990); Bakerian Lecture (1997); Davy Medal (2000); Ernest Guenther Award (2003); Royal Medal (2011); Arthur C. Cope Award (2018)
- Scientific career
- Workplaces: University of Cambridge; Imperial College London
- Thesis: Studies in the chemistry of benzobicyclo systems (1972)
- Doctoral advisor: Harry Heaney
- Website: www.ch.cam.ac.uk/person/svl1000

Steven Victor Ley (born 10 December 1945) is Professor of Organic Chemistry in the Department of Chemistry at the University of Cambridge, and is a Fellow of Trinity College, Cambridge. He was President of the Royal Society of Chemistry (2000–2002) and was made a CBE in January 2002, in the process. In 2011, he was included by The Times in the list of the "100 most important people in British science".

== Education ==
Ley was educated at Stamford and Loughborough University of Technology where he was awarded a Bachelor of Science and PhD.

== Research ==
Ley's main research field are the total synthesis of biomolecules. His group has published extensively on this topic, and has completed the synthesis of more than 140 natural target compounds, with notable examples including indanamycin, routiennocin, avermectin B1a, okadaic acid, spongistatin, thapsigargin, epothilone A, antascomicin B, bengazole A and rapamycin. His total synthesis of azadirachtin, completed in 2007, is widely regarded as one of the major landmarks in total synthesis. In the course of this work, he has also made substantial advances in many areas of organic chemistry, including the development of new catalysts, protecting groups and reagents. He is one of the inventors of TPAP, a widely employed oxidising reagent. He has also pioneered the use of immobilised reagents and flow techniques in multi-step organic synthesis. This work now incorporates flow chemistry for multistep organic synthesis applications.

By 2020, Ley had published 888 academic research papers spanning his career of 50 years.

== Honours and awards ==
As of 2022, Ley's work of over 900 papers has been recognised by about 45 major prizes and awards, including:

- 2022 Real Academia Nacional de Farmacia Foreign Member of the Spanish Royal Academy of Pharmacy
- 2018 American Chemical Society Arthur C. Cope Award
- 2014 IUPAC-ThalesNano Prize in Flow Chemistry
- 2013 Franco Brittanique Prize awarded by Société Chimique de France
- 2013 Longstaff Prize from the Royal Society of Chemistry
- 2011 Royal Medal
- 2010 Paracelsus Prize from the Swiss Chemical Society
- 2009 Perkin Prize for Organic Chemistry, Royal Society of Chemistry
- 2009 Tetrahedron Prize for Creativity in Organic Chemistry
- 2009 Heinrich Wieland Prize awarded for outstanding achievements in the synthesis of key natural products, Boehringer Ingelheim
- 2008 High Throughput Drug Discovery Methodologies Award from the Royal Society of Chemistry
- 2008 Prous Institute-Overton and Meyer Award for New Technologies in Drug Discovery, European Federation of Medicinal Chemistry
- 2008 Hans Herloff Inhoffen Medal, Helmholtz Zentrum für Infektionsforschung, Germany
- 2007 SCI Innovation Award
- 2007 Paul Karrer Gold Medal (University of Zurich)
- 2007 The American Chemical Society Award for Creative Work in Synthetic Organic Chemistry
- 2006 The Nagoya Gold Medal from the Banyu Life Science Foundation International, Japan
- 2006 Robert Robinson Award and Medal from the Royal Society of Chemistry
- 2005 The Yamada-Koga Prize, Japan
- 2005 Elected a Fellow of the Academy of Medical Sciences
- 2004 The Messel Medal Lecture, Society of Chemical Industry
- 2004 Innovation of the Year Award: Jointly with AstraZeneca, Avecia and Syngenta, Chemical Industries Association
- 2004 iChemE Award for Innovation in Applied Catalysis. The iAc Award
- 2004 Teamwork in Innovation Award from the Royal Society of Chemistry as part of Merck Chemicals Ltd; a team from Syngenta, Avecia, Cambridge University and Astrazeneca
- 2004 Alexander-von-Humboldt Award, Germany
- 1990 Elected a Fellow of the Royal Society (FRS) in 1990
- 1980 Corday-Morgan Medal and Prize of the Royal Institute of Chemistry
