= Donna Huryn =

American chemist

Donna M. Huryn is an American medicinal and organic chemist at the University of Pittsburgh’s school of pharmacy. Her research focuses on the design and synthesis of small molecules probes and drugs to treat cancer, neurodegenerative and infectious diseases.

== Education ==
Huryn received her B.A. (chemistry) from Cornell University, and Ph.D. in organic chemistry from the University of Pennsylvania.

== Career ==
She is on the faculty at the University of Pittsburgh’s school of pharmacy, holds an adjunct appointment in the department of chemistry at the University of Pennsylvania, is the principal investigator of the University of Pittsburgh Chemical Diversity Center, and was a visiting fellow in the summer of 2017 at the University of Bologna.

She is associate editor of ACS Medicinal Chemistry Letters. She in also an editor of the journal Organic Reactions and co-authored the textbook Medicinal Chemistry and the article "Medicinal Chemistry: Where Are All the Women?" which appeared in the ACS Medicinal Chemistry Letters Journal.

== Recognition ==
Huryn is a fellow of the American Chemical Society, recipient of the ACS Philadelphia Local Section Award, has held a number of elected positions within the American Chemical Society at both the local and national levels, and is 2015 Chair of the Division of Organic Chemistry.

== Activism ==
Huryn also formed, along with a number of other scientists, the Empowering Women in Organic Chemistry Conferences in 2019. The goal was to empower and bring the research and career of all marginalized individuals in chemistry-related fields to the forefront of the scientific community. Huryn noticed how there was not enough women pursuing and maintaining a career in organic chemistry, and thus founded this organization. The Empowering Women in Organic Chemistry Conferences allowed for women leaders to present their scientific findings and hear the stories of how eminent women in the field of organic chemistry overcame the challenges they faced being female.
