= Hershenson =

Hershenson is a surname. Notable people with this surname include:

- Bruce Hershenson, American entrepreneur, publisher, and gamble
- Mar Hershenson, American electrical engineer, professor, and businessman
- Matt Hershenson, co-founder of Playground Global

== See also ==
- Gershenzon
