= Camphorsultam =

Names
- IUPAC name 2,10-Camphorsultam
- Systematic IUPAC name (1S,5R,7R)-10,10-Dimethyl-3-thia-4-azatricyclo[5.2.1.0^{1,5}]decane 3,3-dioxide
- Other names Camphorsultam, Bornanesultam, Oppolzer's Sultam, (–)-10,2-Camphorsultam, (1S)-(–)-2,10-Camphorsultam, (3aS,6R,7aR)-8,8-Dimethylhexahydro-3a,6-methano-2,1-benzisothiazole 2,2-dioxide, (−)-exo-10,2-Bornanesultam

Identifiers
CAS Number	108448-77-7
3D model (JSmol)	Interactive image
ChemSpider	628224
PubChem CID	719751
- InChI: InChI=1S/C10H17NO2S/c1-9(2)7-3-4-10(9)6-14(12,13)11-8(10)5-7/h7-8,11H,3-6H2,1-2H3/t7-,8-,10-/m0/s1 Key: DPJYJNYYDJOJNO-NRPADANISA-N; InChI=1/C10H17NO2S/c1-9(2)7-3-4-10(9)6-14(12,13)11-8(10)5-7/h7-8,11H,3-6H2,1-2H3/t7-,8-,10-/m0/s1 Key: DPJYJNYYDJOJNO-NRPADANIBE
- SMILES: CC1([C@H]2CC[C@@]13CS(=O)(=O)N[C@H]3C2)C

Properties
Chemical formula	C_{10}H_{17}NO_{2}S
Molar mass	215.31 g·mol^{−1}
Appearance	White, crystalline solid
Density	1.287 g/cm^{3}
Melting point	181 to 183 °C (358 to 361 °F; 454 to 456 K)
Boiling point	325 °C (617 °F; 598 K)
Refractive index (n_{D})	1.567

Hazards
- Occupational safety and health (OHS/OSH)
Main hazards	Irritating to respiratory system and respiratory tract
Flash point	105.3 °C (221.5 °F; 378.4 K)
- Except where otherwise noted, data are given for materials in their standard state (at 25 °C [77 °F], 100 kPa). Infobox references

Camphorsultam, also known as bornanesultam, is a crystalline solid primarily used as a chiral auxiliary in the synthesis of other chemicals with a specific desired stereoselectivity. Camphorsultam is commercially available in both enantiomers of its exo forms: (1R)-(+)-2,10-camphorsultam and (1S)-(−)-2,10-camphorsultam.

== Synthesis ==
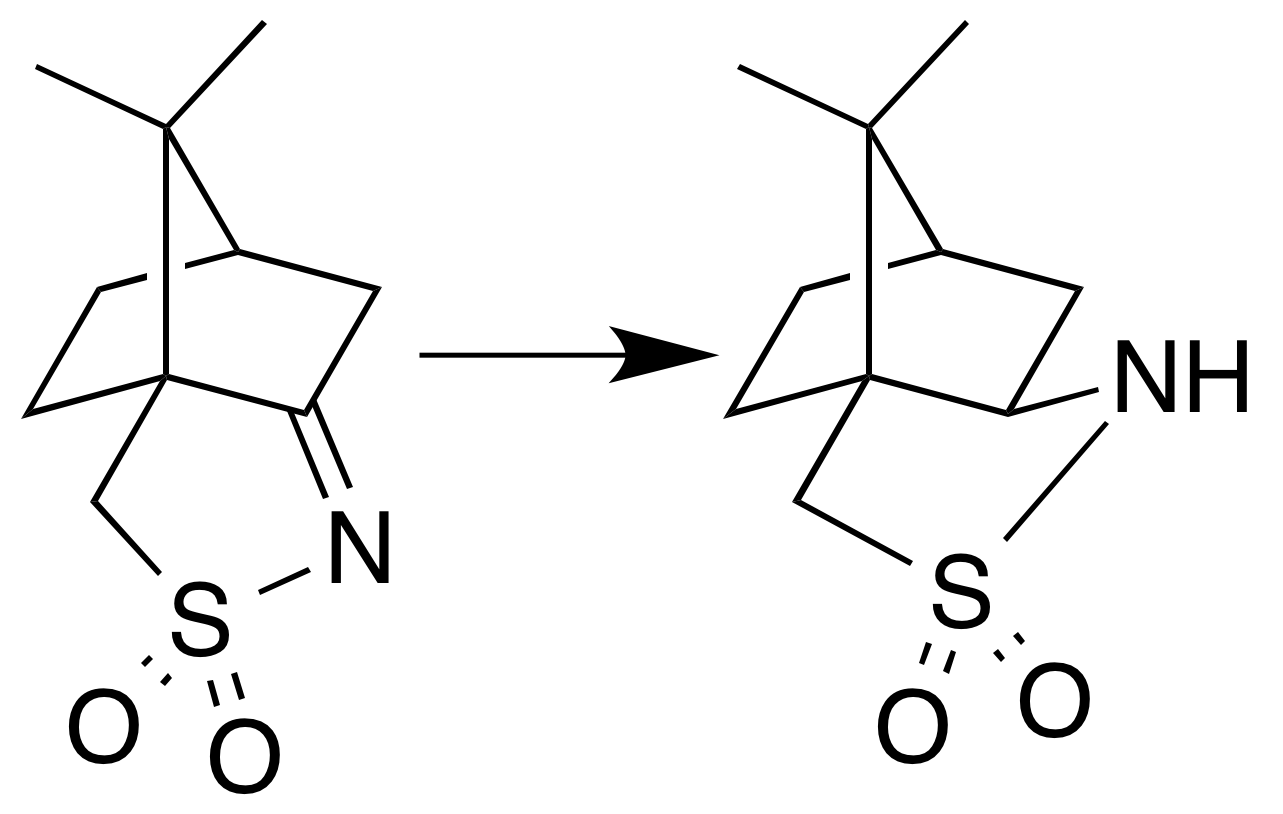

Camphorsultam is synthesized by reduction of camphorsulfonylimine. This reaction was originally performed as a catalytic hydrogenation using Raney Nickel, but the modern preparation instead uses lithium aluminium hydride for the reduction. These reductive methods are stereoselective: although both the endo and exo diastereomeric forms are theoretically possible, only the exo isomer is actually produced due to steric effects of one of the methyl groups. Camphorsultam is often referred to as Oppolzer's sultam in reference to Wolfgang Oppolzer and colleagues, who developed the lithium aluminium hydride approach to this compound and pioneered its use in asymmetric synthesis.

== Uses ==
Due to its ability to form derivatives through its nitrogen atom and the structural rigidity of its chirality, camphorsultam is often used in reactions as a chiral auxiliary in order to allow a reaction to proceed with very specific stereoselectivity. During the synthesis of Manzacidin B, camphorsultam is used in order to obtain the desired stereoselective product. During a Michael reaction, a Claisen rearrangement, or a cycloaddition reaction camphorsultam is able to confer a great deal of stereoselectivity. This allows for more control over the reactions and the creation of very specific desired products. Stereoselectivity can be further increased if substrates are equipped with two chiral auxiliaries, acting in a cooperative fashion.

Camphorsultam also has applications in determining a compound's absolute stereochemistry. For that reason, it is sometimes referred to as a "chiral probe".
