= Max Planck Institute for Chemical Ecology =

German research institute

Coordinates: 50°54′38″N 11°34′5″E

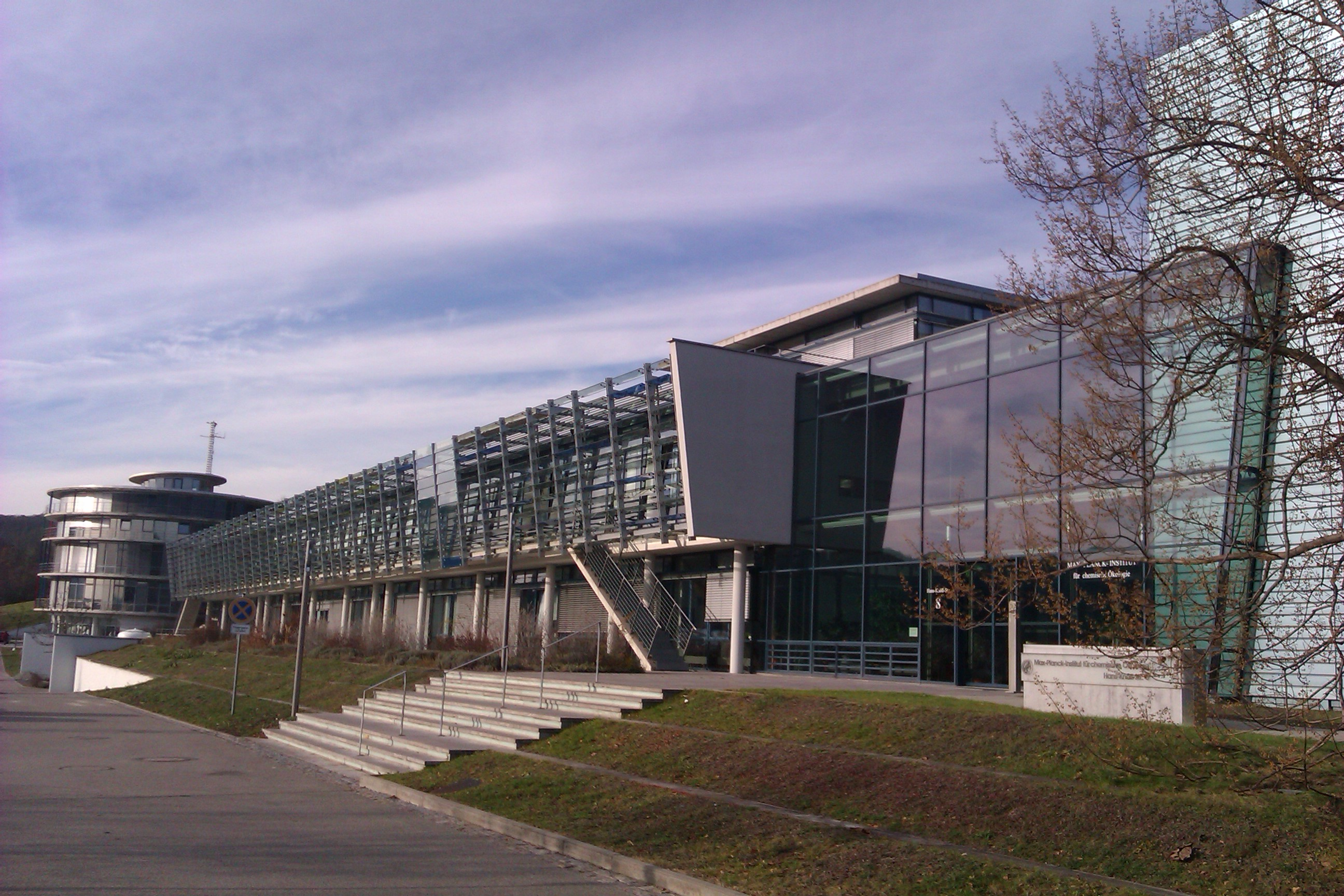
The main building of the institute, located on top of the Beutenberg.

The Max Planck Institute for Chemical Ecology is located on Beutenberg Campus in Jena, Germany. It was founded in March 1996 and is one of 80 institutes of the Max Planck Society (Max Planck Gesellschaft). Chemical ecology examines the role of chemical signals that mediate the interactions between plants, animals, and their environment, as well as the evolutionary and behavioral consequences of these interactions. The managing director of the institute is Jonathan Gershenzon.

About 175 scientists, among them many PhD candidates and students, do their research in five departments and further independent research groups.

- Department of Biochemistry (Jonathan Gershenzon)
- Department of Evolutionary Neuroethology (Bill S. Hansson)
- Department of Insect Symbiosis (Martin Kaltenpoth)
- Department of Natural Product Biosynthesis (Sarah O'Connor)
- Emeritus Group Entomology (David G. Heckel)
- Max Planck Research Group Evolutionary and Integrative Physiology (Shabnam Mohammadi)
- Lise Meitner Group Social Behavior (Yuko Ulrich)
- Research Group Olfactory Coding (Silke Sachse)
- Research Group Plant Defense Physiology (Axel Mithöfer)
- NMR Group (Christian Paetz)
- Mass Spectrometry Group (Rayko Halitschke)
- Max Planck Fellow Group Plankton Community Interaction (Georg Pohnert)

== International Max Planck Research School (IMPRS) ==
The International Max Planck Research School "Chemical Communication in Ecological Systems" is a graduate program jointly organized by the Max Planck Institute for Chemical Ecology, the Friedrich Schiller University Jena and the Leibniz Institute of Plant Genetics and Crop Plant Research in Gatersleben. The IMPRS spokespersons are Sarah O'Connor and Holger Schielzeth.
