= Ernest Wenkert =

Austrian-born American chemist

- Born: 16 October 1925; Vienna, Austria
- Died: 20 June 2014 (aged 88)
- Education: University of Washington, Harvard University
- Known for: Organic chemistry; Natural Products Chemistry
- Awards: Ernest Guenther Award (1971)
- Scientific career
- Fields: Chemistry
- Workplaces: University of California, San Diego
- Doctoral advisor: Robert Burns Woodward

Ernest Wenkert (16 October 1925 – 20 June 2014) was an Austrian-born American chemist.

Wenkert received B.S. (1945) and M.S. (1947) degrees in chemistry from the University of Washington. In 1951, he was awarded a Ph.D. degree in organic chemistry from Harvard University, where he studied under Robert Burns Woodward. From 1951, he served as a faculty member at Iowa State University, and was in 1961 appointed as the Herman T. Briscoe Professor of Chemistry at Indiana University. In 1974, he took the position as E.D. Butcher Professor of Chemistry at Rice University, also serving as chair of the chemistry department. In 1980, he moved to the University of California, San Diego, where he stayed until his retirement in 1994.

== Sources ==
- Ainsworth, S.J., Chem. Eng. News, 2015, 93 (19); https://cen.acs.org/articles/93/i19/Ernest-Wenkert.html
- Mike De Martino, Baran Group Meeting 01/26/2004; https://www.scripps.edu/baran/images/grpmtgpdf/Demartino_Jan_05.pdf
