= Perkin Prize for Organic Chemistry =

British scientific prize

- Awarded for: Contributions to organic chemistry
- Sponsored by: Royal Society of Chemistry
- Date: 2008
- Country: United Kingdom (international)
- Reward: £5000
- Website: Official website

The Perkin Prize for Organic Chemistry is an award established in 2008 by the Royal Society of Chemistry for sustained originality and achievement in research in any area of organic chemistry.

The prize is named after Sir William Henry Perkin (1838-1907), inventor of the first aniline dye, and is awarded on a biennial basis. The winner receives £5000, a medal and a certificate at an awards ceremony in November and undertakes a UK lecture tour.

== Winners ==
- 2009: Steven V. Ley, "for his outstanding creative work and innovative solutions in the art of organic synthesis"
- 2011: Stephen G. Davies, "for fundamental contributions that his research has made to the areas of stereocontrol in organometallic chemistry, asymmetric synthesis and total synthesis over 15 years"
- 2013: Varinder Aggarwal, "for his truly original contributions to the field of synthetic organic chemistry"
- 2015: Amos Smith, "for his continued outstanding contributions to new organic reaction development, complex natural product total synthesis, and new small molecules for medicinal chemistry"
- 2017: David A. Leigh, "for pioneering contributions to the synthesis and applications of complex catenanes, rotaxanes and molecular knots that underpin the field of artificial molecular machines"
- 2019: Sarah O'Connor, "for the discovery, enzymology and engineering of the biosynthetic pathways for complex natural products from plants."

== See also ==
- List of chemistry awards
