= Martin Kaltenpoth =

German evolutionary ecologist

Martin Kaltenpoth (born in 1977 in Hagen) is a German evolutionary ecologist.

== Scientific career ==
After studying biology at the University of Würzburg, which was supported by the German Academic Scholarship Foundation (Studienstiftung), Kaltenpoth completed his doctorate in 2006 under the supervision of Erhard Strohm on the topic Protective bacteria and attractive pheromones - symbiosis and chemical communication in beewolves. He was a postdoctoral researcher at the University of Regensburg and the University of Utah in Salt Lake City. In 2009, he joined the Max Planck Institute for Chemical Ecology as head of the Max Planck Research Group Insect Symbiosis. In 2015, he was appointed Chair of Evolutionary Ecology at the University of Mainz. Since 2020, he has been Director and Scientific Member at the Max Planck Institute for Chemical Ecology and Head of the Department of Insect Symbiosis.

== Research ==
Kaltenpoth studies symbioses between insects and microorganisms. Bacteria are important partners for their hosts, as they help open up new habitats and the exploit new food sources. They also play a vital role in their host insects’ defense against enemies. The goal of Kaltenpoth's research is to characterize the diversity of bacterial symbionts in insects and their importance for the ecology of their hosts, tracing their evolutionary origin.

== Honors and awards ==
- Student Research Grant Award, Animal Behavior Society, USA, 2001
- Theodore Roosevelt Memorial Grant, American Museum of Natural History, USA, 2002
- Biocenter Science Award of the University of Würzburg, 2006
- Award of the Ingrid Weiss / Horst Wiehe Foundation, German Society for General and Applied Entomology (DGaaE), 2007
- Young Scientist Award, Society for Experimental Biology (SEB), United Kingdom, 2007
- Thuringian Science Award of the Thuringian Ministry for Economy, Science and Digital Society, Germany, 2014
- Griswold Lecture, Department of Entomology, Cornell University, USA, 2018
- European Research Council (ERC) Consolidator Grant, 2019
- Elected Member of the European Molecular Biology Organization, 2023
- Honorary Professorship for Evolutionary Ecology at University of Jena, Faculty of Biosciences, 2023,
