= Barbara Imperiali =

British chemistry researcher (born 1957)

- Born: 1 January 1957 (age 69); England
- Education: Massachusetts Institute of Technology, PhD, 1983; University College London, BSc, 1979
- Awards: National Academy of Sciences Member, Royal Society Fellow
- Scientific career
- Fields: Biochemistry, Glycobiology, Chemical Biology
- Workplaces: Massachusetts Institute of Technology, Professor, 1999 – Present California Institute of Technology, Professor, 1989 – 1999 Carnegie Mellon University, Assistant Professor, 1986 – 1989
- Doctoral advisor: Satoru Masamune
- Notable students: Sarah O'Connor, Eranthie Weerapana
- Website: Research site

Barbara Imperiali (born 1 January 1957) is a Professor of Biology and Chemistry at Massachusetts Institute of Technology and Affiliate Member of the Broad Institute. She is an elected member of the National Academy of Sciences and a Fellow of the Royal Society.

== Education and early career ==
Barbara Imperiali was raised in England and attended the Southbank School in Caterham in Surrey, followed by Coloma Grammar School in Croydon where she specialized in studying the sciences. She received her Bachelor of Science in Medicinal Chemistry from the University College London in 1979. She attended Massachusetts Institute of Technology, where she received her Doctor of Philosophy in synthetic organic chemistry in 1983. She joined the lab of Satoru Masamune, working to develop and apply new techniques to synthesize a class of antibiotic chemicals known as ansamycin. As a postdoc in the Masamune lab she worked with the enzyme beta-ketothiolase.

She did additional postdoctoral research at Brandeis University in the laboratory of Robert Abeles, where she received training in chemical biology designing, synthesizing, and evaluating peptide-based protease inhibitors.

== Research ==
In 1986, Imperiali became an assistant professor at Carnegie Mellon University before moving her laboratory to California Institute of Technology in 1989. While at Caltech, she was influenced by the research of Dennis Dougherty, who was applying unnatural amino acid mutagenesis to understand interactions of ligand-gated membrane channels and receptors. Imperiali's work became focused on problems at the chemistry–biology interface, using chemistry to better understand the structure and function of proteins in vivo.

In 1999, she returned to MIT as the Ellen Swallow Richards Professor of Biology. Her research program is focused on protein glycosylation, a process by which a carbohydrate is added to a protein to change its structure or function. Her lab has developed techniques to track and understand how glycosylation at the time of protein production—a process known as translation—affects protein folding and conformation. Applying techniques such as Fluorescence Resonance Energy Transfer and nuclear magnetic resonance, she has elucidated how glycosylation might protect proteins against misfolding and how it affects folding mechanics and thermodynamic stability.

In addition to studying glycosylation, Imperiali has also led investigations into how to design, develop, and apply chemical approaches to understand and manipulate biochemical processes for a variety of applications. Her group has collaborated to develop a fluorescence-based method to detect phosphorylation of peptides and proteins to monitor the activity of kinases, which are enzymes that catalyze phosphorylation and coordinate a vast array of cellular activities. This method can be applied to screen for protein kinase inhibitors and monitor their activities in cells and tissues, enabling tracking of signaling pathways and providing a potential diagnostic tool for diseases like cancers that may result from disrupted kinase-mediated regulation.

She has also authored the textbook Chemical Glycobiology.

== Awards and honors ==
- Elected Fellow of the Royal Society, 2025
- Elected Member, National Academy of Sciences, 2010
- Fellow of the Royal Society of Chemistry, 2006
- Breslow Award for Achievement, American Chemical Society, 2006
- Fellow, American Academy of Arts and Sciences, 2001
- Sloan Research Fellowship, 2003
