= Ernest Guenther Award =

The Ernest Guenther Award in the Chemistry of Natural Products is an American Chemical Society (ACS) award in the field of the chemistry of natural products. The purpose of the award is to recognize and encourage outstanding achievements in the analysis, structure elucidation, and chemical synthesis of natural products, with special consideration given to the independence of thought and originality. The award is granted regardless of race, gender, age, religion, ethnicity, nationality, sexual orientation, gender expression, gender identity, presence of disabilities, and educational background. The award consists of $6,000, a medallion, and a certificate. The medallion is presented during an award address.

The award was established in 1948 by Fritzsche Dodge and Olcott Inc. to mark the 75th anniversary of the founding of the company. Since 1969, the award has been named for their former leader, Ernest Guenther, who wrote numerous works on essential oils. Givaudan acquired Fritzsche Dodge and Olcott in 1990. Since 1992 the award has been supported by Givaudan.

== Recipients ==
Winners of the Nobel Prize are marked with the year of the award in parentheses.

- 2024 John L. Wood
- 2023 Margaret Anne Brimble
- 2022 Sarah O'Connor
- 2021 Bradley S. Moore
- 2020 Tadeusz F. Molinski
- 2019 Iwao Ojima
- 2018 David Ransom Williams
- 2017 Stephen F. Martin
- 2016 Eric Block
- 2015 Thomas R. Hoye
- 2014 Dennis P. Curran
- 2013 Kuniaki Tatsuta
- 2012 Steve Hanessian
- 2011 Robert M. Williams
- 2010 Michael T. Crimmins
- 2009 Peter Wipf
- 2008 David G. I. Kingston
- 2007 Dale L. Boger
- 2006 William H. Fenical
- 2005 Satoshi Ōmura (2015, Medicine)
- 2004 William R. Roush
- 2003 Steven V. Ley
- 2002 John W. Daly
- 2001 Yoshito Kishi
- 2000 Pierre Potier
- 1999 Kenji Mori
- 1998 George Robert Pettit
- 1997 Kenneth L. Rinehart
- 1996 K. C. Nicolaou
- 1995 Jon Clardy
- 1994 Paul J. Scheuer
- 1993 Amos B. Smith, III
- 1992 Leo A. Paquette
- 1991 C. Dale Poulter
- 1990 Barry M. Trost
- 1989 Henry Rapoport
- 1988 Paul A. Wender
- 1987 Wolfgang Oppolzer
- 1986 Clayton H. Heathcock
- 1985 David E. Cane
- 1984 Jerrold Meinwald
- 1983 Karel Wiesner
- 1982 Paul Grieco
- 1981 Samuel J. Danishefsky
- 1980 Sukh Dev
- 1979 James A. Marshall
- 1978 Koji Nakanishi
- 1977 Robert E. Ireland
- 1976 A. Ian Scott
- 1975 S. Morris Kupchan
- 1974 Günther Ohloff
- 1973 William G. Dauben
- 1972 Guy Ourisson
- 1971 Ernest Wenkert
- 1970 Duilio Arigoni
- 1969 John Cornforth (1975)
- 1968 Elias J. Corey (1990)
- 1967 George A. Sim
- 1966 Albert J. Eschenmoser
- 1965 Konrad E. Bloch (1964)
- 1964 Oscar Jeger
- 1963 Arthur John Birch
- 1962 E. R. H. Jones
- 1961 Casimir F. Seidel
- 1960 Carl Djerassi
- 1959 Frantisek Sorm
- 1958 George Hermann Büchi
- 1957 Derek H. R. Barton (1969)
- 1956 Herman Pines
- 1955 Hans Schinz
- 1954 Arthur de Ramon Penfold
- 1953 Max Stoll
- 1952 Yves-Rene Naves
- 1951 Edgar Lederer
- 1950 A. J. Haagen-Smit
- 1949 John L. Simonsen

== See also ==
- List of chemistry awards
