= David G. Heckel =

American entomologist

David G. Heckel (born 1953) is an American entomologist.

== Scientific career ==
After studying biology and mathematics at the University of Rochester, New York, he finished his undergraduate studies with a BA in biology & mathematics in 1975. He received his PhD in biological sciences from Stanford University in 1980. From 1980 until 1999 he worked as an Assistant, Associate and Full Professor at Clemson University, South Carolina. He was a Fulbright Fellow in Canberra, Australia, from 1996 until 1997. Since 1999 he was a Senior Lecturer at the University of Melbourne, Australia, until he became a Director and Scientific Member at the Max Planck Institute for Chemical Ecology in 2003 where he is head of the Department of Entomology. Since 2006 he is also an Honorary Professor at Friedrich Schiller University in Jena, Germany.

Heckel studies the adaptations and mechanisms by which herbivorous insects find and exploit their host plants. He explores how these adaptations interact with other stresses encountered in the environment. A major strategy in his research is to utilize the pattern of genetic variation existing between populations, races, or species; and by mapping the genes and evaluating candidates to identify the mechanisms involved. He also uses this approach to study the genetic and physiological mechanisms by which insects evolve resistance to chemical and biological insecticides, especially Cry toxins (Bt) from the bacterium Bacillus thuringiensis. Additional focus is on patterns of genetic variability in host-races or pheromone-races of insects that appear to be in the process of forming new species.

== Awards and honors ==
- Phi Beta Kappa 1975
- Fulbright Senior Scholar, Canberra, Australia, 1996–1997
- John and Allan Gilmour Research Award, University of Melbourne, Australia, 2001
- Woodward Medal for Science and Technology, University of Melbourne, Australia, 2001

== Selected publications ==
- Tabashnik, B. E., Liu, Y. B., Finson, N., Masson, L., Heckel, D. G. (1997). One gene in diamondback moth confers resistance to four Bacillus thuringiensis toxins. Proceedings of the National Academy of Sciences of the United States of America, 94(5), 1640-1644.
- Heckel, D. G., Gahan, L. J., Liu, Y. B., Tabashnik, B. E. (1999). Genetic mapping of resistance to Bacillus thuringiensis toxins in diamondback moth using biphasic linkage analysis. Proceedings of the National Academy of Sciences of the United States of America, 96(15), 8373-8377.
- Gahan, L. J., Gould, F., Heckel, D. G. (2001). Identification of a gene associated with Bt resistance in Heliothis virescens. Science, 293(5531), 857-860. doi:10.1126/science.1060949
- Asser-Kaiser, S., Fritsch, E., Undorf-Spahn, K., Kienzle, J., Eberle, K. E., Gund, N. A., Reineke, A., Zebitz, C. P. W., Heckel, D. G., Huber, J., Jehle, J. A. (2007). Rapid emergence of baculovirus resistance in codling moth due to dominant, sex-linked inheritance. Science, 317(5846), 1916-1918. doi:10.1126/science.1146542
- Freitak, D., Wheat, C. W., Heckel, D. G., Vogel, H. (2007). Immune system responses and fitness costs associated with consumption of bacteria in larvae of Trichoplusia ni. BMC Biology, 5, 56. doi:10.1186/1741-7007-5-56
- Freitak, D., Heckel, D. G., Vogel, H. (2009). Dietary-dependent trans-generational immune priming in an insect herbivore. Proceedings of the Royal Society of London, Series B - Biological Sciences, 276, 2617-2624. doi:10.1098/rspb.2009.0323
- Lassance, J. M., Groot, A. T., Liénard, M. A., Binu, A., Borgwardt, C., Andersson, F., Hedenström, E., Heckel, D. G., Löfstedt, C. (2010). Allelic variation in a fatty-acyl reductase gene causes divergence in moth sex pheromones. Nature, 466, 486-489. doi:10.1038/nature09058
- Tabashnik, B. E., Huang, F., Ghimire, M. N., Leonard, B. R., Siegfried, B. D., Rangasamy, M., Yang, Y., Wu, Y., Gahan, L. J., Heckel, D. G., Bravo, A., Soberón, M. (2011). Efficacy of genetically modified Bt toxins against insects with different genetic mechanisms of resistance. Nature Biotechnology, 29(12),1128-1131. doi:10.1038/nbt.1988
- Joußen, N., Agnolet, S., Lorenz, S., Schöne, S. E., Ellinger, R., Schneider, B., Heckel, D. G. (2012). Resistance of Australian Helicoverpa armigera to fenvalerate is due to the chimeric P450 enzyme CYP337B3. Proceedings of the National Academy of Sciences of the United States of America, 109(38), 15206-15211. doi:10.1073/pnas.120204710
- Heckel, D. G. (2012). Insecticide Resistance After Silent Spring. Science, 337 (6102), 1612-1614. doi:10.1126/science.1226994
- Beran, F., Pauchet, Y., Kunert, G., Reichelt, M., Wielsch, N., Vogel, H., Reinecke, A., Svatoš, A., Mewis, I., Schmid, D., Ramasamy, S., Ulrichs, C., Hansson, B. S., Gershenzon, J., Heckel, D. G. (2014). Phyllotreta striolata flea beetles utilize host plant defense compounds to create their own glucosinolate-myrosinase system. Proceedings of the National Academy of Sciences of the United States of America. doi:10.1073/pnas.1321781111
