= Empowering Women in Organic Chemistry =

Scientific conference

Empowering Women in organic Chemistry (EWOC) is a scientific conference designed to bring the research and career interests of women in organic chemistry to the forefront and seeks to empower all marginalized individuals by promoting equity, justice, diversity, and inclusion across all chemistry fields. EWOC is the world's largest gathering of women in organic chemistry, and hosts an annual meeting of women (students, post-docs, faculty and professionals) who work or plan to work in the field of Organic Chemistry, broadly defined, from all types of institutions (academic, industry, biotech, non-profit and government).

The meeting goals are to

- Establish a peer group network for collaborating and recruiting diverse talent
- Afford a novel mechanism to provide advice and counsel for women organic chemists
- Share stories from different perspectives about career development and challenges faced – and overcome – along the way
- Establish an inclusive community, with an emphasis on Diversity, Inclusion and Belonging, to engage, network and support each other in the field of Organic Chemistry
- Provide support and guidance to graduate students and post-docs making career decisions
- Provide community support to enhance retention of women in chemistry.

== History ==
The number of female scientists in the organic chemistry community, industry and academics, remains low (<20%). Advancement of women in the chemical sciences is a challenge due to the so-called “leaky pipeline,” wherein growing numbers of women enter academics and industry to study science opt out to pursue alternative careers, some of which are congruent with science while others are outside the discipline altogether. Inspired by the Grace Hopper Celebration of Women in Computing series of Conferences to encourage women to participate in computer science, gender diversity should be a goal across our community and we should actively be looking for opportunities to recognize, identify and retain women in the field of organic chemistry regardless of gender or any other protected characteristic.

To accomplish this goal a group of six chemists founded the non-profit Empowering Women in Organic Chemistry (EWOC) Conferences in 2019. The volunteer-run EWOC conferences allow women leaders to present their scientific research and also allows the participants to hear career stories of how eminent women in the field of organic chemistry have developed their careers and the challenges they have faced – and overcome – along the way. The meeting consists of both science and career topics to provide support and guidance for the next generation of women chemists, as well as provide opportunities for professionals to learn up-to-date science, network and share experiences.

Since 2021, various regional chapters of EWOC have been launched, featuring semi-annual collaborative virtual symposia and other events. Starting in 2023, a group of scientists in Europe initiated the first EWOC Europe Conference, and EWOC Europe has been held in UK, Switzerland and Spain. The EWOC conference also inspired the bienniel Polymer Women Empowerment & Research (PoWER) Conference as a sister conference for polymer science, with the inaugural event in July 2024.

== Conference structure ==
The EWOC Conference structure consists of a combination of scientific presentations, workshops, topical networking sessions, career panel and also includes a poster session. Examples of workshops have included: Cultivate Belonging in the Workplace for Yourself and Others; How to Create, Build and Leverage Networks for Sustained Leadership and Career Success and Cultural Change to Enable Diversity & Inclusion, the Psychology of Selves: Beyond Imposter Syndrome, Leading through Influence, Allies Help Turn the Tide, Take Control of Your Time: Say No, Negotiate, Delegate, and Beyond Pajamas: Coming out of COVID Isolation Mindfully. Examples of topical networking sessions have focused on Work/Life Balance Discussion, How to start an EWOC Chapter, Publishing like a Boss, Creating a Culture of Safety, Interviewing and choosing a company, and various peer networking discussions for graduate students, postdocs, early career faculty, LGBTQ+, Black, Indigenous, & People of Color (BIPOC), and Allies and Advocates, among others. The virtual and hybrid format of EWOC has been cited as an example of the benefits of virtual conferences because they are "more accessible to people who couldn’t otherwise attend because of travel costs or restrictions or because they have family obligations that make travel onerous."

== List of EWOC Conferences ==
Year	Location	Date	Link
2026	Genentech, South San Francisco, California (hybrid)	June 25–26, 2026	EWOC 2026
2025	AbbVie, Chicago (Abbott Park), Illinois (hybrid)	June 12–13, 2025	EWOC 2025
2024	Merck, Rahway, New Jersey (hybrid)	June 20–21, 2024	EWOC 2024
2023	Amgen, Thousand Oaks, California (hybrid)	June 22–23, 2023	EWOC 2023
2022	Pfizer, Cambridge, Massachusetts (hybrid)	June 23–24, 2022	EWOC 2022
2021	Virtual	June 24–25, 2021	EWOC 2021
2020	Virtual	August 13–14, 2020	EWOC 2020
2019	University of Pennsylvania, Philadelphia, Pennsylvania	June 28, 2019	EWOC 2019
