= Trans-2-Phenyl-1-cyclohexanol =

trans-2-Phenyl-1-cyclohexanol
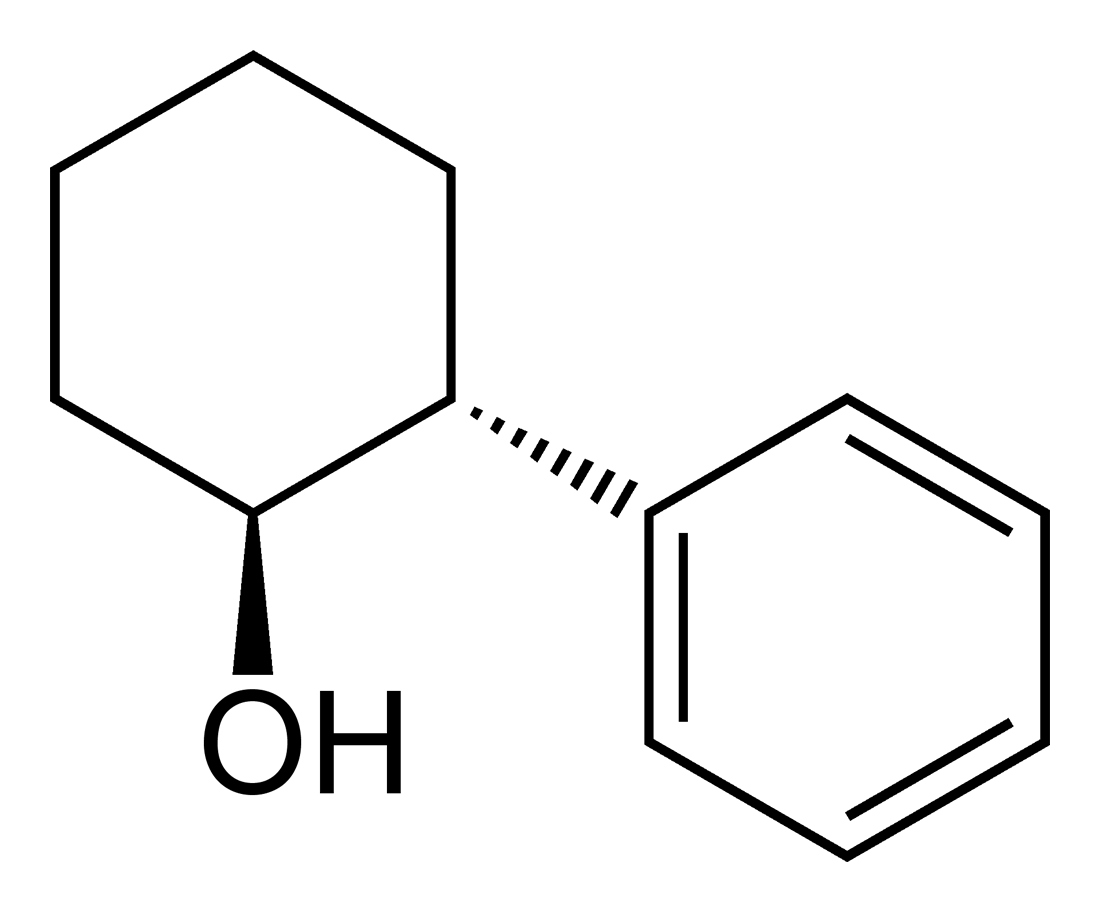
- (1S,2R)-2-Phenylcyclohexanol

Names
- Other names trans-2-Phenylcyclohexanol

Identifiers
CAS Number	(±): 2362-61-0; (−)-(1R,2S): 98919-68-7; (+)-(1S,2R): 34281-92-0
3D model (JSmol)	(+)-(1S,2R): Interactive image
ChemSpider	(+)-(1S,2R): 8074632
PubChem CID	(+)-(1S,2R): 9898975
UNII	(±): 452WZ637M8; (−)-(1R,2S): O5411L8484; (+)-(1S,2R): D2U0RW1Y61
CompTox Dashboard (EPA)	DTXSID30432512
- InChI: (+)-(1S,2R): InChI=1/C12H16O/c13-12-9-5-4-8-11(12)10-6-2-1-3-7-10/h1-3,6-7,11-13H,4-5,8-9H2/t11-,12+/m1/s1 Key: AAIBYZBZXNWTPP-NEPJUHHUBI; InChI=1S/C12H16O/c13-12-9-5-4-8-11(12)10-6-2-1-3-7-10/h1-3,6-7,11-13H,4-5,8-9H2/t11-,12+/m1/s1 Key: AAIBYZBZXNWTPP-NEPJUHHUSA-N
- SMILES: (+)-(1S,2R): O[C@@H]2[C@@H](c1ccccc1)CCCC2

Properties
Chemical formula	C_{12}H_{16}O
Molar mass	176.259 g·mol^{−1}
- Except where otherwise noted, data are given for materials in their standard state (at 25 °C [77 °F], 100 kPa). verify (what is ?) Infobox references

trans-2-Phenyl-1-cyclohexanol is an organic compound. The two enantiomers of this compound are used in organic chemistry as chiral auxiliaries.

== Preparation ==
The enantioselective synthesis was accomplished by J. K. Whitesell by adding Pseudomonas fluorescens lipase to racemic trans-2-phenylcyclohexyl chloroacetate. This enzyme is able to hydrolyze the ester bond of the (−)-enantiomer but not the (+)-enantiomer. The (−)-cyclohexanol and the (+)-ester are separated by fractional crystallization and the isolated (+)-ester hydrolyzed to the (+)-cyclohexanol in a separate step.

The enantiomers have also been prepared by the Sharpless asymmetric dihydroxylation of 1-phenylcyclohexene to the diol followed by the selective reduction of the 1-hydroxyl group by Raney nickel.

trans-2-Phenyl-1-hexanol enantiomers in chair conformations
