= Jonathan Gershenzon =

American biochemist (born 1955)

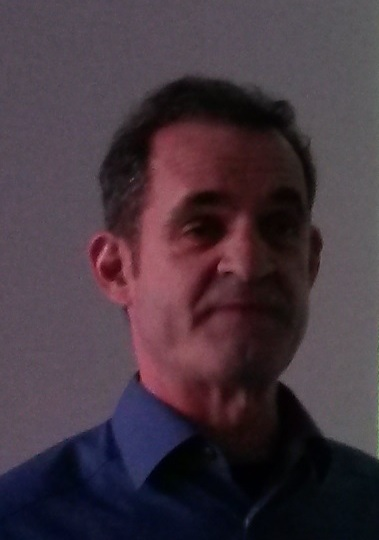
- Gershenzon in 2015
- Born: 1955 (age 70–71)
- Education: University of California, Santa Cruz; University of Texas (PhD 1984)
- Spouse: Kimberly Falk
- Children: 2
- Scientific career
- Fields: Biochemistry of secondary plant metabolites
- Institutions: Washington State University; Max Planck Institute for Chemical Ecology

Jonathan Gershenzon (born 1955) is an American biochemist.

== Scientific career ==
After studying biology as an undergraduate at the University of California, Santa Cruz, Gershenzon received his PhD in botany from the University of Texas at Austin in 1984. From 1985 until 1997 he worked as a scientist at the Institute for Biological Chemistry, Washington State University. Since 1997 he is a director and scientific member at the Max Planck Institute for Chemical Ecology, where he heads the department of biochemistry. He was appointed honorary professor at Friedrich Schiller University Jena in 1999. He is married to Kimberly Falk and is the father of Camille and Julia Gershenzon.

Gershenzon studies the biochemistry of secondary plant metabolites, their mode of action on herbivores, the regulation of secondary metabolisms in plants and the evolution of pathways. Most of the work in his department focuses on two major groups of plant defenses: glucosinolates and terpenoids.

== Awards and honors ==
- National Science Foundation Graduate Fellow, University of Texas, 1978
- Robert A. Welch Graduate Fellow, University of Texas, 1981
- Haarman and Reimer Lecturer, Washington State University 2000
- Duane LeTourneau Lectureship, University of Idaho 2000
- Elected Member of the American Association for the Advancement of Science (AAAS) 2012
- Elected Member of the German National Academy of Sciences Leopoldina 2021
- Elected member of the European Molecular Biology Organization (EMBO) 2024
- Silver Medal Award der International Society of Chemical Ecology 2024

== Selected publications ==
- Gershenzon, J. (1994). Metabolic costs of terpenoid accumulation in higher-plants. Journal of Chemical Ecology, 20(6), 1281–1328. doi:10.1007/BF02059810
- Lambrix, V., Reichelt, M., Mitchell-Olds, T., Kliebenstein, D. J., Gershenzon, J. (2001). The Arabidopsis epithiospecifier protein promotes the hydrolysis of glucosinolates to nitriles and influences Trichoplusia ni herbivory. The Plant Cell, 13(12), 2793–2807. doi:10.1105/tpc.010261
- Pichersky, E., Gershenzon, J. (2002). The formation and function of plant volatiles: perfumes for pollinator attraction and defense. Current Opinion in Plant Biology, 5(3), 237–243. doi:10.1016/S1369-5266(02)00251-0
- Wittstock, U., Agerbirk, N., Stauber, E. J., Olsen, C. E., Hippler, M., Mitchell-Olds, T., Gershenzon, J., Vogel, H. (2004). Successful herbivore attack due to metabolic diversion of a plant chemical defense. Proceedings of the National Academy of Sciences of the United States of America, 101(14), 4859–4864. doi:10.1073/pnas.0308007101
- Dudareva, N., Andersson, S., Orlova, I., Gatto, N., Reichelt, M., Rhodes, D., Boland, W., Gershenzon, J. (2005). The nonmevalonate pathway supports both monoterpene and sesquiterpene formation in snapdragon flowers. Proceedings of the National Academy of Sciences of the United States of America, 102(3), 933–938. doi:10.1073/pnas.0407360102
- Rasmann, S., Köllner, T. G., Degenhardt, J., Hiltpold, I., Toepfer, S., Kuhlmann, U., Gershenzon, J., Turlings, T. C. J. (2005). Recruitment of entomopathogenic nematodes by insect-damaged maize roots. Nature, 434, 732–737. doi:10.1038/nature03451
- Halkier, B. A., Gershenzon, J. (2006). Biology and biochemistry of glucosinolates. Annual Review of Plant Biology, 57, 303–333. doi:10.1146/annurev.arplant.57.032905.105228
- Gershenzon, J., Dudareva, N. (2007). The function of terpene natural products in the natural world. Nature Chemical Biology, 3(7), 408–414. doi:10.1038/nchembio.2007.5
- Wouters, F.C., Reichelt, M., Glauser, G., Bauer, E., Erb, M., Gershenzon, J., Vassão, D.G. (2014). Reglucosylation of the benzoxazinoid DIMBOA with inversion of stereochemical configuration is a detoxification strategy in lepidopteran herbivores. Angewandte Chemie − International Edition, 53(42), 11320–11324. doi:10.1002/anie.201406643

== Video ==
- Video on Jonathan Gershenzon's research (Latest Thinking)
