= Peter Wipf =

American chemistry professor

Peter Wipf is a distinguished university professor of chemistry at the University of Pittsburgh. His research interests focus on the total synthesis of natural products, the discovery of new transformations of strained molecules, and the development of new pharmaceuticals. He is a Fellow of the Royal Society of Chemistry (RSC), the American Association for the Advancement of Science (AAAS), and the American Chemical Society (ACS).

== Education ==
- Dipl. Chem., University of Zurich, Switzerland, 1984
- Ph.D., University of Zurich, Switzerland, 1987
- Postdoctoral Fellow, University of Virginia, USA, 1988-1990

== Career ==
Wipf joined the University of Pittsburgh Department of Chemistry in 1990, and has remained there ever since. He became a full professor in 1997, and a distinguished university professor of chemistry in 2004. In 2001, he was appointed professor of pharmaceutical sciences in the School of Pharmacy. He is director of the university's Center for Chemical Methodologies & Library Development. He has been a visiting professor at the University of California, Irvine, Paris-Sud, the ESPCI, and the University of Eastern Finland.

His research interests encompass synthetic organic and medicinal chemistry, with a focus on natural products, the chemistry of strained molecules, and the discovery of new drugs. He serves on many advisory and editorial boards in the fields of chemistry and pharmaceuticals.

== Publications ==
Wipf is the author or coauthor of over 600 academic publications and a named inventor on more than 50 granted patents. One hundred of his original research publications have been cited over 100 times in the literature, including:

- Wipf, Peter; Miller, Chris P. (1993). "A new synthesis of highly functionalized oxazoles". The Journal of Organic Chemistry. 58 (14). American Chemical Society (ACS): 3604–3606. doi:10.1021/jo00066a004. ISSN 0022-3263.
- Wipf, Peter; Cunningham, April (1995). "A solid phase protocol of the biginelli dihydropyrimidine synthesis suitable for combinatorial chemistry". Tetrahedron Letters. 36 (43). Elsevier BV: 7819–7822. doi:10.1016/0040-4039(95)01660-a. ISSN 0040-4039.
- Wipf, Peter; Lim, Sungtaek (1995). "Total Synthesis of the Enantiomer of the Antiviral Marine Natural Product Hennoxazole A". Journal of the American Chemical Society. 117 (1). American Chemical Society (ACS): 558–559. Bibcode:1995JAChS.117..558W. doi:10.1021/ja00106a075. ISSN 0002-7863.
- Wipf, Peter; Kim, Yuntae; Goldstein, David M. (1995). "Asymmetric Total Synthesis of the Stemona Alkaloid (-)-Stenine". Journal of the American Chemical Society. 117 (45). American Chemical Society (ACS): 11106–11112. Bibcode:1995JAChS.11711106W. doi:10.1021/ja00150a010. ISSN 0002-7863.
- Studer, Armido; Jeger, Patrick; Wipf, Peter; Curran, Dennis P. (1 May 1997). "Fluorous Synthesis: Fluorous Protocols for the Ugi and Biginelli Multicomponent Condensations". The Journal of Organic Chemistry. 62 (9). American Chemical Society (ACS): 2917–2924. doi:10.1021/jo970095w. ISSN 0022-3263. PMID 11671655.
- Wipf, Peter; Ribe, Seth (1 September 1998). "Zirconocene−Zinc Transmetalation and in Situ Catalytic Asymmetric Addition to Aldehydes". The Journal of Organic Chemistry. 63 (19). American Chemical Society (ACS): 6454–6455. doi:10.1021/jo9811827. ISSN 0022-3263.
- Kondru, Rama K.; Wipf, Peter; Beratan, David N. (18 December 1998). "Atomic Contributions to the Optical Rotation Angle as a Quantitative Probe of Molecular Chirality". Science. 282 (5397). American Association for the Advancement of Science (AAAS): 2247–2250. Bibcode:1998Sci...282.2247K. doi:10.1126/science.282.5397.2247. ISSN 0036-8075. PMID 9856945.
- Phillips, Andrew J.; Uto, Yoshikazu; Wipf, Peter; Reno, Michael J.; Williams, David R. (25 March 2000). "Synthesis of Functionalized Oxazolines and Oxazoles with DAST and Deoxo-Fluor". Organic Letters. 2 (8). American Chemical Society (ACS): 1165–1168. doi:10.1021/ol005777b. ISSN 1523-7060. PMID 10804580.
- Lazo, John S.; Aslan, Diana C.; Southwick, Eileen C.; Cooley, Kathleen A.; Ducruet, Alexander P.; Joo, Beomjun; Vogt, Andreas; Wipf, Peter (18 October 2001). "Discovery and Biological Evaluation of a New Family of Potent Inhibitors of the Dual Specificity Protein Phosphatase Cdc25". Journal of Medicinal Chemistry. 44 (24). American Chemical Society (ACS): 4042–4049. doi:10.1021/jm0102046. ISSN 0022-2623. PMID 11708908.
- Ihle, NT; Williams, R; Chow, S; Chew, W; Berggren, MI; Paine-Murrieta, G; Minion, DJ; Halter, RJ; Wipf, P; Abraham, R; Kirkpatrick, L; Powis, G (2004). "Molecular pharmacology and antitumor activity of PX-866, a novel inhibitor of phosphoinositide-3-kinase signaling". Molecular Cancer Therapeutics. 3 (7): 763–72. doi:10.1158/1535-7163.763.3.7. ISSN 1535-7163. PMID 15252137.

== Honors and awards ==
Among many other honors and awards, Dr. Wipf is a:

- Recipient of the ACS Award for Creative Work in Synthetic Organic Chemistry (2023)
- Recipient of the Humboldt Research Award of the Alexander von Humboldt Foundation (2014)
- Fellow of the American Chemical Society (2010)
- Recipient of the Ernest Guenther Award in the Chemistry of Natural Products (2009)
- Fellow of the Royal Society of Chemistry (FRSC) (2004)
- Fellow of the American Association for the Advancement of Science (2002)
- Recipient of the ACS Cope Scholar Award (1998)
