= Ortataxel =

Chemical compound

Clinical data
- ATC code: none

Identifiers
- IUPAC name: (3aS,4R,7R,8aS,9S,10aR,12aS,13S,13aS)-7,12a-bis(acetyloxy)-4-({(2R,3S)-3-[tert-butoxycarbonyl)amino]-2-hydroxy-5-methylhexanoyl}oxy)-9-hydroxy-5,8a,14,14-tetramethyl-2,8-dioxo-3a,4,7,8,8a,9,10,10a,12,12a,12b,13-dodecahydro-6,13a-methano[1,3]dioxolo[8,9]cyclodeca[1,2-d][1]benzoxet-13-yl benzoate
- CAS Number: 186348-23-2
- PubChem CID: 10557575
- ChemSpider: 5293609
- UNII: 8H61Y4E29N
- ECHA InfoCard: 100.158.836

Chemical and physical data
- Formula: C_{44}H_{57}NO_{17}
- Molar mass: 871.930 g·mol^{−1}
- 3D model (JSmol): Interactive image
- SMILES: CC1=C2[C@H](C(=O)[C@@]3([C@H](C[C@@H]4[C@]([C@H]3[C@@H]([C@@]5(C2(C)C)[C@H]([C@@H]1OC(=O)[C@@H]([C@H](CC(C)C)NC(=O)OC(C)(C)C)O)OC(=O)O5)OC(=O)C6=CC=CC=C6)(CO4)OC(=O)C)O)C)OC(=O)C
- InChI: InChI=1S/C44H57NO17/c1-20(2)17-25(45-38(53)61-40(6,7)8)29(49)37(52)57-30-21(3)28-31(56-22(4)46)33(50)42(11)26(48)18-27-43(19-55-27,60-23(5)47)32(42)35(58-36(51)24-15-13-12-14-16-24)44(41(28,9)10)34(30)59-39(54)62-44/h12-16,20,25-27,29-32,34-35,48-49H,17-19H2,1-11H3,(H,45,53)/t25-,26-,27+,29+,30+,31+,32-,34-,35-,42+,43-,44+/m0/s1; Key:BWKDAMBGCPRVPI-ZQRPHVBESA-N

Ortataxel is a drug used in chemotherapy. As of June 2009, Spectrum Pharmaceuticals has the drug in a Phase 2 clinical trial.
