= Bamberger rearrangement =

Chemical reaction

The Bamberger rearrangement is the chemical reaction of phenylhydroxylamines with strong aqueous acid, which will rearrange to give 4-aminophenols. It is named for the German chemist Eugen Bamberger (1857–1932).

The Bamberger rearrangement

The starting phenylhydroxylamines are typically synthesized by the transfer hydrogenation of nitrobenzenes using rhodium or zinc catalysts.

One application is in the synthesis of fenhexamid.

== Reaction mechanism ==
The mechanism of the Bamberger rearrangement proceeds from the monoprotonation of N-phenylhydroxylamine 1. N-protonation 2 is favored, but unproductive. O-protonation 3 can form the nitrenium ion 4, which can react with nucleophiles (H_{2}O) to form the desired 4-aminophenol 5.

The mechanism of the Bamberger rearrangement

== See also ==
- Friedel–Crafts alkylation-like reactions:
  - Hofmann–Martius rearrangement
  - Fries rearrangement
  - Fischer–Hepp rearrangement
  - Wallach rearrangement
- Bamberger triazine synthesis — same inventor
