= Hickinbottom Award =

Organic chemistry award given by the Royal Society of Chemistry

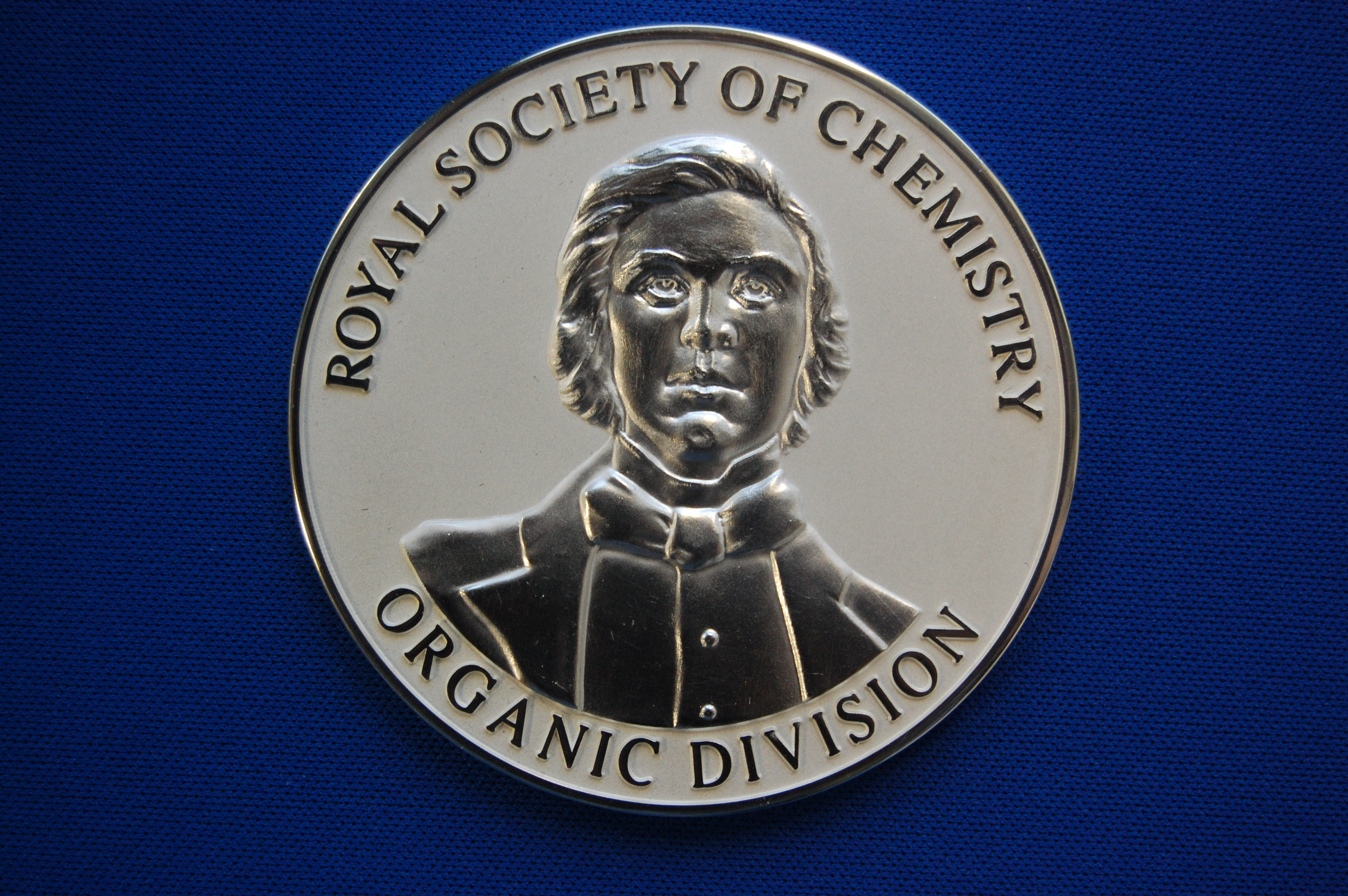
- The 2014 award medal
- Awarded for: Contributions to organic chemistry
- Sponsored by: Royal Society of Chemistry
- Date: 1981
- Country: United Kingdom (international)

The Hickinbottom Award (also referred to as the Hickinbottom Fellowship) is awarded annually by the Royal Society of Chemistry for contributions in the area of organic chemistry from an early career scientist. The prize winner receives a monetary award and will complete a lecture tour within the UK. The winner is chosen by the awards committee of the Royal Society of Chemistry's organic division.

== Award history ==
The award was established by the Royal Society of Chemistry in 1979 following Wilfred Hickinbottom's bequest. Hickinbottom was noted for supporting high standards in experimental chemistry.

Part of the monetary award is the Briggs scholarship, which was funded following a bequest from Lady Alice Lilian Thorpe, William Briggs' daughter.

== Previous recipients ==
The award was first granted in 1981 to Steven Ley and Jeremy Sanders.

Subsequent recipients include:

Year	Scientist(s)	Institution
1981-1982	Steven V. Ley, Jeremy K. M. Sanders	
1982-1983	Eric James Thomas	
1983-1984	Philip J. Kocienski	
1984-1985	Stephen G. Davies	
1985-1986	Richard J. K. Taylor	
1986-1987	Christopher J. Moody	
1987-1988	John A. Robinson	
1988-1989	David Parker	
1989-1990	Ian Paterson	
1990-1991	Timothy Charles Gallagher	
1991-1992	Chris Abell	
1992-1993	David Gani, Philip Page	
1993-1994	Nigel Simon Simpkins	
1994-1995	Richard F. W. Jackson	
1996-1997	Varinder Aggarwal, Susan E. Gibson	
2000-2002	Guy Charles Lloyd-Jones	
2006-2008	Jonathan Paul Clayden	
2009	Gregory L. Challis	
2010	Matthew L. Clarke	
2011	Hon Wai Lam	
2012	Rachel O'Reilly	
2013	Oren Scherman	
2014	Stephen Goldup	
2015	John Bower	
2016	Stephen Thomas	
2017	Andrew Lawrence	
2018	William Unsworth	University of York
2019	Allan Watson	University of St Andrews
2020	Jordi Burés	University of Manchester
2021	Vijay Chudasama	University College London
2022	Louis Morrill	Cardiff University
2023	Matthew Grayson	University of Bath
2024	Liam Ball	University of Nottingham
2025	Mattia Silvi	University of Nottingham
2026	Roly Armstrong	Newcastle University

== See also ==
- List of chemistry awards
