= Matthew Todd (chemist) =

British chemist (born 1973)

Matthew H. Todd
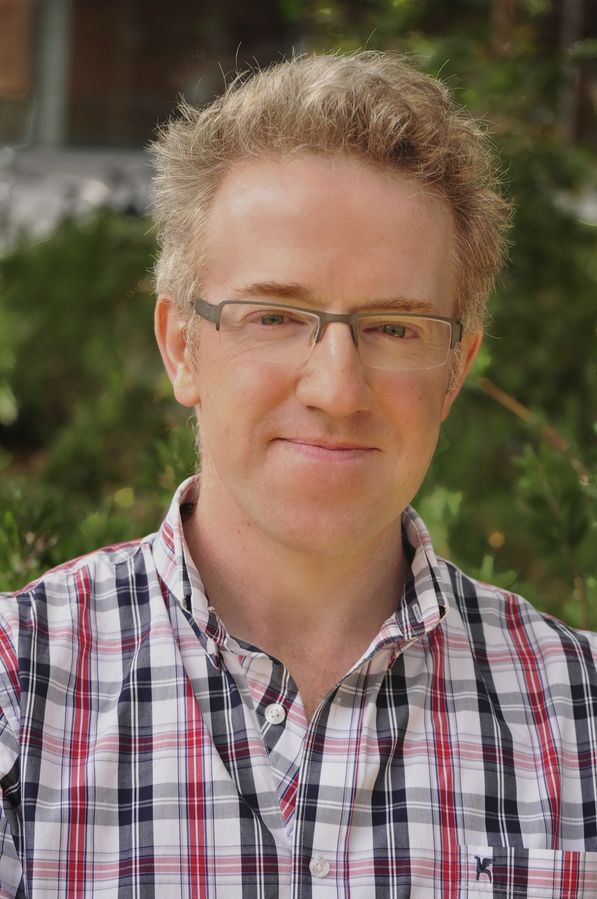
- Born: Matthew Houghton Todd; 13 January 1973 (age 53); Manchester, United Kingdom
- Education: University of Cambridge
- Known for: Open Source Malaria; Open Source Tuberculosis; Open Source Mycetoma
- Scientific career
- Fields: Organic chemistry; Drug discovery
- Workplaces: UC Berkeley; Queen Mary College; University of Sydney; University College London
- Thesis: Novel encoding strategies for combinatorial chemistry (1998)
- Doctoral advisor: Chris Abell
- Other academic advisors: Paul A. Bartlett
- Notable students: Alice Motion
- Website: The Todd Group

Matthew Houghton Todd (born 13 January 1973) is a British chemist and the Professor and Chair of Drug Discovery of the School of Pharmacy at University College London. He is the founder of Open Source Malaria (OSM) and his research focuses on drug discovery and development for this disease. Recently, he has expanded to other areas, particularly neglected diseases such as tuberculosis and mycetoma in the Open Source Tuberculosis (OSTB) and Open Source Mycetoma (MycetOS) project, through a collaboration with the Drugs for Neglected Diseases Initiative and Erasmus MC. In addition, he has some research activity in catalysis and methodology.

== Education ==
Todd received an MA in Natural Sciences from the University of Cambridge in 1995. He obtained his PhD in Organic Chemistry at the same institution in 1999, working with Chris Abell on encoding and linker strategies for combinatorial chemistry. Todd was a Wellcome Trust Postdoctoral Research Fellow at the University of California, Berkeley from 1999 to 2000, working with Paul A. Bartlett on synthesis of amino acid-derived heterocycles by Lewis acid catalysis and radical cyclisations from peptide acetals.

== Career and research ==
From 2000 to 2001, he was a College Fellow and Lecturer at New Hall, Cambridge (now Murray Edwards College, Cambridge). He began his independent research career in 2001 at Queen Mary University of London. In 2005, he relocated to Australia where he was a lecturer, senior lecturer, then associate professor at the School of Chemistry, University of Sydney. In 2018, he returned to the United Kingdom to take the role of professor and Chair of Drug Discovery at UCL School of Pharmacy.

In response to the price hike of HIV/AIDS drug, pyrimethamine (Daraprim), by Turing Pharmaceuticals, Todd and the Open Source Malaria team led a small team of high school students from Sydney Grammar School to synthesise the drug. The students produced 3.7 grams of pyrimethamine for US$20, which would be worth between US$35,000 and US$110,000 in the United States based on hiked prices. This received significant media attention and was featured on ABC, BBC, CNN, The Guardian, and Time.

Todd has been a vocal proponent of open science and open research. In 2011, he proposed Six Laws of Open Research to guide present and future open research projects including OSM and MycetOS:

1. All data are open and all ideas are shared.
2. Anyone can take part at any level of the project.
3. There will be no patents.
4. Suggestions are the best form of criticism.
5. Public discussion is much more valuable than private email.
6. The project is bigger than, and is not owned by, any given lab. The aim is to find a good drug for malaria, by whatever means, as quickly as possible.

Todd is on the Editorial boards of Chemistry Central Journal, ChemistryOpen, PLOS One, Scientific Reports, and Scientific Data.

== Honours and awards ==
- 2011 – NSW Premier's Prize for Science & Engineering (Emerging Research)
- 2012 – Wellcome Trust/Google/PLOS Accelerating Science Award
- 2014 – Blue Obelisk Award
- 2017 – Medicine Maker Power List
- 2018 – Medicine Maker Power List
- 2019 – Medicine Maker Power List
- 2020 – Medicine Maker Power List
- 2021 – Medicine Maker Power List

== See also ==
- Open access
- Open collaboration
- Open innovation
- Open science data
- Open Source Drug Discovery
- Open-source model
