= Stuart Warren =

British organic chemist (1938–2020)

- Born: 24 December 1938
- Died: 22 March 2020 (aged 81)
- Education: Trinity College, Cambridge
- Known for: Organic Chemistry, University-level textbooks
- Awards: Bader Award (2002)
- Scientific career
- Workplaces: University of Cambridge
- Doctoral advisor: Malcolm Clark

Stuart Warren (24 December 1938 – 22 March 2020) was a British organic chemist and author of chemistry textbooks aimed at university students.

== Academic career ==
Warren was educated at Cheadle Hulme School near Manchester and read the Natural Sciences Tripos at Trinity College, Cambridge. He stayed at Cambridge to complete a PhD under Malcolm Clark, before moving to Harvard to carry out post-doctoral research with F. H. Westheimer. Dr. Warren returned to Trinity as a research fellow, and in 1971 took up a post as a teaching fellowship at Churchill College. He remained a lecturer and researcher in the Department of Chemistry at Cambridge until his retirement in 2006. He won the Royal Society of Chemistry Bader Award in 2002. Following his death the RSC produced a themed collection of his work.

=== The Warren group ===
Warren's research group is renowned for having produced some of the most successful organic chemistry academics in the UK, including:

- Professor Nick Greeves (University of Liverpool)
- Professor Varinder Aggarwal, Professor Paul Wyatt (University of Bristol)
- Professor Jonathan Clayden (University of Bristol, formerly University of Manchester)
- Professor Peter O'Brien (University of York)
- Professor Adam Nelson (University of Leeds)
- Professor Kelly Chibale (University of Cape Town)
- Professor Iain Coldham (University of Sheffield)
- Professor Nikolai Kuhnert (Jacobs University Bremen)
- Dr. David Fox (University of Warwick)
- Dr. Lorenzo Caggiano (University of Bath)
- Professor Richard Hartley (University of Glasgow)
- Dr. Julian Knight (Newcastle University)
- Dr. Jason Eames (University of Hull)
- Dr. Daniel Sejer Pedersen (University of Copenhagen)
- Dr. Stephen Thomas (University of Edinburgh)

== Textbook authorship ==
Warren is well known for his university-level textbooks Chemistry of the Carbonyl Group (1974), Designing Organic Syntheses: The Synthon Approach (1978), Organic Synthesis: The Disconnection Approach (first edition 1982, second edition 2008), and its graduate-level sequel, Organic Synthesis: Strategy and Control (2007). He is perhaps best known as one of the authors of the best-selling undergraduate text Organic Chemistry (first edition 2000, second edition 2012), which he wrote with his former students Jonathan Clayden and Nick Greeves, and fellow Cambridge lecturer Peter Wothers.
