= Peter Wothers =

British chemist and author

Peter Wothers MBE
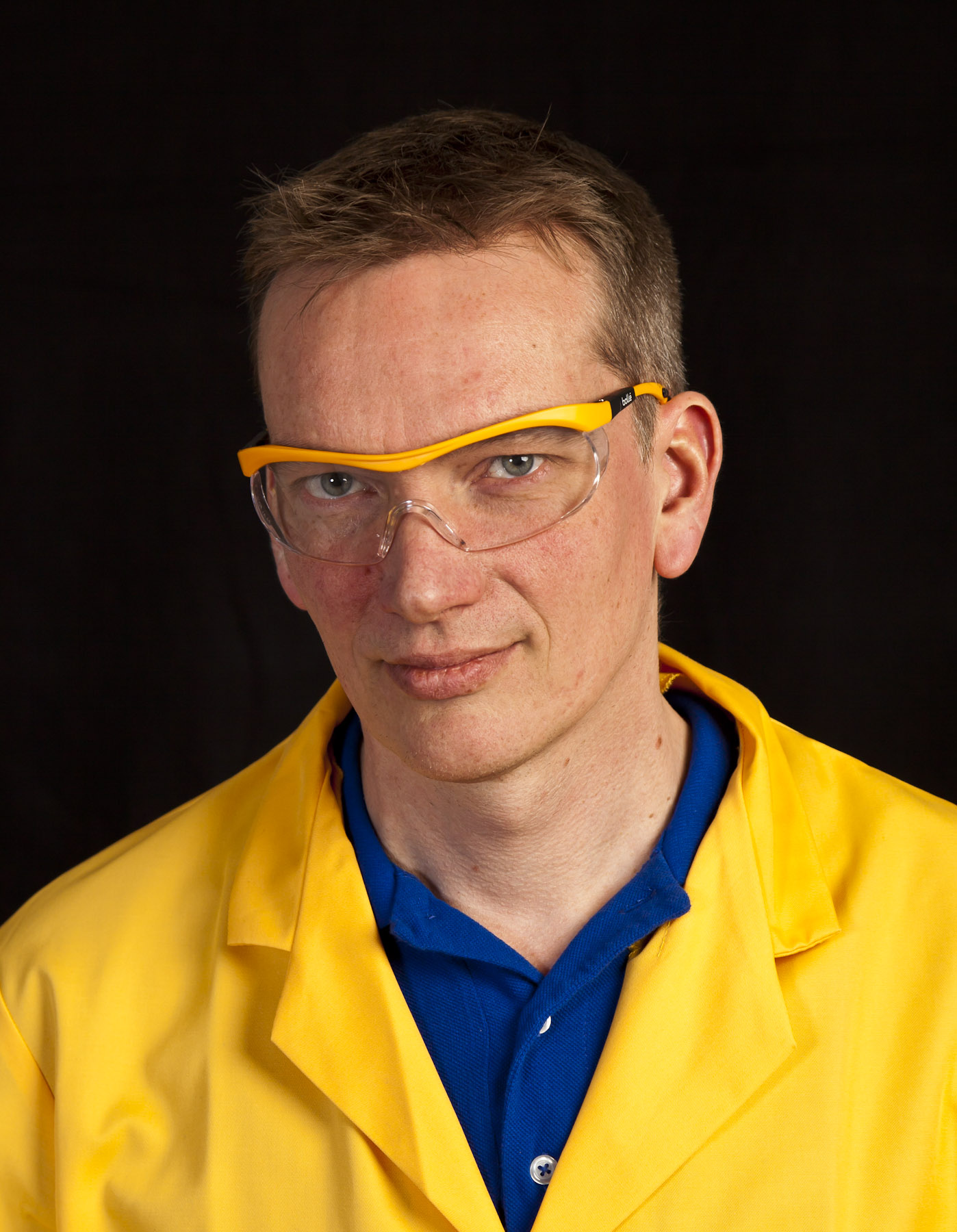
- Peter Wothers
- Born: Peter David Wothers
- Education: Bedford Modern School
- Alma mater: University of Cambridge (BA, PhD)
- Known for: International Chemistry Olympiad; Royal Institution Christmas Lectures (2012)
- Awards: MBE (2014); Nyholm Prize for Education (2013)
- Scientific career
- Institutions: University of Cambridge
- Thesis: An examination of the anomeric effect (1996)
- Website: www.ch.cam.ac.uk/person/pdw12

Peter David Wothers is a British chemist and author of several popular textbooks aimed at university students. He is a teaching fellow in the Department of Chemistry at the University of Cambridge and is a fellow of St Catharine's College, Cambridge.

== Education ==
Wothers was educated at Bedford Modern School and represented the UK at the International Chemistry Olympiad in 1987, winning a silver medal. He read natural sciences at St Catharine's College, Cambridge, where he received his PhD in 1996 for investigations into the anomeric effect.

== Research ==
Wothers has co-authored the first edition of the well-known and best-selling Organic Chemistry textbook together with Jonathan Clayden, Nick Greeves and his fellow Cambridge lecturer Stuart Warren. His two other popular works Why Chemical Reactions Happen and Chemical Structure and Reactivity, written with James Keeler, aim to combine the different branches of chemistry into an integrated whole.

Wothers is also very active in promoting chemistry to the wider public, and has won prizes such as the Royal Society of Chemistry President's Award in 2011 for his outstanding contribution to public outreach, handed to him by the RSC President David Phillips. He has also been responsible for organising the International Chemistry Olympiads for several years and has been chair of the 41st edition.

== Television and radio appearances ==
Peter Wothers has made numerous television appearances as a chemistry specialist, notably as one of the presenters in the Discovery Channel series "The Big Experiment". In December 2012 he presented the series of three televised Royal Institution Christmas Lectures, entitled 'The Modern Alchemist'.

He was a guest on Andrew Marr's Start the Week on BBC Radio 4: the episode was a Science Special broadcast on 17 December 2012. Wothers talked about modern day chemistry and science along with Ewan Birney, Sanjeev Gupta and Helen Bynum who were also guests on the show.

== Awards and honours ==
Wothers was appointed Member of the Order of the British Empire (MBE) in the 2014 Birthday Honours for services to chemistry through the International Chemistry Olympiad. During the same year he was nominated as one of the 100 leading UK practising scientists by the Science Council. He was awarded the Royal Society of Chemistry's Nyholm Prize for Education in 2013.

Wothers is featured as one of the Royal Society of Chemistry's 175 Faces of Chemistry.
