= Coldham =

Coldham may refer to:

== Places ==
- Coldham, Cambridgeshire
- Coldham, Staffordshire

== Other uses ==
- Coldham (surname)
- Coldham Hall, Grade I listed building in Suffolk, England
- Coldham Cottage, Roman Catholic church in Suffolk, England
