= Wallach rearrangement =

Reaction in organic chemistry

The Wallach rearrangement, also named Wallach transformation, is a name reaction in the organic chemistry. It is named after Otto Wallach, who discovered this reaction in 1880. In general it is a strong acid-promoted conversion of azoxybenzenes into hydroxyazobenzenes.

== General reaction scheme ==
The Wallach rearrangement is an organic reaction converting an aromatic azoxy compound with sulfuric acid or other strong acids to an azo compound with one arene ring substituted by a hydroxyl group in the aromatic para position.

Wallach-Umlagerung-general reaction scheme

Conceptually related reactions are the Fries rearrangement, the Fischer–Hepp rearrangement, the Bamberger rearrangement, the benzidine rearrangement and the Hofmann–Martius rearrangement.
In the first part of the reaction, two equivalents of acid tease the oxygen atom away from the azoxy group. The resulting dicationic intermediate with an unusual R–N^{+}=N^{+}–R motif in this scheme has been observed by proton NMR in a system of fluoroantimonic acid and azoxybenzene at −50 °C. In the second part, the HSO_{4}^{−} anion is a nucleophile in a nucleophilic aromatic substitution followed by hydrolysis.

== Reaction mechanism ==
The reaction mechanism for this reaction is not known with great precision despite experimental evidence:

- The primary kinetic isotope effect for the arene proton is close to one excluding the corresponding C–H bond from breaking in the rate-determining step.
- The chemical kinetics of the reaction point to involvement of two protons in the reaction: the reaction rate of the rearrangement continues to increase beyond the stage of complete monoprotonation of the substrate.
- Other kinetic evidence identifies the second proton donation as the rate-determining step.
- The phenolic oxygen atom in the product is not the oxygen atom in the reactant but provided by solvent, based on isotopic scrambling experiments.
- Furthermore, isotope labeling of the N–O nitrogen atom in azoxybenzene gives the azo compound with the ^{15}N isotope distributed over both nitrogen atoms indicating a symmetrical intermediate.

A mechanism not inconsistent with these findings is depicted below:

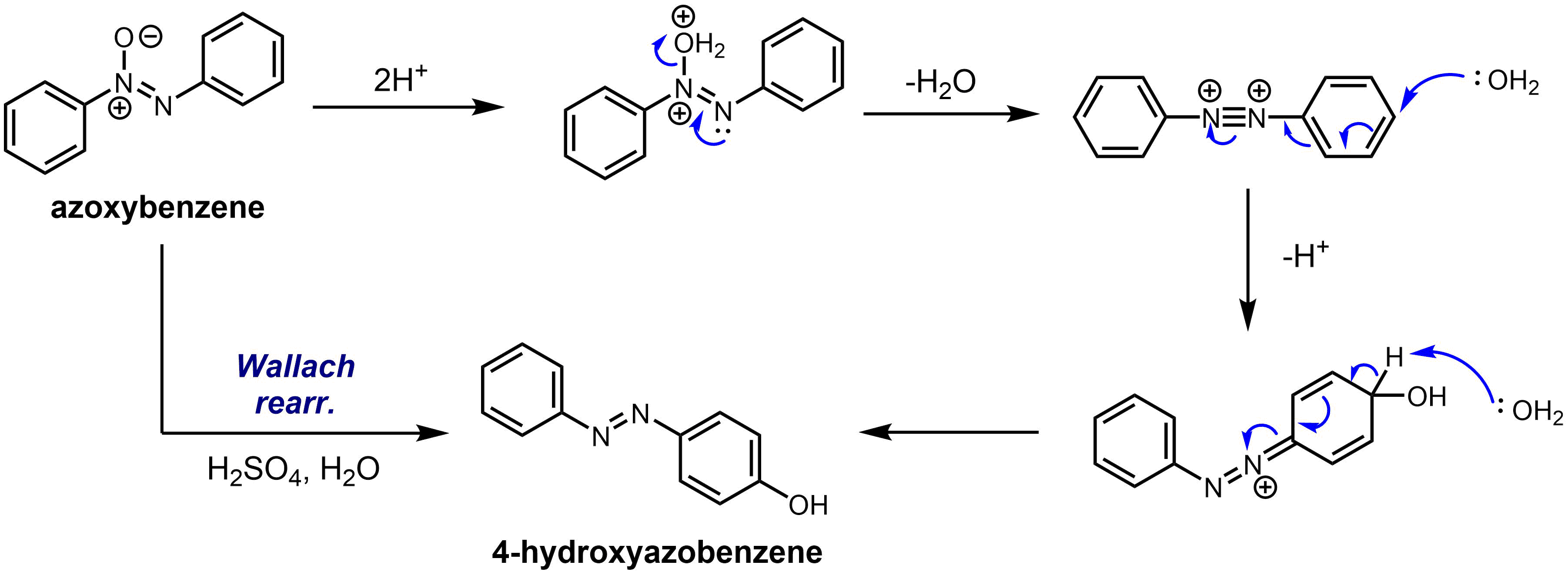
Wallach rearrangement mechanism

First, azoxybenzene undergoes protonation twice to afford a gitionic intermediate. The difficulty of protonating next to an already cationic nitrogen makes this second protonation step rate-determining. Water is eliminated to give the inferred symmetric intermediate, which is again gitionic and superelectrophilic. Water adds at the terminal position to give an intermediate that undergoes two successive deprotonation steps to give the 4-hydroxyazobenzene.

== Applications ==
This reaction has a general application in the preparation of hydroxyazobenzenes and hydroxyazonaphthalenes. They are used for coloration of soap, lacquer and resin.
