= Gaston Julia =

French mathematician (1893–1978)

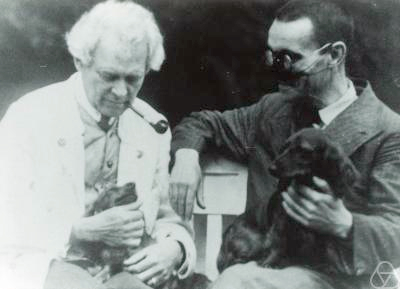
- Gaston Julia (right), with Gustav Herglotz and two dogs
- Born: 3 February 1893; Sidi Bel Abbès, French Algeria
- Died: 19 March 1978 (aged 85); Paris
- Education: École Normale Supérieure; University of Paris
- Known for: Julia set
- Scientific career
- Fields: Mathematics
- Workplaces: University of Paris
- Doctoral advisor: Marie Georges Humbert; Charles Émile Picard
- Doctoral students: Claude Chevalley; Jacques Dixmier

Gaston Maurice Julia (3 February 1893 – 19 March 1978) was a French mathematician who devised the formula for the Julia set. His works were popularized by Benoit Mandelbrot; the Julia and Mandelbrot fractals are closely related. He founded, independently with Pierre Fatou, the modern theory of holomorphic dynamics.

== Military service ==
Julia was born in the Algerian town of Sidi Bel Abbès, at the time governed by the French. During his youth, he had an interest in mathematics and music. His studies were interrupted at the age of 21, when France became involved in World War I and Julia was conscripted to serve with the army. During an attack he suffered a severe injury, losing his nose. His many operations to remedy the situation were all unsuccessful, and for the rest of his life he resigned himself to wearing a leather strap around the area where his nose had been.

== Career in mathematics ==
Julia gained attention for his mathematical work at the age of 25, in 1918, when his 199-page Mémoire sur l'itération des fonctions rationnelles ("Memoir on the Iteration of Rational Functions") was featured in the Journal de Mathématiques Pures et Appliquées. This article gained immense popularity among mathematicians and earned him the Grand Prix des Sciences Mathématiques of the French Academy of Sciences in 1918. But after this brief moment of fame, his works were mostly forgotten until Benoit Mandelbrot mentioned them in his works on fractals in the French book Les Objets Fractals: Forme, Hasard et Dimension, later translated in 1977 as Fractals: Form, Chance and Dimension.

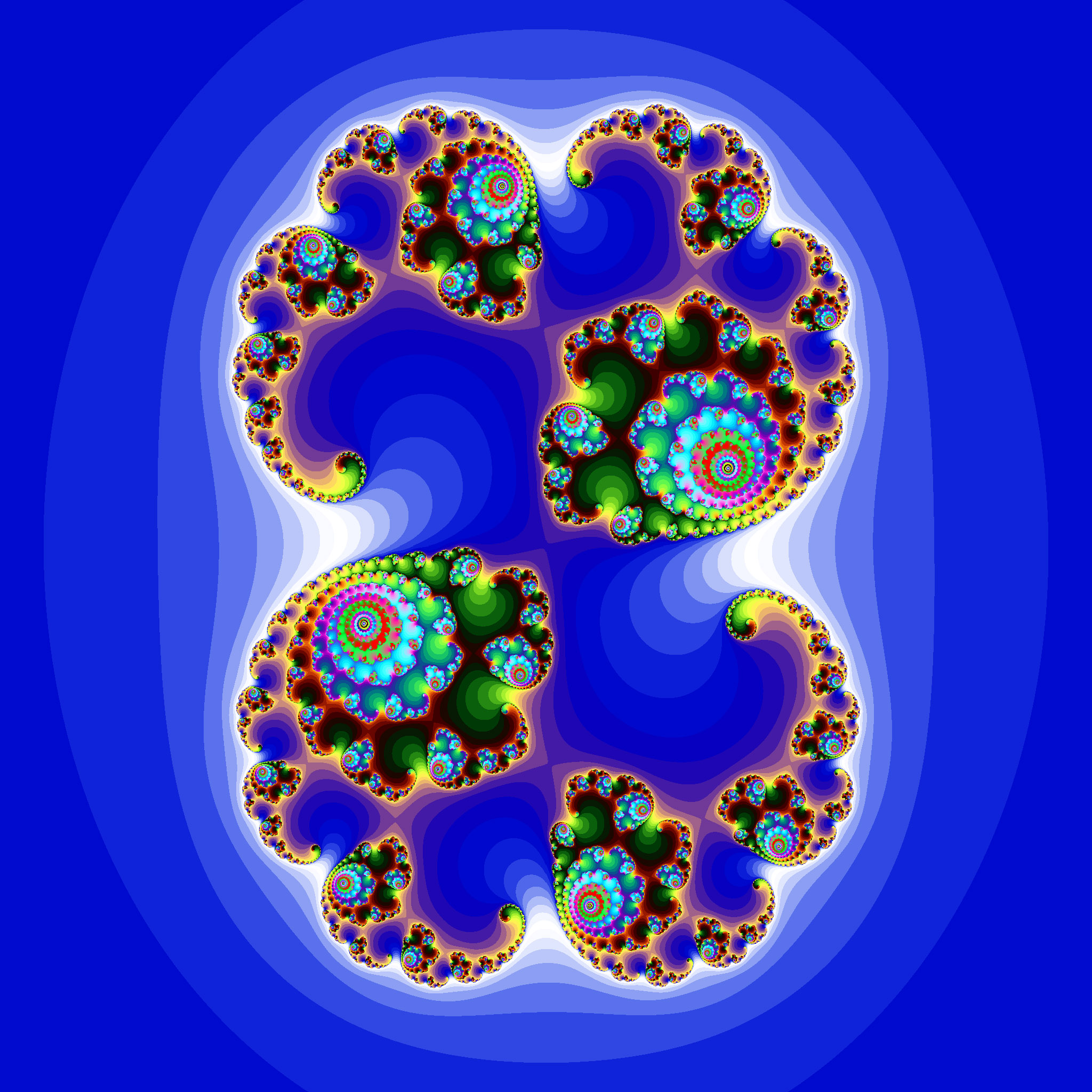
Example of a Julia set (C = [0.285, 0.01])

On 19 March 1978, Julia died in Paris at the age of 85.

Julia was also father to Marc Julia, the French organic chemist who invented the Julia olefination.

== World War II and collaboration ==
Julia collaborated with Nazi Germany during the occupation of France; recruiting French mathematicians to collaborate with the Zentralblatt für Mathematik. He was suspended for a few weeks after the liberation of France, but according to Michèle Audin:

This was followed by no sanction, as the epuration committee was (unanimously...) too impressed by his status of "gueule cassée" to do anything. Then he resumed his normal activities, professor at the Sorbonne and l'Ecole Polytechnique, was president of the Académie des Sciences in 1950, etc.

== Books ==
- Oeuvres, 6 vols., Paris, Gauthier-Villars 1968-1970 (eds. Jacques Dixmier, Michel Hervé, with foreword by Julia)
- Leçons sur les Fonctions Uniformes à Point Singulier Essentiel Isolé, Gauthier-Villars 1924 (rédigées par P. Flamant)
- Eléments de géométrie infinitésimale, Gauthier-Villars 1927
- Cours de Cinématique, Gauthier-Villars 1928, 2nd edition 1936
- Exercices d'Analyse, 4 vols., Gauthier-Villars, 1928–1938, 2nd edition 1944, 1950
- Principes Géométriques d'Analyse, 2 vols., Gauthier-Villars, 1930, 1932
- Essai sur le Développement de la Théorie des Fonctions de Variables Complexes, Gauthier-Villars 1933
- Introduction Mathématique aux Theories Quantiques, 2 vols., Gauthier-Villars 1936, 1938, 2nd edition 1949, 1955
- Eléments d'algèbre, Gauthier-Villars 1959
- Cours de Géométrie, Gauthier-Villars 1941
- Cours de géométrie infinitésimale, Gauthier-Villars, 2nd edition 1953
- Exercices de géométrie, 2 vols., Gauthier-Villars 1944, 1952
- Leçons sur la représentation conforme des aires simplement connexes, Gauthier-Villars 1931, 2nd edition 1950
- Leçons sur la représentation conforme des aires multiplement connexes, Gauthier-Villars 1934
- Traité de Théorie de Fonctions, Gauthier-Villars 1953
- Leçons sur les fonctions monogènes uniformes d'une variable complexe, Gauthier-Villars 1917
- Étude sur les formes binaires non quadratiques à indéterminées réelles ou complexes, ou à indéterminées conjuguées, Gauthier-Villars 1917

== See also ==
- Mandelbrot set
