= Alice Motion =

British chemist and science communicator (born 1984)

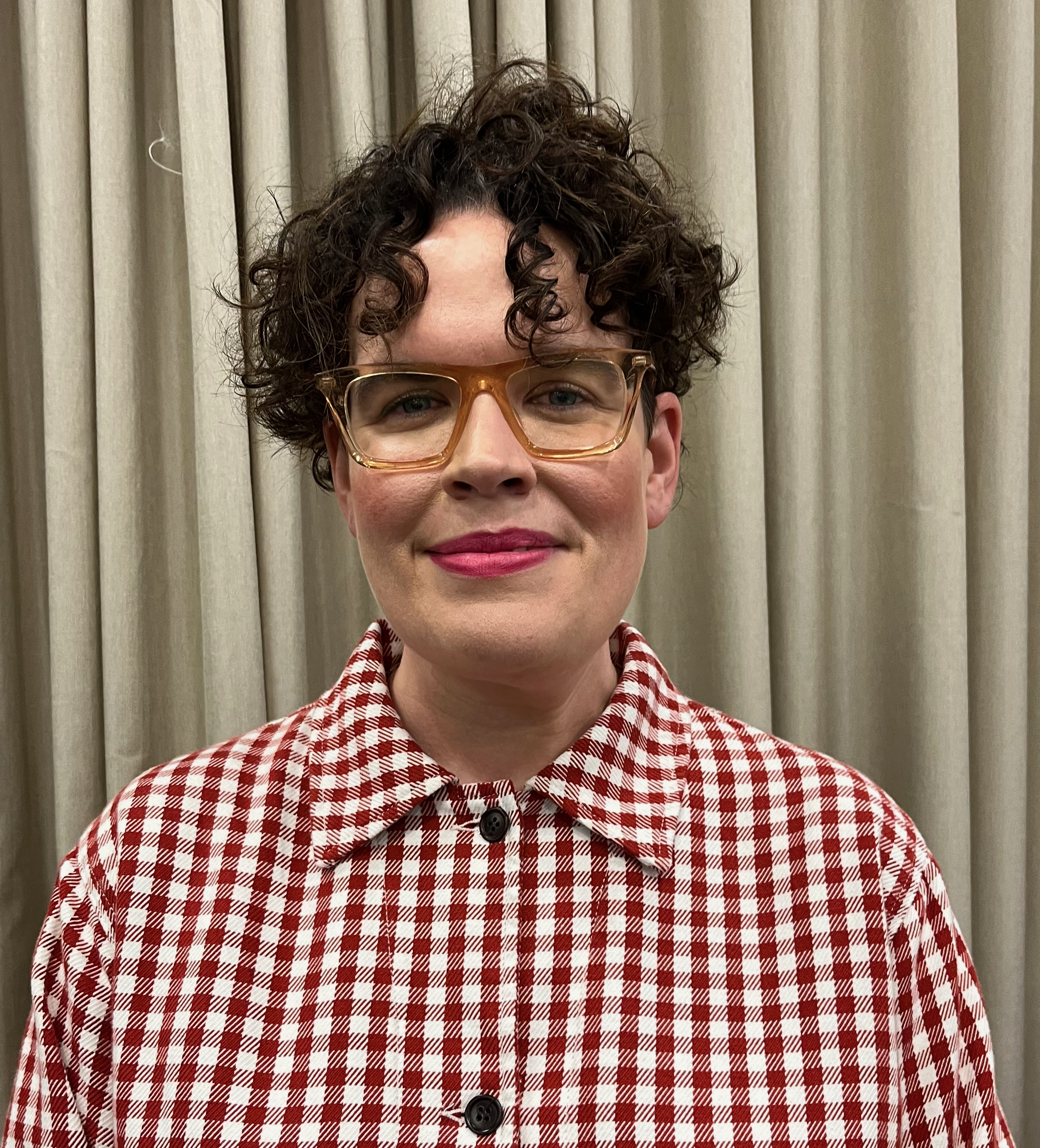
- Motion in October 2022
- Born: Alice Elizabeth Williamson; 28 October 1984 (age 41)
- Education: University of Leeds; University of Cambridge
- Scientific career
- Fields: Organic chemistry; Drug discovery; Science communication
- Workplaces: University of Sydney
- Doctoral advisor: Matthew J. Gaunt
- Other academic advisors: Philip Kocienski; Matthew H. Todd
- Website: www.alicemotion.com

Alice Elizabeth Motion (born Alice Williamson, 28 October 1984) is a British chemist, science communicator, and associate professor at the School of Chemistry, University of Sydney. They (Note: Alice Motion appears to use they/them pronouns as seen throughout their website and other webpages such as their profile on Chemistry World) are the founder of the Breaking Good project which encourages high school and undergraduate students to take part in research that can benefit human health. In 2018, the Breaking Good project was a finalist on the Google.org Impact Challenge.

== Education ==
Motion received their MChem from the University of Leeds in 2007 where they worked with Philip Kocienski on the synthesis of an N-acetylcolchinol-combretastatin hybrid. They moved to the University of Cambridge where they obtained their PhD in 2012 while working with Matthew J. Gaunt on strategies for asymmetric arylation.

== Career ==
In 2012, Motion moved to the University of Sydney in Australia to work with Matthew H. Todd on the Open Source Malaria project as Postdoctoral Research Fellow. In 2014, they became a Postdoctoral Teaching Fellow at the same institution until her promotion to Lecturer in Chemical Education and Outreach at the same institution in 2017.

Pyrimethamine is a pharmaceutical medicine used in combination with leucovorin to treat toxoplasmosis and cystoisosporiasis and in combination with dapsone to prevent Pneumocystis jiroveci pneumonia in HIV/AIDS patients. In 2015, Turing Pharmaceuticals drastically increased the price of pyrimethamine, which it markets as Daraprim, from about US$13.50 to $750 per tablet. In response, Motion, along with their academic advisor, Matthew H. Todd, and the Open Source Malaria team led a small team of high school students from Sydney Grammar School to synthesise the drug. The team produced 3.7 grams of pyrimethamine for under US$20, which would be worth between $US35,000 and $US110,000 in the United States according to Turing Pharmaceuticals's pricing. This received significant media attention and was featured in The Guardian, Time magazine, and on ABC News (Australia), the BBC, and CNN.

Motion, like their former research advisor, is a proponent of open science. They believe that open science and research provides transparency of data and results that prevent unnecessary duplication.

In December 2022 Motion was appointed interim director of Sydney Nano.

== Honours and awards ==
- 2015 – ABC RN and UNSW Top 5 Under 40
- 2017 and 2018 – RACI Nyholm Lectureship: "Mother Nature's Molecules – the good, the bad and the ugly"
- 2020 – Celestino Eureka Prize for Promoting Understanding of Science
- 2024 – Finalist for 2024 Eureka Prize for STEM Inclusion, with the CLOAK team, University of Sydney and University of Technology Sydney

== See also ==
- Open access – Unrestricted availability of scholarly publications
- Open collaboration – Collaboration with a result open to all
- Open innovation – Term for external cooperation in innovation
- Open science data – Type of data available for anyone to analyze
- Open research – Research made available to the public
- Open-source model – Publishing digital resources with their source files
