= Carl Alexander von Martius =

German chemist and entrepreneur

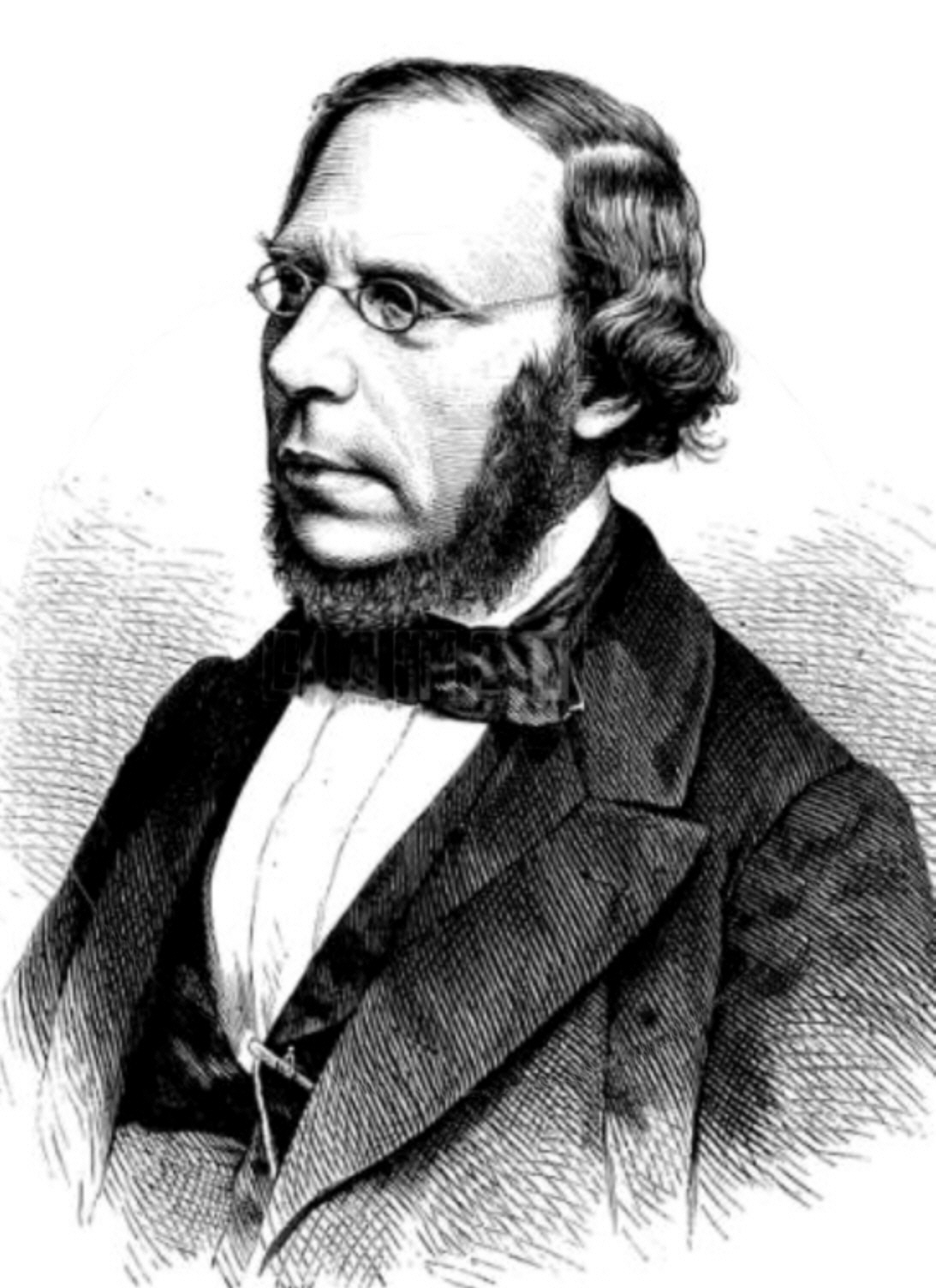
Carl Alexander von Martius

Carl Alexander von Martius (born 19 January 1838 in Munich; died 26 February 1920 in Nonn by Bad Reichenhall) was a German chemist and entrepreneur.

== Life ==
His father was botanist and explorer Carl Friedrich Philipp von Martius (1794–1868) and his mother was author Franziska von Stengel (1801–1843). In 1872, Martius married Margarete Veit (1853–1926). On 16 February 1903 Martius became, by German King Wilhelm II a nobleman.

Martius studied chemistry. At university he was member of student organisation Corps Bremensia. He was a student of Justus von Liebig and university assistent August Wilhelm von Hofmann in Berlin.

In 1863, Martius invented in Berlin azo dye Bismarck brown Y, which he named after german chancellor Otto von Bismarck. It is used in histology for staining tissues. In 1867, Martius invented in Berlin Dinitronaphthol, which was later named after him as Martiusgelb. In Berlin, together with German chemist Paul Mendelssohn Bartholdy he founded in 1867 German company Aktiengesellschaft für Anilinfabrikation (Agfa). Martius was founding member of German organisation Deutsche Chemische Gesellschaft in Berlin and of German organisation Vereins zur Wahrung der Interessen der chemischen Industrie Deutschlands. In 1891, Martius was founding member of German organisation German Association for the Protection of Intellectual Property in Berlin. From 1916 to 1918 Martius was member of Prussian House of Lords.

== Literature over Martius ==
- "C.A. von Martius", Gewerblicher Rechtsschutz und Urheberrecht (in German), vol. 25, no. Beiblatt zu Nr. 4, 1920
- Gothaisches Genealogisches Taschenbuch der Adeligen Häuser, Teil B 1941, page 356, Verlag Justus Perthes, Gotha 1941.
- Norbert Welsch und Claus Chr. Liebmann, Farben – Natur, Technik, Kunst, Spektrum Akademischer Verlag, Heidelberg/Berlin 2003, page 204.
- Acta Borussica Band 10 (1909–1918) (PDF-Datei; 2,74 MB)
- Michael Engel (1990). "Martius, Carl Alexander von". Neue Deutsche Biographie (in German). Vol. 16. Berlin: Duncker & Humblot. pp. 312–313. (full text online).

== See also ==
- Hofmann–Martius rearrangement
- Peter Griess
- William Christopher Zeise
