= Karl Theophil Fries =

German chemist (1875–1962)

- Born: 13 March 1875; Kiedrich, German Empire
- Died: 6 September 1962 (aged 87); Marburg, West Germany
- Education: University of Marburg
- Known for: Fries rearrangement
- Scientific career
- Workplaces: University of Marburg; Technical University at Brunswick
- Doctoral advisor: Theodor Zincke

Karl Theophil Fries (13 March 1875 – 6 September 1962) was a German chemist.

== Life ==
Karl Theophil Fries was born in Kiedrich, Germany on 13 March 1875. After his family moved to Frankfurt he went to school there, but chose to study chemistry at the near University of Marburg in 1894. After one year in Darmstadt University of Technology to improve his skills in electrochemistry he received his Ph.D with Theodor Zincke back at the University of Marburg in 1899. He became a professor in Marburg until the retirement of Theodor Zincke and the start of World War I in 1914. He took part as a soldier in World War I from 1914 till 1918. He became a professor at the Technical University at Brunswick in 1918 and stayed there until a conflict with some Nazi habilitants in 1938. After his forced retirement in 1938 he went back to Marburg where he was able to teach chemistry at the university. Karl Fries died on 6 September 1962 in Marburg and was buried near his academic advisor Theodor Zincke.

== Accomplishments ==
Fries is noted for the discovery of the Fries rearrangement, which is an important reaction used in Organic synthesis.
