= Fischer–Hepp rearrangement =

Organic reaction applied to aromatic nitroso and nitrosamine compounds

Fischer-Hepp rearrangement
| Named after | Otto Fischer; Eduard Hepp |
| Reaction type | Rearrangement reaction |

Identifiers
| RSC ontology ID | RXNO:0000095 |

In organic chemistry, the Fischer–Hepp rearrangement is a rearrangement reaction in which an aromatic N-nitroso (−N=O) or secondary nitrosamine (>N−N=O) converts to a carbon nitroso compound:

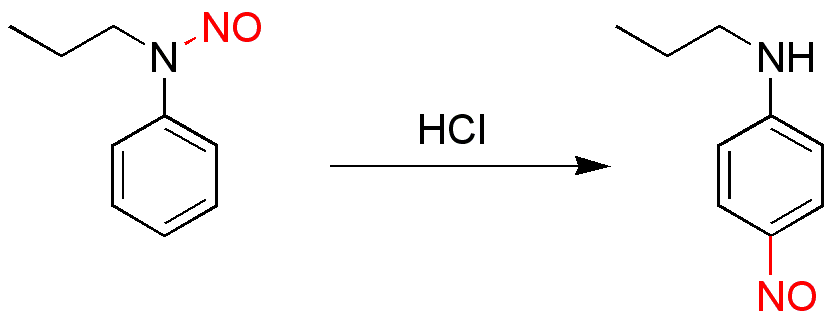
Fischer-Hepp rearrangement

This organic reaction was first described by the German chemist Otto Philipp Fischer (1852–1932) and Eduard Hepp (June 11, 1851 – June 18, 1917) in 1886, and is of importance because para-NO secondary anilines cannot be prepared in a direct reaction.

The rearrangement reaction takes place by reacting the nitrosamine precursor with hydrochloric acid. The chemical yield is generally good under these conditions, but often much poorer if a different acid is used. The exact reaction mechanism is unknown but the chloride counterion is likely not relevant, except in a competing decomposition reaction. There is evidence suggesting an intramolecular reaction, similar to that seen in the Bamberger rearrangement. Nitrosation follows the classic patterns of electrophilic aromatic substitution (for example, a meta nitro group inhibits the reaction), although substitution ortho to the amine is virtually unknown. The final step, in which a proton eliminates from the Wheland intermediate, appears to be rate-limiting, and the rearrangement is also suppressed in excessive (e.g. >10M sulfuric) acid.

== See also ==
- Friedel–Crafts alkylation
- Other S_{E,Ar} rearrangements:
  - Hofmann-Martius rearrangement
  - Fries rearrangement
  - Wallach rearrangement

== Sources ==
- Andraos, John (2000–2012). "Named Things in Chemical Industry" (PDF). Named Things in Chemistry & Physics. Archived (PDF) from the original on 2023-04-07.
