= Nitrenium ion =

Class of reactive intermediate species based on nitrogen and isoeletronic with carbene

Identifiers
3D model (JSmol)	Interactive image
ChEBI	CHEBI:29338
ChemSpider	4574106
- InChI: InChI=1S/H2N/h1H2/q+1 Key: QTLMMXDMXKCANI-UHFFFAOYSA-N
- SMILES: [NH2+]

Properties
Chemical formula	H_{2}N^{+}
Molar mass	16.022 g·mol^{−1}

Related compounds
Related compounds	NH_{4}^{+}; NH_{2}^{−}; N^{•}H_{2}
- Except where otherwise noted, data are given for materials in their standard state (at 25 °C [77 °F], 100 kPa). Infobox references

A nitrenium ion (also called: aminylium ion or imidonium ion (obsolete)) in organic chemistry is a reactive intermediate based on nitrogen with both an electron lone pair and a positive charge and with two substituents (R_{2}N^{+}). Nitrenium ions are isoelectronic with carbenes, and can exist in either a singlet or a triplet state. The parent nitrenium ion, NH^{+}_{2}, is a ground state triplet species with a gap of 30 kcal/mol (130 kJ/mol) to the lowest energy singlet state. Conversely, most arylnitrenium ions are ground state singlets. Certain substituted arylnitrenium ions can be ground state triplets, however. Nitrenium ions can have microsecond or longer lifetimes in water.

Aryl nitrenium ions are of biological interest because of their involvement in certain DNA damaging processes. They are generated upon in vivo oxidation of arylamines. The regiochemistry and energetics of the reaction of phenylnitrenium ion with guanine has been investigated using density functional theory computations.

Nitrenium species have been exploited as intermediates in organic reactions. They are typically generated via heterolysis of N–X (X = N, O, Halogen) bonds. For instance, they are formed upon treatment of chloramine derivatives with silver salts or by activation of aryl hydroxylamine derivatives or aryl azides with Brønsted or Lewis acids. The Bamberger rearrangement is an early example of a reaction that is now thought to proceed via an aryl nitrenium intermediate. They can also act as electrophiles in electrophilic aromatic substitution.

== See also ==
- The related neutral nitrenes R–N:
