= Jordi Burés =

Spanish chemist

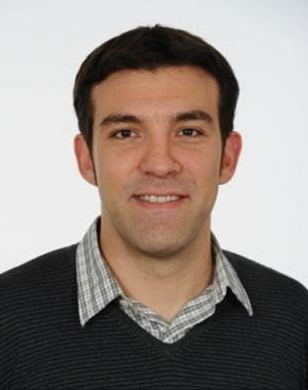
- Jordi Burés
- Education: University of Barcelona(Bsc., MRes., PhD)
- Known for: Mechanistic Studies catalysis Nuclear Magnetic Resonance
- Awards: Royal Society of Chemistry Hickinbottom Award (2020); Young Researcher Award from the Spanish Royal Society of Chemistry (2019); Thieme Chemistry Journals Award (2018)
- Scientific career
- Fields: Organic Chemistry; Physical Chemistry
- Workplaces: Imperial College London; University of Manchester
- Thesis: Aplicació i estudis mecànics de les reaccions de trimetilfosfina i diversos activadors amb nitrocompostos alifàtics, oximes i azides (2009)
- Doctoral advisor: Jaume Vilarrasa

Jordi Burés is an Honorary Visiting Professor in the Organic Chemistry Group of the Department of Chemistry at The University of Manchester. His research in general is on the areas of organic and physical chemistry, specializing in Mechanistic Studies, nuclear magnetic resonance and catalysis.

== Education ==
Burés completed his Bachelor of Science at University of Barcelona in 2003. He then continued to pursue his MRes and his Doctor of Philosophy degrees in the same university with Jaume Vilarrasa and successfully completed it in 2009.

== Research and career ==
After graduating, Burés was awarded a postdoctoral fellowship with Prof. Donna Blackmond at The Scripps Research Institute in California. He later joined the Chemistry Department at Imperial College London in 2013 as an Imperial College Junior Research Fellow and moved to University of Manchester in 2016 as a lecturer in organic chemistry.

His research in general is on the areas of organic and physical chemistry, specizalizing in Mechanistic Studies, nuclear magnetic resonance and catalysis.

=== Notable work ===
In 2016, Burés produced a new simple graphical method to elucidate the order in catalyst, where a normalized time scale t[cat]_{T}^{n} was shown to be able to adjust entire reaction profiles constructed with concentration data. The research further showed that compared to methods that used rates, the proposed method is faster, simple, requires fewer experiments and minimizes effects of experimental errors. This method is generally known as Variable Time Normalization Analysis.

In 2012, Burés, Blackmond and Armstrong led a mechanistic study on conjugate addition of aldehydes to nitro-olefins and the α-chlorination of aldehydes catalyzed by diarylprolinol ether which was able to show that the stereochemical outcome of products of both of these reactions is not determined by the transition state of the step in which the stereogenic center is formed but rather is correlated with the relative stability and reactivity of diastereomeric intermediates downstream in the catalytic cycle. This hence provided evidence to suggest that this concept may represent a general phenomenon for pyrrolidine-based catalysts lacking an acidic directing proton.

=== Awards and nominations ===
- Royal Society of Chemistry Hickinbottom Award (2020)
- Young Researcher Award from the Spanish Royal Society of Chemistry (2019)
- Thieme Chemistry Journals Award (2018)

=== Major publications ===
- Bures, Jordi; Companyó, Xavier (2017). "Distribution of Catalytic Species as an Indicator To Overcome Reproducibility Problems". Journal of the American Chemical Society. 139 (25): 8432–8435. Bibcode:2017JAChS.139.8432C. doi:10.1021/jacs.7b05045. PMID 28613855.
- Bures, Jordi (2016). "A Simple Graphical Method to Determine the Order in Catalyst". Angewandte Chemie International Edition. 55 (6): 2028–2031. Bibcode:2016ACIE...55.2028B. doi:10.1002/anie.201508983. PMC 4797368. PMID 26749539.
- Bures, Jordi (2016). "Variable time normalization analysis: General graphical elucidation of reaction orders from concentration profiles". Angewandte Chemie International Edition. 128 (52): 16318–16321. Bibcode:2016AngCh.12816318B. doi:10.1002/ange.201609757.
- Bures, Jordi; Armstrong, Alan; Blackmond, Donna G (2012). "Curtin–Hammett paradigm for stereocontrol in organocatalysis by diarylprolinol ether catalysts". Journal of the American Chemical Society. 134 (15): 6741–6750. Bibcode:2012JAChS.134.6741B. doi:10.1021/ja300415t. PMID 22452319.
- Bures, Jordi; Armstrong, Alan; Blackmond, Donna G (2011). "Mechanistic Rationalization of Organocatalyzed Conjugate Addition of Linear Aldehydes to Nitro-olefins". Journal of the American Chemical Society. 133 (23): 8822–8825. Bibcode:2011JAChS.133.8822B. doi:10.1021/ja203660r. PMID 21568340.
