= Sphere Bio =

British R&D company

- Company type: Private
- Founded: 2010; 16 years ago
- Headquarters: Cambridge, UK
- Services: Research and Development
- Website: spherebio.com

Sphere Bio (formerly known as Sphere Fluidics) became a brand of Fluidic Sciences Ltd following the acquisition of its business and assets in September 2025. The original company was founded as a Cambridge-based Life Sciences R&D company specializing in biopharmaceutical discovery and development, cell therapy engineering, bioproduction and synthetic biology, analysis and isolation. The company's reported 25 patented products encompassing picodroplet-based microfluidic instruments Cyto-Mine and Cyto-Mine Chroma, biochips, and specialist chemicals was also transferred to Fluidic Sciences Ltd as part of the acquisition.

== Overview ==
Sphere Fluidics was originally established in 2010, by two chemistry professors of Cambridge University, namely, Professor Chris Abell and Professor Wilhelm Huck, Dr. Frank F. Craig, an entrepreneur, and Dr. Maher Khaled, a Cambridge University Enterprise executive, as founders.

== Funding ==
November 2021: Sphere Fluidics raised $40M led by Paris-based Sofinnova Partners and San Francisco-based Redmile Group.

The total funds raised by Sphere Fluidics as of 2021, is reported to be, £46.7 million through various funding rounds, loans and grants.

== Cyto-Mine Technology ==
Cyto-Mine is a patented single cell analysis and characterisation system by Sphere Fluidics. This technology is said to aid the development of biotherapeutics for treatment of cancer and inflammatory diseases and vaccine generation. Cyto-Mine is said to be an integrated device which can automatically perform single cell analysis, sorting, imaging and dispensing into individual wells of microtiter plates in a single compact system.

== Developments and Partnerships ==
In 2019, Sphere Fluidics in partnership with Peak Analysis and Automation (PAA) introduced Integrated Microplate Handling and Single Cell Analysis Capabilities. The addition of S-LAB to the Cyto-Mine provides researchers with a further streamlined solution for single cell analysis in biopharmaceutical workflows.

On 10 November 2021, Sphere Fluidics in partnership with ClexBio gave away 10 CYTRIX microfluidic hydrogel kits containing the novel CYTRIX hydrogel, Pico-Surf™ surfactant and Sphere Fluidics’ Pico-Gen™ double aqueous biochip, giving a plug-and-play system for microfluidic single-cell hydrogel encapsulation, marking the celebration of World Science Day for Peace and Development.

== Awards ==
- 2013 : ACES Life Science Award
- 2015: UK's top 50 disruptive SMEs by Real Business
- 2017: European Product Innovation Award
- 2020: Queen's Award for Enterprise for Innovation
