= Shankar Balasubramanian =

Indian-born British chemist

Professor Sir Shankar Balasubramanian FRS FMedSci
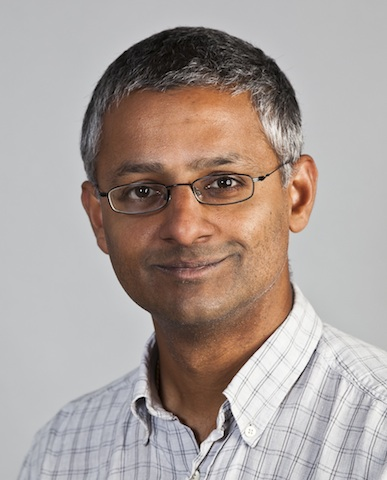
- Born: 30 September 1966 (age 60); Madras, Madras State (now Chennai, Tamil Nadu), India
- Education: University of Cambridge
- Known for: Nucleic acids research; G-quadruplexes; Solexa sequencing technology
- Awards: Corday-Morgan Prize (2002); EMBO Member (2013); Tetrahedron Prize (2013); Royal Medal (2018); Millennium Technology Prize (2020); Breakthrough Prize in Life Sciences (2022); Canada Gairdner International Award (2024); Wolf Prize in Chemistry (2026)
- Scientific career
- Workplaces: University of Cambridge; Pennsylvania State University; Cancer Research UK; Cambridge Epigenetix; Solexa; Trinity College, Cambridge
- Thesis: Studies on the reaction mechanism of chorismate synthase (1992)
- Doctoral advisor: Chris Abell
- Doctoral students: Julian Huppert
- Website: www.ch.cam.ac.uk/group/shankar https://www.cruk.cam.ac.uk/research-groups/balasubramanian-group

Sir Shankar Balasubramanian (born 30 September 1966) is an Indian-born British chemist and Herchel Smith Professor of Medicinal Chemistry in the Department of Chemistry at the University of Cambridge, Senior Group Leader at the Cancer Research UK Cambridge Institute and Fellow of Trinity College, Cambridge. He is recognised for his contributions in the field of nucleic acids. He is scientific founder of Solexa and biomodal (formally Cambridge Epigenetix).

== Education ==
Born in Madras (now Chennai) India in 1966, Shankar Balasubramanian moved to the UK with his parents in 1967. He grew up in a rural area just outside Runcorn, Cheshire, and attended Daresbury Primary School, then Appleton Hall High School (which has since amalgamated to form Bridgewater High School). He went on to study the Natural Sciences Tripos at Fitzwilliam College, Cambridge, where he did his undergraduate degree from 1985 to 1988 and continued with a PhD for research on the reaction mechanism of the enzyme chorismate synthase supervised by Chris Abell (1988–1991).

== Career and research ==
Following his PhD, Balasubramanian travelled to the United States as a SERC/NATO Research Fellow and worked in the group of Stephen J. Benkovic at Pennsylvania State University (1991–1993).

He began his independent academic career in 1994 at the University of Cambridge and has remained there ever since, first as College Lecturer, then University Lecturer (1998), University Reader in Chemical Biology (2003) and Professor of Chemical Biology (2007). He was most recently appointed Herchel Smith Professor of Medicinal Chemistry in 2008.

He currently directs research laboratories in the Department of Chemistry and also the Cancer Research UK (CRUK) Cambridge Institute at the Cambridge Biomedical Campus. His former doctoral students include Julian Huppert.

Balasubramanian works in the field of nucleic acids. His citation on election to the Royal Society reads:

Shankar Balasubramanian is an internationally recognised leader in the field of nucleic acids who is distinguished for pioneering contributions to chemistry and its application to the biological and medical sciences. He is a principal inventor of the leading next generation sequencing methodology, Solexa sequencing, that has made routine, accurate, low-cost sequencing of human genomes a reality and has revolutionised biology. He has made seminal contributions to the identification, elucidation and manipulation of non-coding genetic elements, particularly four-stranded structures called G-quadruplexes. His work on the intervention of nucleic acid function using small molecules has revealed a number of molecular mechanisms that can be exploited, e.g. to modulate the biology of cancer.

More recently Balasubramanian has been inventing and applying new chemical methods to study epigenetic changes to DNA bases including single base resolution sequencing of 5-formylcytosine, 5-hydroxymethylcytosine and 5-methylcytosine.

=== Honours and awards ===
Honours and awards include:

- 1998 Glaxo Wellcome Award for Innovative Organic Chemistry
- 2002 Corday–Morgan Medal and Prize of the Royal Society of Chemistry
- 2009 Royal Society Mullard Award
- 2010 BBSRC Innovator of the Year
- 2010 BBSRC Commercial Innovator of the Year
- 2011 Elected a Fellow of the Academy of Medical Sciences (FMedSci)
- 2012 Elected a Fellow of the Royal Society (FRS)
- 2012 Elected a member of the European Molecular Biology Organization (EMBO)
- 2013 Tetrahedron Prize
- 2014 Biochemical Society Heatley Medal and Prize
- 2015 Chemical Research Society of India Medal
- 2017 Appointed Knight Bachelor in the 2017 New Year Honours for services to science and medicine.
- 2018 Royal Medal
- 2020 Millennium Technology Prize
- 2022 Breakthrough Prize in Life Sciences
- 2023 Elected international member of the National Academy of Sciences
- 2024 Canada Gairdner International Award
- 2024 Novo Nordisk Foundation Prize for Biomedicine
- 2025 Royal Society of Chemistry Khorana Prize
- 2026 Princess of Asturias Award
- 2026 Wolf Prize in Chemistry
