= Kelly Chibale =

Organic chemistry professor (born 1964)

Kelly Chibale PhD
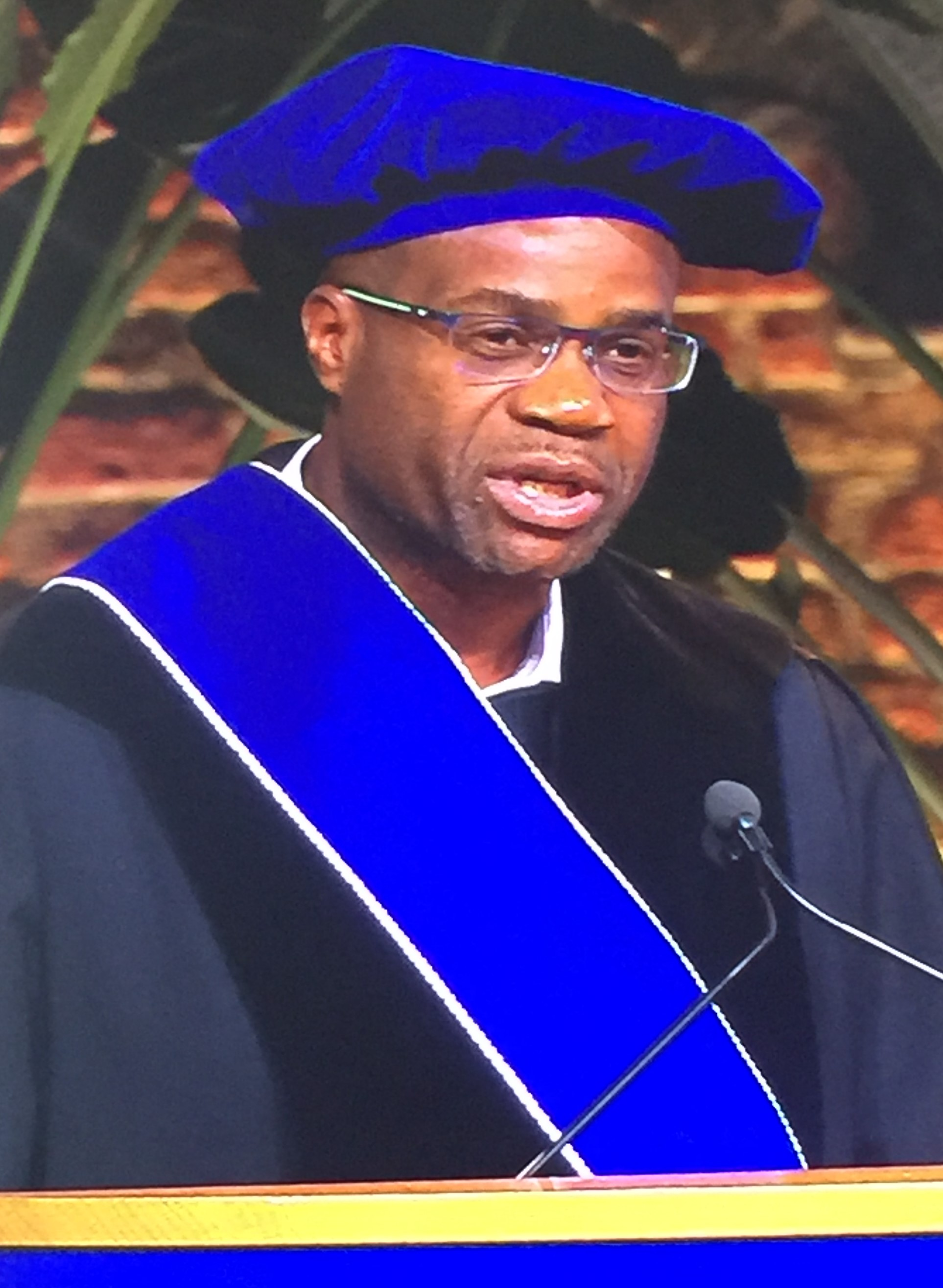
- Chibale (2025)
- Born: 31 March 1964; Zambia
- Education: University of Cambridge; University of Zambia
- Scientific career
- Workplaces: University of Pennsylvania; University of Liverpool; Scripps Research Institute
- Doctoral advisor: Stuart Warren

Kelly Chibale PhD, MASSAf, FAAS, Fellow of UCT, FRSSAf, FRSC (born 1964) is professor of organic chemistry at the University of Cape Town, and the founder and director of H3D research center and H3D Foundation NPC. In 2018 he was recognised as one of Fortune magazine's top 50 World's Greatest Leaders. His research focuses on drug discovery and the development of tools and models to contribute to improving treatment outcomes in people of African descent or heritage.

== Early life and education ==
Chibale grew up without electricity or running water in Muwele Village, Chief Chiundaponde, Mpika district, Zambia. His parents are Elizabeth Malekano Chanda and Harrison Chibale. He studied chemistry at the University of Zambia, graduating in 1987. Chibale worked at Kafironda Explosives in Mufulira. As there were no opportunities for graduate studies in Zambia, he moved to the University of Cambridge for his PhD, working in Stuart Warren's group on synthetic organic chemistry of optically active molecules. He was funded by a Cambridge Livingstone Trust scholarship.

== Research and career ==
Following his PhD, Chibale joined the University of Liverpool as a Sir William Ramsay British Postdoctoral Research Fellow. He developed optically active alcohols using lanthanides. In 1994 he joined the Scripps Research Institute, creating complicated natural and designed molecules from organic building blocks. He began to explore angiogenesis inhibitors, which can be used to stop cancer cells developing new blood vessels. Inspired by medicinal chemistry, Chibale returned to Africa in 1996. In 2002 he joined the University of California, San Francisco as a Sandler Foundation Sabbatical Fellow. He was promoted to the rank of Professor in 2007 and a Life Fellow of the University of Cape Town in 2009. His group currently studies treatments for malaria, tuberculosis, and antibiotic-resistant microbial diseases. He set up collaborations and exchange programs for South African students to learn how to translate basic science into potential products. He was elected a Fellow of the Royal Society of South Africa in 2009.

In 2010 he founded H3D, the first drug discovery centre of its kind in Africa, at the University of Cape Town. The research program received significant media attention and has been supported by Bill Gates. In 2008 he took a sabbatical, working as a Fulbright scholar at the University of Pennsylvania and Pfizer. In 2012 Chibale's group discovered MMV390048, an aminopyridine compound that can be used as a single-dose treatment for malaria. It was the first antimalarial medicine to enter phase 1 human studies in Africa. In 2016 they discovered another antimalarial compound, UCT943. He has written for The Conversation about how Africa's medicinal drug research can paved the landscape for health innovation in the continent.

Today he holds the Neville Isdell Chair in African-centric Drug Discovery and Development at the University of Cape Town. Over the years H3D has partnered with the South African government and innovative pharmaceutical companies to build Africa's capacity for research.

In 2016 the Royal Society of Chemistry recognised him as one of their 175 Faces of chemistry. He was elected a Fellow of the Royal Society of Chemistry in 2014, elected as one of 10 International Members of the United States National Academy of Medicine (2024)^{20}, elected to an Honorary Fellowship of Queens’ College at the University of Cambridge (2024)^{21}, elected as one of 30 International Members of the United States National Academy of Sciences (2025)^{22}, and selected as an American Society of Tropical Medicine and Hygiene (ASTMH) Distinguished International Fellow (2025)^{23}.

Kelly has received many notable awards and honors, which include:

- a 2010/11 National Science and Technology Forum-BHP Billiton Award in the category TW Kambule NRF Senior Black Researcher (2011)
- UCT Alan Pifer Research Award (2011)
- South African National Research Foundation (NRF) Special Recognition Award: Champion of Research Capacity Development at South African Higher Education Institutions (2012)
- South African Medical Research Council Gold Medal (2016)
- Cheney Visiting Fellowship from the University of Leeds in the UK (2017-2018)
- South African Chemical Institute Gold Medal (2018)

Kelly was also:

1. one of the 100 Most Influential Africans by New African magazine for 2019
2. one of the world’s top 60 most influential/ inspirational leaders in the pharmaceutical industry on The Medicine Maker's 2020 and 2021 Power Lists
3. one of the 22 black biotech leaders in honour of Juneteenth in the USA in 2021. The list, published by the Timmerman Report, celebrates innovative black leaders who are change-makers in their respective fields;
4. one of the 25 standout voices in African public health by Harvard University’s Public Health magazine, 12 May 2022
5. the first Editor-In-Chief from Africa of an American Chemical Society (ACS) publication when appointed EIC of ACS Medicinal Chemistry Letters in 2023
6. Awarded Royal Society (UK) Africa Prize 2023
7. Awarded Schmidt Sciences AI2050 Senior Fellowship 2023, one of seven worldwide
8. Awarded Honorary Doctorate of the Faculty of Science, University of Basel, 2025
9. Awarded Honorary Doctorate of the Faculty of Science, Faculty of Social Sciences and Leiden University Medical Centre, Leiden University (Netherlands), 2025
10. Awarded Honorary Doctorate in Biotechnology, Biocomputational, Pharmaceutical and Pharmacological Sciences, University of Bologna, 2026.
11. Awarded Honorary Fellow by the Royal Society of Chemistry, the highest honour the RSC can bestow, given to the worlds most influential scientists, 2026.
