= Chris Abell =

British biological chemist (1957–2020)

Chris Abell FRS FRSC FMedSci
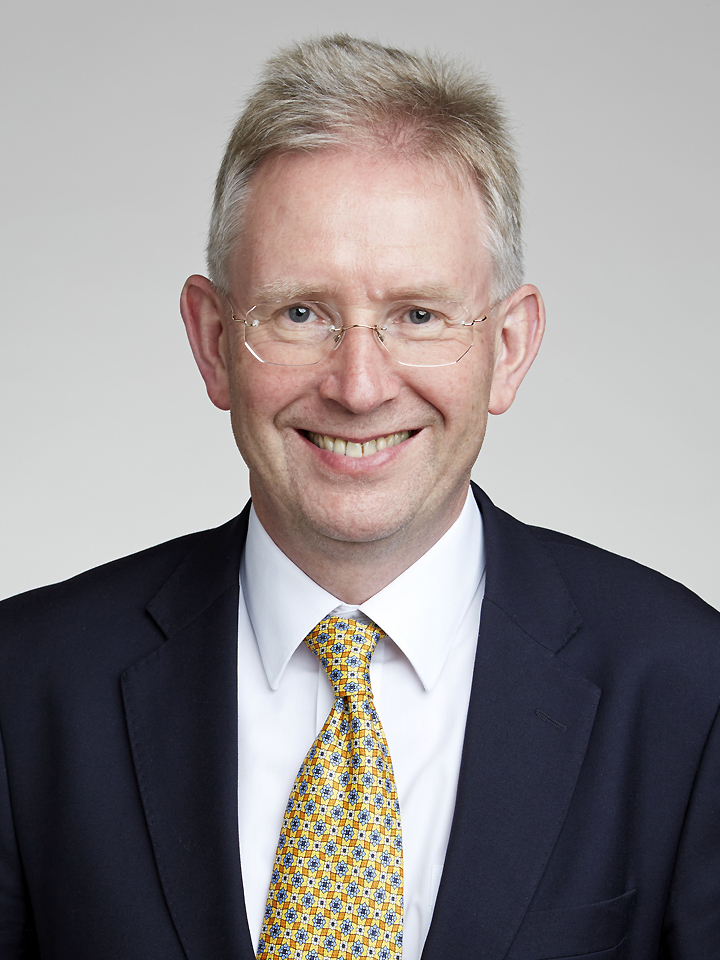
- Abell in 2016
- Born: Christopher Abell; 11 November 1957
- Died: 26 October 2020 (aged 62)
- Education: University of Cambridge (BA, MA, PhD)
- Known for: Astex biosynthesis as targets for the rational design of antimicrobials; fragment-based approaches to enzyme inhibition; and biological nanotechnology
- Awards: Hickinbottom Award (1991)
- Scientific career
- Fields: Biological chemistry
- Workplaces: University of Cambridge; Brown University
- Thesis: Polyketide biosynthesis (1982)
- Doctoral advisor: James Staunton
- Doctoral students: Shankar Balasubramanian; Alessio Ciulli
- Website: www.ch.cam.ac.uk/person/ca26

Christopher Abell (11 November 1957 – 26 October 2020) was a British biological chemist who was a professor of biological chemistry at the Yusuf Hamied Department of Chemistry and Todd-Hamied Fellow of Christ's College, Cambridge. On his 2016 election to the Royal Society, Abell's research was described as having "changed the face of drug discovery."

== Education ==
Abell was educated at St John's College, Cambridge, gaining a Bachelor of Arts degree in Natural Sciences in 1979 followed by PhD on the topic of polyketide biosynthesis for research supervised by James Staunton in 1982.

== Career and research ==
Abell held a research fellowship in the laboratory of David E. Cane at Brown University, Providence, USA, studying terpene biosynthesis (1982–83). In 1984, Abell joined the department of chemistry of the University of Cambridge, successively holding the positions of demonstrator, lecturer and reader in chemical biology, and becoming professor in biological chemistry in 2002. He held visiting professorships at the Australian National University in Canberra, University of Santiago de Compostela, University of Canterbury, Christchurch, and the Paul Sabatier University, Toulouse. He was a fellow of Christ's College, Cambridge, from 1986; and was the college's Todd-Hamied Fellow. In 2013 he was appointed the first director of postdoctoral affairs at the University of Cambridge, and in 2016 was appointed pro-vice-chancellor for research.

Abell published over 200 papers. His research interests include vitamin and amino acid biosynthesis as targets for the rational design of antimicrobials; fragment-based approaches to enzyme inhibition; bacterial and plant riboswitches; reactions in microdroplets; and biological nanotechnology. His former doctoral students include Shankar Balasubramanian.

=== Commercial ventures ===
Abell was the co-founder of several companies. In 1999, he co-founded Astex Technology Ltd, which uses fragment-based drug discovery technology to discover cancer therapeutics. In 2001, he co-founded Akubio, which developed biosensors for detecting bacteria and viruses; it was acquired by Inverness Medical Innovations in 2008. In 2010, he co-founded Sphere Fluidics to develop microdroplet technology. In 2012 he co-founded Aqdot, a company developing a new microencapsulation technology.

== Personal life ==
In 1981, he married Katherine Abell, who worked with him at the department of chemistry in Cambridge; they had a son. He died suddenly on 26 October 2020.

== Awards and honours ==
His awards include the Imperial Chemical Industries (ICI) Prize in Organic Chemistry in 1992, the Hickinbottom Award of the Royal Society of Chemistry, and a Yamada Science Foundation Award. In 2008 he was the MIT Novartis Lecturer, and in 2011 was a BIC International Fellow at the University of Canterbury, Christchurch, New Zealand. He was elected a Fellow of the Academy of Medical Sciences (FMedSci) in 2012 and a Fellow of the Royal Society (FRS) in 2016.

== Selected publications ==
- Ciulli, Alessio; Abell, Chris (2007). "Fragment-based approaches to enzyme inhibition". Current Opinion in Biotechnology. 18 (6): 489–496. doi:10.1016/j.copbio.2007.09.003. ISSN 0958-1669. PMC 4441723. PMID 17959370.
- Blundell, Tom L.; Jhoti, Harren; Abell, Chris (2002). "High-throughput crystallography for lead discovery in drug design". Nature Reviews Drug Discovery. 1 (1): 45–54. doi:10.1038/nrd706. ISSN 1474-1784. PMID 12119609. S2CID 3145020.
- From Microdroplets to Microfluidics: Selective Emulsion Separation in Microfluidic Devices
- Huebner, A.; Srisa-Art, M.; Holt, D.; Abell, C.; Hollfelder, F.; deMello, A. J.; Edel, J. B. (2007). "Quantitative detection of protein expression in single cells using droplet microfluidics". Chemical Communications (12): 1218–20. doi:10.1039/b618570c. ISSN 1359-7345. PMID 17356761.
- Kerbarh, Olivier; Ciulli, Alessio; Chirgadze, Dimitri Y.; Blundell, Tom L.; Abell, Chris (2007). "Nucleophile Selectivity of Chorismate-Utilizing Enzymes". ChemBioChem. 8 (6): 622–624. doi:10.1002/cbic.200700019. ISSN 1439-4227. PMID 17335098. S2CID 37100903.
- Howard, Nigel; Abell, Chris; Blakemore, Wendy; Chessari, Gianni; Congreve, Miles; Howard, Steven; Jhoti, Harren; Murray, Christopher W.; Seavers, Lisa C. A.; van Montfort, Rob L. M. (2006). "Application of Fragment Screening and Fragment Linking to the Discovery of Novel Thrombin Inhibitors†". Journal of Medicinal Chemistry. 49 (4): 1346–1355. doi:10.1021/jm050850v. ISSN 0022-2623. PMID 16480269.
- Bruckbauer, Andreas; Zhou, Dejian; Kang, Dae-Joon; Korchev, Yuri E.; Abell, Chris; Klenerman, David (2004). "An Addressable Antibody Nanoarray Produced on a Nanostructured Surface". Journal of the American Chemical Society. 126 (21): 6508–6509. doi:10.1021/ja0317426. ISSN 0002-7863. PMID 15161251.
- Bulloch, Esther M. M.; Jones, Michelle A.; Parker, Emily J.; Osborne, Andrew P.; Stephens, Elaine; Davies, Gareth M.; Coggins, John R.; Abell, Chris (2004). "Identification of 4-Amino-4-deoxychorismate Synthase as the Molecular Target for the Antimicrobial Action of (6S)-6-Fluoroshikimate". Journal of the American Chemical Society. 126 (32): 9912–9913. doi:10.1021/ja048312f. ISSN 0002-7863. PMID 15303852.
- Webb, Michael E.; Stephens, Elaine; Smith, Alison G.; Abell, Chris (2003). "Rapid screening by MALDI-TOF mass spectrometry to probe binding specificity at enzyme active sites". Chemical Communications (19): 2416–7. doi:10.1039/b308182f. ISSN 1359-7345. PMID 14587709.
- Cooper, Matthew A.; Dultsev, Fedor N.; Minson, Tony; Ostanin, Victor P.; Abell, Chris; Klenerman, David (2001). "Direct and sensitive detection of a human virus by rupture event scanning". Nature Biotechnology. 19 (9): 833–837. doi:10.1038/nbt0901-833. ISSN 1087-0156. PMID 11533641. S2CID 7307876.
- Albert, Armando; Dhanaraj, Venugopal; Genschel, Ulrich; Khan, Ghalib; Ramjee, Manoj K.; Pulido, Rosaline; Sibanda, B. Lynn; Delft, Frank von; Witty, Michael; Blundell, Tom L.; Smith, Alison G.; Abell, Chris (1998). "Crystal structure of aspartate decarboxylase at 2.2 Å resolution provides evidence for an ester in protein self–processing". Nature Structural Biology. 5 (4): 289–293. doi:10.1038/nsb0498-289. ISSN 1072-8368. PMID 9546220. S2CID 7569959.
- Mahapatro, Mrinal; Gibson, Christopher; Abell, Chris; Rayment, Trevor (2003). "Chiral discrimination of basic and hydrophobic molecules by chemical force spectroscopy". Ultramicroscopy. 97 (1–4): 297–301. doi:10.1016/S0304-3991(03)00055-X. ISSN 0304-3991. PMID 12801683.
