= Eugen Bamberger =

German chemist (1857–1932)

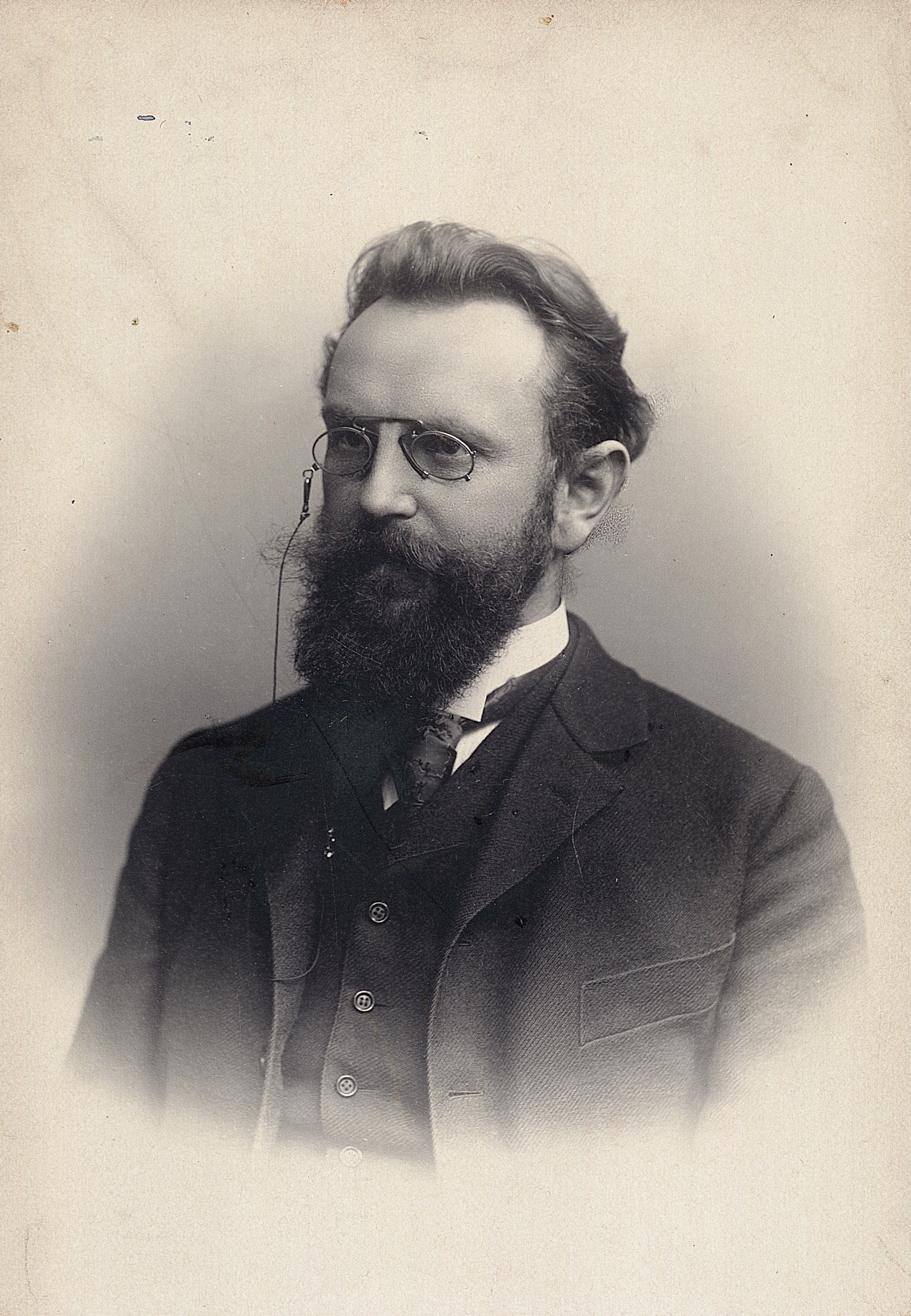
- Born: 19 July 1857; Berlin, Kingdom of Prussia
- Died: 10 December 1932 (aged 75); Ponte Tresa, Switzerland
- Education: Friedrich Wilhelm University of Berlin, Heidelberg University, Ludwig-Maximilians-Universität München
- Known for: Bamberger rearrangement, Bamberger triazine synthesis
- Scientific career
- Fields: chemistry
- Workplaces: Ludwig-Maximilians-Universität München, ETH Zurich
- Doctoral advisor: August Wilhelm von Hofmann

Eugen Bamberger (19 July 1857 – 10 December 1932) was a German chemist and discoverer of the Bamberger rearrangement.

== Life and achievements ==
Bamberger started studying medicine in 1875 at the Friedrich Wilhelm University of Berlin, but changed subjects and university after one year, starting his studies of science at Heidelberg University in 1876. He returned to Berlin in the same year and focused on chemistry. He received his PhD for work with August Wilhelm von Hofmann in Berlin and became assistant of Karl Friedrich August Rammelsberg at Charlottenburg and in 1883 of Adolf von Baeyer at the Ludwig-Maximilians-Universität München, where, after his habilitation in 1891, he became associate professor for chemistry.

The Eidgenössische Technische Hochschule Zürich (ETH Zurich) appointed him professor in 1893, where he stayed until a severe illness forced him to retire from the position in 1905. He suffered from limited control of his right arm and severe headache for the rest of his life. Still, he did research work in a private laboratory at ETH Zurich. In the last years of his life he lived at Ponte Tresa, Ticino. He died there in 1932.
