= Coldham (surname) =

Coldham is a surname. Notable people with the surname include:

- Alan Coldham (1906–1996), Australian tennis player
- Iain Coldham (born 1965), British organic chemist
- John Coldham (1901–1986), English schoolmaster and cricketer
- Peter Wilson Coldham (1926–2012), British genealogist
