= Vicente Talanquer =

Mexican-American chemical education researcher (born 1962)

- Born: 1962 (age 63–64); Mexico City, Mexico
- Education: National Autonomous University of Mexico (UNAM)
- Known for: Research on chemical thinking and learning progressions in chemistry
- Scientific career
- Fields: Chemical education, physical chemistry
- Workplaces: University of Arizona; National Autonomous University of Mexico (UNAM)

Vicente Augusto Talanquer Artigas (born 1962) is a Mexican-American chemical education researcher, physical chemist, and university professor. Since 2000, he has been a professor at the University of Arizona. His work in chemical education focuses on learning progressions, students’ conceptions, and “chemical thinking”. He developed the instructional framework Chemical Thinking and documented its implementation in undergraduate general chemistry at the University of Arizona. For his contributions to chemical education, he has received several international awards, including the James Flack Norris Award (2012), the ACS Award for Achievement in Research for the Teaching & Learning of Chemistry (2021), and the Nyholm Prize for Education of the Royal Society of Chemistry (2025).

== Early life and education ==
Born in Mexico City, Talanquer's parents fled Spain to Mexico as children during the Spanish Civil War. After receiving asylum from the Mexican government, the family settled in Mexico. He attended Colegio Madrid in Mexico City.

He studied chemistry at the National Autonomous University of Mexico (UNAM), earning a Bachelor of Science in 1985 and a Master’s degree in 1987. His master’s thesis in physical chemistry, titled “Sublattice ordered phases of the Griffith’s three component model”, was supervised by Carmen Varea. He then worked as a research assistant at UNAM’s Department of Chemistry until 1988. From 1989 to 1992, he pursued doctoral studies in physical chemistry at UNAM under the supervision of Alberto Robledo. His dissertation was titled “Bulk and interfacial properties of reacting and associating systems”. He received a Ph.D. in chemistry in 1992. During his master’s and doctoral studies, he taught physics and chemistry at the secondary school “Instituto Escuela”, which he co-founded. He also taught physics at UNAM as an assistant professor (tenure-track) from 1988 to 1992.

== Academic career ==
From 1992 to 2000, Talanquer was an associate professor in UNAM’s Department of Chemistry. For the first three years, he worked as a postdoctoral researcher at the James Franck Institute, University of Chicago, under the supervision of David W. Oxtoby. He returned to UNAM in 1995, where he taught and conducted research in physical chemistry. After returning to Mexico, he contributed to the development of national elementary-school science textbooks. From 1996 to 2003, he was a visiting scholar at the James Franck Institute.

In 2000, he was appointed associate professor in the Department of Chemistry and Biochemistry at the University of Arizona, where he has worked since. Building on his background in physical chemistry, his focus increasingly shifted toward chemical education research, influenced in part by his work on textbooks and his interest in cognition and learning. He moved his research emphasis to chemical education, particularly to understanding learning difficulties in science and chemistry. In 2013 he was promoted to full professor and in 2015 to distinguished professor. At the University of Arizona’s College of Science, he was from 2000 to 2015 involved in the preparation of future science teachers and teaches courses on science curricula, assessment, and methods of chemistry instruction. Since then, his primary teaching responsibilities have been instructing general chemistry courses for science and engineering majors.

Within the research community, Talanquer has served on the Chemistry Education Research (CER) Committee of the American Chemical Society (ACS) Division of Chemical Education (DivCHED). He is also a member of the editorial boards of the International Journal of Science Education, Disciplinary and Interdisciplinary Science Education Research and Journal of Chemical Education, and series editor to the book series Advances in Chemistry Education Series. He is a co-facilitator of the IUPAC project “Systems Thinking in Chemistry for Sustainability: Toward 2030 and Beyond (STCS 2030+)”. In 2019 he chaired the Gordon Research Conference in Chemistry Education Research and Practice, and he served as chair in 2022 of the ACS DivCHED.

== Research ==
Talanquer’s research aims to analyze and improve chemistry teaching and learning. A central focus is on the conceptual frameworks and reasoning patterns learners use when qualitatively judging chemical phenomena (for example, classifying or predicting them), and on how these strategies change with increasing expertise. He has studied students’ conceptions of emergent versus additive explanations for properties of reaction products, intuitive heuristics used when judging chemical substances, and learners’ understanding of acid–base concepts. On this basis, he proposed a model explaining common misconceptions in chemistry learning.

Talanquer further refined the concept of “chemical thinking” as a key educational goal. In analyses of Johnstone’s triangle (macroscopic, submicroscopic, and symbolic levels), he described different interpretations of these representational levels and critically discussed their underlying assumptions. He proposed an expanded model of the structure of chemical knowledge to help avoid misunderstandings and to situate research and practice related to Johnstone’s triangle.

In another model, he characterized “chemical rationales”, distinguishing three broad modes of chemical thinking: phenomenological, mechanistic, and structural rationales.

He also developed theoretical models for learning progressions and curriculum design in chemistry. He outlined learning stages in students’ understanding of the structure of matter (particle structure, properties, and dynamics) and derived learning pathways from everyday to expert conceptions. These pathways have been used to design learning progressions that anticipate typical developmental steps in understanding matter and can inform instruction. He analyzed how learners understand structure–property relationships over time, showing that even advanced learners often retain simplifying schemas. Building on this work, he proposed a framework for chemistry teaching that describes likely developmental trajectories of chemical thinking from grade 8 through university education. Talanquer defines chemical thinking as the ability to apply chemical knowledge and scientific practices to analyze, synthesize, and transform matter for problem solving. His instructional framework Chemical Thinking argues that chemistry should be taught in ways that reflect how experts think. He documented the redesign of the University of Arizona’s large-enrollment general chemistry courses around this framework. The reform produced small but statistically significant improvements in student outcomes and reduced some achievement gaps between genders and ethnic groups, while involving substantial implementation challenges.

In the context of sustainable development goals, Talanquer emphasizes the role of chemistry education in enabling learners to critically reflect on their world and to apply chemical knowledge to social and environmental questions. He highlights the importance of “eco-reflexive” thinking and action, in which chemical problems are examined from moral–philosophical, societal, and ecological perspectives.

== Awards and honors ==
A key focus of his public recognition lies on contributions to chemistry and natural science education, which is reflected in several national and international teaching and research awards. In 2020, he received an honour from the Faculty of Chemistry at the National Autonomous University of Mexico.

- 2025: Nyholm Prize for Education (Royal Society of Chemistry)
- 2021: ACS Award for Achievement in Research for the Teaching & Learning of Chemistry (American Chemical Society)
- 2019: CSSP Educational Research Award (Council of Scientific Society Presidents)
- 2015: Arizona Professor of the Year (Carnegie Foundation)
- 2012: James Flack Norris Award for Outstanding Achievement in the Teaching of Chemistry (Northeastern Section of the American Chemical Society)
- 2012: Henry and Phyllis Koffler Prize in Teaching (University of Arizona)
- 2007: Leicester & Kathryn Sherrill Creative Teaching Award (University of Arizona)
- 2006: Five-Star Teaching Award (University of Arizona)
- 2004: Early-Career Teaching Award (College of Science, University of Arizona)
- 1998: Outstanding Young Professor in Physical Sciences Education (UNAM)

== Selected publications ==
Talanquer has published more than 150 peer-reviewed articles and over ten textbooks; four of these are used nationwide in Mexico as elementary-school science textbooks.

- Sevian, Hannah; Talanquer, Vicente (2014). "Rethinking chemistry: a learning progression on chemical thinking". Chem. Educ. Res. Pract. 15 (1): 10–23. doi:10.1039/C3RP00111C.
- Talanquer, Vicente (15 January 2011). "Macro, Submicro, and Symbolic: The many faces of the chemistry "triplet"". International Journal of Science Education. 33 (2): 179–195. doi:10.1080/09500690903386435.
- Talanquer, Vicente; Pollard, John (2010). "Let's teach how we think instead of what we know". Chem. Educ. Res. Pract. 11 (2): 74–83. doi:10.1039/C005349J.
- Talanquer, Vicente (4 June 2007). "Explanations and Teleology in Chemistry Education". International Journal of Science Education. 29 (7): 853–870. doi:10.1080/09500690601087632.
- Talanquer, Vicente (May 2006). "Commonsense Chemistry: A Model for Understanding Students' Alternative Conceptions". Journal of Chemical Education. 83 (5): 811. doi:10.1021/ed083p811.
- Talanquer, Vicente; Oxtoby, David W. (1 July 1998). "Crystal nucleation in the presence of a metastable critical point". The Journal of Chemical Physics. 109 (1): 223–227. doi:10.1063/1.476554.
