= Bamberger triazine synthesis =

Synthesis in oprganic chemistry

The Bamberger triazine synthesis in organic chemistry is a classic organic synthesis of a triazine first reported by Eugen Bamberger in 1892.

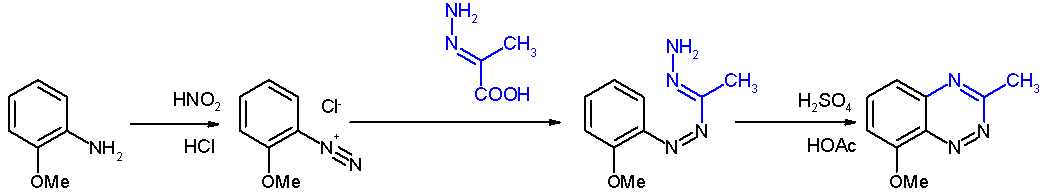
Bamberger triazine synthesis

The reactants are an aryl diazonium salt obtained from reaction of the corresponding aniline with sodium nitrite and hydrochloric acid and the hydrazone of pyruvic acid. The azo intermediate converts to the benzotriazine in the third step with sulfuric acid in acetic acid.

== See also ==
- From the same chemist: the Bamberger rearrangement
