= Wilfred Hickinbottom =

English chemist

- Born: 1896
- Died: 1979 (aged 82–83)
- Education: University of Birmingham
- Spouse: Greta Parkinson (m. 1953)
- Scientific career
- Institutions: University of Birmingham, Queen Mary College
- Doctoral advisor: G. T. Morgan

Wilfred John Hickinbottom FRIC (1896–1979) was an English chemist. He was educated at King Edward's School, Birmingham and went on to study chemistry at the University of Birmingham, graduating with first class honours in 1921. During this time he first reported what came to be known as the Reilly–Hickinbottom rearrangement. He then went on to complete a PhD under Professor G. T. Morgan.

== Career ==
Title page of his book

After completing his PhD, he was appointed as an assistant lecturer in 1924 and then promoted to lecturer in 1927 at the University of Birmingham. Hickinbottom was a reader at Queen Mary University of London (at the time named Queen Mary College) between 1947–1960 and then professor from 1960 to 1963. He later became a visiting professor at the University of Khartoum. He married the professional pianist Greta Parkinson in 1953.

Hickinbottom wrote a textbook, Reactions of Organic Compounds. it was first published in 1936, with a second edition in 1945 and a third in 1957.

He left a bequest to the Royal Society of Chemistry to fund the Hickinbottom Award.
