= Nyholm Prize for Education =

Biannual Royal Society of Chemistry award

- Awarded for: Contributions to chemical science education
- Sponsored by: Royal Society of Chemistry
- Date: 1973
- Country: United Kingdom (international)
- Formerly called: Sir Ronald Nyholm Lectureship (Education Division)
- Reward: £5000
- Website: Official website

The Nyholm Prize for Education commemorates the life and work of Australian-born chemist Sir Ronald Nyholm, who – alongside his research in coordination chemistry – passionately campaigned for the improvement of science education. He acted as president of the Royal Society of Chemistry from 1968 to 1970.

The prize, which was first awarded in 1973, is awarded biennially by the Royal Society of Chemistry. It recognises outstanding achievements by those working in chemical science education, specifically major contributions to national or international research or innovation.

Before 2008, the prize was known as the Sir Ronald Nyholm Lectureship (Education Division). The recipient receives £5,000, a medal and a certificate.

== Recipients ==
The recipients are:

- 1973/74 – H F Halliwell
- 1975/76 – Douglas James Millen
- 1977/78 – A K Holliday
- 1979/80 – A H Johnstone
- 1981/82 – M J Frazer
- 1982/83 – Peter J Fensham
- 1984/85 – Professor David J Waddington
- 1986/87 – M H Gardner
- 1988/89 – No award
- 1990/91 – R F Kempa
- 1992/93 – M Gomel
- 1994/95 – David Phillips
- 1996/97 – C. John Garratt
- 1998/99 – Peter Atkins
- 2000/01 – Patrick D Bailey
- 2002/03 – George M Bodner
- 2004/05 – Zafra M. Lerman
- 2006/07 – Norman Reid
- 2008/09 – David D Kumar
- 2009 – Tina Overton
- 2011 – Martyn Poliakoff
- 2013 – Peter Wothers
- 2015 – Nick Greeves
- 2017 – Dudley Shallcross, University of Bristol
- 2019 – Marcy Towns, Purdue University
- 2021 – Michael Seery, The Open University
- 2023 – Savita Ladage, Tata Institute of Fundamental Research
- 2025 – Vicente Talanquer, University of Arizona

== See also ==
- List of chemistry awards
