= Philip Kocienski =

British organic chemist

- Born: 1946 (age 79–80); Troy, New York
- Education: Northeastern University; Brown University (PhD)
- Awards: FRS (1997); Marie Curie Medal (1997); Tilden Prize (1992); Hickinbottom Award (1983)
- Scientific career
- Fields: organic chemistry
- Workplaces: MIT; University of Southampton; University of Glasgow; University of Leeds; Binghamton University
- Thesis: Part I : The reactions of Di-t-butylcyclopropenyl cations with nucleophiles. Part II : The peracid oxidation of cyclopropenes (1972)
- Doctoral advisor: Joseph Ciabattoni
- Notable students: Alice Motion

Philip Joseph Kocienski FRS (born 23 December 1946) is a British organic chemist. He is an Emeritus Professor at the University of Leeds.

== Research ==
Kocienski has made contributions to the design and development of new organometallic reagents in synthesis, and the applications of synthetic methods to complex natural products. Early work with Basil Lythgoe on the scope and stereochemistry of the Julia olefination with alpha-metallated sulphone reagents emphasised the value of this method in organic chemistry. His major contribution has been to research the synthesis and chemistry of novel metallated (lithium, copper and nickel) enol ethers, and to develop the uses of these intermediates in the synthesis of oxacyclic and geometrically defined alkene units in natural products of biological significance. Kocienski has synthesised the insecticide milbemycin beta 3, the potassium channel blocker talaromycin B, the hypotensive agent lacrimin, and the antihypertensive agent zoapatanol. His total synthesis of the insect toxin pederin, and his synthetic work toward the immunosuppressant FK 506, have made him regarded as one of the leading organic chemists in the field.

== Awards and honours ==
In 1984 Kocienski received the Hickinbottom Fellowship of the Royal Society of Chemistry. He was elected a Fellow of the Royal Society (FRS) in 1997. He won the Marie Curie Medal in 1997. Since 2000 he has been a foreign member of Polish Academy of Sciences.
