= Varinder Aggarwal =

British organic chemist

Varinder Kumar Aggarwal FRS
- Born: 1961 (age 64–65); Kalianpur, Uttar Pradesh, India
- Education: University of Cambridge (BA, PhD)
- Awards: Corday-Morgan Prize (1998); Green Chemistry Award (2003); Organic Stereochemistry Award (2009); FRS (2012); Perkin Prize (2013); Davy Medal (2019)
- Scientific career
- Fields: Organic chemistry Asymmetric synthesis
- Institutions: University of Sheffield; University of Bristol
- Thesis: Stereocontrolled synthesis with phenylthio migration (1986)
- Doctoral advisor: Stuart Warren

Varinder Kumar Aggarwal FRS FRSC (born 1961) is an Indian organic chemist specialising in asymmetric synthesis. He is a Professor of Synthetic Chemistry at the School of Chemistry of the University of Bristol.

== Early life ==
Aggarwal was born in 1961 in Kalianpur, a town in Northern India. In 1963 his family emigrated to the United Kingdom. He was one of six sons, and grew up in Scotland, then Nottingham, England.

== Education and career ==
Aggarwal earned his PhD from the University of Cambridge in 1986 under the supervision of Stuart Warren. His thesis was entitled Stereocontrolled synthesis with phenylthio migration. He carried out postdoctoral work with Gilbert Stork at Columbia University, before taking up appointments first in Bath, then Sheffield and finally at the University of Bristol where he is currently a professor.

== Research ==
Aggarwal developed new methods of using chemical reactions to assemble complex, biologically important molecules. His research includes new ways of speeding up, or catalysing, these processes of synthesis. His work has applications in medicine, such as helping to provide a more effective vaccine against tuberculosis.

Although many organic molecules can occur in "right-handed" and "left-handed" forms, invariably just one of these is seen in living organisms. Normal chemical reactions, however, make both forms in equal amounts. Aggarwal's work on asymmetric synthesis made it possible to selectively synthesise more of the form important to understanding biological processes.

Aggarwal specialises in a type of molecule called ylides, which are important to the Wittig reaction – a standard tool in organic chemistry.

== Awards and honours ==
Aggarwal is the winner of multiple awards, including the Corday-Morgan and Organic Stereochemistry awards of the Royal Society of Chemistry. He was elected a Fellow of the Royal Society (FRS) in 2012. His certificate of election reads:

Aggarwal is distinguished for his outstanding contributions to the field of asymmetric synthesis, particularly applications of ylide chemistry where he is the world leader. The important new methodology he has developed has been complemented by detailed mechanistic studies which have brought about improved understanding of many fundamental reactions. His innovative approach is highlighted by the unusual but highly effective reactions of sulphur ylides with boranes, an area that has much scope for future development. His productivity and breadth make him one of the foremost organic chemists of his generation and one who is very widely recognised internationally.

- 2019: Awarded the Davy Medal of the Royal Society.
- 2025: Awarded the Royal Society of Chemistry Pedler Prize.
