= Marc Julia =

French chemist (1922–2010)

- Born: 23 October 1922; Paris, France
- Died: 29 June 2010 (aged 87)
- Known for: Julia olefination

Marc Julia (23 October 1922 – 29 June 2010) was a French chemist and the winner of the 1990 CNRS Gold Medal in chemistry. He discovered the Julia olefination reaction in 1973.

== Biography ==
Julia was born in 1922 in Paris as son of the renowned mathematician Gaston Julia. Julia studied physics at the École Normale Supérieure. After receiving his diploma he joined the group of Ian Heilbron and David G. Jones at the Imperial College London where he received his first PhD in 1948. Back to France he changed his subject to chemistry and subsequently received his second PhD for work with Georges Dupont.
