= Fries rearrangement =

Rearrangement reaction of a phenolic ester to a keto-substituted phenol

Named after	Karl Theophil Fries
Reaction type	Rearrangement reaction

Identifiers
Organic Chemistry Portal	fries-rearrangement
RSC ontology ID	RXNO:0000444

The Fries rearrangement, named for the German chemist Karl Theophil Fries, is a rearrangement reaction of a phenolic ester to a keto phenol. The reaction is induced by a Lewis acid. It involves migration of an acyl group of phenol ester to the aryl ring. The reaction is ortho and para selective and one of the two products can be favoured by changing reaction conditions, such as temperature and solvent. In some cases, the reaction is conducted with no solvent.

== Mechanism ==
The Fries rearrangement

A widely accepted mechanism involves initial formation of an acylium ion intermediate. A low reaction temperature favors para substitution and with high temperatures the ortho product prevails, this can be rationalised as exhibiting classic thermodynamic versus kinetic reaction control as the ortho product can form a more stable bidentate complex with the aluminium. Formation of the ortho product is also favoured in non-polar solvents; as the solvent polarity increases, the ratio of the para product also increases.

== Scope ==
Phenols react to form esters instead of hydroxyarylketones when reacted with acyl halides under Friedel-Crafts acylation conditions. Therefore, this reaction is of industrial importance for the synthesis of hydroxyarylketones, which are important intermediates for several pharmaceuticals. As an alternative to aluminium chloride, other Lewis acids such as boron trifluoride and bismuth triflate or strong protic acids such as hydrogen fluoride and methanesulfonic acid can also be used. In order to avoid the use of these corrosive and environmentally unfriendly catalysts altogether research into alternative heterogeneous catalysts is actively pursued.

== Limits ==
In all instances only esters can be used with stable acyl components that can withstand the harsh conditions of the Fries rearrangement. If the aromatic or the acyl component is heavily substituted then the chemical yield will drop due to steric constraints. Deactivating meta-directing groups on the benzene group will also have an adverse effect as can be expected for a Friedel–Crafts acylation.

== Photo-Fries rearrangement ==
In addition to the ordinary thermal phenyl ester reaction a photochemical variant is possible. The photo-Fries rearrangement can likewise give [1,3] and [1,5] products, which involves a radical reaction mechanism. This reaction is also possible with deactivating substituents on the aromatic group. Because the yields are low this procedure is not used in commercial production. However, photo-Fries rearrangement may occur naturally, for example when a plastic object made of aromatic polycarbonate, polyester or polyurethane, is exposed to the sun (aliphatic carbonyls undergo Norrish reactions, which are somewhat similar). In this case, photolysis of the ester groups would lead to leaching of phthalate from the plastic.

Photo Fries rearrangement

== Anionic Fries rearrangement ==
In the anionic Fries rearrangement ortho-metalation of aryl esters, carbamates and carbonates with a strong base results in a rearrangement to give ortho-carbonyl species.

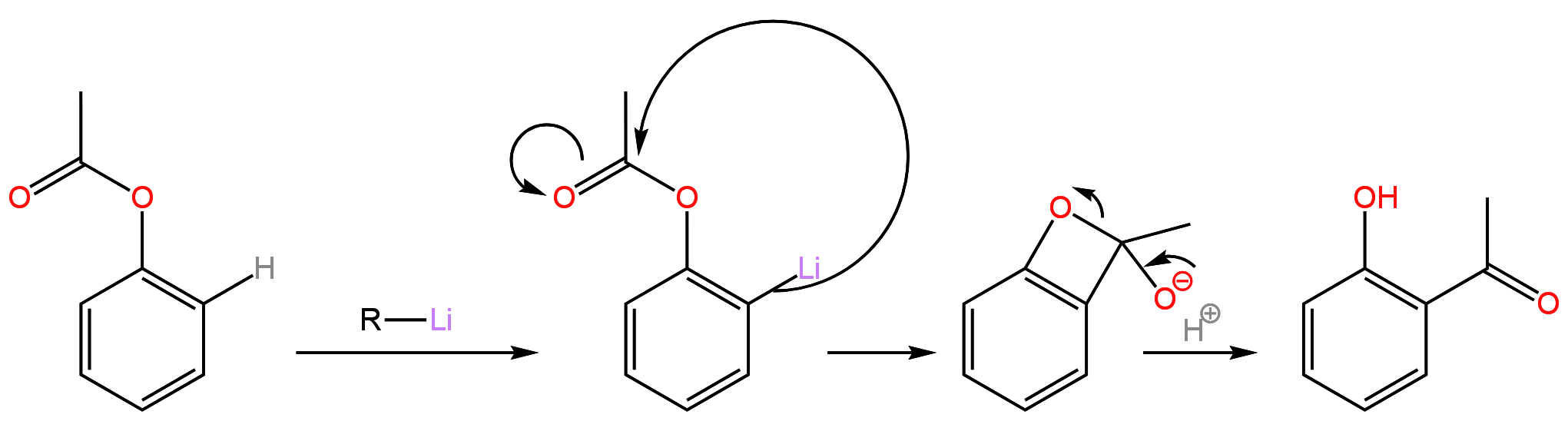
Mechanism of Anionic Fries Rearrangement

== Historic readings ==
- Fries, K.; Pfaffendorf, W. (1910). "Über ein Kondensationsprodukt des Cumaranons und seine Umwandlung in Oxindirubin". Chemische Berichte. 43 (1): 212–219. doi:10.1002/cber.19100430131.
- Blatt, A. H. (1942). "Fries Reaction". Organic Reactions. 1: 342-369.

== See also ==
- Friedel–Crafts alkylation
- Other S_{E,Ar} rearrangements:
  - Hofmann-Martius rearrangement
  - Fischer-Hepp rearrangement
  - Wallach rearrangement
- Duff reaction
