= Jonathan Clayden =

British organic chemist and professor at Bristol

Jonathan Paul Clayden
- Born: 6 February 1968 (age 58); Kampala, Uganda
- Awards: Royal Society of Chemistry's Merck Prize; Royal Society of Chemistry's Stereochemistry Prize; Royal Society of Chemistry's Corday-Morgan Medal
- Scientific career
- Institutions: University of Bristol; University of Manchester; University of Cambridge
- Thesis: The asymmetric epoxidation of allylic phosphine oxides: a stereocontrolled synthesis of allylic systems (1993)
- Doctoral advisor: Stuart Warren
- Website: www.claydenchemistry.net

Jonathan Paul Clayden FRS CChem FRSC (born 6 February 1968) is a Professor of organic chemistry at the University of Bristol.

== Education and career ==
Whilst at secondary school, he represented the UK at the International Chemistry Olympiad in 1986, winning a bronze medal. In 1992 he obtained his PhD at the University of Cambridge working with Dr Stuart Warren on asymmetric synthesis using phosphine oxide chemistry. He then carried out a postdoc with Prof Marc Julia and in 1994 became a lecturer in organic chemistry at the University of Manchester where he became a reader in 2000 and a Professor of Organic Chemistry in 2001. In 2015 he moved to a chair in chemistry at the University of Bristol. He was elected a Fellow of the Royal Society in 2025.

== Research ==
His research interests encompass various areas of synthesis and stereochemistry, particularly where conformation has a role to play: asymmetric synthesis, atropisomerism, organolithium chemistry, remote stereochemical effects and dynamic foldamer chemistry. He is one of the authors of the organic chemistry textbook - Organic Chemistry by Clayden, Greeves, Warren and Wothers. He also wrote Organolithiums: Selectivity for Synthesis, which concerns the use of organolithium compounds in organic synthetic reactions.

From 2005 to 2011 he was editor-in-chief of the Open Access Beilstein Journal of Organic Chemistry.
