= Emily Parker =

New Zealand bio-organic chemist and academic

Emily Parker FRSNZ
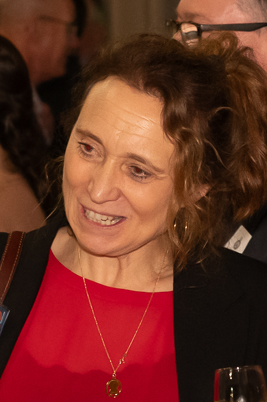
- Parker in 2024
- Other name: Emily J. Parker
- Education: University of Canterbury (BSc); University of Cambridge (PhD)
- Scientific career
- Fields: Bio-organic chemistry
- Workplaces: University of Cambridge; Massey University; University of Canterbury; Victoria University of Wellington

Emily J. Parker FRSNZ is a New Zealand bio-organic chemist and academic. She is Professor of Chemical Biology at Victoria University of Wellington.

== Academic career ==
Parker has a BSc from the University of Canterbury. She completed her PhD at the University of Cambridge in 1996 and stayed on there as a research fellow. Parker then returned to New Zealand to take up a position at Massey University. In 2006 she transferred to the University of Canterbury and remained there until June 2017 when she was appointed as full professor at the Ferrier Research Institute within the Victoria University of Wellington.

== Honours and recognition ==
Parker received the NZ Institute of Chemistry's Easterfield Award in 2005 and the New Zealand Society for Biochemistry and Molecular Biology Award for Research Excellence in 2008. In 2010, she received the Award for Sustained Excellence in Tertiary Teaching from Ako Aotearoa.

In 2018 Parker was elected a Fellow of the Royal Society of New Zealand.

== Selected works ==
- Oliver W Sterritt; Eric J M Lang; Kessans, Sarah; Timothy M Ryan; Borries Demeler; Jameson, Geoffrey Brind; Parker, Emily J. (2018). "Structural and functional characterisation of the entry point to pyocyanin biosynthesis in Pseudomonas aeruginosa defines a new 3-deoxy-d-arabino-heptulosonate 7-phosphate synthase subclass". Bioscience Reports. 38 (5). doi:10.1042/bsr20181605. PMC 6435475. PMID 30242059. Wikidata Q64970001.
- Wanting Jiao; Gerd Mittelstädt; Gert-Jan Moggré; Parker, Emily J. (2019). "Hinge Twists and Population Shifts Deliver Regulated Catalysis for ATP-PRT in Histidine Biosynthesis". Biophysical Journal. 116 (10): 1887–1897. doi:10.1016/j.bpj.2019.03.040. PMID 31053263. Wikidata Q91748354.
- Wanting Jiao; Yifei Fan; Nicola J Blackmore; Parker, Emily J. (2020). "A single amino acid substitution uncouples catalysis and allostery in an essential biosynthetic enzyme in Mycobacterium tuberculosis". Journal of Biological Chemistry. doi:10.1074/jbc.ra120.012605. PMC 7212630. PMID 32217694. Wikidata Q90689425.
- Wanting Jiao; Eric Jm Lang; Yu Bai; Yifei Fan; Parker, Emily J. (2020). "Diverse allosteric componentry and mechanisms control entry into aromatic metabolite biosynthesis". Current Opinion in Structural Biology. 65: 159–167. doi:10.1016/j.sbi.2020.06.015. PMID 32739636. Wikidata Q98187054.
