= Julia olefination =

Organic chemical reaction

Named after	Marc Julia
Reaction type	Coupling reaction

Identifiers
Organic Chemistry Portal	julia-olefination
RSC ontology ID	RXNO:0000117

The Julia olefination (also known as the Julia–Lythgoe olefination) is the chemical reaction used in organic chemistry of phenyl sulfones (1) with aldehydes (or ketones) to give alkenes (olefins)(3) after alcohol functionalization and reductive elimination using sodium amalgam or SmI_{2}. The reaction is named after the French chemist Marc Julia.

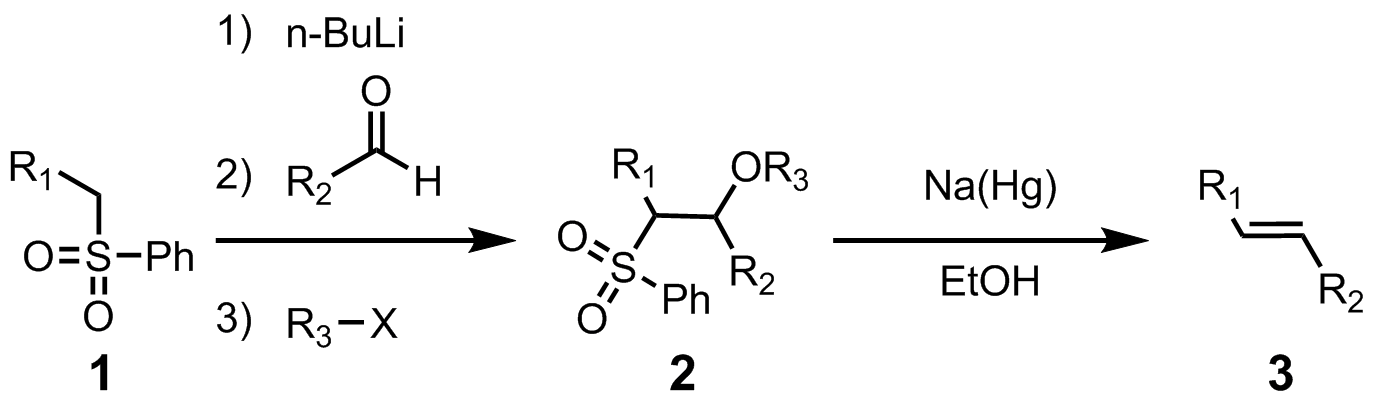
Julia Olefination Revised Scheme

The utility of this connective olefination reaction arises from its versatility, its wide functional group tolerance, and the mild reaction conditions under which the reaction proceeds.

All four steps can be carried out in a single reaction vessel, and use of R_{3}X is optional. However, purification of the sulfone intermediate 2 leads to higher yield and purity. Most often R_{3} is acetyl or benzoyl, with acetic anhydride or benzoyl chloride used in the preparation of 2.

== History ==
In 1973, Marc Julia and Jean-Marc Paris reported a novel olefin synthesis in which β-acyloxysulfones were reductively eliminated to the corresponding di-, tri-, or tetrasubstituted alkenes. Basil Lythgoe and Philip J. Kocienski explored the scope and limitation of the reaction, and today this olefination is formally known as the Julia-Lythgoe olefination. The reaction involves the addition of a sulfonyl-stabilized carbanion to a carbonyl compound, followed by elimination to form an alkene. In the initial versions of the reactions, the elimination was done under reductive conditions. More recently, a modified version that avoids this step was developed by Sylvestre Julia. The former version is sometimes referred to as the Julia-Lythgoe olefination, whereas the latter is called the Julia-Kocienski olefination. In the reductive variant, the adduct is usually acylated and then treated with a reducing agent, such as sodium amalgam or SmI_{2}. Several reviews of these reactions have been published.

== Reaction mechanism ==
The initial steps are straightforward. The phenyl sulfone anion (2) reacts with an aldehyde to form the alkoxide (3). The alkoxide is functionalized with R_{3}-X to give the stable intermediate (4). The exact mechanism of the sodium amalgam reduction is unknown but has been shown to proceed through a vinylic radical species (5). Protonation of the vinylic radical gives the desired product (6).

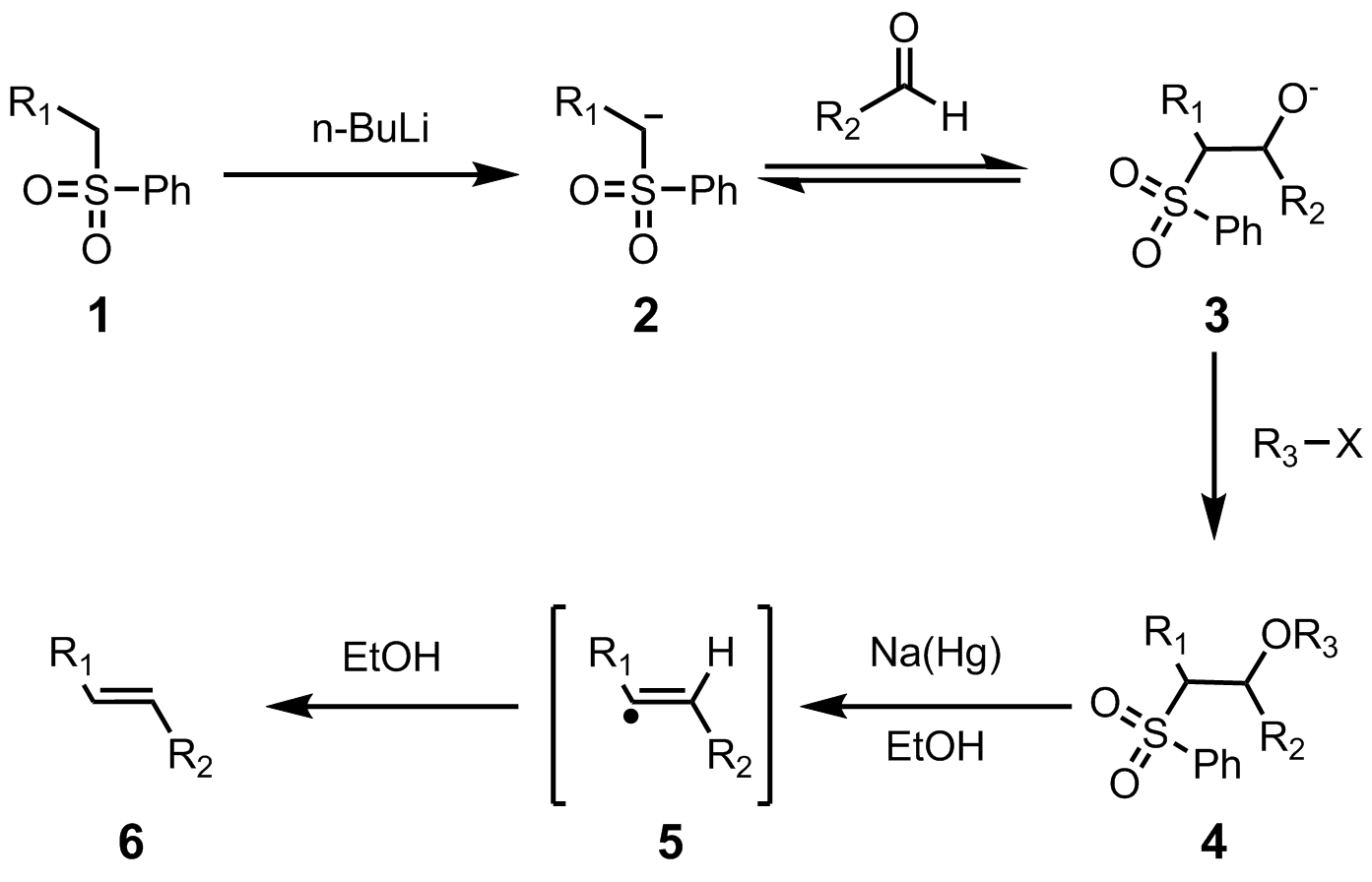
Julia olefination mechanism wiki

The stereochemistry of the alkene (6) is independent of the stereochemistry of the sulfone intermediate 4. It is thought that the radical intermediates are able to equilibrate so that the more thermodynamically stable trans-olefin is produced most often. This transformation highly favors formation of the E-alkene.

== Variations ==
=== Modified Julia olefination ===
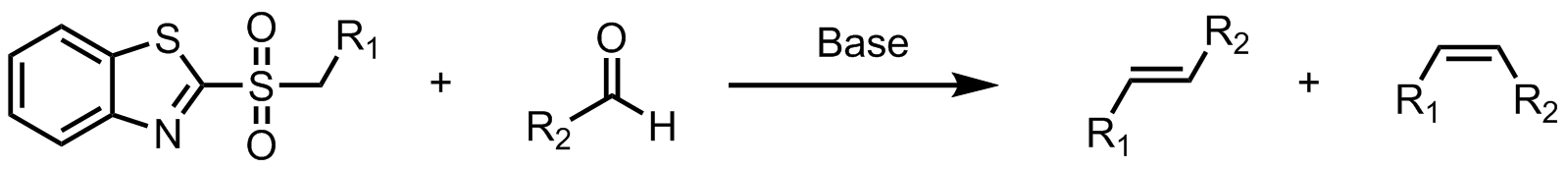
General modified julia scheme

The modified Julia olefination, also known as the one-pot Julia olefination, is a modification of the classical Julia olefination. The replacement of the phenyl sulfones with heteroaryl sulfones greatly alters the reaction pathway. The most popular example is the benzothiazole sulfone. The reaction of the benzothiazole sulfone (1) with lithium diisopropylamide (LDA) gives a metallated benzothiazolyl sulfone, which reacts quickly with aldehydes (or ketones) to give an alkoxide intermediate (2). Unlike the phenyl sulfones, this alkoxide intermediate (2) is more reactive and will undergo a Smiles rearrangement to give the sulfinate salt (4). The sulfinate salt (4) will spontaneously eliminate sulfur dioxide and lithium benzothiazolone (5) producing the desired alkene (6).

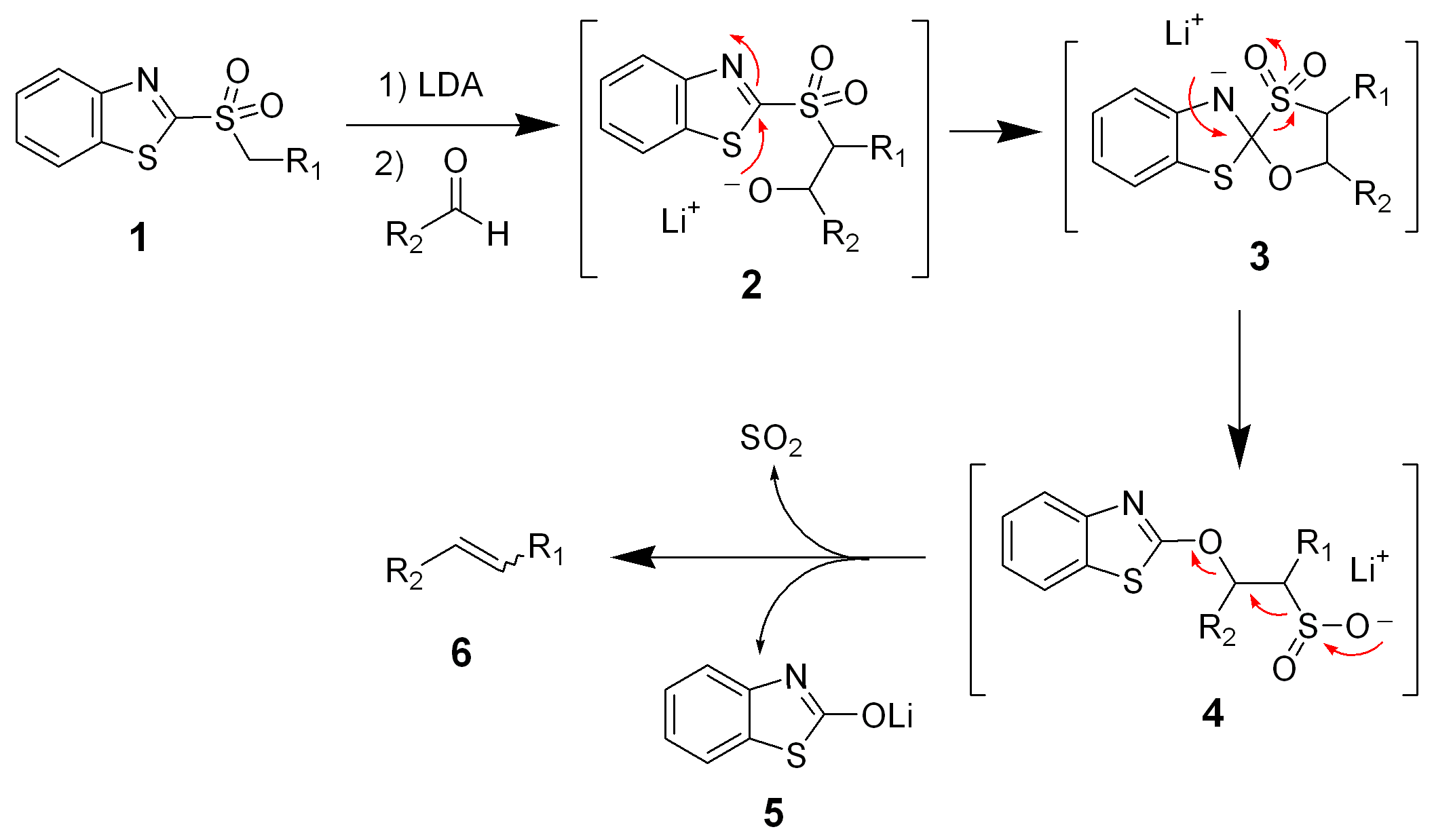
The mechanism of the benzothiazole variation of the Julia olefination

Since the benzothiazole variation of the Julia olefination does not involve equilibrating intermediates, the stereochemical outcome is a result of the stereochemistry of the initial carbonyl addition. As a result, this reaction often generates a mixture of alkene stereoisomers.

=== Julia–Kocienski olefination ===
Julia–Kocienski olefination
Named after	Sylvestre Julia; Philip Joseph Kocienski
Reaction type	Coupling reaction

Identifiers
Organic Chemistry Portal	modified-julia-kocienski-olefination
RSC ontology ID	RXNO:0000304

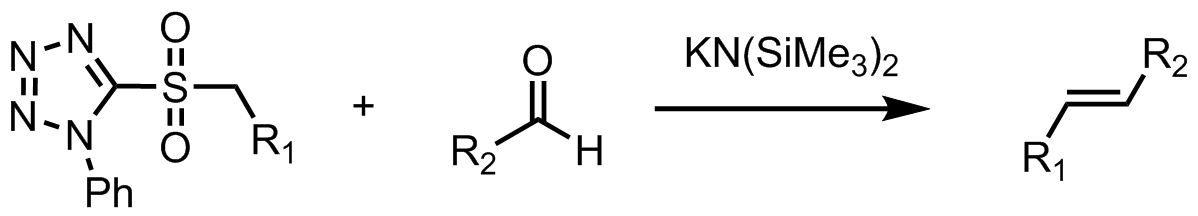
General julia kocienski scheme

The Julia–Kocienski Olefination, a further refinement of the Modified Julia olefination, offers very good E-selectivity. In the Julia–Kocienski olefination the alkylating agent is a tetrazole. It proceeds with the same mechanism as the benzothiazole sulfone above. The high E-selectivity of the Julia–Kocienski olefination is the result of kinetically controlled diastereoselective addition of metalated 1-phenyl-1H-tetrazol-5-yl (PT) sulfones to nonconjugated aldehydes. This yields anti-β-alkoxysulfones which stereospecifically decompose to the E-alkenes. In one adaptation, with t-butyltetrazoylmethyl sulfone the reaction conditions are either sodium bis(trimethylsilyl)amide at −70 °C in tetrahydrofuran or caesium carbonate at +70 °C. This reaction is named after Philip J. Kocienski for his modification to the Julia olefination.

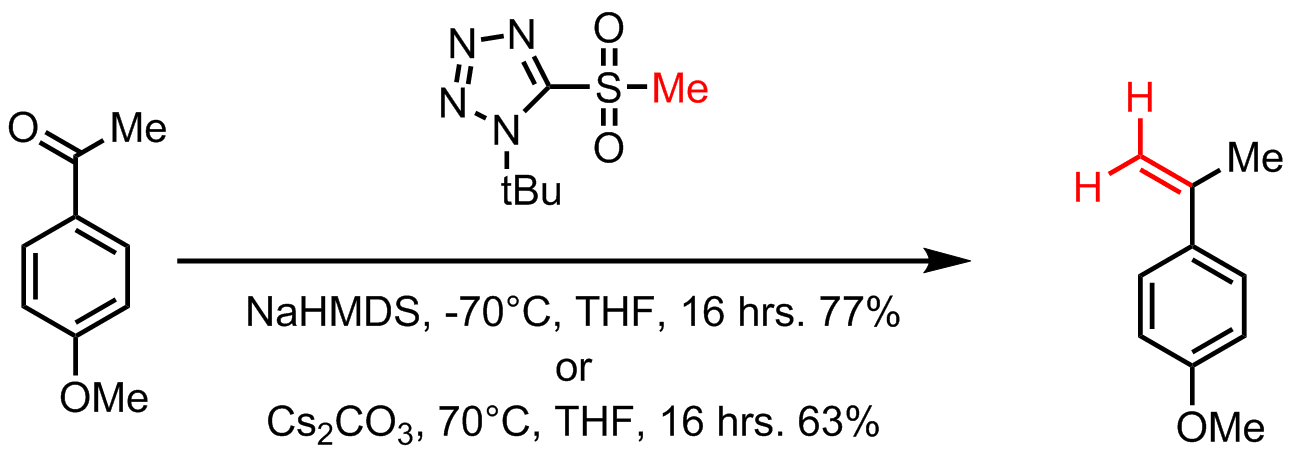
Julia-Kocienski olefination wiki

== Synthetic Applications ==
The Julia or modified Julia olefination reaction is a versatile synthetic transformation, widely utilized in the construction of complex natural products with excellent control of geometrical isomerism.

=== Pterostilbene ===
Pterostilbene is a stilbenoid chemically related to resveratrol. It belongs to the group of phytoalexins, agents produced by plants to fight infections. Pterostilbene is a naturally occurring dimethyl ether analog of resveratrol. It is believed that the compound also has anti-diabetic properties, but so far very little has been studied on this issue.

Compared to the Wittig, Wittig-Horner, Perkin, or transition-metal-catalyzed reactions to synthesize pterostilebene, the Julia olefination offers a simple, economical alternative method for preparation of pterostilbene.

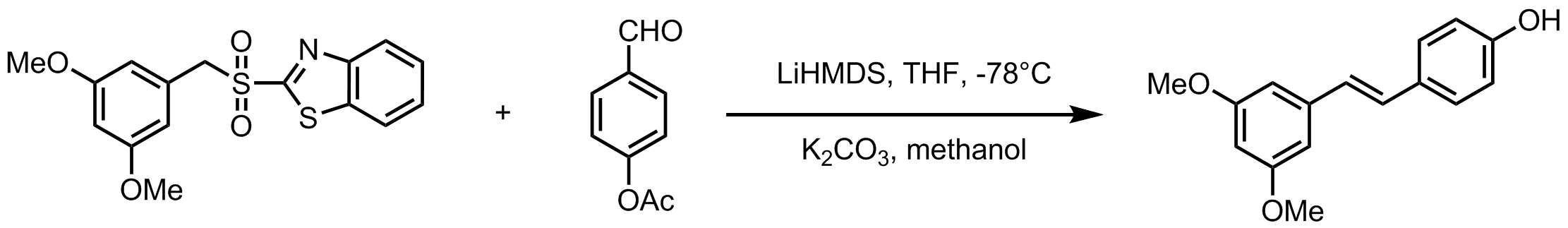
Synthesis of pterostillbene through Julia Olefination

=== Resveratrol ===
One adaptation of the Julia-Kocienski olefination gives the synthesis of the stilbenoid resveratrol, a natural compound found in common foods like grapes, wines and nuts. Resveratrol is a biologically important stilbenoid which has been suggested to have many health benefits. The Julia-Kocienski olefination serves as a powerful reaction in the synthesis of resveratrol analogues with 3,5-bis(trifluoromethyl)phenyl sulfones. The following schematic displays the general scheme for synthesizing resveratrol analogues, where R_{2} is an aryl group.

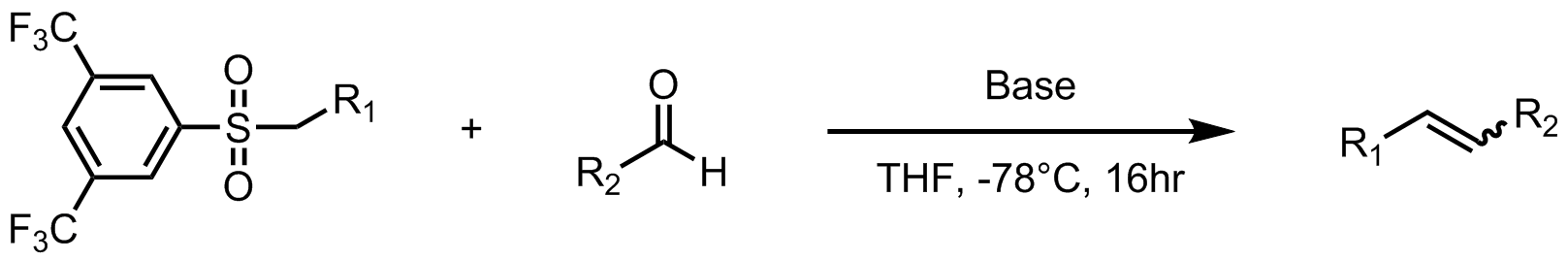
General Resveratrol Analogue Scheme

=== (−)-Callystatin A ===
In the asymmetric total synthesis of (−)-callystatin A by Amos Smith, two separate Julia olefinations were used to append two E-alkene moieties. (−)-callystatin A is a member of the leptomycin family of antibiotics. The following schematic displays the Julia-Kocienski olefination used to achieve the precursor to the natural product, as indicated by use of the PT-sulfone.

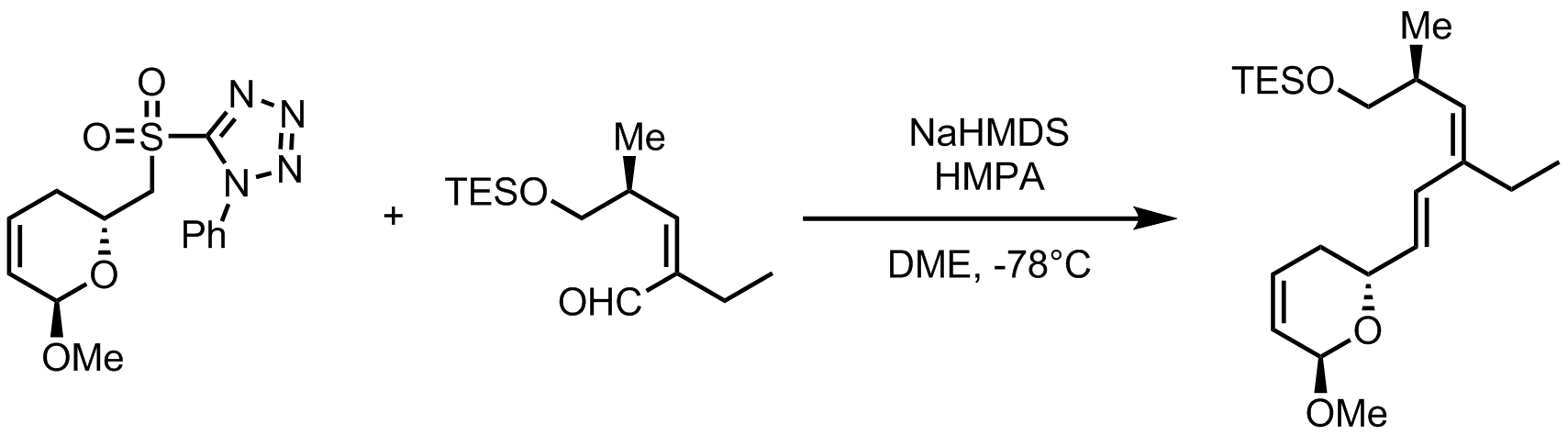
Julia olefination for callystatin A

== See also ==
- Horner–Wadsworth–Emmons reaction
- Johnson–Corey–Chaykovsky reaction
- Peterson olefination
- Wittig reaction
