= Iain Coldham =

Organic chemist and academic

- Education: University of Cambridge
- Scientific career
- Fields: Organic chemistry
- Workplaces: University of Sheffield; University of Exeter

Iain Coldham is an organic chemist and Emeritus Professor of Organic Chemistry at the University of Sheffield. He obtained his PhD from the University of Cambridge and conducted postdoctoral research in Austin, Texas (1989–1991). He was a lecturer and senior lecturer at the University of Exeter and moved to the University of Sheffield in 2003. Iain Coldham's research areas include chiral organolithium chemistry, azomethine ylide and nitrone dipolar cycloaddition reactions, and natural product synthesis.

== Academic career ==
- 1991: Lecturer in Organic Chemistry - University of Exeter
- 1998: Senior Lecturer in organic Chemistry - University of Exeter
- 2003: Reader in Organic Chemistry - University of Sheffield
- 2008: Professor of Organic Chemistry - University of Sheffield

== Research ==
- Chiral organolithium chemistry
- Azomethine ylide cycloaddition
- Natural product synthesis
