= Hofmann–Martius rearrangement =

Chemical reaction

The Hofmann–Martius rearrangement in organic chemistry is a rearrangement reaction converting an N-alkylated aniline to the corresponding ortho and / or para aryl-alkylated aniline. The reaction requires heat, and the catalyst is an acid like hydrochloric acid.

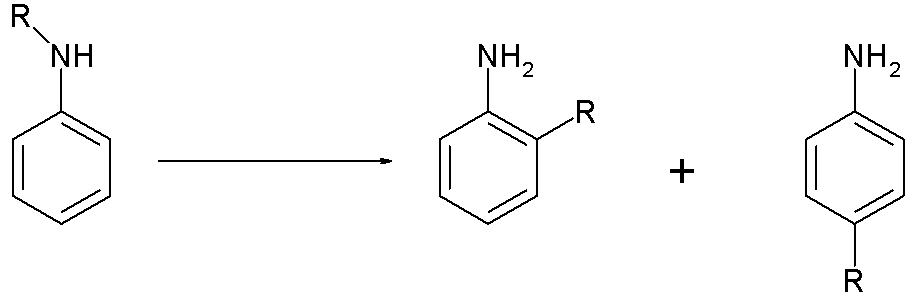

When the catalyst is a metal halide the reaction is also called the Reilly–Hickinbottom rearrangement (named after Wilfred Hickinbottom and Joseph Reilly).

The reaction is also known to work for aryl ethers and two conceptually related reactions are the Fries rearrangement and the Fischer–Hepp rearrangement. Its reaction mechanism centers around dissociation of the reactant with the positively charged organic residue R attacking the aniline ring in a Friedel–Crafts alkylation.

In one study this rearrangement was applied to a 3-N(CH_{3})(C_{6}H_{5})-2-oxindole:

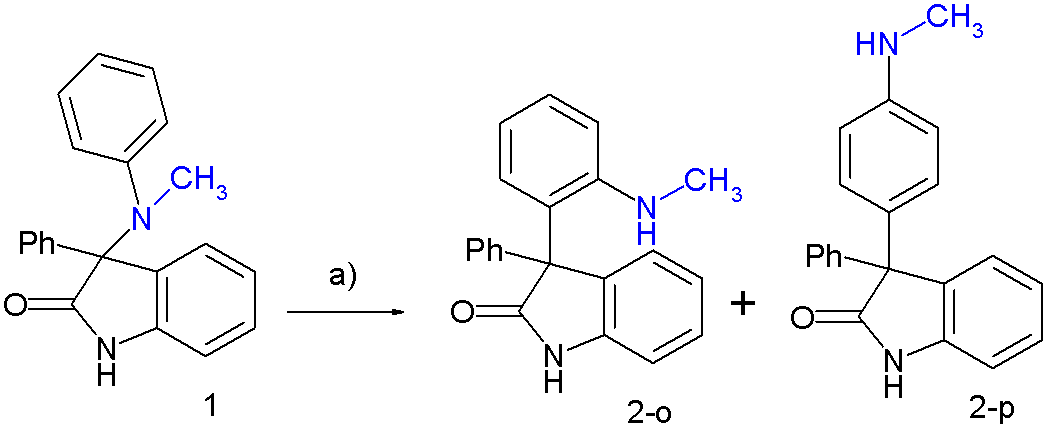

The reaction is named after German chemists August Wilhelm von Hofmann and Carl Alexander von Martius.

== See also ==
- Friedel–Crafts alkylation-like reactions:
  - Fries rearrangement
  - Fischer–Hepp rearrangement
