= Barton reaction =

The Barton reaction refers to one of several organic-chemical reactions named after Sir Derek Barton. It may be:

- the Barton nitrite ester reaction, forming a remote oxime from an alcohol
- the Barton–McCombie deoxygenation, defunctionalizing an alcohol
- the related Barton decarboxylation, converting a carboxylic acid or ester to the homologous alkane
- the Barton–Kellogg reaction, combining a diazo compound and a thioketone into an episulfide
