= Zhu Jieping =

French chemist specialized in total synthesis

Professor Jieping Zhu
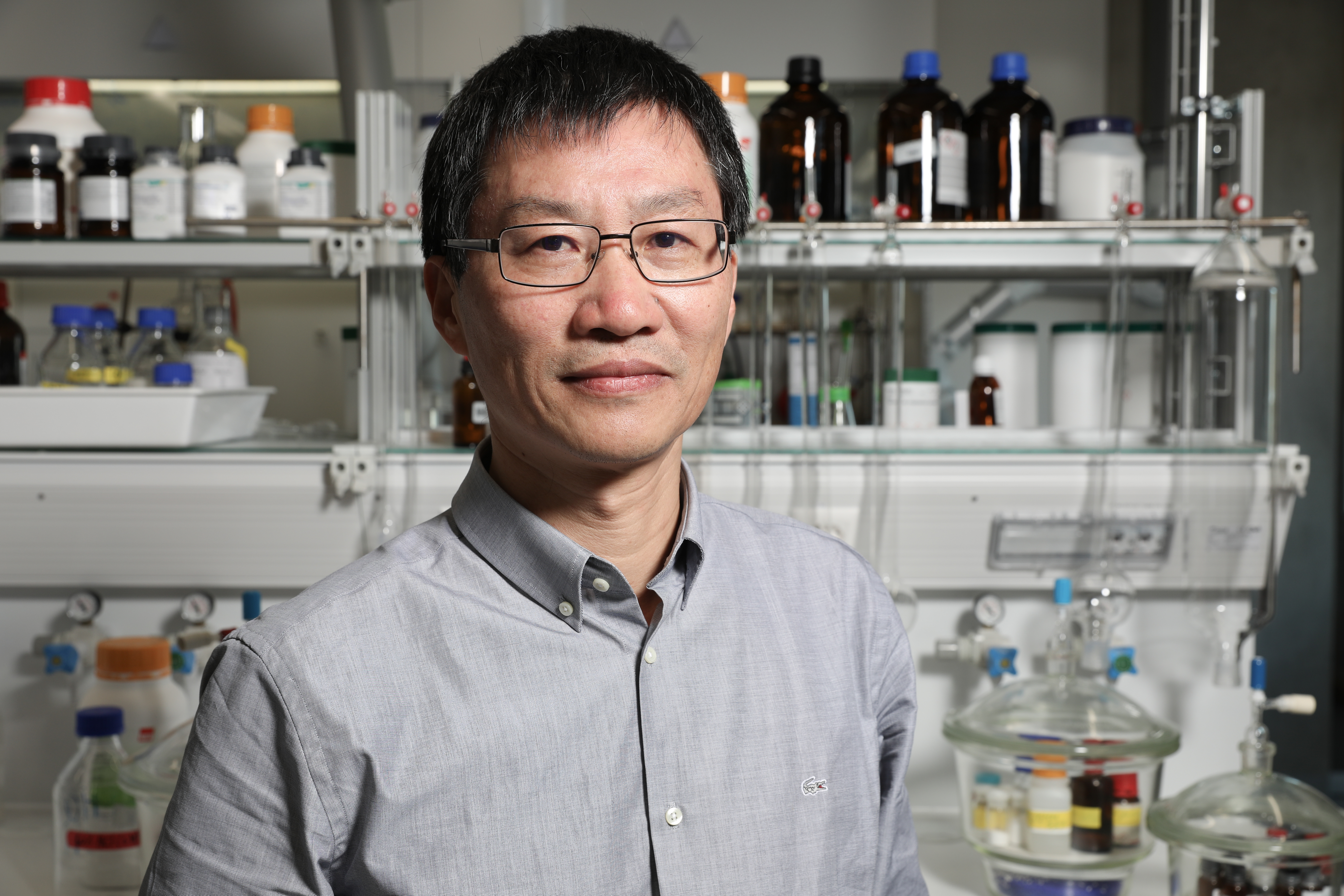
- Jieping Zhu in 2021
- Born: 1965 (age 60–61); Xiaoshan, Hangzhou, China
- Citizenship: France
- Known for: Total synthesis of complex natural products and bioactive compounds, development of novel multicomponent reactions, domino process and catalytic enantioselective transformation
- Awards: 2016 Natural Product Chemistry Award (RSC); Prix SCF-DCO; Chang Jiang Scholars; CNRS Silver Medal

Academic background
- Education: Chemistry
- Alma mater: Hangzhou Normal University; Lanzhou University; French National Centre for Scientific Research
- Thesis: Synthèse asymétrique de dérivés de l'histrionicotoxine et de spiropipéridines apparentées (Asymmetric synthesis of histrionicotoxin derivatives and related spiropiperidines) (1991)
- Doctoral advisor: Jean-Charles Quirion; Henri-Philippe Husson
- Other advisor: Derek Barton

Academic work
- Discipline: Chemistry
- Sub-discipline: Total synthesis
- Institutions: EPFL (École Polytechnique Fédérale de Lausanne)
- Main interests: Total synthesis Organometallics; Asymmetric synthesis
- Website: https://www.epfl.ch/labs/lspn/

Jieping Zhu (祝介平; born 1965 in Xiaoshan, Hangzhou, China) is an organic chemist specializing in natural product total synthesis and organometallics. He is a professor of chemistry at EPFL (École Polytechnique Fédérale de Lausanne) and the head of the Laboratory of Synthesis and Natural Products.

== Career ==
Zhu studied chemistry at Hangzhou Normal University and at Lanzhou University, both in China. He then joined Henri-Philippe Husson and Jean-Charles Quirion to pursue a PhD in organic chemistry at the Institute de Chimie des Substances Naturelles at the French National Centre for Scientific Research. In 1991, he graduated with a thesis on Synthèse asymétrique de dérivés de l'histrionicotoxine et de spiropipéridines apparentées (Asymmetric synthesis of histrionicotoxin derivatives and related spiropiperidines).

As a postdoctoral researcher he went to work with Derek Barton at the Texas A&M University and pursue research on phosphonic acid synthesis. In 1992, he joined Institut de Chimie des Substances Naturelles (ICSN) as a chargé de recherche. In 2000, he was promoted to directeur de recherche 2nd class, then 1st class in 2006 in the same institute.

Since 2010, he has been full professor of chemistry at EPFL's School of Basic Sciences of EPFL.

== Research ==
Zhu's research focuses on the development of new synthetic methods including multicomponent reactions, catalytic enantioselective transformations, and transition metal catalyzed domino processes. He is also immersed in the total synthesis of complex natural products and bioactive molecules.

== Distinctions ==
Zhu is the recipient of among others the 2016 Natural Product Chemistry Award from the Royal Society of Chemistry (RSC) Natural Product Chemistry Award, the 2010 Division of Organic Chemistry (Prix SCF-DCO) award from the Société chimique de France (French Chemical Society), the 2009 Chang Jiang Scholars (Qinghua University) awarded by the Chinese Ministry of Education, the 2009 Silver Medal of CNRS, the 2008 Novartis Chemistry Lectureship, the 2004 Liebig Lectureship of the German Chemical Society, and the 2003 Prix “Emile Jungfleisch” of French Academy of Science.

He is a fellow of the Royal Society of Chemistry. He is editor at the journal Tetrahedron Letters.

== Selected works ==
=== Books ===
- Zhu, Jieping; Bienaymé, Hugues (6 March 2006). Multicomponent Reactions. John Wiley & Sons. ISBN 9783527604241.
- Zhu, Jieping; Wang, Qian; Wang, Meixiang (15 October 2014). Multicomponent Reactions in Organic Synthesis. John Wiley & Sons. ISBN 9783527678204.

=== Papers ===
- Zhu, Jieping (2003). "Recent Developments in the Isonitrile-Based Multicomponent Synthesis of Heterocycles". European Journal of Organic Chemistry. 2003 (7): 1133–1144. doi:10.1002/ejoc.200390167.
- Janvier, Pierre; Sun, Xiaowen; Bienaymé, Hugues; Zhu, Jieping (2002). "Ammonium Chloride-Promoted Four-Component Synthesis of Pyrrolo[3,4-b]pyridin-5-one". Journal of the American Chemical Society. 124 (11): 2560–2567. Bibcode:2002JAChS.124.2560J. doi:10.1021/ja017563a. PMID 11890807.
- Chen, Jinchun; Chen, Xiaochuan; Bois-Choussy, Michèle; Zhu, Jieping (2006). "Total Synthesis of Ecteinascidin 743". Journal of the American Chemical Society. 128 (1): 87–89. Bibcode:2006JAChS.128...87C. doi:10.1021/ja0571794. PMID 16390134.
- Xu, Zhengren; Wang, Qian; Zhu, Jieping (2015). "Total Syntheses of (−)-Mersicarpine, (−)-Scholarisine G, (+)-Melodinine e, (−)-Leuconoxine, (−)-Leuconolam, (−)-Leuconodine A, (+)-Leuconodine F, and (−)-Leuconodine C: Self-Induced Diastereomeric Anisochronism (SIDA) Phenomenon for Scholarisine G and Leuconodines a and C". Journal of the American Chemical Society. 137 (20): 6712–6724. Bibcode:2015JAChS.137.6712X. doi:10.1021/jacs.5b03619. PMID 25946614.
- Andres, Rémi; Wang, Qian; Zhu, Jieping (2020). "Asymmetric Total Synthesis of (−)-Arborisidine and (−)-19-epi-Arborisidine Enabled by a Catalytic Enantioselective Pictet–Spengler Reaction". Journal of the American Chemical Society. 142 (33): 14276–14285. Bibcode:2020JAChS.14214276A. doi:10.1021/jacs.0c05804. PMID 32692169. S2CID 220672260.
- Delayre, Bastien; Piemontesi, Cyril; Wang, Qian; Zhu, Jieping (2020). "Ti Cl 3 -Mediated Synthesis of 2,3,3-Trisubstituted Indolenines: Total Synthesis of (+)-1,2-Dehydroaspidospermidine, (+)-Condyfoline, and (−)-Tubifoline". Angewandte Chemie International Edition. 59 (33): 13990–13997. doi:10.1002/anie.202005380. PMID 32415682. S2CID 218657815.
