= David Crich =

British-American organic chemist

- Born: David Crich; 21 July 1959; Chesterfield, Derbyshire, England
- Education: University of Surrey Paris-Sud University
- Scientific career
- Fields: Chemistry
- Workplaces: University College London; University of Illinois; Wayne State University; Institut de Chimie des Substances Naturelles; University of Georgia
- Doctoral advisor: Derek Barton

David Crich (born July 21, 1959) is a British American organic chemist and a professor at the University of Georgia.

He is widely known for his involvement in the development of mechanistic and synthetic organic chemistry, carbohydrate chemistry and medicinal chemistry. He has supervised over 75 doctoral students and has published over 450 peer-reviewed articles in scientific journals. The Crich beta-mannosylation reaction is named after him. He has made seminal contributions to understanding chemical glycosylation mechanisms.

== Education ==
Born in the town of Chesterfield England, Crich received a Bachelor of Science degree from the University of Surrey in 1981 before joining the group of Sir Derek Barton, Nobel Laureate, at the Institut de Chimie des Substances Naturelles (ICSN) in France. Under Barton, he learned free radical chemistry and was responsible for the development of the Barton decarboxylation reaction, for which he was awarded the degree of Docteur es Sciences by the Université de Paris XI Paris-Sud University (Orsay) in 1984. Crich stayed at the ICSN as a postdoctoral fellow with Derek Barton and Pierre Potier from 1984 to 1985.

== Career and research ==
Crich began his independent career in 1985 when he took up a lectureship in chemistry in the Christopher Ingold Laboratories at University College London (UCL) in London. After five years at UCL, Crich moved to the University of Illinois (UIC) in Chicago where he rose through the ranks to become Distinguished Professor of Organic Chemistry. It was at UIC where Crich discovered the Crich beta-mannosylation reaction. In 2007, Crich relocated to Wayne State University in Detroit as the Schaap Professor of Chemistry, before returning to the ICSN, where he was appointed the institute's director. Crich returned to Wayne State as the Schaap Professor in 2011 and stayed there until 2019 when he moved to the University of Georgia as the Georgia Research Alliance and David Chu Eminent Scholar in Drug Design.

== Awards and honors ==
- Academia des Sciences / Royal Society, Franco-British Prize (1989)
- Royal Society of Chemistry, Corday-Morgan Medal (1990)
- University of Illinois, University Scholar (1992)
- Fellow of the A. P. Sloan Foundation (1994)
- Royal Society of Chemistry, Carbohydrate Chemistry Award (1994)
- Electronic Encyclopedia of Reagents for Organic Synthesis, Executive Editor (2002–2009)
- Fellow of the Japan Society for the Promotion of Science (2006)
- Honorary Doctor of Science, University of Derby (2007)
- American Chemical Society, Wolfram Award (2008)
- Electronic Encyclopedia of Reagents for Organic Synthesis, Editor in Chief (2009–2015)
- American Chemical Society, Arthur C Cope Senior Scholar (2011)
- European Carbohydrate Society, Emil Fischer Award (2011)
- Royal Society of Chemistry, Haworth Memorial Lecturer and Medal (2014)
- American Chemical Society, C. S. Hudson Award (2017)
- International Carbohydrate Organization, Whistler Prize (2018)
- American Chemical Society, James Flack Norris Award in Physical Organic Chemistry (2024)
- National Academy of Inventors, Senior Member (2024)
