= Robert H. Crabtree =

British and American chemist (born 1948)

Robert Crabtree FRS
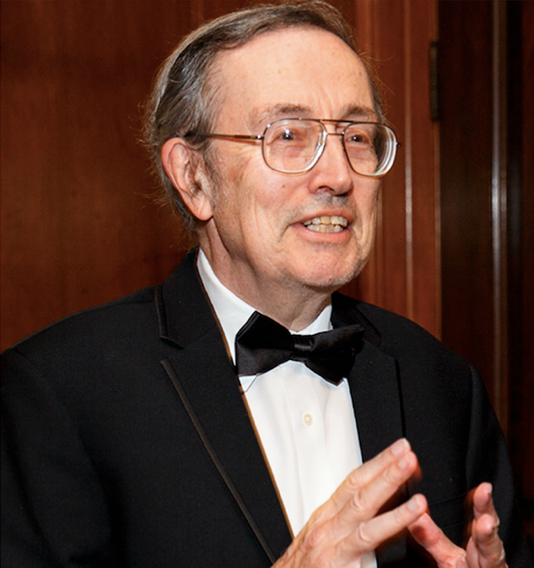
- Robert Crabtree in London, February 2019
- Born: Robert Howard Crabtree; 17 April 1948 (age 78); London, England, UK
- Education: Brighton College; University of Oxford (BA); University of Sussex (PhD)
- Known for: Crabtree's catalyst
- Awards: Corday-Morgan Prize (1982); Centenary Prize (2013)
- Scientific career
- Fields: Organometallic chemistry
- Workplaces: Yale University; Institut de Chimie des Substances Naturelles
- Thesis: Transition Metal Dinitrogen Complexes Adduct Formation and Base Character (1973)
- Doctoral advisor: Joseph Chatt
- Other academic advisors: Malcolm Green; Hugh Felkin
- Website: chem.yale.edu/people/robert-crabtree

Robert Howard Crabtree FRS (born 17 April 1948) is a British and American chemist. He is serving as Conkey P. Whitehead Professor Emeritus of Chemistry at Yale University in the United States. He is a naturalized citizen of the United States. Crabtree is particularly known for his work on "Crabtree's catalyst" for hydrogenations, and his textbook on organometallic chemistry.

== Education ==
Robert Howard Crabtree studied at Brighton College (1959–1966), and earned a Bachelor of Arts degree from the University of Oxford, where he was a student at New College, Oxford in 1970, studying under Malcolm Green. He received his PhD from the University of Sussex in 1973, supervised by Joseph Chatt.

== Career ==
After his PhD, Crabtree was a postdoctoral researcher with Hugh Felkin at the Institut de Chimie des Substances Naturelles at Gif-sur-Yvette, near Paris. He was a postdoctoral fellow (1973–1975) and then attaché de recherche (1975–1977). At the end of that time he was chargé de recherche. In 1977 Crabtree took an assistant professorship in Inorganic Chemistry at Yale University. He served as associate professor from 1982 to 1985, and as full professor from 1985 to 2021. In retirement, he now serves as an emeritus professor of chemistry.

=== Editorial positions and published works ===
- The Organometallic Chemistry of the Transition Metals (7 editions) (ISBN 978-1119465881)
- Inorganic Chemistry Section (editor) Encyclopedia of Inorganic Chemistry (1992–1994)
- Associate Editor of New Journal of Chemistry (1998–2003)
- Editor-in-chief of Comprehensive Organometallic Chemistry III (2004–present)
- Editor-in-chief of Encyclopedia of Inorganic Chemistry (2004–present)
- Board of regional editors of Science (2006–present)
- Chemistry of the Transition Metals (2009)
- Handbook of Green Chemistry – Green Catalysis (2009) (co-author)

=== Awards and honours ===
- named Fellow of the Alfred P. Sloan Foundation (1981)
- named Dreyfus Teacher-Scholar (1982)
- received the Corday-Morgan Medal from the Royal Society of Chemistry (1982)
- delivered the Esso Lectureship series (Toronto) (1986)
- named Albright and Wilson Visiting Professor at University of Warwick (1986)
- appointed to editorial board of Chemical Reviews (1990)
- received the Organometallic Chemistry Prize from American Chemical Society (1991)
- named Vice Chair of Organometallic Subdivision of ACS (1991)
- named Chair of Organometallic Subdivision of ACS (1992)
- received the Organometallic Chemistry Prize of ACS (1993)
- received the Mack Award from Ohio State University (1994)
- named H.C. Brown Lecturer at Purdue University (1996)
- named Vice Chair of Inorganic Chemistry Division of ACS (1997)
- named Chair of Inorganic Chemistry Division of ACS (1998)
- named Dow Lecturer at University of Ottawa (1999)
- received the ISI Highly Cited Author Award (2000)
- received the Bailar Medal at University of Illinois (2001)
- delivered Organometallic lecture at University of Richmond (2003)
- named Dow Lecturer at University of California, Berkeley (2004)
- delivered the Williams Lecture at University of Oxford (2004)
- delivered the Sabatier Lecture at University of Toulouse (2006)
- delivered the Brewster Lecture at Kansas State University (2006)
- received the Karcher Medal at Oklahoma State University (2007)
- delivered the Pedersen Lecture at DuPont (2008)
- named John Osborn Lecturer at University of Strasbourg (2009)
- named Mond Lecturer by the Royal Society of Chemistry (2009
- awarded Honorary Doctorate of Science by the University of Bath in September 2016
- received an ACS Green Chemistry Award (2009)
- Member National Academy of Sciences (2017)
- elected a Fellow of the Royal Society (FRS) in 2018

== Research ==
=== Hydrogenation ===
Crabtree is renowned for his influential work on hydrogenation, particularly his contributions to the development of the Crabtree catalyst. This catalyst, utilizing iridium as the active metal, displays exceptional efficiency, regio- and stereoselectivity in hydrogenation reactions. Notably, when terpinen-4-ol undergoes hydrogenation, the Crabtree catalyst exhibits a remarkable preference of 1000:1 for adding hydrogen to the substrate face containing the OH group. In contrast, the hydrogenation reaction with Palladium on carbon only achieves a selectivity ratio of 20:80. The chelation of the alcohol to the catalyst is evident from the identification of a catalyst-substrate complex involving norbornene-2-ol.

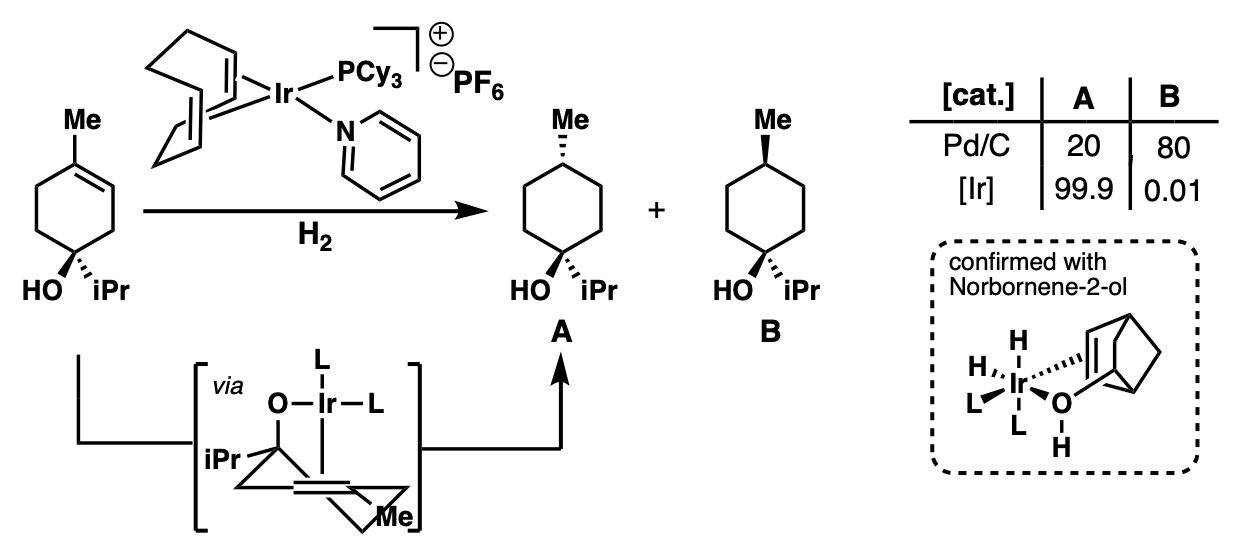
Selective Hydrogenation of terpinen-4-ol utilizing Crabtree's Catalyst.

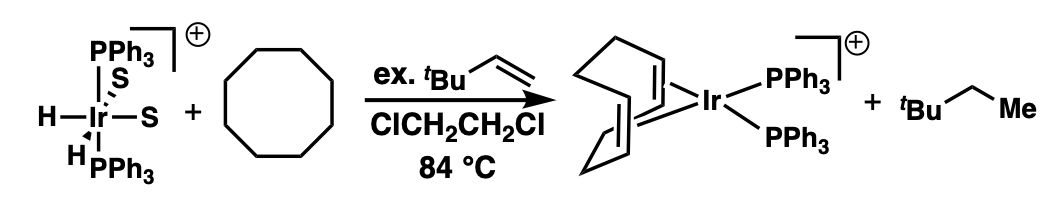
Stoichiometric alkane dehydrogenation of cyclooctane with tert-butylethylene as a hydrogen acceptor.

During his early research, Crabtree also focused on C–H bond activation. Crabtree's groundbreaking contribution in this area was reversing the hydrogenation reactions he developed before, particularly in stoichiometric alkane dehydrogenation. He utilized tert-butylethylene as a hydrogen acceptor to facilitate the release of hydrogen during the dehydrogenation of cyclooctane, forming bound cyclooctadiene. This discovery demonstrated one of the earliest instances of intermolecular C–H activation using a homogeneous metal complex. This achievement played a significant role in his tenure award and academic success

=== A novel form of Hydrogen Bonding ===
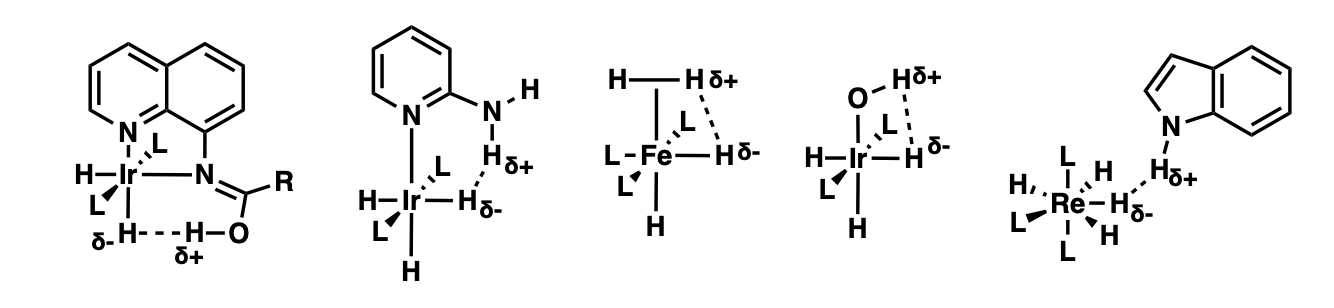
Unconventional hydrogen bonding in transition metal hydrides complexes.

Another part of Crabtree's research centers on a novel form of hydrogen bonding that involves metal hydrides, resulting in unconventional bonding interactions. Traditional hydrogen bonds feature a protic hydrogen donor and an electronegative acceptor, while Crabtree's discoveries include aromatic ring π electrons as weaker acceptors in X–H···π hydrogen bonds (X = N, O). Surprisingly, Crabtree also observed Y–H σ bonds (Y= B or metal) acting as acceptors, leading to X–H···H–Y structures with significantly shorter H···H distances compared to typical contacts. Known as "dihydrogen bonds," these interactions exhibit bond lengths of approximately 1.8 Å, in contrast to the regular H···H length of 2.4 Å. Crabtree's findings shed light on the diverse nature of hydrogen bonding, with implications for understanding molecular structures and designing catalysts with tailored properties.

=== Introduction of Mesoionic Carbenes ===
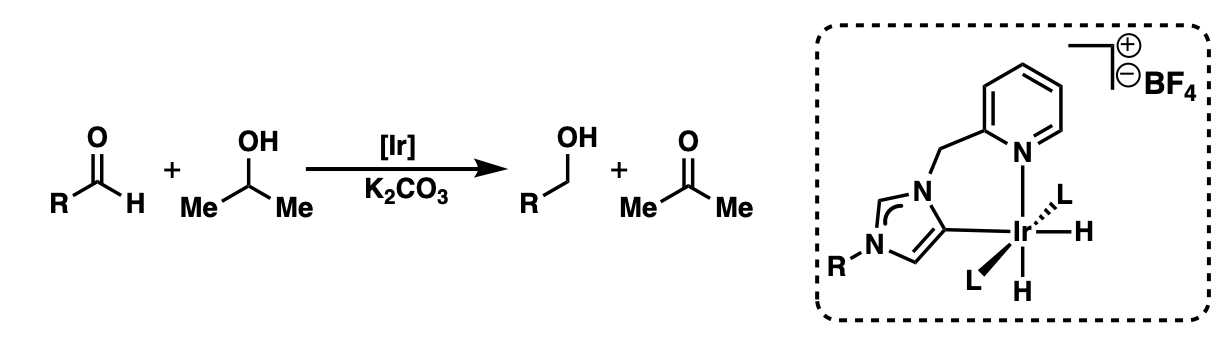
C4 coordinated imidazolylidene Iridium complex in transfer hydrogenation catalysis.

Crabtree has made significant contributions to the field of carbene chemistry, particularly in the exploration of mesoionic carbenes (MICs), or so called "abnormal carbenes". These carbenes, offer advantages as ligand systems in organometallic complexes and catalytic applications. Unlike C2 coordinated imidazolylidenes, mesoionic carbenes possess only charge-separated electronic resonance structures, allowing for greater adaptability to metal centers within catalytic cycles. Crabtree has developed novel methods for generating and isolating abnormal carbenes, providing insights into their structures and stability under different conditions. Notably, he introduced the first example of an abnormal carbene complex incorporating an iridium complex with a C4 coordinated imidazolylidene, which found application in transfer hydrogenation catalysis.

=== Manganese di-μ-oxo Dimers for Oxygen Evolution ===
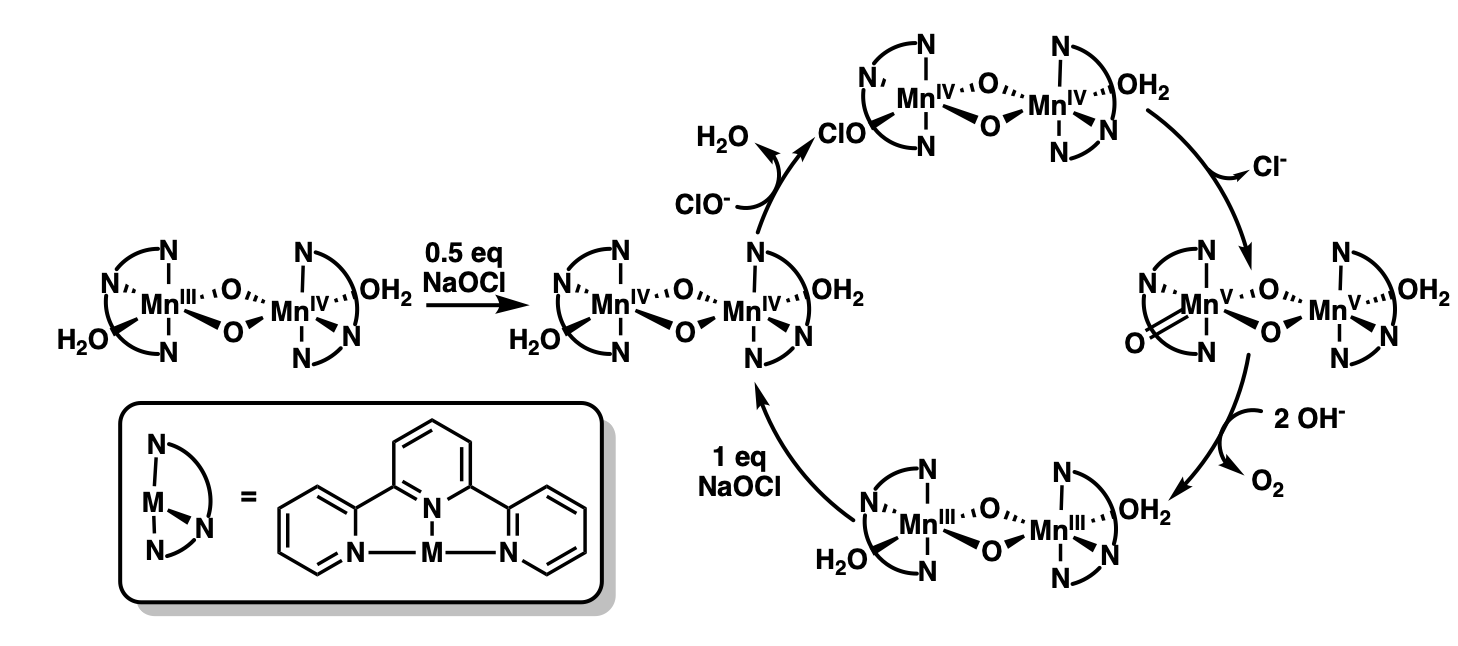
Manganese di-μ-oxo dimers involved in O2-evolution as a functional model for photosynthetic water oxidation.

Crabtree's research has made significant advancements in our understanding of O–O bond formation within manganese di-μ-oxo dimers involved in oxygen evolution. Through his investigations, he has put forward a simplified proposal for the reaction mechanism responsible for the generation of oxygen through the reaction of a manganese di-μ-oxo dimer with NaClO. The oxidation of the IV/IV dimer results in the production of a Mn(V)=O dimer. Subsequently, the formation of the O–O bond could potentially occur through a nucleophilic attack of OH– on the oxo group. Oxygen-18 isotope labeling experiments have demonstrated that the oxygen atoms in the evolved molecular oxygen originate from water. This system thus serves as a functional model for photosynthetic water oxidation.

Crabtree has made significant contributions in C–H bond activation, water oxidation, and hydrogenation. His approach entails selecting unique projects, conducting early critical experiments, transitioning between problems, developing air-stable catalysts, and educating through his writing.
