= Samir Zard =

Lebanese-French chemist

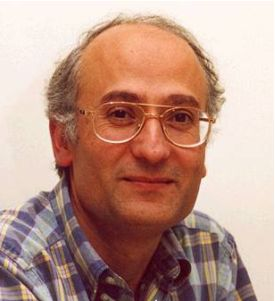
- Born: 1955 (age 70–71); Ife, Nigeria
- Education: American University of Beirut; Imperial College; Université Paris-Sud
- Known for: Barton–Zard synthesis
- Awards: CNRS Silver Medal (2007); Légion d'honneur (2007); Grand Prix Achille Le Bel (2012)
- Scientific career
- Fields: Organic chemistry

Samir Zard (born 1955) is a Lebanese-French chemist and the president of the department of chemistry at the École polytechnique, Paris, where he also directs the department of organic chemistry and synthesis.

== Biography ==
Samir Zard was born in Ife, Nigeria; he grew up in the suburbs of Lebanon. Zard initially studied chemistry at the American University of Beirut, but in 1975 he was forced to emigrate due to the Lebanese civil war. He completed his undergraduate education at Imperial College London, receiving the highest mark among his graduating class, and followed Sir Derek Barton to Université Paris-Sud for doctoral study. He defended his thesis in 1983 and subsequently started his research career at the Institut de Chimie des Substances Naturelles at Gif-sur-Yvette, at the time also directed by Barton.

In 1986, he rejoined the organic chemistry department of the École polytechnique, where he has since worked.

== Work ==
Zard and his group have made significant advances in the chemistry of natural products, including the extraction of the alkaloids Dendrobine and γ-lycorane.

In 1990 he assisted Barton in developing the Barton–Zard synthesis, a useful route to pyrrole derivatives:

An expert in radical chemistry, Zard and his group have notably worked on the xanthates, and contributed to the development of the reversible addition−fragmentation chain-transfer polymerization method.

He currently serves on the editorial board of Tetrahedron Letters.

== Awards and distinctions ==
- Birch Lecturer (2015)
- Liversidge Lecturer (2015)
- 1st Barton Lecturer in Creativity in Organic Synthesis (2012)
- Grand Prix Achille Le Bel (2012)
- Grignard-Wittig Award of the German Chemical Society (2008)
- Innovation Award - École polytechnique (2008)
- Légion d'honneur (2007)
- President, Bürgenstock Conference (2007)
- CNRS Silver Medal (2007)
- Dargelos prize (2006)
- Prix Rhodia (2000)
- Clavel-Lespiau prize of the French Academy of Sciences (1995)
- Prize of the Société chimique de France (1992)
