= Crich (disambiguation) =

Crich is a village in Derbyshire, England.

Crich may also refer to:

== Places ==
- Crich-El-Oued, village in Tunisia
- Crich Stand, a war memorial tower in Crich, Derbyshire
- Crich Tramway Village, trading name of National Tramway Museum at Crich, Derbyshire

== People ==
- Crichy Crich, musician featuring on 2018 single by Orgy
- David Crich, chemist after whom Crich beta-mannosylation is named
- Gerard Crich (fictional), character in D H Lawrence's Women in Love

== Science ==
- Crich beta-mannosylation, a synthetic strategy in organic chemistry
