= Crabtree's catalyst =

- Crabtree's catalyst

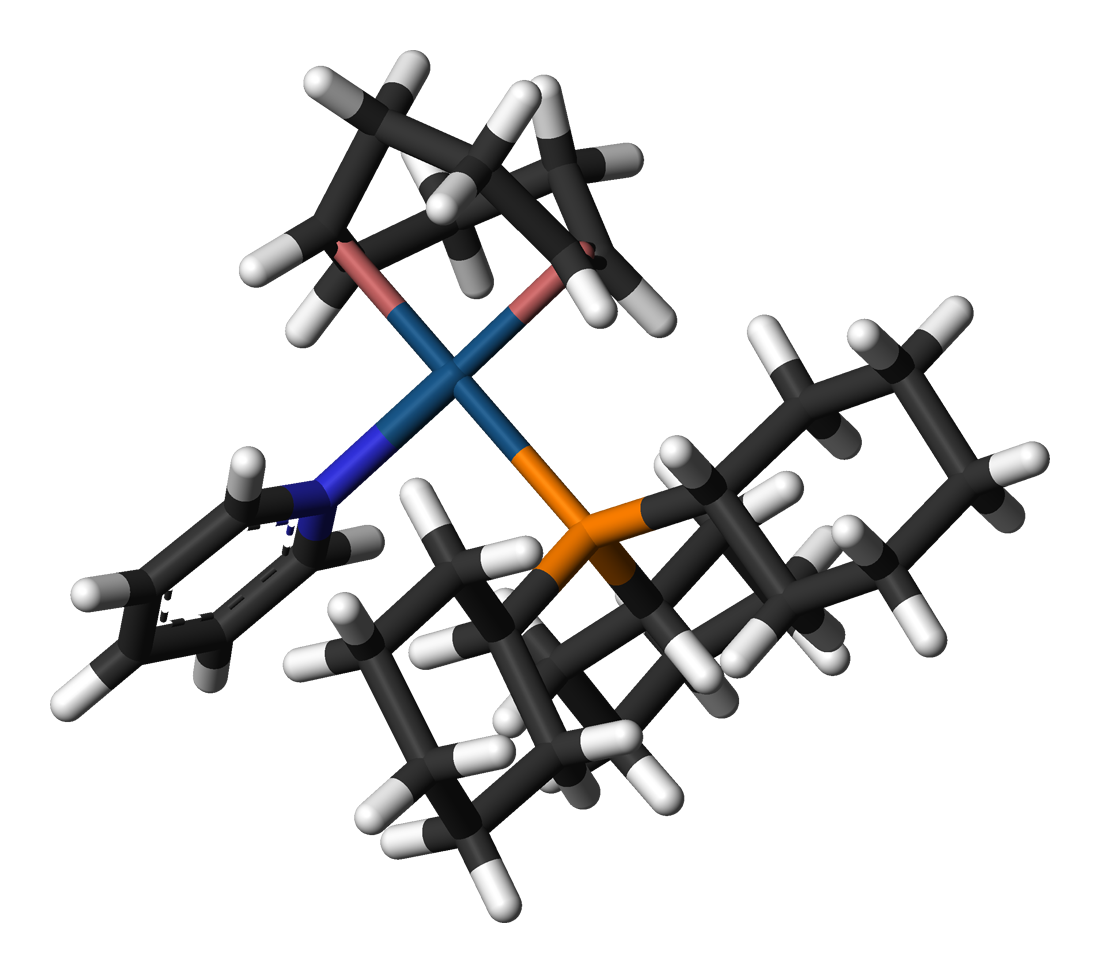

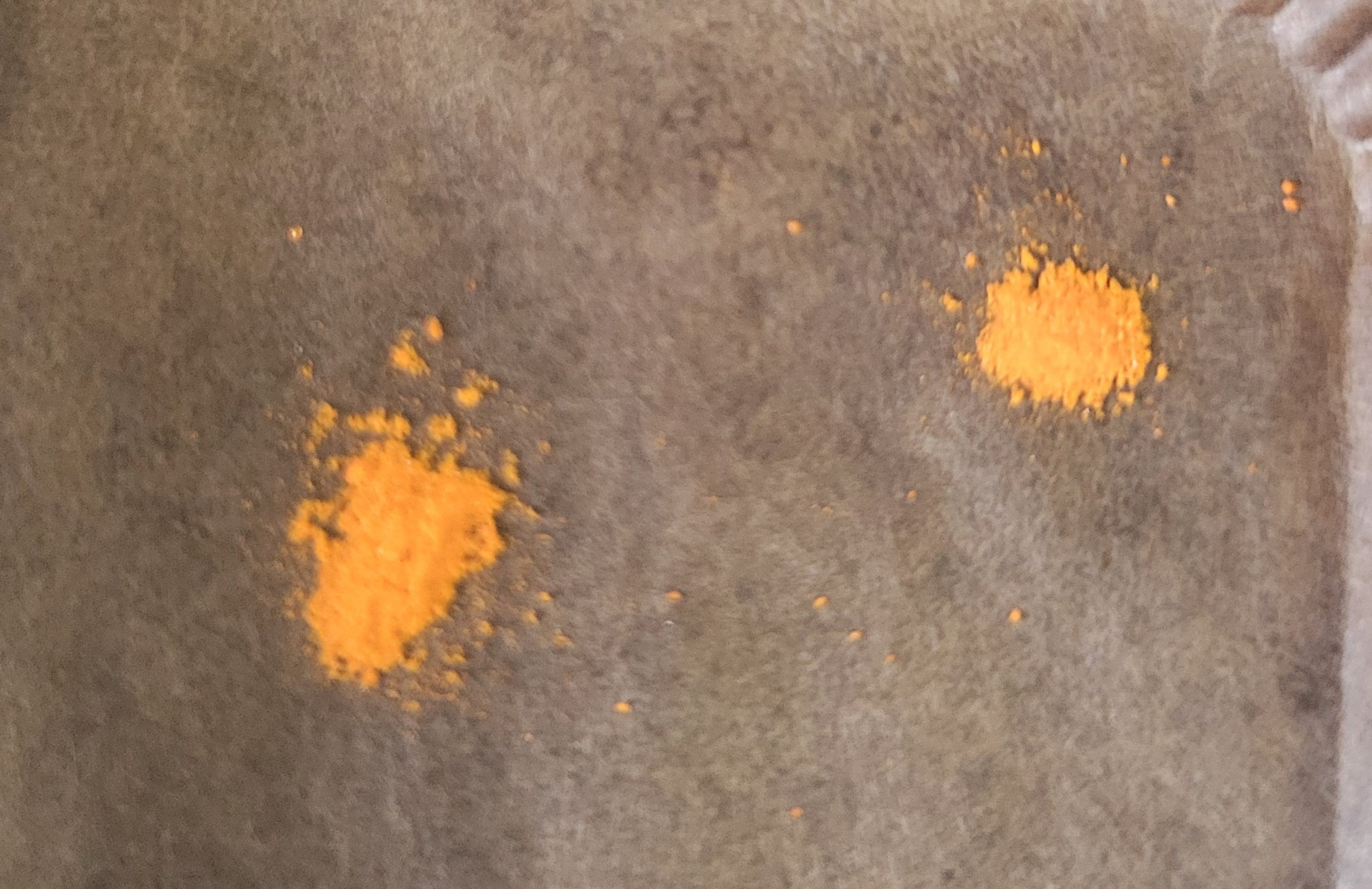

Names
- IUPAC name (SP-4)-(η^{2},η^{2}-Cycloocta-1,5-diene)(pyridine)(tricyclohexylphosphane)iridium(1+) hexafluoridophosphate(1−)

Identifiers
| CAS Number | 64536-78-3 |
| 3D model (JSmol) | Interactive image |
| ChemSpider | 21170841 |
| ECHA InfoCard | 100.164.161 |
| PubChem CID | 5702647 |
| UNII | 816RS2NBPN |
| CompTox Dashboard (EPA) | DTXSID10370362 |
- InChI: InChI=1S/C18H33P.C8H12.C5H5N.F6P.Ir/c1-4-10-16(11-5-1)19(17-12-6-2-7-13-17)18-14-8-3-9-15-18;1-2-4-6-8-7-5-3-1;1-2-4-6-5-3-1;1-7(2,3,4,5)6;/h16-18H,1-15H2;1-2,7-8H,3-6H2;1-5H;;/q;;;-1;+1/b;2-1-,8-7-;;; Key: UJXHUUQZACSUOG-KJWGIZLLSA-N; InChI=1/C18H33P.C8H12.C5H5N.F6P.Ir/c1-4-10-16(11-5-1)19(17-12-6-2-7-13-17)18-14-8-3-9-15-18;1-2-4-6-8-7-5-3-1;1-2-4-6-5-3-1;1-7(2,3,4,5)6;/h16-18H,1-15H2;1-2,7-8H,3-6H2;1-5H;;/q;;;-1;+1/b;2-1-,8-7-;;; Key: UJXHUUQZACSUOG-KJWGIZLLBW
- SMILES: c1ccncc1.C1CCC(CC1)P(C2CCCCC2)C3CCCCC3.C1/C=C\CC/C=C\C1.F[P-](F)(F)(F)(F)F.[Ir+]

Properties
| Chemical formula | C_{31}H_{50}F_{6}IrNP_{2} |
| Molar mass | 804.9026 g/mol |
| Appearance | Yellow microcrystals |
| Melting point | 150 °C (302 °F; 423 K) (decomposes) |
- Except where otherwise noted, data are given for materials in their standard state (at 25 °C [77 °F], 100 kPa). verify (what is ?) Infobox references

Crabtree's catalyst is an organoiridium compound with the formula [(C_{8}H_{12})Ir{P(C_{6}H_{11})_{3}}(C_{5}H_{5}N)]PF_{6}. It is a homogeneous catalyst for hydrogenation and hydrogen-transfer reactions, developed by Robert H. Crabtree. This air stable orange solid is commercially available and known for its directed hydrogenation to give trans stereoselectivity with respective of directing group.

== Structure and synthesis ==
The cation has a square planar molecular geometry, as expected for a d^{8} complex. It is prepared from cyclooctadiene iridium chloride dimer.

== Reactivity ==
Crabtree’s catalyst is effective for the hydrogenations of mono-, di-, tri-, and tetra-substituted substrates. Whereas Wilkinson’s catalyst and the Schrock–Osborn catalyst do not catalyze the hydrogenation of a tetrasubstituted olefin, Crabtree’s catalyst does so to at high turnover frequencies (table).

Turnover frequencies
| Substrate | Wilkinson's catalyst | Schrock–Osborn catalyst | Crabtree's catalyst |
|---|---|---|---|
| Hex-1-ene | 650 | 4000 | 6400 |
| Cyclohexene | 700 | 10 | 4500 |
| 1-Methylcyclohexene | 13 | — | 3800 |
| 2,3-Dimethylbut-2-ene | — | — | 4000 |

The catalyst is reactive at room temperature. The reaction is robust without drying solvents or meticulous deoxygenation of the hydrogen. The catalyst is tolerant of weakly basic functional groups such as ester, but not alcohols (see below) or amines. The catalyst is sensitive to proton-bearing impurities.

The catalyst becomes irreversibly deactivated after about ten minutes at room temperature, signaled by appearance of yellow color. One deactivation process involves formation of hydride-bridged dimers. As a consequence, Crabtree's Catalyst is usually used in very low catalyst loading.

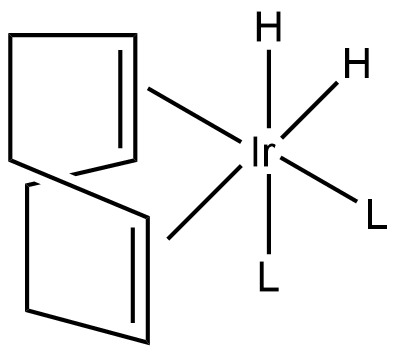
Crabtree's catalyst is thought to operate via an intermediate such as this: cis-[IrH_{2}(cod)L_{2}] (cationic charge not shown).

=== Other catalytic functions: isotope exchange and isomerization ===
Besides hydrogenation, the catalyst catalyzes the isomerization and hydroboration of alkenes.

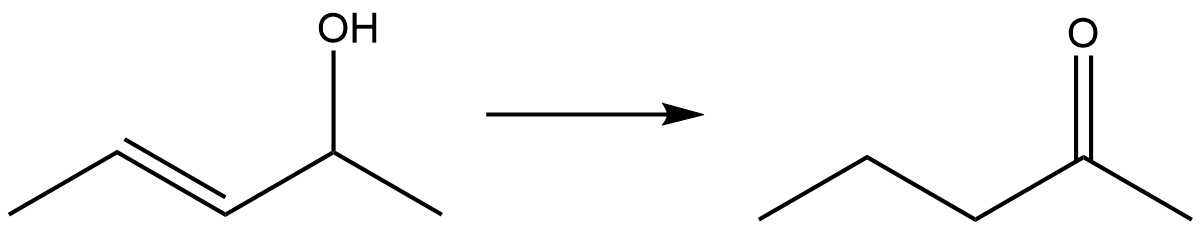
An example of isomerization with Crabtree's catalyst. The reaction proceeds 98% to completion in 30 minutes at room temperature.

Crabtree's catalyst is used in isotope exchange reactions. More specifically, it catalyzes the direct exchange of a hydrogen atom with its isotopes deuterium and tritium, without the use of an intermediate. It has been shown that isotope exchange with Crabtree’s catalyst is highly regioselective.

=== Influence of directing functional groups ===
The hydrogenation of a terpen-4-ol demonstrates the ability of compounds with directing groups (the –OH group) to undergo diastereoselective hydrogenation. With palladium on carbon in ethanol the product distribution is 20:80 favoring the cis isomer (2B in Scheme 1). The spatial arrangement of the cyclohexene ring creates a polar face and a non-polar face. During the reaction, one face must orient toward the surface of the catalyst while the other faces the solvent. In ethanol, the polar face preferentially interacts with the solvent via hydrogen bonding, resulting in selective hydrogenation from the non-polar face. In cyclohexane, this effect is removed; however, a slight preference for hydrogenation from the polar face due to the haptophilicty of the hydroxyl group results in a ratio 53:47 favoring the trans isomer. Haptophilicity is a property which promotes a functional group to donate electron density to the metal center of catalyst, directing the reaction. The distribution changes completely in favor of the trans isomer 2A when Crabtree's catalyst is used in dichloromethane as haptophilic effects dominate. This selectivity is both predictable and practically useful. Carbonyl groups (and other Lewis-basic groups) are also known to direct the hydrogenation by the Crabtree catalyst to be highly regioselective.

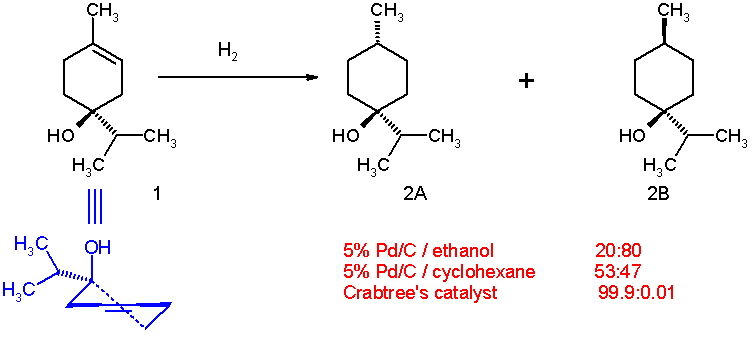

The directing effect that causes the stereoselectivity of hydrogenation of terpen-4-ol with Crabtree’s catalyst is shown below.

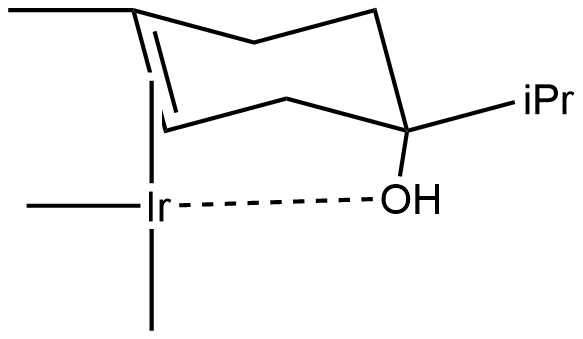
Directing effect of an –OH group on diastereoselectivity of hydrogenation by Crabtree's catalyst. Hydrogen is added from the direction of the iridium atom, selecting for the reactivity shown above. Additional ligands on catalyst not shown.

== History ==
Crabtree and graduate student George Morris discovered this catalyst in the 1970s while working on iridium analogues of Wilkinson's rhodium-based catalyst at the Institut de Chimie des Substances Naturelles at Gif-sur-Yvette, near Paris.

Previous hydrogenation catalysts included Wilkinson’s catalyst and a cationic rhodium(I) complex with two phosphine groups developed by Osborn and Schrock. These catalysts accomplished hydrogenation through displacement; after hydrogen addition across the metal, a solvent or a phosphine group dissociated from the rhodium metal so the olefin to be hydrogenated could gain access to the active site. This displacement occurs quickly for rhodium complexes but occurs barely at all for iridium complexes. Because of this, research at the time focused on rhodium compounds instead of compounds involving transition metals of the third row, like iridium. Wilkinson, Osborn, and Schrock also only used coordinating solvents.

Crabtree noted that the ligand dissociation step does not occur in heterogeneous catalysis, and so posited that this step was limiting in homogeneous systems. They sought catalysts with "irreversibly created active sites in a noncoordinating solvent." This led to the development of the Crabtree catalyst, and use of the solvent CH_{2}Cl_{2}.
