= Michael Mingos =

British chemist and academic

- Born: David Michael Patrick Mingos; 6 August 1944 (age 81); Basra, Hashemite Kingdom of Iraq
- Education: University of Sussex (PhD)
- Known for: Green–Davies–Mingos rules Wade–Mingos rules
- Awards: FRS (1992); Tilden Prize (1989); Corday–Morgan Prize (1978)
- Scientific career
- Fields: Cluster chemistry
- Thesis: The preparation and properties of some tertiary phosphine complexes of osmium, iridium, ruthenium, and platinum (1968)
- Website: seh.ox.ac.uk/users/michaelmingos

David Michael Patrick Mingos (born 6 August 1944) is a British chemist and academic. He was Principal of St Edmund Hall, Oxford from 1999 to 2009, and Professor of Inorganic Chemistry at the University of Oxford.

== Education ==
Mingos attended the Harvey Grammar School, King Edward VII School Lytham St Anne's, University of Manchester Institute of Science and Technology (Chemistry Department Prize 1963, BSc First Class 1965, Hon DSc 2000), and the University of Sussex (DPhil 1968, and Hon DSc 2001).

== Career ==
Mingos undertook postdoctoral research at Northwestern University (Fulbright Fellow 1968–70) and at the University of Sussex (ICI Fellow 1970–71). From 1971 until 1976 he was a Lecturer at Queen Mary, University of London. He then moved to the University of Oxford as Fellow and Tutor at Keble College and University Lecturer. From 1977 until 1992 he was also Lecturer at Pembroke College, Oxford.

In 1978, Mingos, Stephen G. Davies and Malcolm Green compiled a set of rules that summarise where nucleophilic additions will occur on pi ligands.

Mingos' 1984 paper on the polyhedral skeletal electron pair theory develops Wade's electron counting rules for predicting the molecular geometry of cluster compounds.

In 1990 he was appointed Reader in Inorganic Chemistry and for the academic year 1991/92 he served as Assessor. From 1992 until 1999 he worked at Imperial College London as Sir Edward Frankland BP Professor of Inorganic Chemistry (1992–99) and Dean of the Royal College of Science (1996–99).

In 1999 Mingos was appointed Principal of St Edmund Hall, Oxford and at the same time he became a visiting professor at Imperial College London. In 2000 he received as a Title of Distinction the title of professor of inorganic chemistry at the University of Oxford. He was superseded as principal by Professor Keith Gull on 1 October 2009.

With David J. Wales he is the co-author of the textbook Introduction to Cluster Chemistry.

== Honours and awards ==
In 1980, Mingos was award the Corday-Morgan Medal and Prize of the Royal Society of Chemistry. He was elected a Fellow of the Royal Society (FRS) in 1992.

== Personal life ==
Michael Mingos is the son of Vasso Mingos, of Athens, and Rose Enid Billie Mingos née Griffiths.
