= Pierre Potier =

French chemist and pharmacist

Pierre Potier (22 August 1934 – 3 February 2006) was a French pharmacist as well as a chemist. He held the position of Director of the Institut de Chimie des Substances Naturelles (1974 to 2000), as well as a teaching position at the Muséum national d'histoire naturelle. He was a member of the Académie nationale de pharmacie, the Académie des sciences, the Académie des technologies and the Academia Europaea.

== Biography ==
Potier attended the Faculté de pharmacie de Paris, and then the Institut de Chimie des Substances Naturelles (ICSN) in Gif-sur-Yvette. While working at this institution he collaborated with Edgar Lederer, Derek Barton and Guy Ourisson. In 1968, he lost his wife to breast cancer. This pushed him to work on cancer. For two years from July 1994, he was the director general of research and technology at the ministère français de l'Enseignement supérieur et de la Recherche. In 1998, he received the CNRS gold medal. He was president of the Fondation de la maison de la chimie. Potier was an officer of the Légion d'honneur.

== Works ==
His research was orientated towards understanding and imitating natural synthesis occurring in plants so as to produce the active compounds in drugs. In the course of his work he perfected the tubuline test, a simple biological test permitting the rapid detection of anti-tumoral drugs.

Amongst his discoveries are vinorelbine (from the Catharanthus roseus) and docetaxel (from Taxus baccata). Docetaxel commercialised under the name Taxotere has become one of the most prescribed anti-cancer drugs in the world and was the number one source of revenue for the CNRS from patents, until the expiry of its patent. All his life he wanted to prove that public research could and should co-operate with the private sector. Potier was convinced that mutual profit could result from this co-operation.

== Legacy ==
The Prix Pierre Potier was created in his honour in 2006 by the Ministry of the Economy and Finance, to encourage innovation in chemical entreprises in favour of durable development. The prize is administered by the Maison de la chimie and France Chimie.

== Bibliography ==
- Muriel Le Roux, "Hommage à Pierre Potier, dépasser les limites du présent", Rayonnement du CNRS, no. 41, summer 2006, p. 5-27 (in French)
