= C9H21N3 =

The molecular formula C_{9}H_{21}N_{3} (molar mass: 171.28 g/mol, exact mass: 171.1735 u) may refer to:

- 2-tert-Butyl-1,1,3,3-tetramethylguanidine
- 1,4,7-Trimethyl-1,4,7-triazacyclononane
