= Gerard Parkin =

- Education: The Queen's College, Oxford
- Awards: Presidential Award for Excellence in Science, Mathematics and Engineering Mentoring (2009); ACS Award in Organometallic Chemistry (2008); Corday–Morgan Medal (1995); ACS Award in pure chemistry (1994)
- Scientific career
- Fields: Chemistry (main group and transition metal)
- Workplaces: Columbia University
- Doctoral advisor: Malcolm Green
- Website: www.columbia.edu/.../parkin/

Gerard "Ged" F. R. Parkin (born February 15, 1959) is a professor of chemistry at Columbia University.

== Biography ==
Gerard Parkin attended the English Martyrs School and Sixth Form College before working under Malcolm Green during both his undergraduate and graduate studies at The Queen's College, Oxford. His work involved exploring the chemistry of tungsten phosphine derivatives. He obtained a post-doctoral position at the California Institute of Technology working with Professor John Bercaw on tungstenocene reactivity. In 1988, Ged joined the faculty at Columbia University, where he currently investigates a myriad of problems in main group and transition metal chemistry, including:

- Calixarene complexes
- Retrodative (i.e., metal-to-ligand) bonding, especially related to boratranes
- Group 6 reactivity relating to X-H (X=H, C, O) bond activation, hydrodesulfurization and hydrodenitrogenation
- The Tris(mercaptoimidazolyl) borate Tm ligand
- Terminal chalcogen metal bonding
- Zinc complexes as models for biological systems
- Antimony alkoxides and aryloxides
- Cleaving the mercury–carbon bond.

== Honors ==
Parkin received the 2008 ACS Award in Organometallic Chemistry and the 1994 ACS Award in pure chemistry from the American Chemical Society. He also received the Corday–Morgan Medal from the Royal Society of Chemistry in 1995. In 2009 he received the Presidential Award for Excellence in Science, Mathematics and Engineering Mentoring, an award that was presented at a White House ceremony.
