= Hugh Felkin =

Hugh Felkin (1922–2001) was a research chemist in France from 1950 to 1990 and a member of the Royal Society of Chemistry.

In 1967, he proposed a model to predict the stereochemical outcome of the addition of nucleophiles to carbonylic compounds. This model (now known as the Felkin-Anh model) differs slightly from Cram's rule and it is one of the most accepted rules to predict the outcome of these reactions.

He finished his career as Directeur de Recherche at the Institut de Chimie des Substances Naturelles in Gif-sur-Yvette. His laboratory worked on organometallic chemistry, with a special focus on organorhenium chemistry.

Born in England on 18 January 1922, he spent the second world war years in Geneva studying chemistry. At that time the requirements for a degree were "to show sufficient knowledge in chemistry".

After completing his studies, he went to France to work for the French National Centre for Scientific Research. In France he met Irène, born Elphimoff, also a research chemist, who became his wife and survived him by 9 years. They had one daughter, Mary, born in 1962.

He was a member of the communist party until the communist coup in Prague in 1948. After this disappointment, his sympathies still firmly inclined towards the left, he read Le Monde without which he used to say he didn't know what to think. Other sayings for which he was noted were "Je suis anti-sioniste mais je n'arrive pas à être pro-arabe", and in case of any uncertainty on the part of the presenter in group meetings, "il ne s'agit pas de croire, il s'agit de savoir".

Distinguished alumni of Hugh's lab include Bernard Meunier (president of the CNRS 2004-2006), Steve Davies creator of major spinouts at Oxford University and Bob Crabtree.

== Publications ==
- Marc Chérest, Hugh Felkin and Nicole Prudent (1968). "Torsional strain involving partial bonds. The stereochemistry of the lithium aluminium hydride reduction of some simple open-chain ketones". Tetrahedron Lett. 18 (18): 2199–2204. doi:10.1016/S0040-4039(00)89719-1.
- Marc Chérest and Hugh Felkin (1968). "Torsional strain involving partial bonds. The steric course of the reaction between allyl magnesium bromide and 4-t-butyl-cyclohexanone". Tetrahedron Lett. 18 (18): 2205–2208. doi:10.1016/S0040-4039(00)89720-8.
