= Barton nitrite ester reaction =

Photochemical reaction

The Barton reaction, also known as the Barton nitrite ester reaction, is a photochemical reaction that involves the photolysis of an alkyl nitrite to form a δ-nitroso alcohol.

Discovered in 1960, the reaction is named for its discoverer, Nobel laureate Sir Derek Barton. Barton's Nobel Prize in Chemistry in 1969 was awarded for his work on understanding conformations of organic molecules, work which was key to realizing the utility of the Barton Reaction.

The Barton reaction involves a homolytic RO–NO cleavage, followed by δ-hydrogen abstraction, free radical recombination, and tautomerization to form an oxime. Selectivity for the δ-hydrogen is a result of the conformation of the 6-membered radical intermediate. Often, the site of hydrogen atom abstraction can be easily predicted. This allows the regio- and stereo-selective introduction of functionality into complicated molecules with high yield. Due to its unique property at the time to change otherwise inert substrates, Barton used this reaction extensively in the 1960s to create a number of unnatural steroid analogues.

While the Barton reaction has not enjoyed the popularity or widespread use of many other organic reactions, together with the mechanistically similar Hofmann–Löffler reaction it represents one of the first examples of C-H activation chemistry, a field which is now the topic of much frontline research in industrial and academic chemistry circles.

== Preparation of alkyl nitrites ==
The unusual alkyl nitrite starting material of the Barton reaction is prepared by attack of an alcohol on a nitrosylium cation generated in situ by dehydration of doubly protonated nitrous acid. This series of steps is mechanistically identical to the first half of the mechanism formation of the more well-known aryl and alkyl diazonium salts.

While the synthesis of alkyl nitrites from nitrosyl chloride is known and oft-employed in the context of complex molecule synthesis, the reaction is reversible and the products are in thermodynamic equilibrium with the starting material. Furthermore, nitrosyl chloride is a powerful oxidizing agent, and oxidation of the alcohols with concomitant chlorination has been observed. The reaction of nitrosyl chloride with aromatic alcohols generally yields nitroso compounds and other over-oxidation products.

== Reaction mechanism and regioselectivity ==
The Barton reaction commences with a photochemically induced cleavage of the nitrite O-N bond, typically using a high pressure mercury lamp. This produces an alkyoxyl radical which immediately abstracts a hydrogen atom from the δ-carbon. In the absence of other radical sources or other proximal reactive groups, the alkyl radical recombines with the nitrosyl radical. The resultant nitroso compounds undergoes tautomerization to the isolated oxime product.

The carbon centered radical can be intercepted by other radical sources such as iodine or acrylonitrile. The first instance results in the δ-hydrogen being replaced with iodine, then subsequent cyclization to a tetrahydrofuran by an SN2 reaction. The second example results in a chain elongation product with the oxime formed 2 carbon units further from the oxygen than normal.

This mechanistic hypothesis is supported by kinetic isotope effect experiments. Isotopic labeling of the nitrite with 15N has shown the mechanism non-‘caged’ and that the nitrosyl radical formed from a given nitrite recombines randomly with other alkyl radicals. However, recombination of the nitrosyl radical with the alkoxyl radical (a reversal of the homolytic cleavage) has been shown to proceed without scrambling of isotope labels. This lack of tight radical pairing is also supported by the observation that alkyl radicals generated by Barton conditions can undergo radical cyclization while analogous intermediates generated by lead tetraacetate oxidation do not.

In rare cases, it appears that the alkoxyl radical may epimerize before hydrogen atom abstraction.

Most commonly, including steroidal systems, the hydrogen atom is abstracted from a methyl group that has a 1,3 diaxial relationship with the alkoxyl radical. In the absence of a hydrogen on the δ-carbon, or when the particular conformation of the substrate orients the ε-carbon close together, 1,6-hydrogen atom transfer is the favored process. However, these reactions tend to be an order of magnitude slower than the corresponding 1,5-hydrogen atom transfer.

Computational studies have shown that this preference for 1,5-hydrogen atom transfer over 1,6-hydrogen atom transfer appears to be entropically favored rather than a result of a particular stable ‘chair-like’ transition state. In fact, it has been calculated that the 1,6-hydrogen atom transfer proceeds through a transition that is about 0.8 kcal/mol lower than that of the 1,5.

In acyclic systems, δ-hydrogen abstraction is still observed, however, alpha-hydrogen abstraction to form the corresponding ketone competes.

In certain cases, particularly nitrites derived from cyclopentyl alcohols, the oxygen-centered radical prefers to react via C-C bond cleavage as opposed to H-atom abstraction. For example, when subjected to Barton conditions, cyclopentyl nitrite forms glutaraldehyde monoxime. This is also observed in cases where the radical intermediate formed by fragmentation is particularly stable, such as the allylic radical formed by the fragmentation of isopulegol nitrite.

== Variants ==
In rigid systems such as aldosterone, the 1,5-hydrogen atom transfer is exceedingly fast, with a rate constant on the order of 10^{7} s^{−1}. Similar intermolecular H-atom transfer can be up to 100 times slower. Furthermore, the hydrogen atom transfer benefits from the formation of a stronger O-H bond at the expense of a weaker C-H bond. For the formation of a primary, second, or tertiary alkyl radical from an alkoxyl radical, there is a driving force of 3 kcal/mol, 5 kcal/mol, and 9 kcal/mol, respectively.

The alkyl radical formed after hydrogen atom transfer is susceptible to standard radical reactions when scavengers are present in sufficient excess to outcompete the nitrosyl radical. Soon after their initial disclosure, Barton and co-workers reported the trapping of the radical with I_{2} and CCl_{3}Br (as, respectively, I^{•} and Br^{•} sources) to form the δ-halo-alcohol. These halohydrin species can be cyclized to the corresponding tetrahydropyran derivates under basic conditions.

Large excesses of activated alkenes can be used to intercept the alkyl radical and results in formation of a C-C bond from an unactivated C-H bond.

In the presence of oxygen, the alkyl radical is trapped and forms an organic peroxy radical. This intermediate is trapped by the nitrosyl radical and then isomerizes to give a δ-nitrate ester which, while both acid- and base-stable, can be reduced to the corresponding alcohol under mild conditions.

Other relatively stable radicals can also be transferred instead of nitric oxide — for example, phenylsulfur.

== Applications in complex molecule synthesis ==
=== Aldosterone acetate ===
In a publication immediately following Barton's initial disclosure of the methodology in the Journal of the American Chemical Society, a synthesis of aldosterone acetate is demonstrated. Allowing corticosterone acetate to react with nitrosyl chloride in dry pyridine yields the nitrite. Subsequently, irradiation under inert atmosphere followed by treatment with aqueous sodium nitrite selectively gives the desired oxime. The oxime is then acetylated and hydrolyzed to yield the natural product hemiacetal.

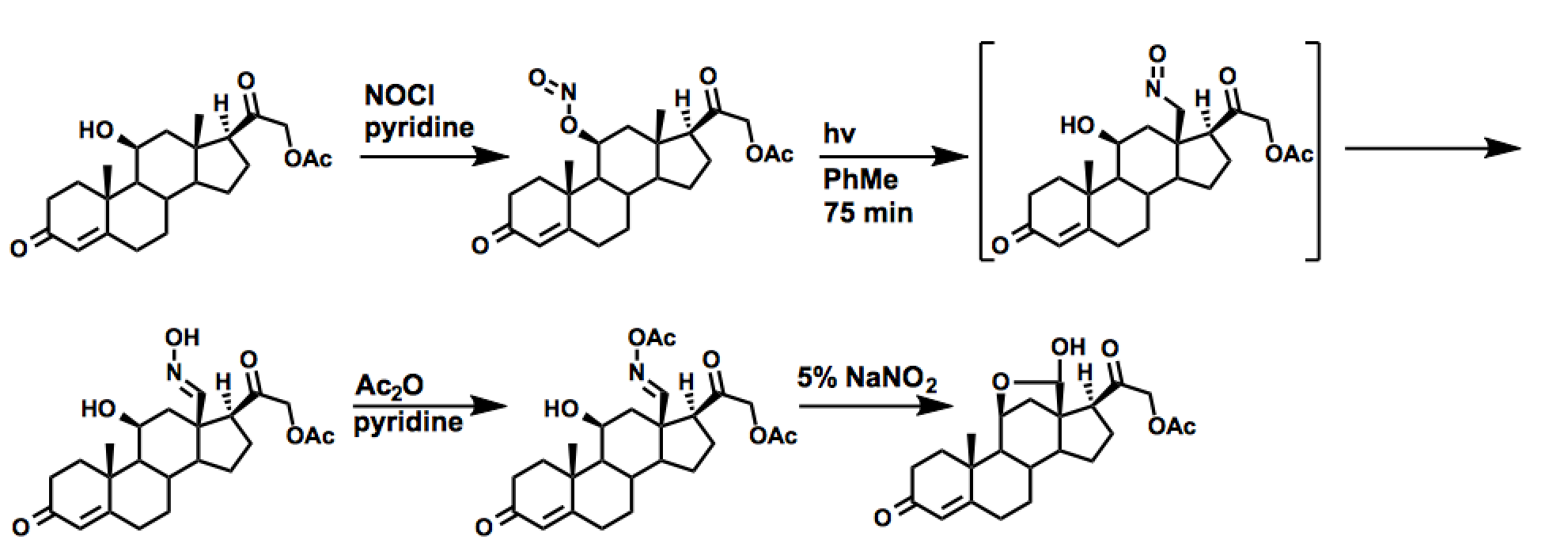

=== Perhydrohistrionicotoxin ===
After a short synthesis to obtain the desired spiro-[5.4] system, Nobel laureaute E.J. Corey and co-workers employed a Barton reaction to selectively introduce an oxime in a 1,3-diaxial position to the nitrite ester. The oxime is converted to a lactam via a Beckmann rearrangement and then reduced to the natural product.

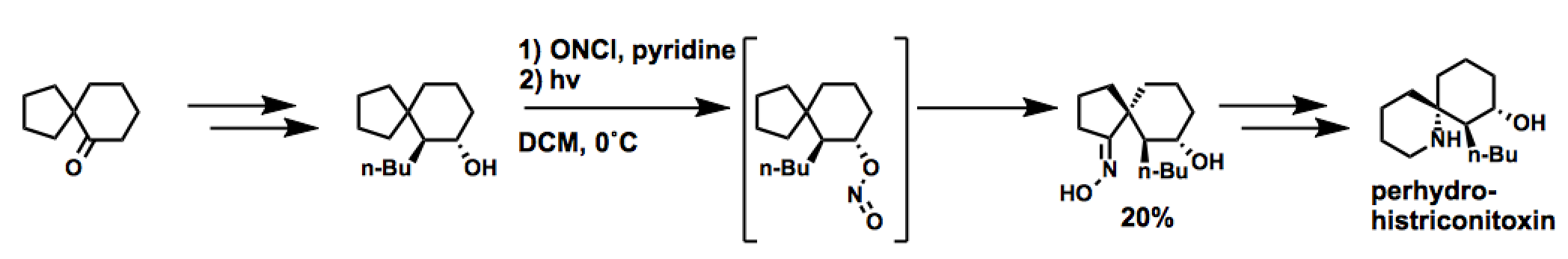

=== Azadiradione ===
Corey again employed the Barton reaction in the synthesis of Azadiradione, a member of the limonoid family of natural products. In this case, nitrosylsulfuric acid is used in place of nitrosyl chloride.

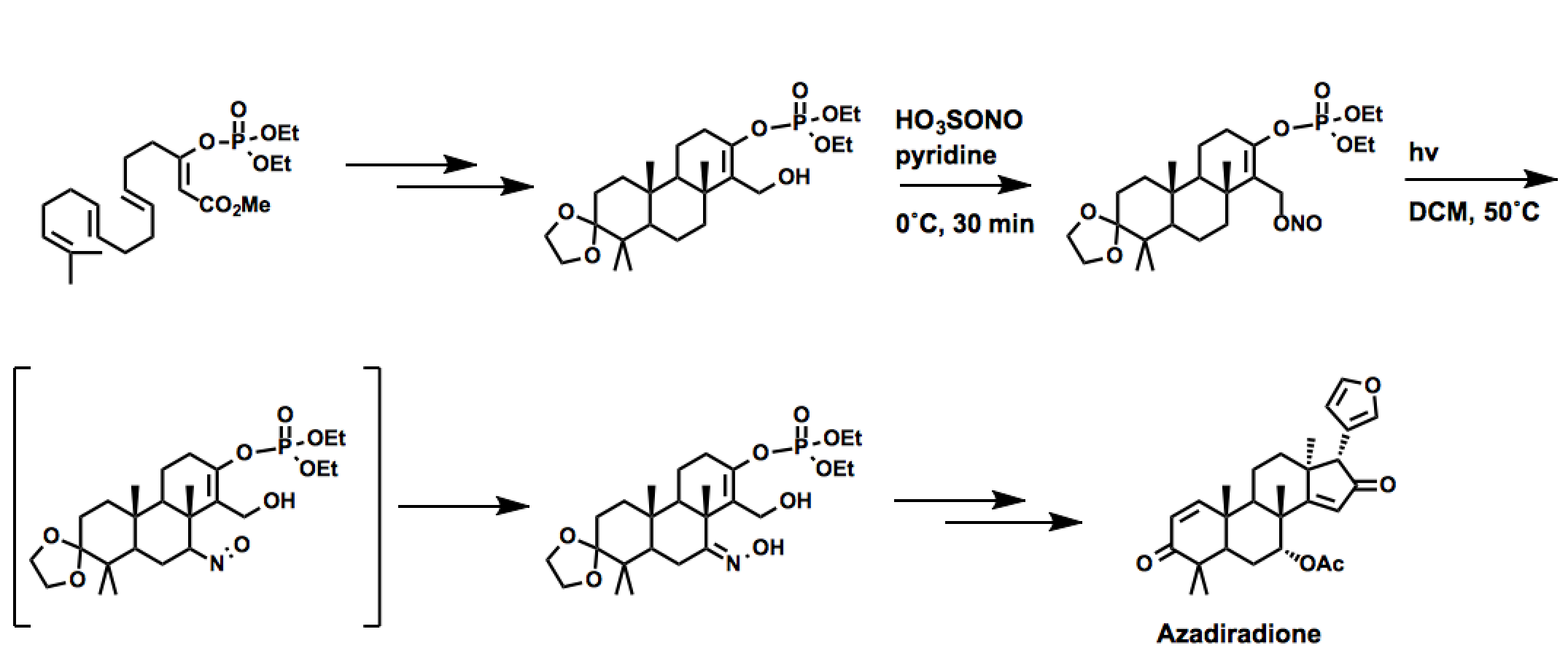

=== Allobetulin derivatives ===
In the process of preparing a series of derivatives of the triterpenoid allobetulin, Dehan and coworkers observed a remarkable transformation resulting from two consecutive 1,5-hydrogen atom transfers. While the product of the single 1,5-hydrogen atom transfer was also observed, the former transformation represent a formal 1,7-hydrogen atom transfer across an enormous distance.

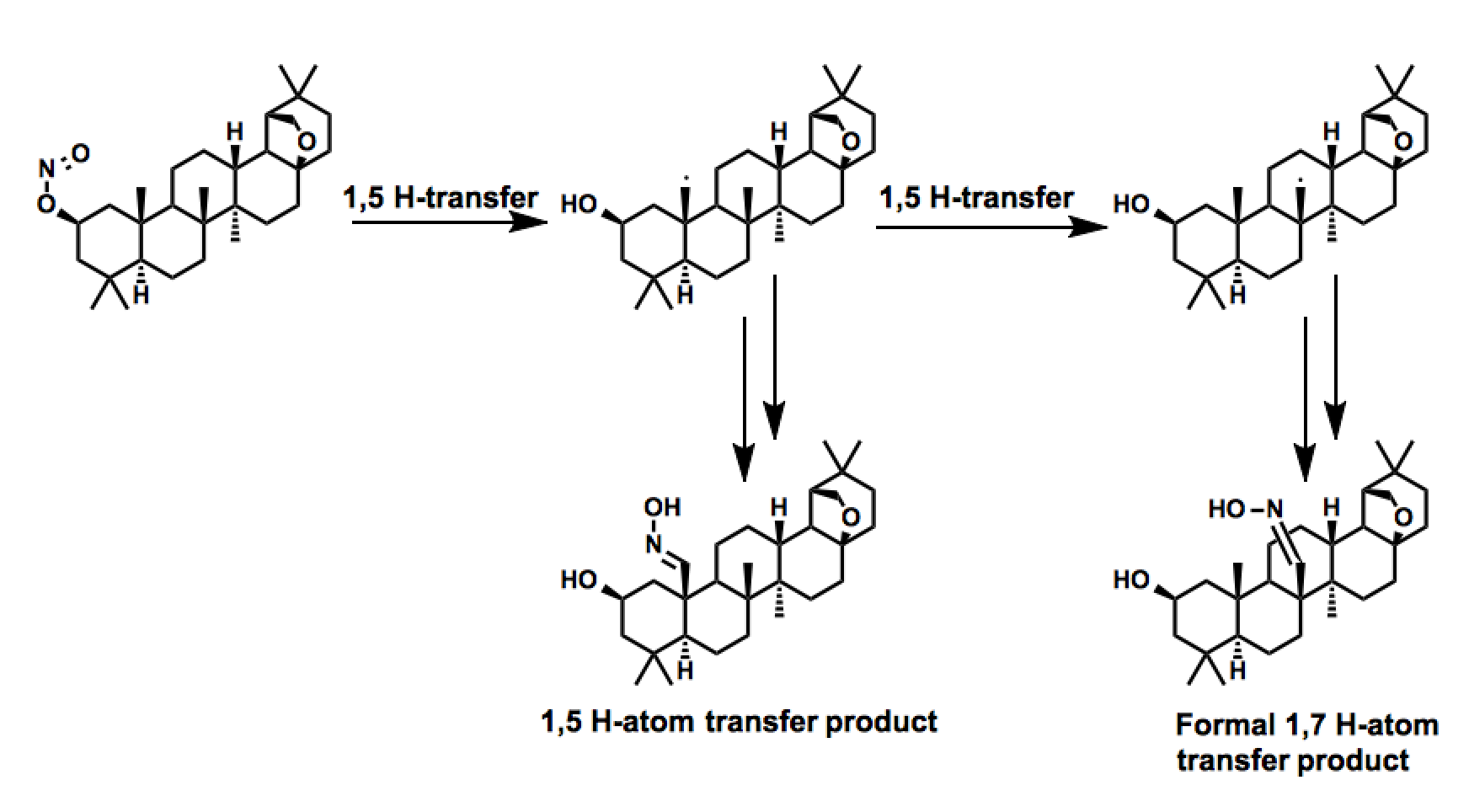
