= Stephen G. Davies =

British chemist

Steve Davies
- Born: Stephen Graham Davies; 24 February 1950 (age 76)
- Education: University of Oxford (BA, DPhil)
- Known for: Green–Davies–Mingos rules
- Spouse: Kay Davies (m. 1973–2000)
- Awards: Perkin Prize (2011); Tilden Prize (1997); Bader Award (1989); Hickinbottom Award (1984)
- Scientific career
- Workplaces: University of Oxford; Centre national de la recherche scientifique
- Thesis: Studies on epoxides (1975)
- Doctoral advisor: Gordon H. Whitham
- Doctoral students: Sue Gibson
- Website: www.chem.ox.ac.uk/people/stephen-davies

Stephen Graham Davies (born 24 February 1950) is a British chemist and was, until his retirement, the Waynflete Professor of Chemistry at the University of Oxford.

== Education ==
Davies obtained his Bachelor of Arts degree in 1973 from New College, Oxford, and his Doctor of Philosophy in 1975 under the supervision of Gordon H. Whitham.

== Career and research ==
After his PhD, Davies subsequently held an ICI Postdoctoral Fellowship working with Malcolm Green (1975-1977) and a NATO Fellowship working with Derek Barton (1977-1978) before joining the Centre national de la recherche scientifique (CNRS) at Gif-sur-Yvette as Attaché de Recherche working with Hugh Felkin.

In 1980 he returned to Oxford to take up a University Lectureship in Chemistry. Whilst remaining an active academic, in 1991 he founded Oxford Asymmetry Ltd (an asymmetric synthesis company) as sole investor. He also founded Oxford Diversity Ltd (a combinatorial chemistry company). These two companies were combined to form Oxford Asymmetry International Plc in 1999 which was sold to Evotec in 2000, valued at £316m. In 2003 he founded VASTox (Value Added Screening Technology Oxford) a zebrafish screening company. It floated on AIM in 2004 and has since acquired Dainolabs (zebrafish) and Dextra (a carbohydrate chemistry company) as well as the assets of MNL Pharma. VASTox then changed its name to Summit. In 2009 the zebrafish screening operations was acquired by Evotec for £0.5 Million. In 1996, he became Professor of Chemistry and in 2006, Waynflete Professor of Chemistry.

Davies is founder and former editor-in-chief for the journal Tetrahedron: Asymmetry."Editorial Board" (PDF). Elsevier.

Davies along with Malcolm Green and Michael Mingos have compiled a set of rules that summarize where nucleophilic additions will occur on pi ligands.

=== Awards ===
- Royal Society of Chemistry Hickinbottom Award (1984)
- Pfizer Award for Chemistry (1985 and 1988)
- Royal Society of Chemistry Award for Organometallic Chemistry (1987)
- Royal Society of Chemistry Bader Award (1989)
- Royal Society of Chemistry Tilden Lecture Award (1997/98)
- Royal Society of Chemistry Award in Stereochemistry (1997)
- Prize Lectureship of the Society of Synthetic Organic Chemistry, Japan (1998)
- Royal Society of Chemistry Perkin Prize for Organic Chemistry (2011)

== Personal life ==
Davies is the son of Gordon W. J. Davies and June M. Murphy. In 1973 he married Kay E. Partridge who was to become a foremost human geneticist. They have one son.

== See also ==
- Weinreb ketone synthesis
