= Green–Davies–Mingos rules =

Organometallic chemistry rule

In organometallic chemistry, the Green–Davies–Mingos rules predict the regiochemistry for nucleophilic addition to 18-electron metal complexes containing multiple unsaturated ligands. The rules were published in 1978 by organometallic chemists Stephen G. Davies, Malcolm Green, and Michael Mingos. They describe how and where unsaturated hydrocarbon generally become more susceptibile to nucleophilic attack upon complexation.

== Rule 1 ==
Nucleophilic attack is preferred on even-numbered polyenes (even hapticity).

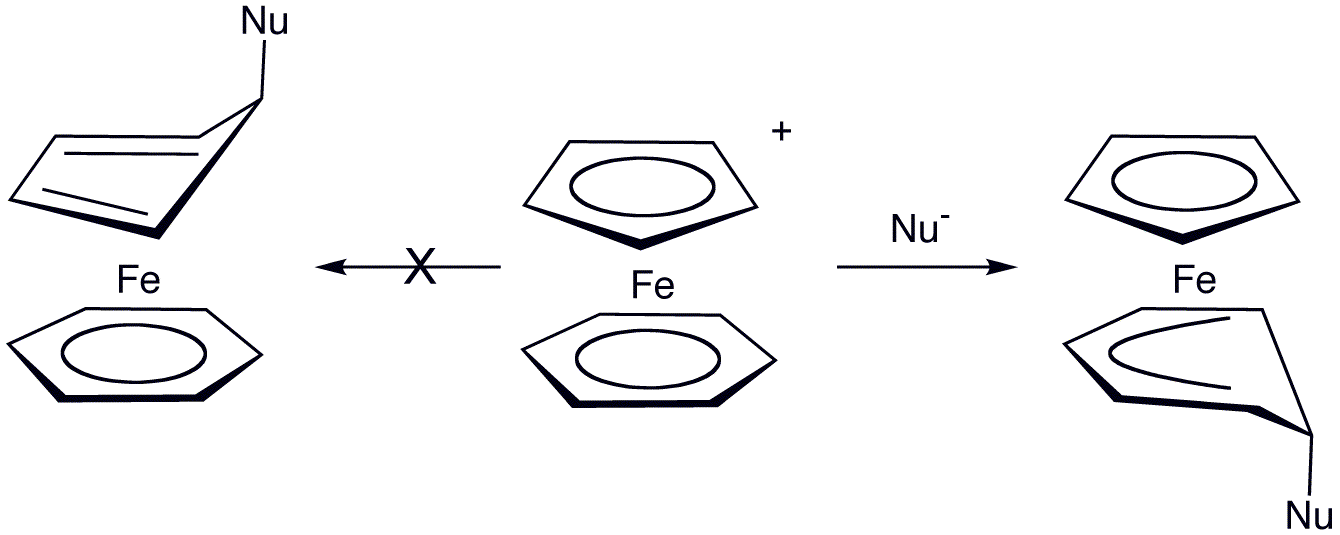

== Rule 2 ==
Nucleophiles preferentially add to acyclic polyenes rather than cyclic polyenes.

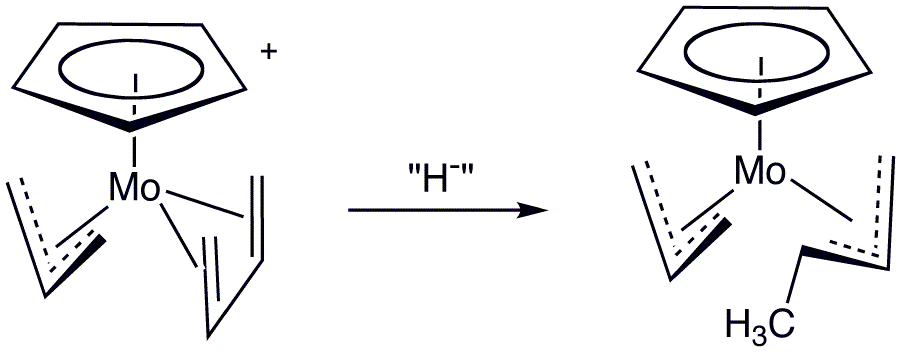

== Rule 3 ==
Nucleophiles preferentially add to even-hapticity polyene ligands at a terminus. Nucleophiles add to odd-hapticity acyclic polyene ligands at a terminal position if the metal is highly electrophilic, otherwise they add at an internal site.

Simplified: even before odd and open before closed

The following is a diagram showing the reactivity trends of even/odd hapticity and open/closed π-ligands.

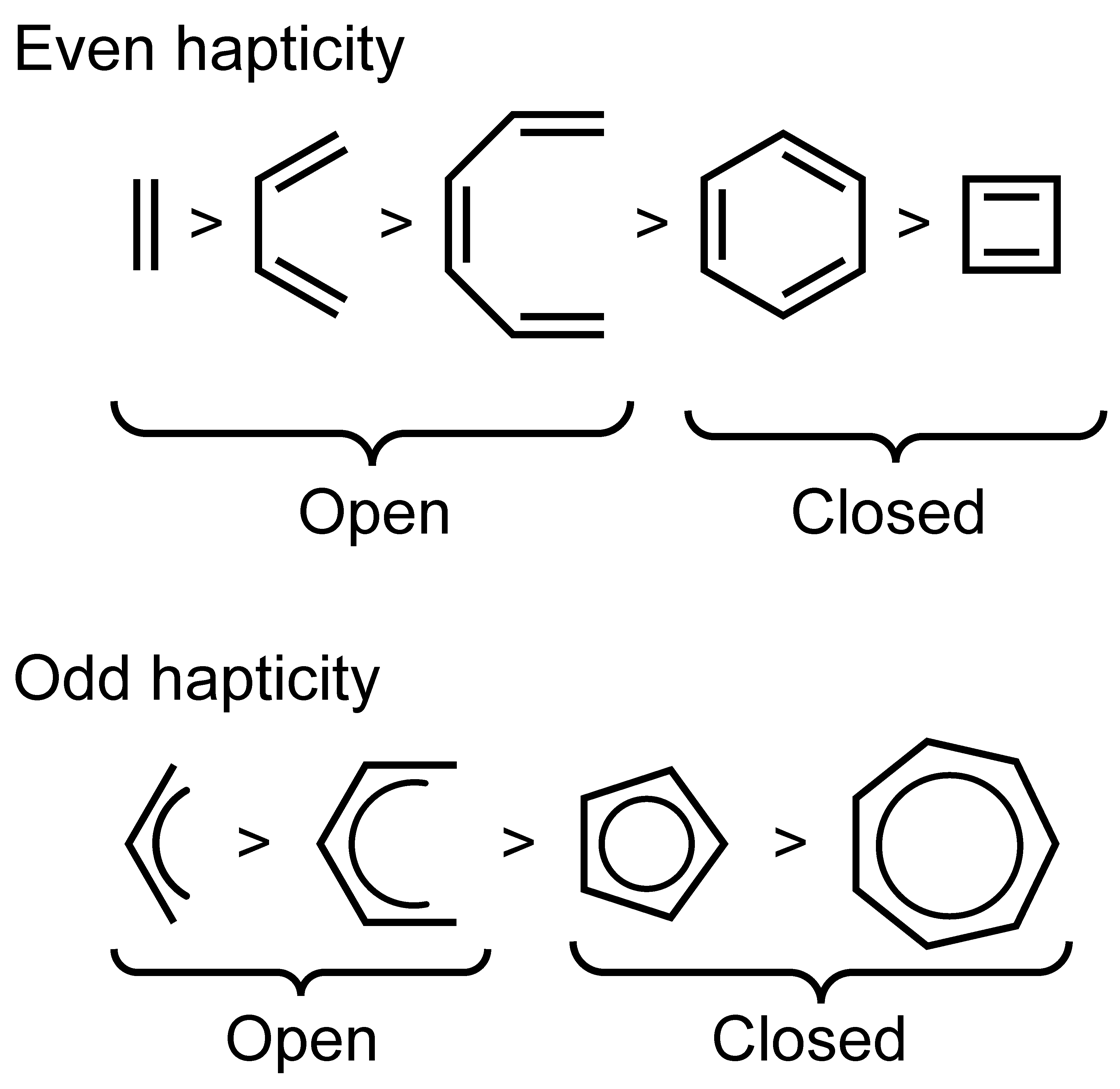

The metal center is electron withdrawing. This effect is enhanced if the metal is also attached to a carbonyl. Electron poor metals do not back bond well to the carbonyl. The more electron withdrawing the metal is, the more triple bond character the CO ligand has. This gives the ligand a higher force constant. The resultant force constant found for a ligated carbonyl represents the same force constant for π ligands if they replaced the CO ligand in the same complex.

Nucleophilic addition does not occur if kCO* (the effective force constant for the CO ligand) is below a threshold value

The following figure shows a ligated metal attached to a carbonyl group. This group has a partial positive charge and therefore is susceptible to nucleophilic attack. If the ligand represented by L_{n} were a π-ligand, it would be activated toward nucleophilic attack as well.

$$\ce{L_\mathit{n}-{}}\overset{\color{Red}\delta+}\ce{M}\ce{-C#}\overset{\color{Red}\delta+}\ce{O}$$

Incoming nucleophilic attack happens at one of the termini of the π-system in the figure below:

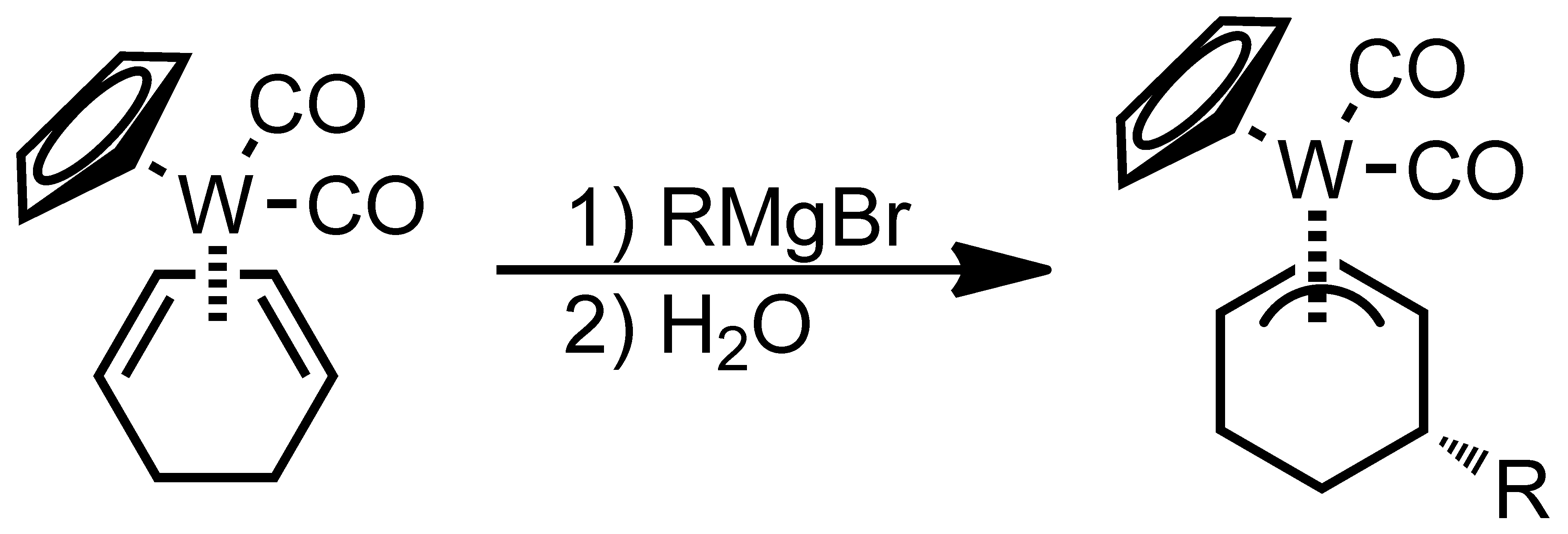

In this example the ring system can be thought of as analogous to 1,3-butadiene. Following the Green–Davies–Mingos rules, since butadiene is an open π-ligand of even hapticity, nucleophilic attack will occur at one of the terminal positions of the π-system. This occurs because the LUMO of butadiene has larger lobes on the ends rather than the internal positions.

== Effects of types of ligands on regiochemistry of attack ==
Nucleophilic attack at terminal position of allyl ligands when π accepting ligand is present.

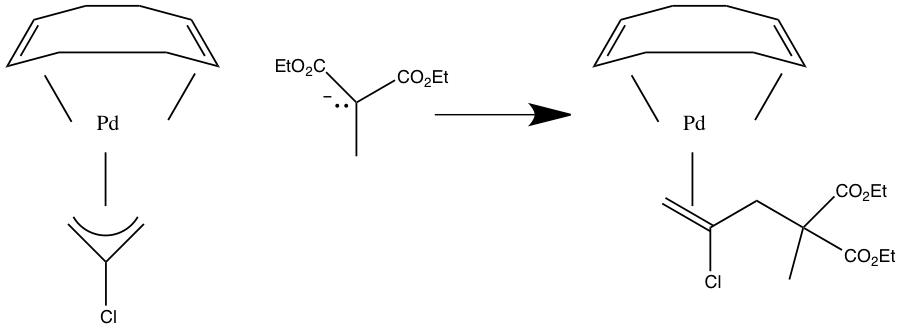

If sigma donating ligands are present they pump electrons into the ligand and attack occurs at the internal position.

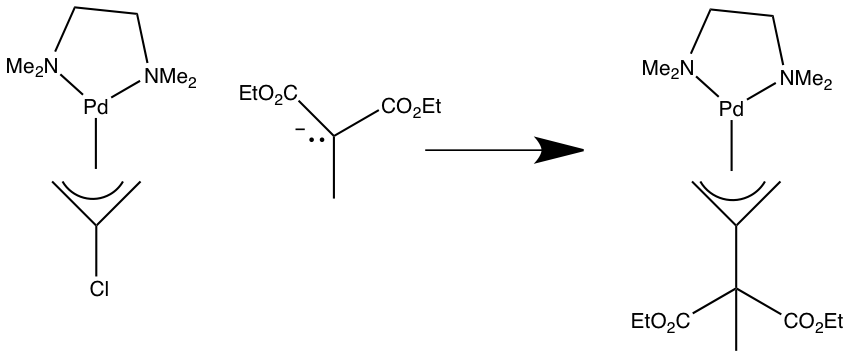

== Effects of asymmetrical ligands ==
When asymmetrical allyl ligands are present attack occurs at the more substituted position.

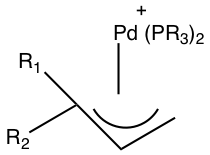

In this case the attack will occur on the carbon with both R groups attached to it since that is the more substituted position.

== Uses in synthesis ==
Nucleophilic addition to π ligands can be used in synthesis. One example of this is to make cyclic metal compounds. Nucleophiles add to the center of the π ligand and produces a metallobutane.

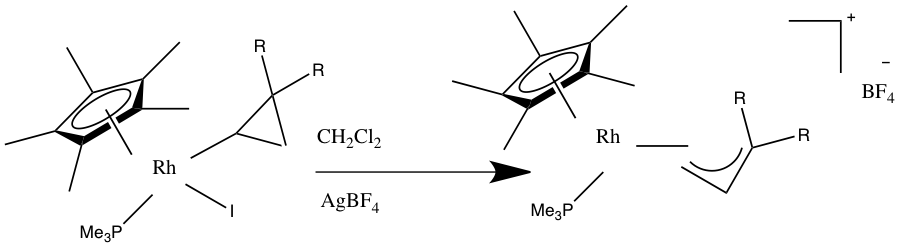

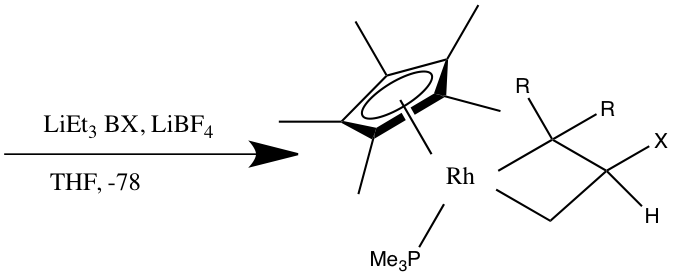

== Internal attack ==
- Periana Roy A.; Bergman Robert G. (1984). "Rapid intramolecular rearrangement of a hydrido(cyclopropyl)rhodium complex to a rhodacyclobutane. Independent synthesis of the metallacycle by addition of hydride to the central carbon atom of a cationic rhodium π-allyl complex". Journal of the American Chemical Society. 106 (23): 7272–7273. Bibcode:1984JAChS.106.7272P. doi:10.1021/ja00335a084.
- Suzuki, Tomohiro; Okada, Goro; Hioki, Yasunori; Fujimoto, Hiroshi (2003). "Theoretical Study of the Reactivity of (π-Allyl)molybdenum Complexes". Organometallics. 22 (18): 3649–3658. doi:10.1021/om0207459.
- Schörshusen, Sonja; Heck, Jürgen (2007). "Metal-Mediated Transformations of Cyclooctatetraene to Novel Methylene-Bridged, Bicyclic Compounds". Organometallics. 26 (22): 5386–5394. doi:10.1021/om700539e.
