= Barton–Zard reaction =

Reaction in organic chemistry

The Barton–Zard reaction is a route to pyrrole derivatives via the reaction of a nitroalkene with an α-isocyanide under basic conditions. It is named after Derek Barton and Samir Zard who first reported it in 1985.

== Mechanism ==
The mechanism consists of five steps:

- Base catalyzed carbonyl enolization of the α-isocyanide.
- Michael-type addition between the α-isocyanide carbonyl enolate and the nitroalkene.
- 5-endo-dig cyclization (see: Baldwin's rules).
- Base catalyzed elimination of the nitro group.
- Tautomerization leading to aromatisation.

=== Scope ===
The nitro compound may be aromatic rather than just an alkene. The reaction has been used for the synthesis of polypyrroles, including porphyrins, as well as dipyrromethenes such as BODIPY.
