= 2-tert-Butyl-1,1,3,3-tetramethylguanidine =

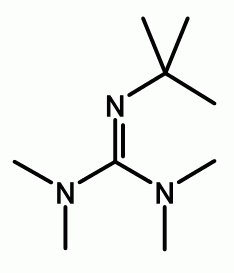

Names
- Preferred IUPAC name N′′-tert-Butyl-N,N,N′,N′-tetramethylguanidine
- Other names BTMG, Barton's base

Identifiers
CAS Number	29166-72-1
3D model (JSmol)	Interactive image
ChemSpider	2808676
ECHA InfoCard	100.157.697
PubChem CID	3571581
UNII	G5WY8E7YAG
CompTox Dashboard (EPA)	DTXSID10393758
- InChI: InChI=1S/C9H21N3/c1-9(2,3)10-8(11(4)5)12(6)7/h1-7H3 Key: YQHJFPFNGVDEDT-UHFFFAOYSA-N
- SMILES: CC(C)(C)N=C(N(C)C)N(C)C

Properties
Chemical formula	C_{9}H_{21}N_{3}
Molar mass	171.288 g·mol^{−1}

Hazards
- GHS labelling
Pictograms	(GHS05: Corrosive) (GHS07: Exclamation mark)
Signal word	Danger
Hazard statements	H302, H314
Precautionary statements	P260, P264, P270, P280, P301+P312, P301+P330+P331, P303+P361+P353, P304+P340, P305+P351+P338, P310, P321, P330, P363, P405, P501
- Except where otherwise noted, data are given for materials in their standard state (at 25 °C [77 °F], 100 kPa). Infobox references

2-tert-Butyl-1,1,3,3-tetramethylguanidine is an organic base, also known as Barton's base. It is named after Nobel Prize-winning British chemist Derek Barton. Barton and his assistants prepared a series of guanidines with steric hindrance in 1982; in this case five alkyl groups: four methyl groups and one tert-butyl group. In 50% water ethanol mixture, the acidity constant (pK_{a}) of Barton's base is 14. In acetonitrile its pK_{a} is 24.31.

== Synthesis ==
The base is prepared by the reaction of tert-butylamine with a Vilsmeier salt. The latter is the reaction product of phosphorus oxychloride with tetramethylurea.

== Applications ==
Barton's base can be used in many organic reactions, including in alkylations and in the formation of aziridines. It is often a milder alternative to traditional, strong inorganic bases.
