= Barton–McCombie deoxygenation =

Organic reaction

Named after	Derek Harold Richard Barton; Stuart W. McCombie
Reaction type	Organic redox reaction

Identifiers
Organic Chemistry Portal	barton-mccombie-reaction
RSC ontology ID	RXNO:0000134

The Barton–McCombie deoxygenation is an organic reaction in which a hydroxy functional group in an organic compound is replaced by a hydrogen to give an alkyl group. It is named after British chemists Sir Derek Harold Richard Barton and Stuart W. McCombie.

The Barton-McCombie deoxygenation

This deoxygenation reaction is a radical substitution. In the related Barton decarboxylation the reactant is a carboxylic acid.

== Mechanism ==
The reaction mechanism consists of a catalytic radical initiation step and a propagation step. The alcohol (1) is first converted into a reactive carbonothioyl intermediate such as a thionoester or xanthate 2. Heating of AIBN results in its homolytic cleavage, generating two 2-cyanoprop-2-yl radicals 9, which each abstract a hydrogen from tributylstannane 3 to generate tributylstannyl radicals 4 and inactive 10. The tributyltin radical abstracts the xanthate group from 2 by attack of 4 at the sulfur atom with concurrent homolytic cleavage of the C-S π bond. This leaves a carbon centered radical that forms a C-O π bond through homolytic cleavage of the R-O σ bond, giving alkyl radical 5 and tributyltin xanthate 7. The sulfur tin bond in this compound is very stable and provides the driving force for this reaction. The alkyl radical 5 then abstracts a hydrogen atom from a new molecule of tributylstannane generating the desired deoxygenated product (6) and a new radical species ready for propagation.

Barton-McCombie deoxygenation reaction mechanism

== Variations ==
Nearby radical-stabilizing moieties can capture the radical intermediate from the thionoester fission, as in a total synthesis of azadirachtin:

=== Alternative thiocarbonyls ===
Other thiocarbonyl reagents can replace the thioacyl chloride. In one variation the reagent is the imidazole 1,1'-thiocarbonyldiimidazole (TCDI), for example in the total synthesis of pallescensin B. TCDI is especially good to primary alcohols because there is no resonance stabilization of the thiocarbamate; the nitrogen lonepair is involved in the aromatic sextet.

The reaction also applies to S-alkylxanthates.

=== Alternative hydrogen sources ===
The main disadvantage to Barton–McCombie deoxygenation is the toxic and expensive tributylstannane, the endproducts of which are difficult to remove from the reaction mixture. One alternative is tributyltin oxide as the radical source and poly(methylhydridesiloxane) (PMHS) as the hydrogen source.

Barton-McCombie deoxygenation with (initially) phenyl chlorothionoformate and then tributylstannic oxide and polymethylhydrosiloxane. The thiobenzoyl radical intermediates formed when the ester homolyzes fragment into carbonyl sulfide and phenyl radicals before forming tributyltin phenolate.

Both roles are combined in the trialkylboranes, which can abstract the required hydrogen atoms from protic solvents, the reactor wall or even (in strictly anhydrous conditions) the borane itself. Typically the reagents are trimethylborane or triethylborane contaminated with small amounts of water.

Barton-McCombie deoxygenation with trialkane borane and water

The catalytic cycle begins when air oxidizes the trialkylborane 3 to the borinic acid and methyl radical 4. This radical methylates the xanthate 2, which fragments to S-methyl-S-methyl dithiocarbonate 7 and the radical intermediate 5. 5 abstracts a hydrogen from the borane 3 to reform 4 and produce the alkane 6.

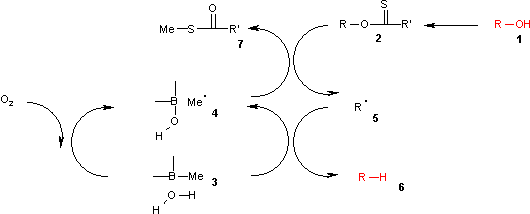
Barton-McCombie deoxygenation reaction mechanism

Theoretical calculations suggest that O-H homolysis in a borane-water complex is endothermic, but the energy barrier is comparable to tributylstannane and not pure water homolysis.

=== Related reactions: vicinal diols to alkenes ===
1,2-Diols can be converted to the bis(xanthate), which react with tributyltin hydride to give the alkene:

RCH(OH)−CH(OH)R' + 2 CS_{2} + 2 NaH → RCH(OCS_{2}Na)−CH(OCS_{2}Na)R' + 2 H_{2}
RCH(OCS_{2}Na)−CH(OCS_{2}Na)R' + 2 CH_{3}I → RCH(OCS_{2}CH_{3})−CH(OCS_{2}CH_{3})R' + 2 NaI
RCH(OCS_{2}CH_{3})−CH(OCS_{2}CH_{3})R' + 2 Bu_{3}SnH → RCH=CHR' + 2 Bu_{3}SnOCS_{2}CH_{3},

where Bu = −C_{4}H_{9}. The identity of the final tin product is not well defined.

== See also ==
- Chugaev elimination
