= Tm ligands =

Tm is an abbreviation for anionic tridentate ligand based on three imidazole-2-thioketone groups bonded to a borohydride center. They are examples of scorpionate ligands. Various ligands in this family are known, differing in what substituents are on the imidazoles. The most common is Tm^{Me}, which has a methyl group on the nitrogen. It is easily prepared by the reaction of molten methimazole (1-methylimidazole-2-thione) with sodium borohydride, giving the sodium salt of the ligand. Salts of the Tm^{Me} anion are known also for lithium and potassium. Other alkyl- and aryl-group variations are likewise named Tm^{R} according to those groups.

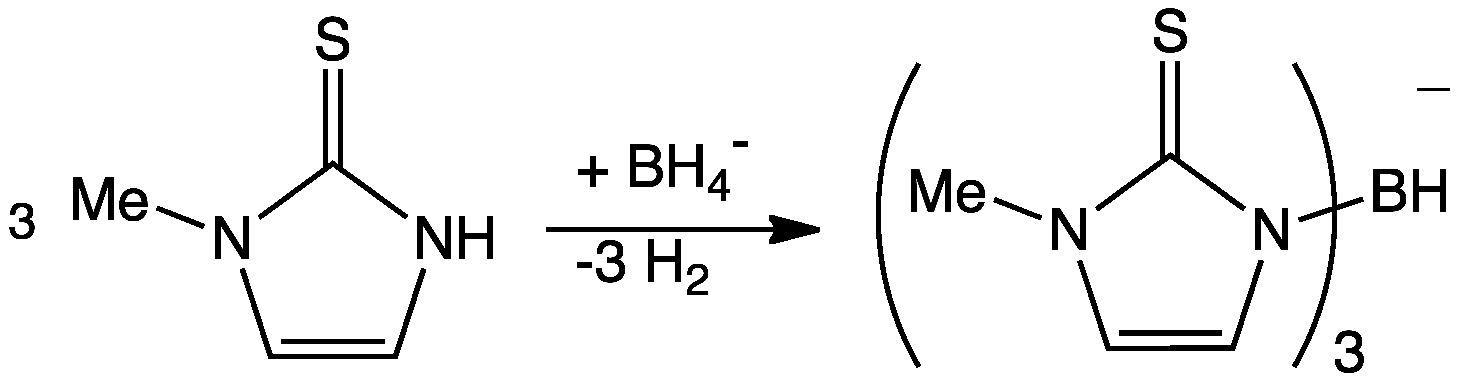

== Ligand characteristics, comparison with Tp^{−} ==
The Tm^{Me} anion is a tridentate, tripodal ligand topologically similar to the more common Tp ligands, but the two classes of ligands differ in several ways. Tm^{Me} has three "soft" sulfur donor atoms, whereas Tp^{−} has three nitrogen donor atoms. The thioamide sulfur is highly basic, as found for other thioureas. The Tm^{R} anion simulates the environment provided by three facial thiolate ligands but without the 3- charge of a facial trithiolate.

The large 8-membered SCNBNCSM chelate rings in M(Tm^{Me}) complexes are more flexible than the 6-membered CNBNCM rings in M(Tp) complexes. This flexibility enables the formation of boron-metal bonds, after loss of the B-H bond. This degradation of the coordinated Tm^{Me} anion gives a dehydrogenated boranamide B(mt)_{3} where mt = methimazolate.

Representative Structures (S in yellow, B in dark blue)

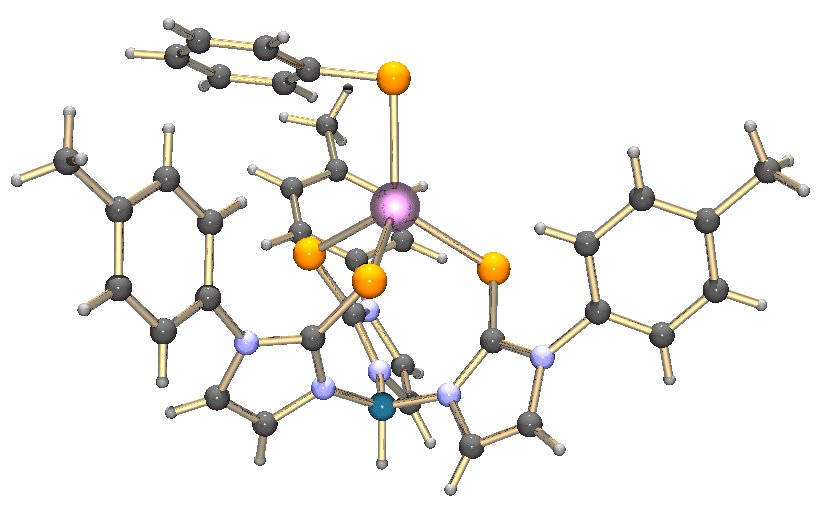
Structure of Tm^{pTol}ZnSPh, a tetrahedral complex.

Structure of Tm^{Me}Ru(CO)(PPh_{3})H, an octahedral complex.
