= Malcolm Green (chemist) =

British chemist (1936–2020)

Malcolm Green FRS FRSC
- Born: Malcolm Leslie Hodder Green; 16 April 1936
- Died: 24 July 2020 (aged 84)
- Education: Denstone College; University of London (BSc Hons); University of Cambridge (MA); University of Oxford (MA); Imperial College London (PhD)
- Known for: Agostic interaction Covalent bond classification method Green–Davies–Mingos rules
- Awards: Corday-Morgan Prize (1972); Tilden Prize (1982); FRS (1985); Stieglitz Lecture (1985); Davy Medal (1995)
- Scientific career
- Workplaces: University of Oxford; University of Cambridge
- Thesis: A study of some transitional metal hydrides and olefin complexes (1958)
- Doctoral advisor: Geoffrey Wilkinson
- Doctoral students: Vernon C. Gibson, Gerard Parkin, Andrea Sella
- Website: research.chem.ox.ac.uk/malcolm-green.aspx

Malcolm Leslie Hodder Green FRS FRSC (16 April 1936 – 24 July 2020) was Professor of Inorganic Chemistry at the University of Oxford. He made many contributions to organometallic chemistry.

== Education ==
Born in Eastleigh, Hampshire, he was educated at Denstone College and received his Bachelor of Science degree from Acton Technical College (London University External Regulations) in 1956 and his PhD from Imperial College of Science and Technology in 1959 for research carried out under the supervision of Geoffrey Wilkinson.

== Career ==
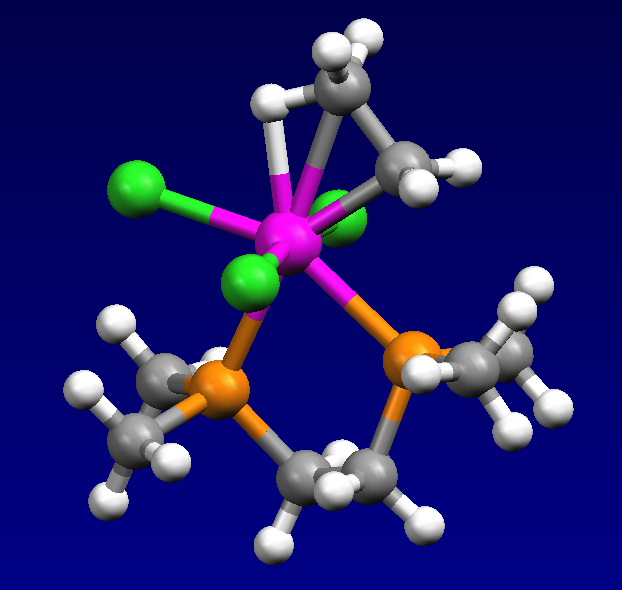
Structure of (C_{2}H_{5})TiCl_{3}(dmpe), highlighting an agostic interaction between the methyl group and the Ti centre.

After his PhD, Green undertook a postdoctoral research year with Wilkinson before moving to the University of Cambridge in 1960 as Assistant Lecturer and being appointed a Fellow of Corpus Christi College, Cambridge in 1961. In 1963 he was appointed a Septcentenary Fellow of Inorganic Chemistry at Balliol College, Oxford and a Departmental Demonstrator at the University of Oxford. In 1965, he was made a Lecturer, and he was also a Royal Society Senior Research Fellow in Oxford 1979–86. In 1989, he was appointed Professor of Inorganic Chemistry and Head of the Inorganic Chemistry Laboratory at Oxford and Fellow of St Catherine's College, Oxford. In 2004, he became an Emeritus Research Professor. He was a co-founder of the Oxford Catalysts Group plc in 2006.

Green held many visiting positions including: Visiting Professor, Ecole de Chimie and Institute des Substances Naturelles, Paris (1972), Alfred P. Sloan Visiting Professor, Harvard University (1975), Sherman Fairchild Visiting Scholar at the California Institute of Technology (1981), and Walter Hieber Gastprofessor, LMU Munich, Germany (1991).

== Research ==
Green's earliest publications described metal-hydride and metal-olefin complexes, themes that he pursued throughout his career. Many of his early contributions focused on the chemistry of molybdocene dihydride ((C_{5}H_{5})_{2}MoH_{2}) and the related tungsten derivative. These compounds were shown to engage in many reactions related to C-H bond activation.

With Rooney, he was an active proponent of various mechanisms to explain stereochemistry in Ziegler–Natta polymerisation. He used metal vapour synthesis, especially for the preparation of early metal sandwich complexes. He and his students synthesised several examples of complexes exhibiting "agostic" bonds. The word was suggested to him by Jasper Griffin, professor of Classics at Balliol, whom Green asked for an appropriate Greek word to describe the close bonding phenomenon. This work would later lead to the so-called "modified Green-Rooney mechanism" for Ziegler–Natta catalysis, wherein agostic interactions guide the stereochemistry of the alkene insertion step. This proposal found wide acceptance. His work on metal carbide catalysts led to the corporate spin-off company Oxford Catalysts plc, which became Velocys.

Green along with Stephen G. Davies and Michael Mingos compiled a set of rules that summarise where nucleophilic additions will occur on pi ligands known as the Green–Davies–Mingos rules. His former doctoral students include Vernon C. Gibson.

Green developed the covalent bond classification (CBC) method in 1995 to describe the ligands and bonding in coordination and organometallic complexes.

Towards the end of his career Green's interests shifted to include studies of carbon nanotubes, developing methods to "uncap" (open) them, and investigating their filling with metals and with salts.

== Awards and honours ==
His numerous awards include:

- 1972: Awarded the Corday-Morgan medal in Inorganic Chemistry by the Royal Society of Chemistry (RSC)
- 1977: Medal in Transition Metal Chemistry from the RSC
- 1982: Tilden Prize and Lectureship, RSC
- 1984: American Chemical Society Award in Inorganic Chemistry
- 1985: Elected a Fellow of the Royal Society (FRS)
- 1985: Medal in Organometallic Chemistry, RSC
- 1988: Sir Edward Frankland Prize Lecturership, RSC
- 1995: Awarded the Davy Medal by the Royal Society
- 1997: Medal in Organometallic Chemistry from the American Chemical Society
- 1992: From the Gesellschaft Deutscher Chemiker, the Karl-Ziegler Prize
- 2000: Sir Geoffrey Wilkinson Medal and Prize, RSC
- Elected a Fellow of the Royal Society of Chemistry (FRSC)
- 2015: From the European Association for Chemical and Molecular Sciences, the European Prize for Organometallic Chemistry

== See also ==
- Single-walled carbon nanohorn
