= Barton decarboxylation =

Chemical reaction

Named after	Derek Barton
Reaction type	Substitution reaction

Identifiers
Organic Chemistry Portal	barton-decarboxylation
RSC ontology ID	RXNO:0000135

The Barton decarboxylation is a radical reaction in which a carboxylic acid is converted to a thiohydroxamate ester (commonly referred to as a Barton ester). The product is then heated in the presence of a radical initiator and a suitable hydrogen donor to afford the decarboxylated product. This is an example of a reductive decarboxylation. Using this reaction it is possible to remove carboxylic acid moieties from alkyl groups and replace them with other functional groups. (See Scheme 1) This reaction is named after its developer, the British chemist and Nobel laureate Sir Derek Barton (1918–1998).

Scheme 1

== Mechanism ==
The reaction is initiated by homolytic cleavage of a radical initiator, in this case 2,2'-azobisisobutyronitrile (AIBN), upon heating. A hydrogen is then abstracted from the hydrogen source (tributylstannane in this case) to leave a tributylstannyl radical that attacks the sulfur atom of the thiohydroxamate ester. The N-O bond of the thiohydroxamate ester undergoes homolysis to form a carboxyl radical which then undergoes decarboxylation and carbon dioxide (CO_{2}) is lost. The remaining alkyl radical (R·) then abstracts a hydrogen atom from remaining tributylstannane to form the reduced alkane (RH). (See Scheme 2) The tributyltin radical enters into another cycle of the reaction until all thiohydroxamate ester is consumed.

N-O bond cleavage of the Barton ester can also occur spontaneously upon heating or by irradiation with light to initiate the reaction. In this case a radical initiator is not required but a hydrogen-atom (H-atom) donor is still necessary to form the reduced alkane (RH). Alternative H-atom donors to tributylstannane include tertiary thiols and organosilanes. The relative expense, smell, and toxicity associated with tin, thiol or silane reagents can be avoided by carrying the reaction out using chloroform as both solvent and H-atom donor.

It is also possible to functionalize the alkyl radical by use of other radical trapping species (X-Y + R· -> R-X + Y·). The reaction proceeds due to the formation of the stable S-Sn bond and increasing aromaticity of the thiohydroxamate ester. There is also an overall increase in entropy due to the formation of gas which drives the reaction forward.

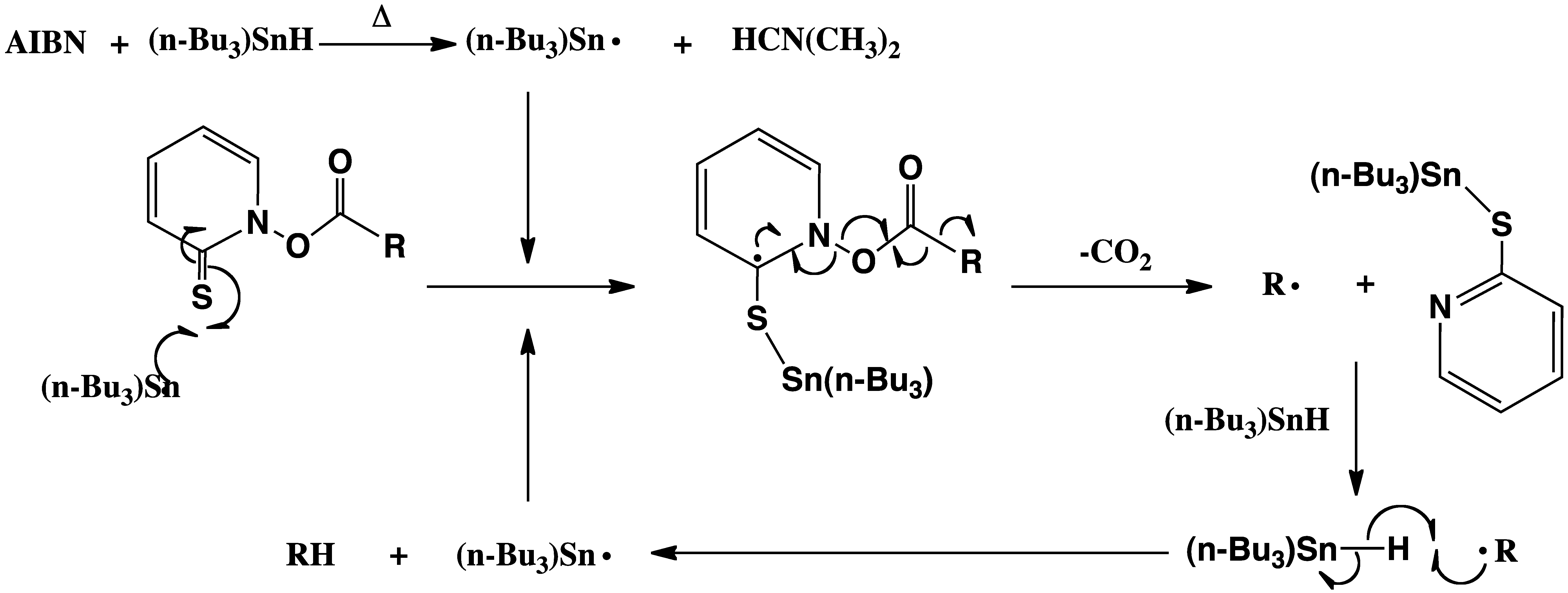

== See also ==
- Barton–McCombie deoxygenation
- Hunsdiecker reaction
- Kochi reaction
- Krapcho decarboxylation
- Kolbe electrolysis
- Pyrithione
