= Derek Barton =

English chemist and Nobel Prize laureate

Sir Derek Barton FRS FRSE
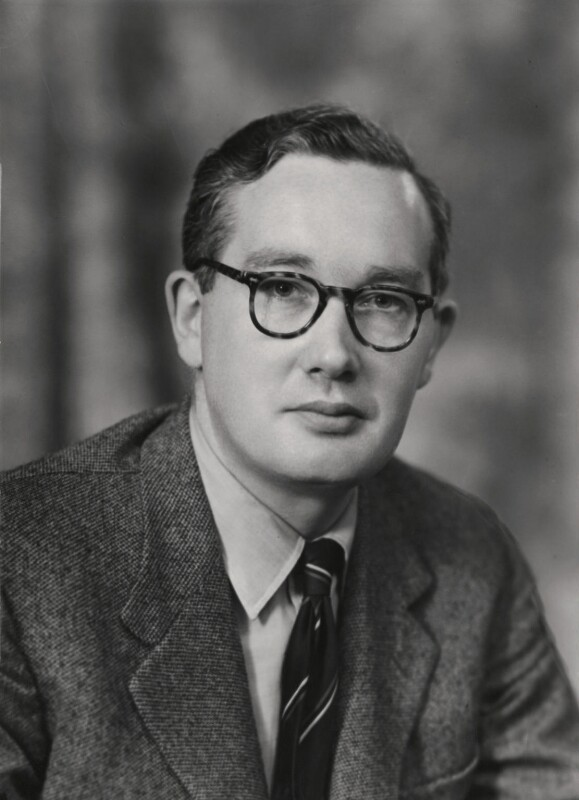
- Barton in 1954
- Born: Derek Harold Richard Barton; 8 September 1918; Gravesend, Kent, England
- Died: 16 March 1998 (aged 79); College Station, Texas, U.S.
- Resting place: La Grange Cemetery, Texas, U.S.
- Education: Imperial College London
- Known for: Barton reaction; Barton's base; Barton decarboxylation; Barton–Kellogg reaction; Barton–McCombie deoxygenation; Barton–Zard synthesis; Barton vinyl iodine procedure
- Awards: Corday-Morgan Prize (1949); Tilden Prize (1952); FRS (1954); Ernest Guenther Award (1957); Davy Medal (1961); Nobel Prize in Chemistry (1969); Royal Medal (1972); Knight Bachelor (1972); Copley Medal (1980); Priestley Medal (1995)
- Scientific career
- Fields: Chemistry
- Workplaces: Imperial College London; Institut de Chimie des Substances Naturelles; Texas A&M University; Birkbeck College London
- Doctoral advisor: Ian Heilbron
- Doctoral students: Jack Baldwin; Anthony Barrett; David Crich

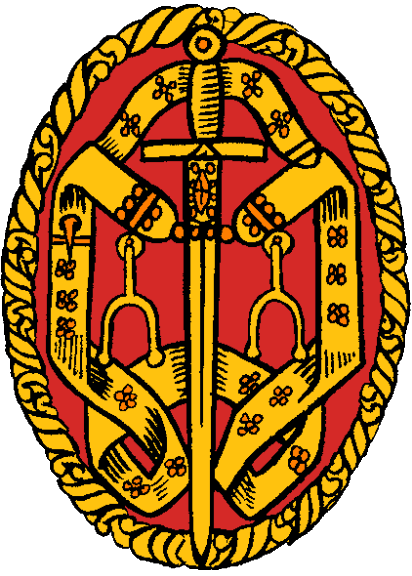
Insignia of a Knight Bachelor

Sir Derek Harold Richard Barton FRS FRSE (8 September 1918 – 16 March 1998) was an English organic chemist and Nobel Prize laureate for 1969.

== Education and early life ==
Barton was born in Gravesend, Kent, to William Thomas and Maude Henrietta Barton (née Lukes).

He attended Gravesend Grammar School (1926–29), The King's School, Rochester (1929–32), Tonbridge School (1932–35) and Medway Technical College (1937–39). In 1938 he entered Imperial College London, where he graduated in 1940 and obtained his PhD degree in Organic Chemistry in 1942.

== Career and research ==
From 1942 to 1944, Barton was a government research chemist, then from 1944 to 1945 he worked for Albright and Wilson in Birmingham. He then became Assistant Lecturer in the Department of Chemistry of Imperial College, and from 1946 to 1949 he was ICI Research Fellow.

During 1949 and 1950, he was a visiting lecturer in natural products chemistry at Harvard University, and was then appointed reader in organic chemistry and, in 1953, professor at Birkbeck College. In 1955, he became Regius Professor of Chemistry at the University of Glasgow, and in 1957, he was appointed professor of organic chemistry at Imperial College, London. In 1950, Barton showed that organic molecules could be assigned a preferred conformation based upon results accumulated by chemical physicists, in particular by Odd Hassel. Using this new technique of conformational analysis, he later determined the geometry of many other natural product molecules.

In 1969, Barton shared the Nobel Prize in Chemistry with Odd Hassel for “contributions to the development of the concept of conformation and its application in chemistry."

In 1958, Barton was appointed Arthur D. Little Visiting Professor of Massachusetts Institute of Technology, and in 1959 Karl Folkers Visiting Professor at the Universities of Illinois and Wisconsin. The same year, he was elected a foreign honorary member of the American Academy of Arts and Sciences.

In 1949, he was the first recipient of the Corday-Morgan Medal and Prize awarded by the Royal Society of Chemistry. In 1954 he was elected a Fellow of the Royal Society and the International Academy of Science, Munich as well as, in 1956, a Fellow of the Royal Society of Edinburgh; in 1965 he was appointed member of the Council for Scientific Policy. He was knighted in 1972, becoming formally styled Sir Derek in Britain. In 1978, he became Director of the Institut de Chimie des Substances Naturelles (ICSN - Gif Sur-Yvette) in France.

In 1977, on the occasion of the centenary of the Royal Institute of Chemistry, the British Post Office honoured him, and 5 other Nobel Prize-winning British chemists, with a series of four postage stamps featuring aspects of their discoveries.

He moved to the United States in 1986 (specifically Texas) and became distinguished professor at Texas A&M University and held this position for 12 years until his death.

In 1996, Barton published a comprehensive volume of his works, entitled Reason and Imagination: Reflections on Research in Organic Chemistry.

As well as for his work on conformation, his name is remembered in a number of reactions in organic chemistry, such as the Barton reaction, the Barton decarboxylation, and the Barton-McCombie deoxygenation.

The newly built Barton Science Centre at Tonbridge School in Kent, where he was educated for 4 years, completed in 2019, is named after him.

== Honours and awards ==
Barton was elected a Fellow of the Royal Society (FRS) in 1954. In 1966 he was elected a Member of the German Academy of Sciences Leopoldina. He was elected to the United States National Academy of Sciences in 1970 and the American Philosophical Society in 1978.

- - Knight Bachelor (1972)
- - Légion d'honneur (1972)

== Personal life ==
Sir Derek married three times: Jeanne Kate Wilkins (on 20 December 1944); Christiane Cognet (died 1992) (in 1969); and Judith Von-Leuenberger Cobb (1939-2012) (in 1993). He had a son by his first marriage.
