= Institut de Chimie des Substances Naturelles =

French research institute

Coordinates: 48.70672°N 2.129378°E

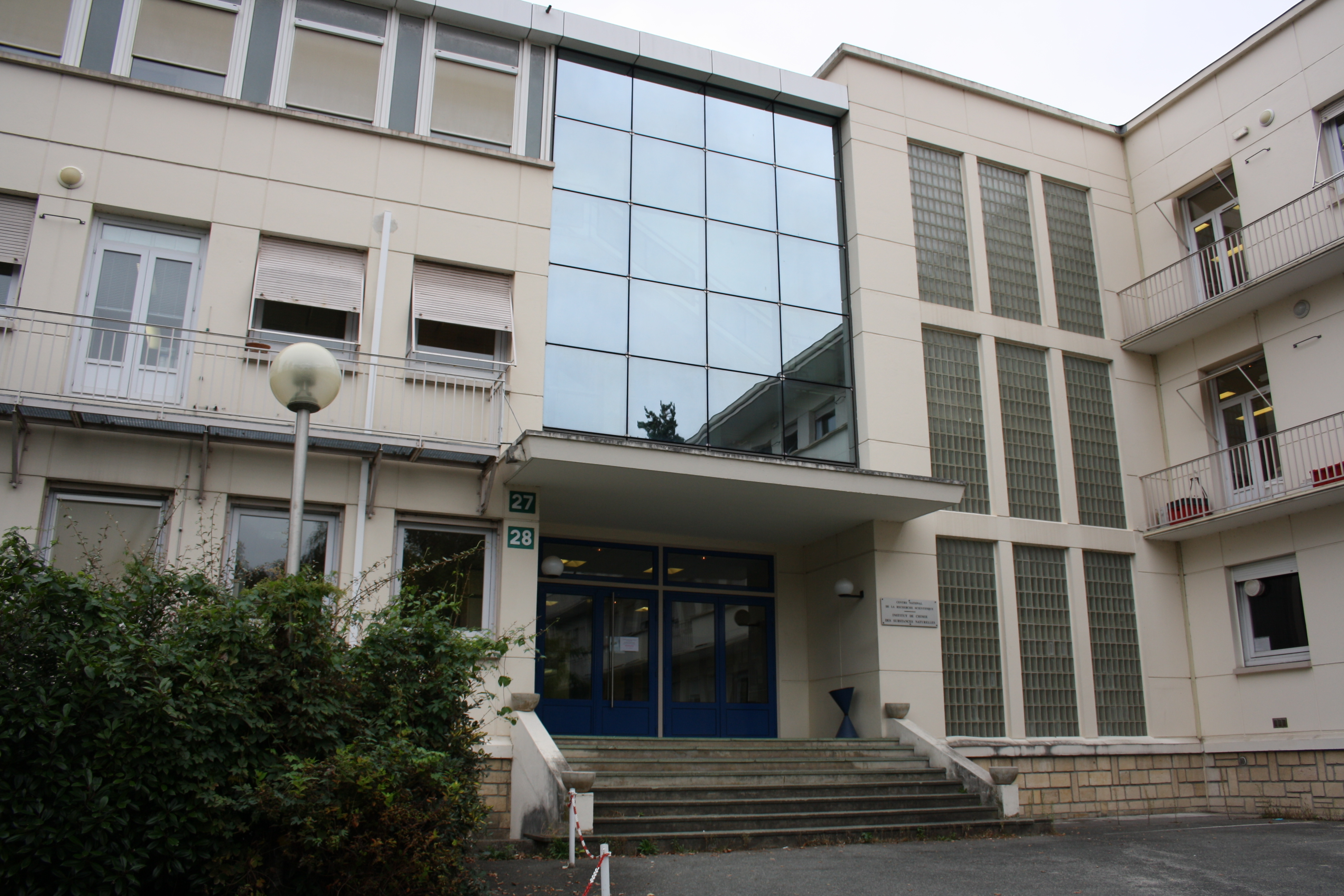
Institut de Chimie des Substances Naturelles in 2011

The Institut de Chimie des Substances Naturelles ("Institute for the chemistry of natural substances"), or ICSN, is part of the Centre national de la recherche scientifique, France's most prominent public research organization.

Located at Gif-sur-Yvette, near Paris, ICSN is France's largest state-run chemistry research institute. Built in 1959, it employs over 300 people and focuses on four research areas:

1. Synthetic and methodological approaches in Organic Chemistry
2. Natural products and medicinal chemistry
3. Structural chemistry and structural biology
4. Chemistry and biology of therapeutic targets
