= Radical (chemistry) =

Atom, molecule, or ion that has an unpaired valence electron; typically highly reactive

Triphenylmethyl, a rare example of a stable organic radical

In chemistry, a radical, also known as a free radical, is an atom, molecule, or ion that has at least one unpaired valence electron. With some exceptions, these unpaired electrons make radicals highly chemically reactive.

Radicals are important in combustion, atmospheric chemistry, polymerization, plasma chemistry, biochemistry, and many other chemical processes.

== Organic radicals ==
=== Bonding and characterization ===
In the terminology of molecular orbital theory, a radical features a singly-occupied molecular orbital (SOMO) at the frontier. In the absence of steric bulk around the atom bearing the SOMO, the SOMO tends to form a bond by dimerization of the radical. Suppressing this tendency–and hence stabilizing the radical–is a major focus of radical chemistry. Both steric and electronic effects may be used to achieve this.

The relative stabilities of tertiary, secondary, primary and methyl radicals can be explained by hyperconjugation.

Organic radicals have one fewer electron than a nucleophilic anion and one more electron than an electrophilic cation. Depending on which species better resembles their ground-state structure, they may exhibit either nucleophilic or electrophilic reactivity. Consequently, organic radicals may be stabilized by either electron-donating and electron-withdrawing groups. The controversial "capto-dative effect" proposes that radicals are best stabilized when both kinds of substituents are present.

The electron-spin resonance technique provides insights into the bonding of radicals. It employs microwave energies to flip the unpaired spin. The energy of the spin flip is usually near g = 2, similar to that of a naked electron, i.e. in organic radicals the odd electron is only slightly affected by its environment. The nuclear magnetic properties of the atom carrying the unpaired spin and its directly bonded neighbors are also manifested in the spectrum.

=== Formation ===
==== Thermolysis ====
Thermolysis refers to generation of radicals by thermally induced fragmentation of labile precursors. Diacyl peroxides degrade by homolysis of the O-O bond to give carboxyl radicals that eliminate carbon dioxide:

(C_{6}H_{5}CO_{2}−O_{2}CC_{6}H_{5} ⇌ 2 C_{6}H_{5}CO_{2}·
C_{6}H_{5}CO_{2}· → C_{6}H_{5}· + CO_{2}

Some diimides lose dinitrogen, releasing a pair of radicals. An example is azobisisobutyronitrile.

==== By redox ====
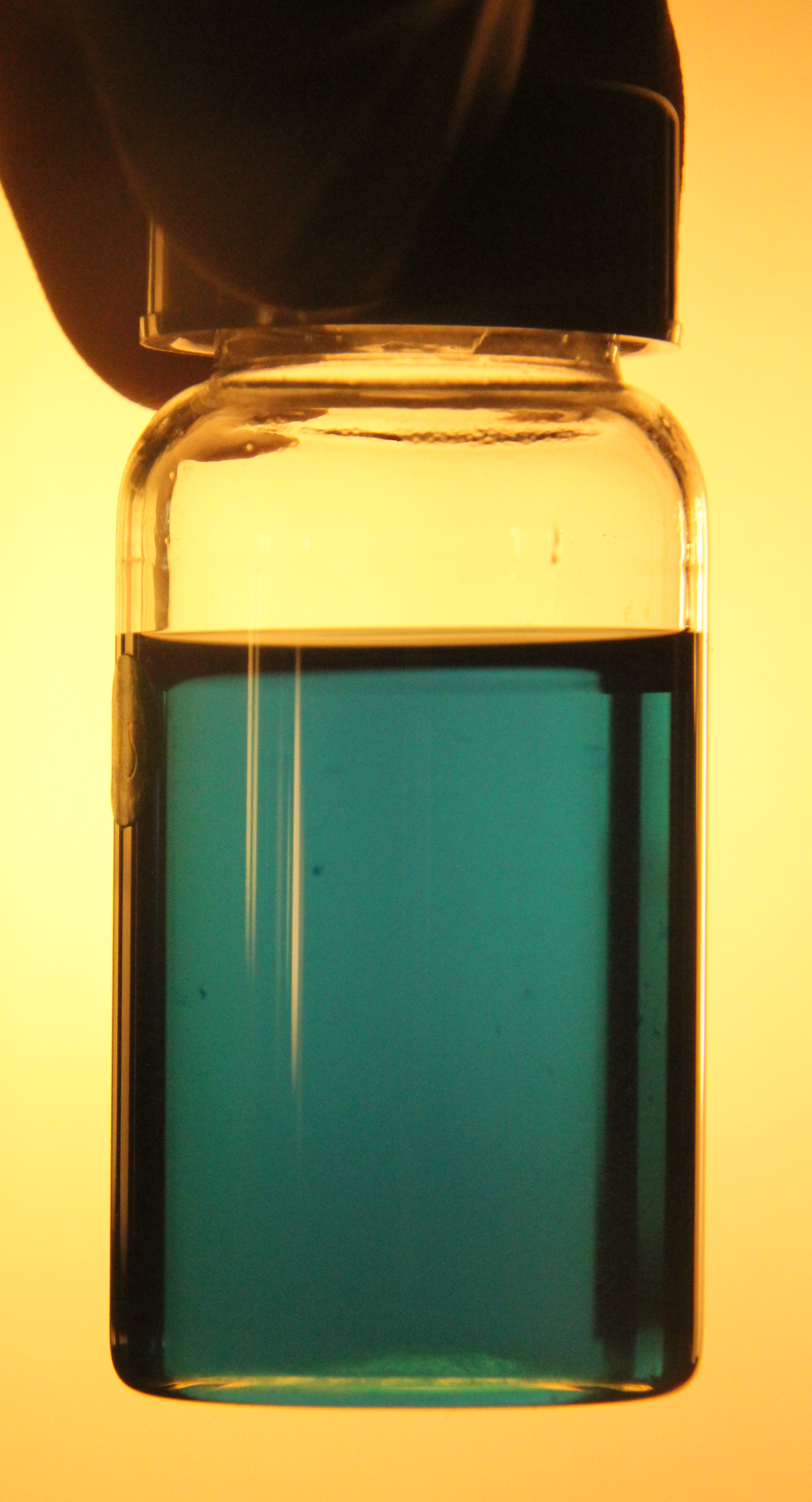
The deep colour of lithium naphthalenide results from the lithium naphthanide radical.

Radical anions form by one-electron redox reactions (reductions) of organic compounds. Although the transformation is simple in concept, few organic compounds reduce at potentials accessible in the laboratory. Stability is conferred on the radical anion when the charge can be delocalized. Examples of observable radical anions are alkali metal naphthalenides, anthracenides, and ketyls.

One-electron oxidation of organic compounds gives radical (S=1/2) derivatives. Like reduction, few organic compounds oxidize at potentials accessible in the laboratory. The formation of radical cations is important in mass spectrometry, which employs high voltages to strip electrons from gaseous samples. On a preparative scale, only organic compounds with multiple electron-donating substituents can be oxidized to give observable salts. Tetrathiafulvalene is one such example.

==== By H-atom abstraction ====
The abstraction of an H atom from organic compounds generates radicals. Although the transformation is conceptually simple, C−H bonds are typically very strong and resist cleavage (hence hydrocarbons' considerable stability). As reflected in bond dissociation energy (BDE) tables, C−H bonds require more than 100 kcal to homolyze. Compounds bearing carbon–hydrogen bonds react with radicals in the order

primary < secondary < tertiary < benzyl < allyl,

reflecting decreasing BDE from left to right. Allylic and benzylic C−H bonds, especially doubly allylic (benzylic) C−H bonds, are weaker and susceptible to H-atom abstraction. As is often cited, the triply allylic C−H bond in triphenylmethyl (trityl) derivatives is particularly weak. Also labile are C−H bonds adjacent to ethers and amines, whose lone pairs of electrons stabilize the resulting carbon-centered radicals by delocalization. The ability of adjacent lone pairs to stabilize radicals is called the α effect. These trends parallel the stability of the resulting radical.

Hydrogen atom abstraction is accelerated when the abstracting agent and product are of opposite reactivities (i.e., one an electrophilic radical and the other nucleophilic).

=== Reactions ===
==== Recombination ====
For most organic radicals in solution, the dominant reaction is simply their dimerization, also called recombination:

2 CH_{3}· → CH_{3}−CH_{3}

Because of the strength of the C-C bond, these reactions are irreversible.

==== Addition to alkenes ====
Radical intermediates in the formation of polymethacrylate (plexiglas or perspex)

Radical addition of a bromine radical to a substituted alkene

In free-radical additions, a radical adds to an alkene. This addition generates a new radical, which can add to yet another alkene, and so on. This behavior underpins radical polymerization, a technology that produces many plastics. When they add to unsaturated substrates, such as alkenes, chain reactions ensue, leading to polymerization. The overall process can usually be divided into three distinct processes. These are initiation, propagation, and termination.

- Initiation reactions are those that result in a net increase in the number of radicals. They may involve the formation of radicals from stable species, or they may involve reactions of radicals with stable species to form more radicals.
- Propagation reactions are those reactions involving radicals in which the total number of radicals remains the same.
- Termination reactions are those reactions resulting in a net decrease in the number of radicals. Typically, two radicals combine to form a more stable species.

==== Other reactions ====
Free radicals engage in many other reactions:

- In radical-nucleophilic aromatic substitution, radicals add to an aryl halide. The halide is displaced at the same time as the addition of an electron. This is a special case of nucleophilic aromatic substitution.
- Intramolecular free radical reactions (substitution or addition) such as the Hofmann–Löffler reaction or the Barton reaction
- Fragmentation reactions include the Norrish reaction and the Hunsdiecker reaction
- Carbon–carbon coupling reactions, such as manganese-mediated coupling reactions.
- Elimination reactions

With regard to rearrangements of radicals, prominent examples are the radical clock reactions, such as the ring-opening of cyclopropylcarbinyl radical. Fragmentations and rearrangements involving radicals are relevant to mass spectrum analysis.

== Combustion ==
Spectrum of the blue flame from a butane torch showing excited molecular radical band emission and Swan bands

Combustion consists of radical chain reactions. Because combustion occurs at high temperatures, a range of radicals are generated that are not observed at room temperature.

Lead deactivates radicals. When gasoline-air mixtures are combusted in the presence of tetraethyl lead, the lead atoms suppress uncontrolled combustion of unburnt residues (engine knocking) or premature ignition (preignition).

== In biology and medicine ==
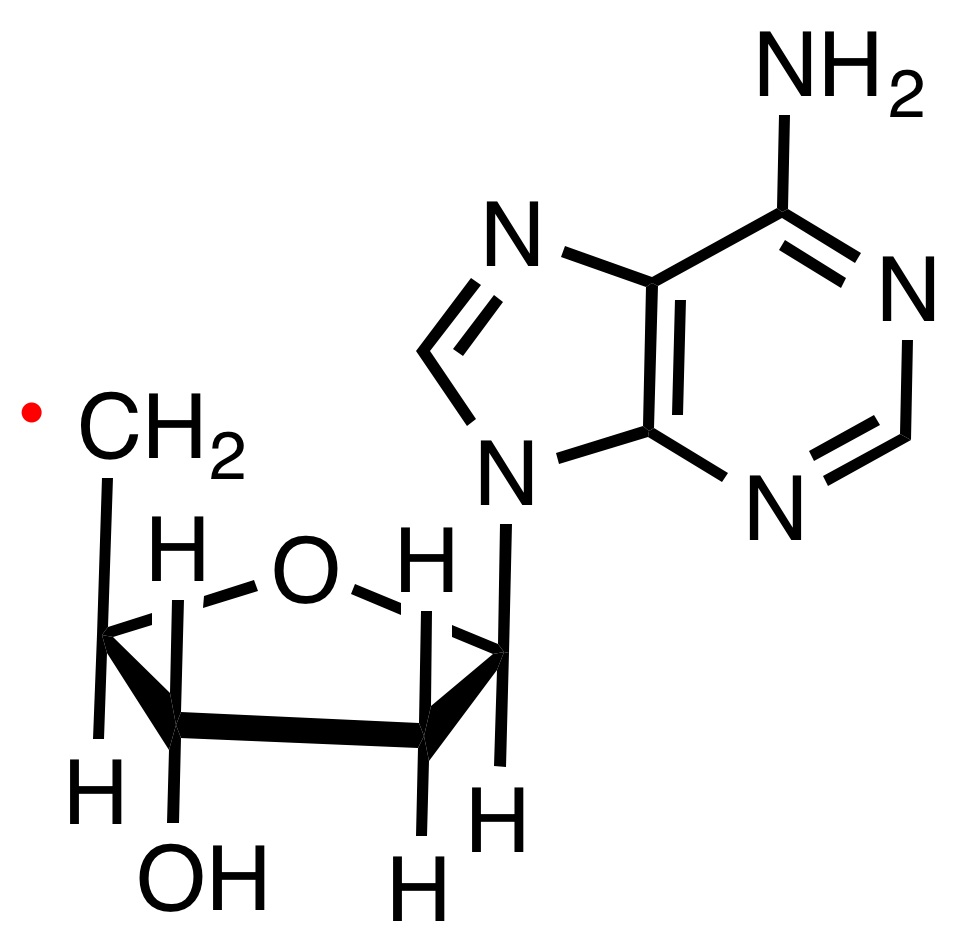
Structure of the deoxyadenosyl radical, a common biosynthetic intermediate

An approximate structure of lignin, which constitutes about 30% of plant matter. It is formed by radical reactions.

Radicals play important roles in biology. Some nitrogen oxides are involved in cell signalling processes, known as redox signaling.

A majority of natural products are generated by radical-generating enzymes. In living organisms, the radicals superoxide and nitric oxide and their reaction products regulate many processes, such as the control of vascular tone (and thus blood pressure). They also play a key role in the intermediary metabolism of various biological compounds. A radical may be trapped within a solvent cage or be otherwise bound.

=== Fats and fatty acids ===
Unsaturated fatty acids and especially polyunsaturated fatty acids and their derived triglycerides have a rich radical chemistry. For example, radical attack of linoleic acid produces a series of 13-hydroxyoctadecadienoic acids and 9-hydroxyoctadecadienoic acids, which appear to regulate inflammatory and/or healing responses, pain perception, and the proliferation of malignant cells. Radical attacks on arachidonic acid and docosahexaenoic acid produce a similar but broader array of signaling products.

=== Disease ===
Radicals may also be involved in Parkinson's disease, senile and drug-induced deafness, and Alzheimer's. The classic free-radical syndrome, the iron-storage disease hemochromatosis, is typically associated with a constellation of free-radical-related symptoms including movement disorder, psychosis, skin pigmentary melanin abnormalities, deafness, arthritis, and diabetes mellitus. The free-radical theory of aging proposes that radicals underlie the aging process. Similarly, the process of mitohormesis suggests that repeated exposure to radicals may extend life span.

Because radicals are necessary for life, the body has a number of mechanisms to minimize radical-induced damage and to repair damage, such as the enzymes superoxide dismutase, catalase, glutathione peroxidase and glutathione reductase. Antioxidants such as vitamins A, C, and E also play a key role in these defense mechanisms. There is good evidence indicating that bilirubin and uric acid can act as antioxidants to help neutralize certain radicals. Bilirubin comes from the breakdown of red blood cells' contents, while uric acid is a breakdown product of purines. Too much bilirubin, though, can lead to jaundice, which could eventually damage the central nervous system, while too much uric acid causes gout. Additionally, polyphenols are theorized to work as antioxidants.

=== Reactive oxygen species ===
Reactive oxygen species (ROS) are species such as superoxide, hydrogen peroxide, and hydroxyl radical, commonly associated with cell damage. ROS form as a natural by-product of the normal metabolism of oxygen and have important roles in cell signaling. Two important oxygen-centered radicals are superoxide and hydroxyl radical. They derive from molecular oxygen under reducing conditions.

Because of their reactivity, these radicals can participate in unwanted side reactions resulting in cell damage. Excessive amounts of these radicals can lead to cell injury and death, which may contribute to many diseases such as cancer, stroke, myocardial infarction, diabetes and major disorders. Many forms of cancer are thought to be the result of reactions between radicals and DNA, potentially resulting in mutations that can adversely affect the cell cycle and potentially lead to malignancy. Some of the symptoms of aging such as atherosclerosis are also attributed to radical induced oxidation of cholesterol to 7-ketocholesterol.

Oxybenzone has been found to form radicals in sunlight, and therefore may be associated with cell damage as well. This only occurred when it was combined with other ingredients commonly found in sunscreens, like titanium oxide and octyl methoxycinnamate.

Reactive oxygen species are also used in controlled reactions involving singlet dioxygen ${}^{1}\mathrm{O}_2$ known as type II photooxygenation reactions after Dexter energy transfer (triplet-triplet annihilation) from natural triplet dioxygen ${}^{3}\mathrm{O}_2$ and triplet excited state of a photosensitizer. Typical chemical transformations with this singlet dioxygen species involve, among others, conversion of cellulosic biowaste into new poylmethine dyes.

== Inorganic, main group, and related non-carbon radicals ==
Radicals consisting of main group elements are more common than for organic radicals. Radicals is especially common for the compounds rich in most electronegative atoms, N, O, and the halogens. The N- and O-based radicals are described below as well as under the topics of atmospheric chemistry.

Some main-group radicals exist in notional equilibrium with closed-shell dimers. For example, nitrogen dioxide equilibrates with dinitrogen tetroxide, and tributyltin radicals equilibrate with hexabutyldistannane.

=== Hydrogen radical ===
The H-H bond is one of the strongest chemical (single) bonds. Splitting H_{2} into 2 H^{•} requires a ΔH ° of +435 kJ/mol. By contrast splitting, Cl_{2} into two Cl^{•} requires only +243 kJ/mol. H* is abundant in the universe. Its existence is owed to its dilute nature, which precludes the thermodynamically favorable dimerization.

=== Oxygen-based radicals ===
The radical derived from α-tocopherol

A source of biologically important radicals are compounds containing the hydroxyl group. Illustrative is α-tocopherol (vitamin E). The tocopherol radical itself is insufficiently stable for isolation, but the parent molecule is a highly effective hydrogen-atom donor.

The O–O bond is often weak and compounds containing this moiety fragment to give oxygen-based radicals. Dibenzoyl peroxide readily forms a pair benzoyloxy radicals, which acts as an initiator for many radical reactions.

Radical abstraction between a benzoyloxy radical and hydrogen bromide

Water-derived radicals are rarely observed but are significant because of Earth's aqueous environments.

Lewis dot structure of a hydroxide ion compared to a hydroxyl radical

Dioxygen (O_{2}) is an important example of a stable diradical. Singlet oxygen, where the electrons are paired, is less stable. One-electron reduction of dioxygen gives superoxide, O_{2}^{-}, which is a conventional radical. The salt potassium superoxide is commercially available.

=== Nitrogen-based radicals ===
Within nitrogen-based radicals, a major example is nitric oxide (NO). Another example is the anion in Fremy's salt (Potassium nitrosodisulfonate, (KSO_{3})_{2}NO). Many thiazyl radicals are known.

=== Halogen radicals ===
Like O_{2} and NO_{x}, halogens are electronegative and prone to form radicals. The X-X bonds are relatively weak. Thus, chlorine and methane react in the presence of light to give chloromethanes. Free radical chlorination is used for the industrial production of some chlorinated solvents. The conversion commences with splitting of Cl2 to give atomic chlorine, which is a radical:

Cl_{2} → 2Cl·
CH_{4} + Cl· → CH_{3}· + HCl
CH_{3}· + Cl_{2} → CH_{3}Cl + Cl·

Related free-radical substitutions are known. for instance free-radical halogenation.

=== TEMPO ===
2,2,6,6-Tetramethylpiperidinyloxyl is a robust radical.

Several factors that stabilize radicals are illustrated by the 2,2,6,6-tetramethylpiperidinyloxyl (TEMPO), a commercially available red crystalline compound. The radical is delocalized over the N-O bond. The four methyl substituents shield the N-hydroxypiperidinyl core radical. The vicinal nitrogen and oxygen lone pairs weaken any bonds that might form to oxygen, keeping the radical stabilized. Consequently, TEMPO behaves, aside from its paramagnetism, like a normal organic compound.

=== Metal ions ===
Many metal salts are paramagnetic because many metal ions have unpaired electrons. Commonly encountered examples are all salts of ferric and cupric ions and almost all lanthanide ions. Although they have unpaired electrons, paramagnetic metal complexes are often not discussed as free radicals. The presence of unpaired electrons in these complexes is manifested in their magnetic properties such as their use in magnetic resonance imaging.

== Atmospheric radicals ==
The most common radical in the lower atmosphere is molecular dioxygen.

Photodissociation of molecules can produce radicals. In the lower atmosphere, important radicals are produced by the photodissociation of nitrogen dioxide to an oxygen atom and nitric oxide, which plays a key role in smog formation—and the photodissociation of ozone to give the excited oxygen atom O(1D). The net and return reactions are also shown.

$$\ce{NO2 ->[h \nu] NO + O}$$
$$\ce{O + O2 -> O3}$$
$$\ce{NO2 + O2 ->[h \nu] NO + O3}$$
$$\ce{NO + O3 -> NO2 + O2}$$

In the upper atmosphere, the photodissociation of normally unreactive chlorofluorocarbons by solar ultraviolet radiation is an important source of radicals. These reactions give the chlorine radical, Cl^{•}, which catalyzes the conversion of ozone to O_{2}, thus facilitating ozone depletion.

$$\ce{CF3Cl ->[h \nu] Cl^\bullet {}+ CF3^\bullet}$$
$$\ce{Cl^\bullet {}+ O3 -> ClO^\bullet {}+ O2}$$
$$\ce{O3 ->[h \nu] O + O2}$$
$$\ce{O {}+ ClO^\bullet -> Cl^\bullet {}+ O2}$$
$$\ce{2O3 ->[h \nu] 3O2}$$

Such reactions cause the depletion of the ozone layer, especially since the chlorine radical is free to engage in another reaction chain; consequently, the use of chlorofluorocarbons as refrigerants has been restricted.

== History and nomenclature ==
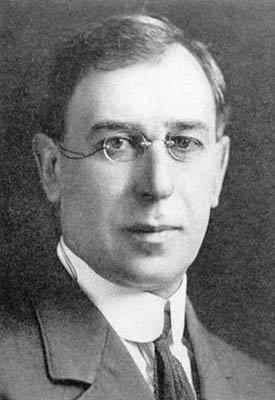
Moses Gomberg (1866–1947), the founder of radical chemistry

Until late in the 20th century the word "radical" was used in chemistry to indicate any connected group of atoms, such as a methyl group or a carboxyl, whether it was part of a larger molecule or a molecule on its own. A radical is often known as an R group. The qualifier "free" was then needed to specify the unbound case. Following recent nomenclature revisions, a part of a larger molecule is now called a functional group or substituent, and "radical" now implies "free". However, the old nomenclature may still appear in some books.

The term radical was already in use when the now obsolete radical theory was developed. Louis-Bernard Guyton de Morveau introduced the phrase "radical" in 1785 and the phrase was employed by French chemist Antoine Lavoisier in 1789 in his Traité Élémentaire de Chimie. A radical was then identified as the substituent of certain acids (the Latin word "radix" meaning "root"). Historically, the term radical in radical theory was also used for bound parts of the molecule, especially when they remain unchanged in reactions. These are now called functional groups. For example, methyl alcohol was described as consisting of a methyl "radical" and a hydroxyl "radical". Neither are radicals in the modern chemical sense, as they are permanently bound to each other, and have no unpaired, reactive electrons; however, they can be observed as radicals in mass spectrometry when broken apart by irradiation with energetic electrons.

Pioneering studies into free radical reactions include the discovery of the triphenylmethyl radical by American chemist Moses Gomberg in 1900. The lead-mirror experiment described by British chemist Friedrich Paneth in 1927 reinforced their existence. In this last experiment tetramethyllead is decomposed at elevated temperatures to methyl radicals and elemental lead in a quartz tube. The gaseous methyl radicals migrate to another part of the chamber in a carrier gas where they react with lead in a mirror film, which slowly disappears. In 1933, American chemists Morris S. Kharasch and Frank Mayo proposed that free radicals were responsible for anti-Markovnikov addition of hydrogen bromide to allyl bromide.

In most fields of chemistry, the historical definition of radicals contends that the molecules have nonzero electron spin. However, in fields including spectroscopy and astrochemistry, the definition is slightly different. German-Canadian physicist Gerhard Herzberg, who won the Nobel prize for his research into the electron structure and geometry of radicals, suggested a looser definition of free radicals: "any transient (chemically unstable) species (atom, molecule, or ion)". The main point of his suggestion is that there are many chemically unstable molecules that have zero spin, such as C_{2}, C_{3}, CH_{2} and so on. This definition is more convenient for discussions of transient chemical processes and astrochemistry; therefore, researchers in these fields prefer to use this loose definition.

== Depiction in chemical reactions ==
Homolysis of a bromine molecule producing two bromine radicals

In chemical equations, radicals are frequently denoted by a dot placed immediately to the right of the atomic symbol. Radical reaction mechanisms use single-headed arrows to depict the movement of single electrons. The homolytic cleavage of the breaking bond is sometimes drawn with a "fish-hook" arrow.

Example of an arrow-pushing mechanism for an internal radical reaction
