= Free-radical halogenation =

Chemical reaction

In organic chemistry, free-radical halogenation is a type of halogenation. This chemical reaction is typical of alkanes and alkyl-substituted aromatics under application of UV light. The reaction is used for the industrial synthesis of chloroform (CHCl_{3}), dichloromethane (CH_{2}Cl_{2}), and hexachlorobutadiene. It proceeds by a free-radical chain mechanism.

== General mechanism ==
The chain mechanism is as follows, using the chlorination of methane as an example:

Initiation
Ultraviolet radiation splits (homolyzes) a chlorine molecule to two chlorine atom radicals.

Methane chlorination: initiation

Chain propagation (two steps)
A radical abstracts a hydrogen atom from methane, leaving a primary methyl radical. The methyl radical then abstracts Cl^{•} from Cl_{2} to give the desired product and another chlorine radical.

Methane chlorination: propagation

The radical will then participate in another propagation reaction: the radical chain. Other products such as CH_{2}Cl_{2} may also form.
Chain termination
Two free radicals (chlorine and chlorine, chlorine and methyl, or methyl and methyl) combine:

Methane chlorination: termination

The last possibility generates in an impurity in the final mixture (notably, an organic molecule with a longer carbon chain than the reactants).

The net reaction is:

Methane chlorination overall reaction

The steady-state approximation implies that this process has rate law k[CH_{4}][Cl_{2}]^{1/2}.

As a radical reaction, the process is halted or severely slowed by radical traps, such as oxygen.

== Control ==
The relative rates at which different halogens react vary considerably:

fluorine (108) > chlorine (1) > bromine (7×10^{−11}) > iodine (2×10^{−22}).

Radical fluorination with the pure element is difficult to control and highly exothermic; care must be taken to prevent an explosion or a runaway reaction. With chlorine the reaction is moderate to fast; with bromine, slow and requires intense UV irradiation; and with iodine, it is practically nonexistent and thermodynamically unfavored. However, radical iodination can be completed with other iodine sources (see § Variants).

The different rates are often a pedagogical demonstration of the reactivity–selectivity principle and the Hammond postulate. A bromine radical is not very reactive and the transition state for hydrogen abstraction has much radical character and is reached late. The reactive chlorine radical develops a transition state resembling the reactant with little radical character. When the alkyl radical is fully formed in the transition state, it can benefit fully from any resonance stabilization present thereby maximizing selectivity.

Bond dissociation energies strongly influence any radical process and in a few unusual cases, free-radical halogenation can regioselect. Phenylic hydrogens have extremely strong bonds and are rarely displaced by halogens. Non-enolizable aldehydes oxidize to the acyl halide, but enolizable aldehydes typically halogenate at the α position instead. Indeed, allylic and benzylic hydrogens have bonds much weaker than alkanes, and are selectively replaced in the Wohl-Ziegler reaction. Generally, N-haloamines in sulfuric acid (but not other haloradical sources) halogenate alkane chains at penultimate carbons (e.g. pentane to 2-halopentane), chains terminating in only carboxylic acids at the center, and bridged compounds at the bridgehead. As of 2020, the reasons for the latter N-haloimide selectivities remained unclear.

Aside from those few exceptions, free-radical halogenation is notoriously unselective. Chlorination rarely stops at monosubstitution: depending on reaction conditions, methane chlorination yields varying proportions of chloromethane, dichloromethane, chloroform and carbon tetrachloride.

For asymmetric substrates, the reaction produces all possible isomers, but not equally. Radical halogenations are generally indifferent amongst equi-substituted potential radicals and effect a so-called statistical product distribution. Butane (CH_{3}−CH_{2}−CH_{2}−CH_{3}), for example, can be chlorinated at the "1" position to give 1-chlorobutane (CH_{3}−CH_{2}−CH_{2}−CH_{2}Cl) or at the "2" position to give 2-chlorobutane (CH_{3}−CH_{2}−CHCl−CH_{3}). The latter occurs faster, and is the major product.

The experimental relative chlorination rates at primary, secondary, and tertiary positions match the corresponding radical species' stability:

tertiary (5) > secondary (3.8) > primary (1).

(N.b.: these values vary with solvent.) Thus any single chlorination step slightly favors substitution at the carbon already most substituted. The rates are generally constant across reactions and predict product distributions with relatively high accuracy. For example, 2-methyl butane ((CH_{3})_{2}CHCH_{2}CH_{3}) exhibits the following results:

Moiety	Type	# Hydrogens		Relative rate		Quantity	Proportion
2CH_{3}	Primary	6	×	1	=	6	28%
CH	Tertiary	1	×	5	=	5	23%
CH_{2}	Secondary	2	×	3.8	=	7.6	35%
CH_{3}	Primary	3	×	1	=	3	14%
Total						21.6	100%

Note that the sole tertiary hydrogen is nearly as likely to chlorinate as the 6 hydrogens terminating the branches, despite their much greater abundance.

== Variations ==
Many mixtures of radical initiators, oxidants, and halogen compounds can generate the necessary halogen radicals. For example, consider radical bromination of toluene:

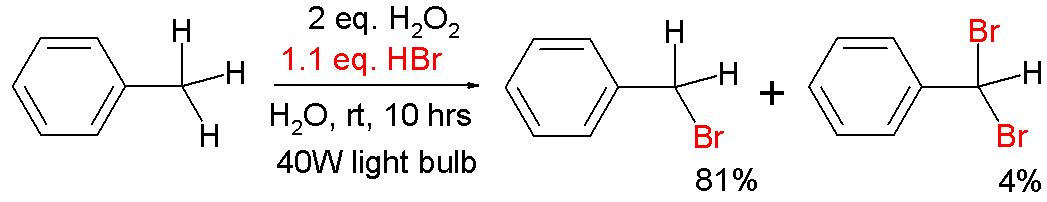
bromination of toluene with hydrobromic acid and hydrogen peroxide in water

This reaction takes place on water instead of an organic solvent and the bromine is obtained from oxidation of hydrobromic acid with hydrogen peroxide. An incandescent light bulb suffices to radicalize.

Other sources include alkyl hypohalites or single-electron oxidation-capable transition metals. In particular, tert-butyl hypoiodite is a common iodine source for radical iodination.
