= Charles Blachford Mansfield =

British chemist and author (1819–1855)

Charles Blachford Mansfield (8 May 1819 – 26 February 1855) was a British chemist and author.

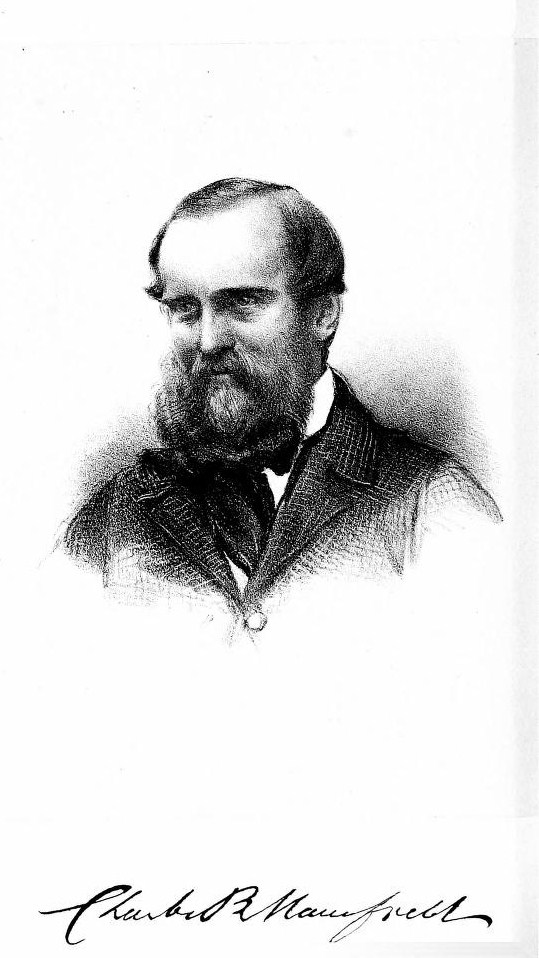
Charles Blachford Mansfield

== Early life ==
He was born on 8 May 1819 at Rowner, Hampshire, where his father, John Mansfield, was rector; his mother was Winifred, eldest daughter of Robert Pope Blachford of Osborne House, Isle of Wight. He was educated first at a private school at Twyford, Hampshire, and then at Winchester College. At age his health broke down, and he passed a year with a private tutor in the country. On 23 November 1836 he entered his name at Clare Hall, Cambridge, but did not begin residence till October. With too frequent absences from ill-health, he did not graduate B.A. till 1846 (M.A. 1849).

Mansfield was once a hunter who killed a seal but developed a sensitive conscience and developed the notion that it was wrong to take away the life of any animal. He stated that the seal he had killed "appeared to him in his dreams, and stood by his bed, bleeding, and making him wretched." Mansfield became a vegetarian and lived on a diet of bread, dates and lentils and gave his savings to the poor.

== Chemist ==
Mansfield read widely, and gathered friends round him: with Charles Kingsley, a contemporary at Cambridge, he formed a lifelong friendship. While still at Cambridge he attended medical classes at St. George's Hospital; but when he settled in London in 1846 he concentrated on chemistry. In 1848, after completing a course at the Royal College of Chemistry, he undertook, at August Wilhelm Hofmann's request, a series of experiments leading to the extraction of benzole from coal-tar, important for the dye industry. He patented his inventions, but others reaped the profits.

In the Chartist crisis of 1848-9 Mansfield joined Frederick Denison Maurice, Kingsley, and others in their efforts at social reform among the workmen of London; and in the cholera year helped to provide pure water for districts like Bermondsey, where every drop was sewage-tainted. In the winter of 1851–1852, he delivered at the Royal Institution a course of lectures on the chemistry of the metals, with an attempted classification.

== Visit to Paraguay ==
In summer 1852 Mansfield started for Paraguay. He arrived at Buenos Ayres in August, and having obtained permission from Justo José de Urquiza to go up the Paraná River, he reached Asunción on 24 November, and remained there two and a half months. Paraguay, under José Gaspar Rodríguez de Francia and his successor Carlos Antonio López, had been closed to the world outside for 40 years, and Mansfield was, if not the first English visitor to the capital, certainly the first to go there simply to investigate.

== Last years ==
Mansfield returned to England in the spring of 1853, and resumed his chemical studies. He had been invited to send specimens of benzole to the Paris Exhibition of 1855, and on 17 February 1855, while he was preparing these in a room which he had hired for the purpose in St. John's Wood, a naphtha still overflowed, and Mansfield was so injured that nine days later he died in Middlesex Hospital, at age 35.

== Works ==
Benzol, its Nature and Utility (1849) was a pamphlet. Mansfield's major work in chemistry was the Theory of Salts, completed in 1855. In September 1850 a balloon machine constructed at Paris led to his Aerial Navigation.

Mansfield wrote several papers in Politics for the People, edited by Maurice and John Malcolm Forbes Ludlow, and then in the Christian Socialist. His letters from South America, published as Paraguay, Brazil and the Plate (1856) by Kingsley, contain descriptions of Paraguayan society, scenery, plant and bird life, and a scheme for the colonisation of the Gran Chaco; a sketch of the history of Paraguay formed the concluding chapter of the volume. His earlier letters, printed in the same volume, deal in a similar manner with Brazil. These were translated into Portuguese by Antonio Diodoro de Pascual, and published along with critical essays on Mansfield's narrative at Rio Janeiro (1861–2).

== Notes ==
Attribution

This article incorporates text from a publication now in the public domain: Cramb, John Adam (1893). "Mansfield, Charles Blachford". In Lee, Sidney (ed.). Dictionary of National Biography. Vol. 36. London: Smith, Elder & Co.
