= Reactivity–selectivity principle =

Obsolete concept in chemistry

In chemistry, the reactivity–selectivity principle or RSP states that a more reactive chemical compound or reactive intermediate is less selective in chemical reactions. In this context selectivity represents the ratio of reaction rates.

This principle was generally accepted until the 1970s when too many exceptions started to appear. The principle is now considered obsolete.

A classic example of perceived RSP found in older organic chemistry textbooks concerns the free radical halogenation of simple alkanes. Whereas the relatively unreactive bromine reacts with 2-methylbutane predominantly to 2-bromo-2-methylbutane, the reaction with much more reactive chlorine results in a mixture of all four regioisomers.

Another example of RSP can be found in the selectivity of the reaction of certain carbocations with azides and water. The very stable triphenylmethyl carbocation derived from solvolysis of the corresponding triphenylmethyl chloride reacts 100 times faster with the azide anion than with water. When the carbocation is the very reactive tertiary adamantane carbocation (as judged from diminished rate of solvolysis) this difference is only a factor of 10.

Constant or inverse relationships are just as frequent. For example, a group of 3- and 4-substituted pyridines in their reactivity quantified by their pKa show the same selectivity in their reactions with a group of alkylating reagents.

The reason for the early success of RSP was that the experiments involved very reactive intermediates with reactivities close to kinetic diffusion control and as a result the more reactive intermediate appeared to react slower with the faster substrate.

General relationships between reactivity and selectivity in chemical reactions can successfully be explained by Hammond's postulate.

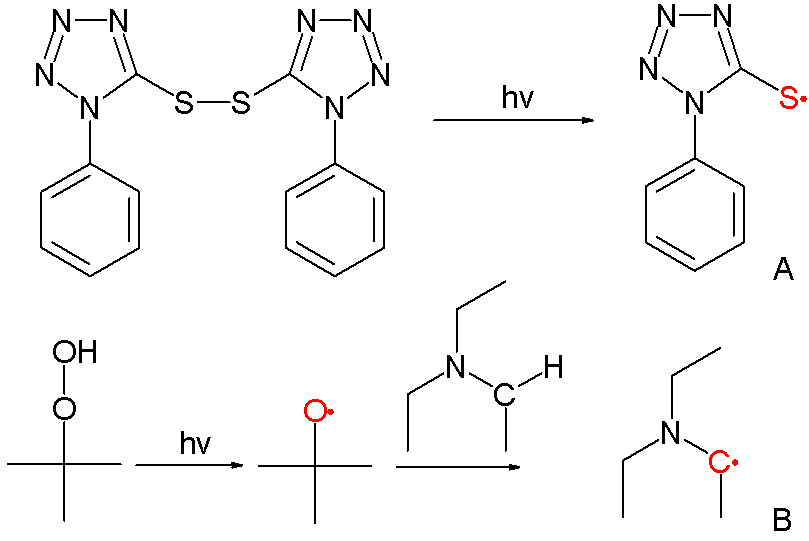
Sulfur tetrazole radical derived from photolysis of disulfide and carbon radical derived from photolysis of t-butyl peroxide followed by proton abstraction from triethylamine

When reactivity-selectivity relationships do exist they signify different reaction modes. In one study the reactivity of two different free radical species (A, sulfur, B carbon) towards addition to simple alkenes such as acrylonitrile, vinyl acetate and acrylamide was examined.

The sulfur radical was found to be more reactive (6*10^{8} vs. 1*10^{7} M^{−1}.s^{−1}) and less selective (selectivity ratio 76 vs 1200) than the carbon radical. In this case, the effect can be explained by extending the Bell–Evans–Polanyi principle with a factor $\delta \,$ accounting for transfer of charge from the reactants to the transition state of the reaction which can be calculated in silico:

$E_a = E_o + \alpha \Delta H_r + \beta \delta^2\,$

with $E_a\,$ the activation energy and $\Delta H_r\,$ the reaction enthalpy change. With the electrophilic sulfur radical the charge transfer is largest with electron-rich alkenes such as acrylonitrile but the resulting reduction in activation energy (β is negative) is offset by a reduced enthalpy. With the nucleophilic carbon radical on the other hand both enthalpy and polar effects have the same direction thus extending the activation energy range.
