= August Wilhelm von Hofmann =

German chemist (1818–1892)

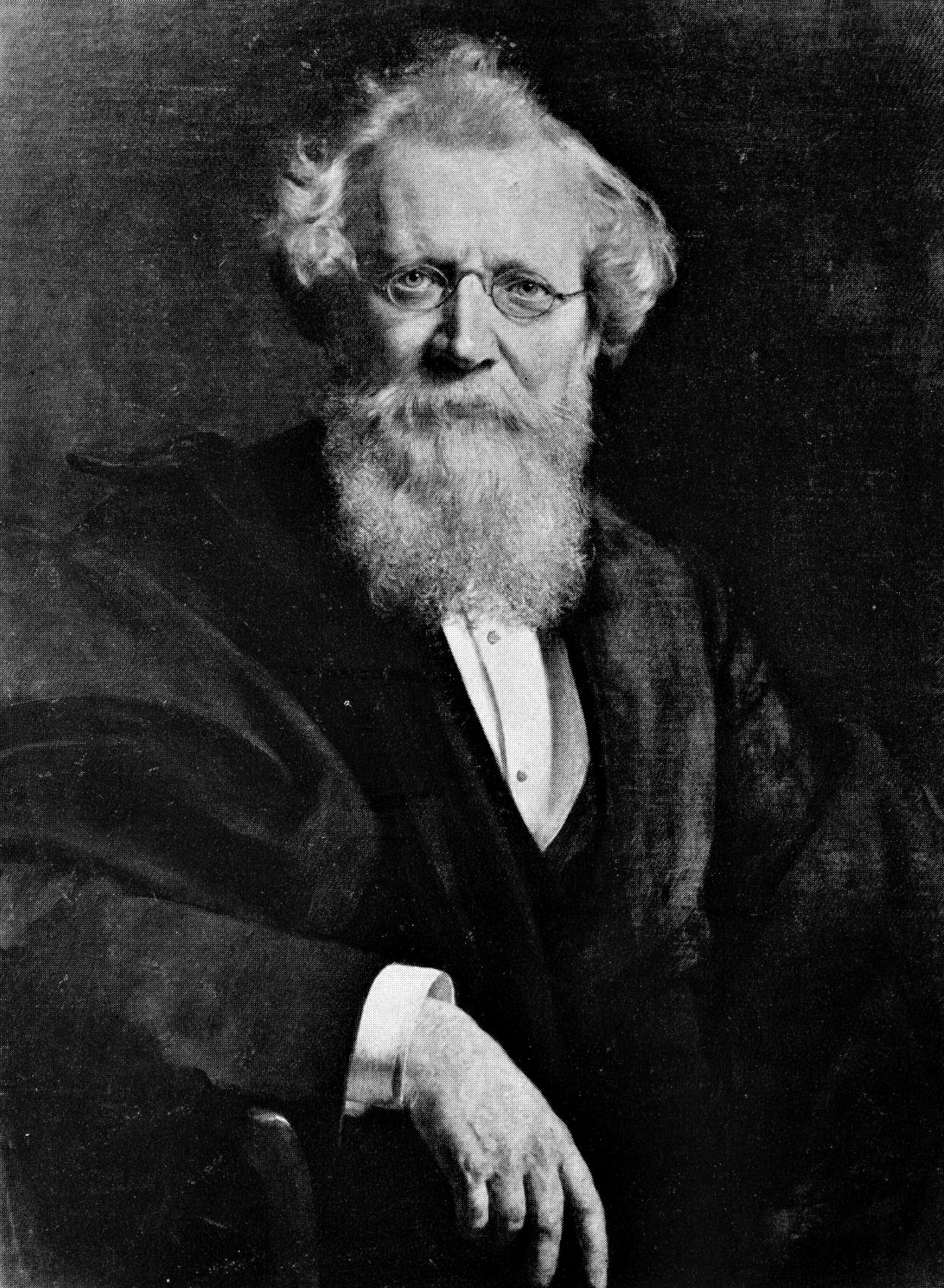
- Born: 8 April 1818; Giessen, Grand Duchy of Hesse
- Died: 5 May 1892 (aged 74); Berlin, German Empire
- Education: University of Giessen
- Known for: Hofmann rearrangement; Hofmann elimination; Hofmann voltameter; Hofmann–Löffler reaction; Hofmann–Martius rearrangement; Ball-and-stick model
- Spouses: Helene Moldenhauer (1846); Rosamond Wilson (1856); Elise Moldenhauer (1866); Bertha Tiemann (1873)
- Awards: Royal Medal (1854); Copley Medal (1875); Faraday Lectureship Prize (1875); Albert Medal (1881)
- Scientific career
- Fields: Organic chemistry
- Workplaces: University of Bonn; Royal College of Chemistry; Imperial College London; Berlin University
- Doctoral advisor: Justus von Liebig
- Doctoral students: Richard Abegg; Eugen Bamberger; Lazăr Edeleanu; Fritz Haber; Rudolf Hugo Nietzki; Adolf Pinner; Ferdinand Tiemann; Karl Friedrich von Auwers; Max Le Blanc

August Wilhelm von Hofmann (8 April 1818 – 5 May 1892) was a German chemist who made considerable contributions to organic chemistry. His research on aniline helped lay the basis of the aniline-dye industry, and his research on coal tar laid the groundwork for his student Charles Mansfield's practical methods for extracting benzene and toluene and converting them into nitro compounds and amines. Hofmann's discoveries include formaldehyde, hydrazobenzene, the isonitriles, and allyl alcohol. He prepared three ethylamines and tetraethylammonium compounds and established their structural relationship to ammonia.

After studying under Justus von Liebig at the University of Giessen, Hofmann became the first director of the Royal College of Chemistry, now part of Imperial College London, in 1845. In 1865 he returned to Germany to accept a position at the University of Berlin as a teacher and researcher. After his return he co-founded the German Chemical Society (Deutsche Chemische Gesellschaft) (1867). In both London and Berlin, Hofmann recreated the style of laboratory instruction established by Liebig at Giessen, fostering a school of chemistry focused on experimental organic chemistry and its industrial applications.

Hofmann received several significant awards in the field of chemistry, including the Royal Medal (1854), the Copley Medal (1875) and the Albert Medal (1881). He was elected as a member of the American Philosophical Society in 1862. He was ennobled on his seventieth birthday. His name is associated with the Hofmann voltameter, the Hofmann rearrangement, the Hofmann–Martius rearrangement, Hofmann elimination, and the Hofmann–Löffler reaction.

== Early life and education ==
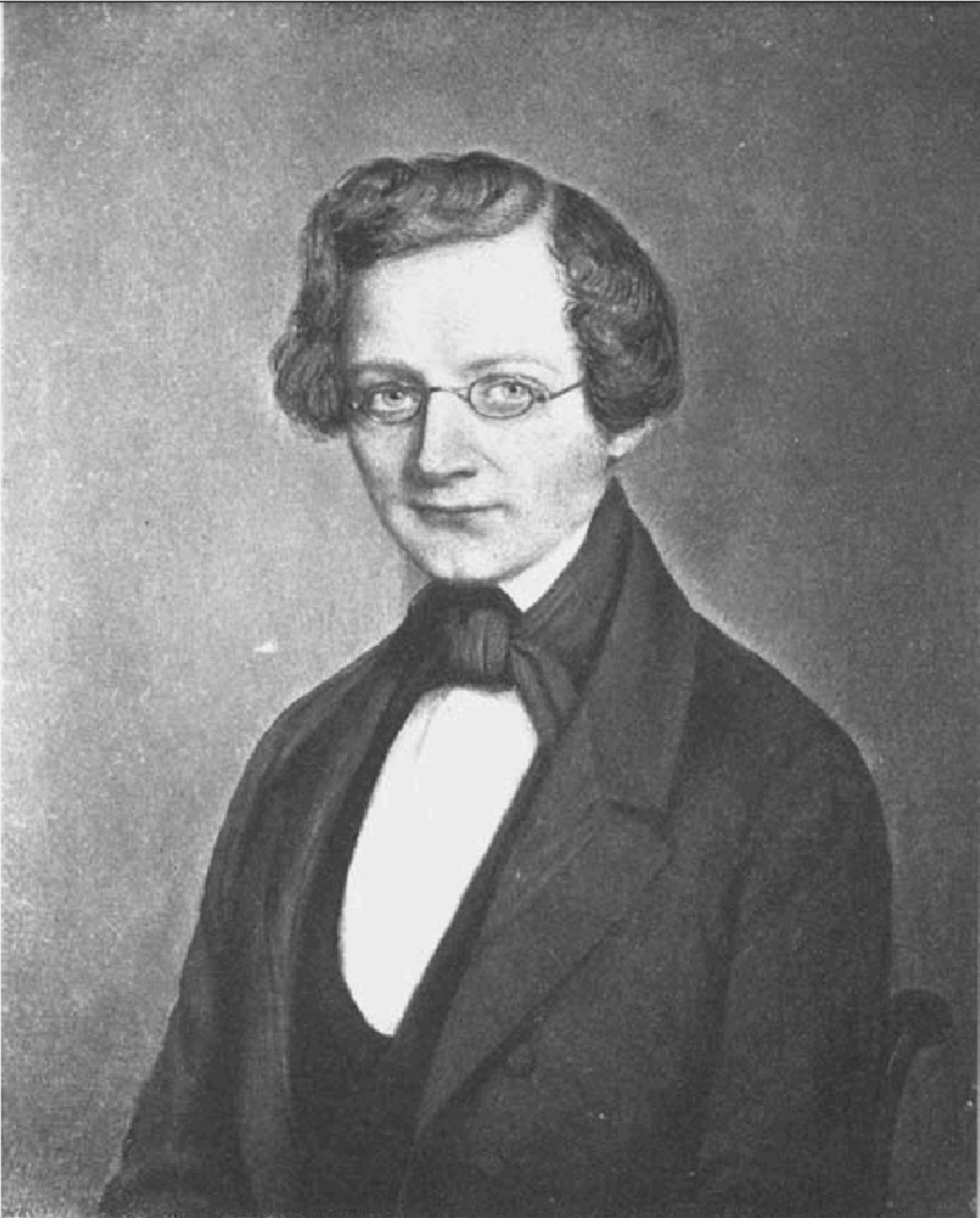
Hofmann, 1846

August Wilhelm Hofmann was born at Giessen, Grand Duchy of Hesse, on 8 April 1818. He was the son of Johann Philipp Hofmann, privy councillor and provincial architect to the court at Darmstadt. As a young man, he travelled widely with his father. August Wilhelm matriculated at the University of Giessen in 1836.

He originally took up the study of law and philology at Giessen. He may have become interested in chemistry when his father enlarged Liebig's Giessen laboratories in 1839. August Wilhelm changed his studies to chemistry, and studied under Justus von Liebig. He obtained his PhD there in 1841. In 1843, after his father's death, he became one of Liebig's assistants.

His association with Liebig eventually became personal as well as professional. Both his first wife, Helene Moldenhauer (m. 12 August 1846), and his third wife, Elise Moldenhauer (m. 19 May 1866), were nieces of Liebig's wife, Henriette Moldenhauer. Hofmann reportedly courted Elise after Liebig's daughter Johanna refused him. In between, he married Rosamond Wilson (m. 13 December 1856), and later Bertha Tiemann (m. 11 August 1873) He had eleven children.

== Career ==
=== Royal College of Chemistry in London ===
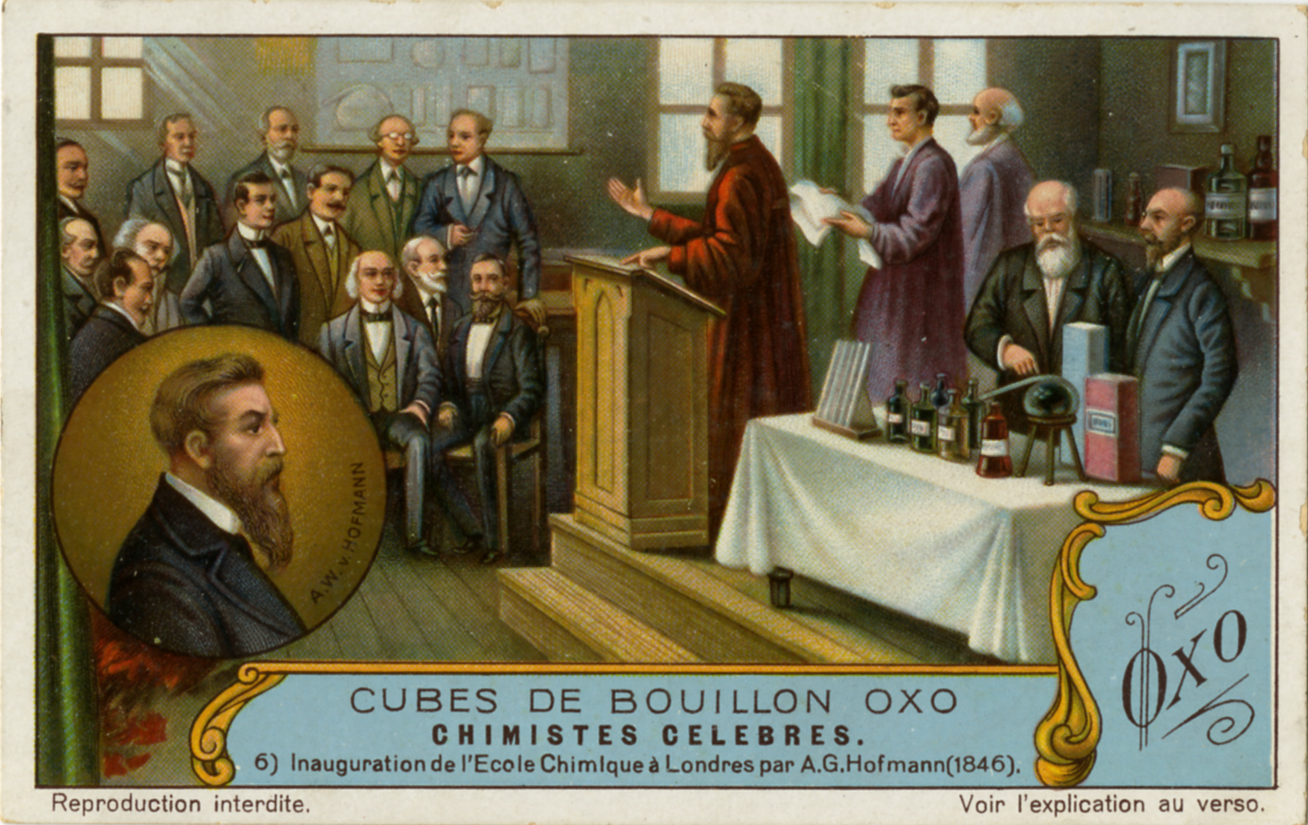
Hofmann at the Inauguration of the School of Chemistry in London. Chimistes Celebres, Liebig's Extract of Meat Company Trading Card, 1929

As president of the Royal Society in London, Albert, Prince Consort to Queen Victoria, was determined to foster scientific advancement in Britain. In 1845, he proposed to start a school of practical chemistry in London, under the style of the Royal College of Chemistry. Liebig was approached for advice, and recommended Hofmann to the directorship of the new institution. Hofmann and the Prince met when Prince Albert, on a visit to his alma mater at Bonn, found his old rooms now occupied by Hofmann and his chemical apparatus. In 1845 Hofmann was approached by Sir James Clark, physician to Queen Victoria with the offer of the directorship. With the support of Prince Albert, and funding from a variety of private sources, the institution opened in 1845 with Hofmann as its first director.

The financial position of the new institution was somewhat precarious. Hofmann accepted the position on the condition that he be appointed as extraordinary professor at Bonn, with leave of absence for two years, so that he could resume his career in Germany if the English appointment did not go well. The college opened in 1845 with 26 students at 16 Hanover Square, moving to cheaper premises at 299 Oxford Street in 1848. Hofmann himself relinquished his free personal accommodation in Hanover Square and gave up part of his salary. Despite this rocky start, the institution became successful for a time, and was an international leader in the development of aniline dyes. Many of the men who studied there made significant contributions to chemical history.

In 1853, the Royal College of Chemistry became part of the governmental Department of Science and Art, under the new School of Mines, putting it in a position to receive governmental funding on a somewhat more secure basis. However, with the death of Prince Albert in 1861, the institution lost one of its most significant supporters. Hofmann felt the loss deeply, writing in 1863, "[Albert's] early kindness exercised so powerful an influence upon the destinies of my existence. Year by year do I feel more deeply the debt of gratitude which I owe to him... it is to him, I feel, that I owe my opportunities through life." Without the Prince's encouragement, British government and industry lost interest in science and technology. Hofmann's decision to return to Germany can be seen as a symptom of that decline, and with him gone, the Royal College of Chemistry lost its focus. Later, the Royal College of Chemistry, under the School of Mines, became part of Imperial College London as part of a drive to stop Britain falling behind Germany in science and technology.

=== Berlin University ===
In 1864 Hofmann was offered a chair of chemistry at the University of Bonn, and another at the University of Berlin. While taking his time to decide which offer to accept, Hofmann designed laboratory buildings for both universities, which were both subsequently built. In 1865 he succeeded Eilhard Mitscherlich at the University of Berlin as professor of chemistry and director of the chemical laboratory. He held the position until his death in 1892. Following his return to Germany Hofmann was the principal founder of the German Chemical Society (Deutsche Chemische Gesellschaft zu Berlin) (1867) and served 14 terms as its president.

== Contributions ==
Hofmann's work covered a wide range of organic chemistry.

=== Organic synthesis ===
Hofmann was a major contributor to the development of techniques for organic synthesis, which originated at Liebig's laboratory in Giessen. Hofmann and John Blyth were the first to use the term "synthesis", in their paper "On Styrole, and Some of the Products of Its Decomposition," predating Kolbe's use of the term by some months. What Blyth and Hofmann called "synthesis" enabled them to make inferences about the constitution of styrole. A subsequent paper, Muspratt and Hofmann's "On Toluidine", described some of the first "synthetical experiments" (synthetische Versuche) in the field of organic chemistry.

While the ultimate goal of such experiments was to artificially produce naturally occurring substances, such a goal was not practically attainable at the time. The immediate purpose of the technique was the application of known reactions to a variety of materials to discover what products could be formed. Understanding a substance's method of formation was an important step in placing it within a developing taxonomy of substances. This technique became the basis of Hofmann's research program. He used organic synthesis as a method of investigation, to increase chemical understanding of reaction products and the processes by which they were formed.

=== Coal tar and anilines ===
Hofmann's first research investigations, carried out in Liebig's laboratory at Giessen, was an examination of the organic bases of coal tar. Hofmann successfully isolated Kyanol and Leucol, bases previously reported by Friedlieb Ferdinand Runge, and showed that Kyanol was almost entirely aniline, previously shown to be a decomposition product of the plant dye indigo. In his first publication (1843) he demonstrated that a variety of substances which had been identified in contemporary chemical literature as obtainable from coal tar naphtha and its derivatives were all a single nitrogenous base, aniline. These included Kyanol, Carl Julius Fritzsche's Anilin, Otto Unverdorben's Krystallin, and Nikolai Zinin's Benzidam. Much of his subsequent work further developed understanding of the natural alkaloids.

Hofmann drew an analogy between aniline and ammonia. He wanted to convince chemists that organic bases could be described in terms of derivatives of ammonia. Hofmann successfully converted ammonia into ethylamine and the compounds diethylamine, triethylamine, and tetraethylammonium. He was the first chemist to synthesize the quaternary amines. His method of converting an amide into an amine is known as the Hofmann rearrangement.

While primary, secondary, and tertiary amines were stable when distilled at high temperatures under alkaline conditions, the quaternary amine was not. Heating quaternary tetraethylammonium hydroxide yielded tertiary triethylamine vapour. This became the basis of what is now known as the Hofmann elimination, a method for converting quaternary amines into tertiary amines. Hofmann successfully applied the method to coniine, the cholinergic poison of hemlock, to derive the first structure of an alkaloid. His method became extremely significant as a tool for examining the molecular structures of alkaloids, and was eventually applied to morphine, coca amine, atropine, and tubocurarine, among others. Coniine eventually became the first of the alkaloids to be artificially synthesised.

In 1848, Hofmann's student Charles Blachford Mansfield developed a method of fractional distillation of coal tar and separated out benzene, xylene, and toluene, an essential step towards the development of products from coal tar.

In 1856, Hofmann's student William Henry Perkin was attempting to synthesize quinine at the Royal College of Chemistry in London, when he discovered the first aniline dye, mauveine. The discovery led to the creation of a wide range of artificially created colourful textile dyes, revolutionising the fashion world. Hofmann's researches on rosaniline, which he first prepared in 1858, were the beginning of a series of investigations on colouring matter. In 1863, Hofmann showed that aniline blue is a triphenyl derivative of rosaniline and discovered that different alkyl groups could be introduced into the rosaniline molecule to produce dyes of various purple or violet colours, which became known as 'Hofmann's violets'. In 1864, Hofmann confirmed that magenta can be made not from pure aniline but only by oxidation of commercial aniline in which isomeric orthotoluidine and paratoluidine are present as impurities. Other students of Hofmann's who became involved in the British dyestuffs industry include Edward Chambers Nicholson, George Maule, and George Simpson. After his return to Germany, Hofmann continued to experiment with dyestuffs, finally creating quinoline red in 1887.

Hofmann studied nitrogen bases, including the development of methods for separating mixtures of amines and the preparation of large numbers of "polyammonias" (diamines and triamines such as ethylenediamine and diethylenediamine). He worked with Auguste Cahours on phosphorus bases between 1855 and 1857. With him, in 1857, Hofmann prepared the first aliphatic unsaturated alcohol, allyl alcohol, C3 H5OH. He also examined its derivative, allyl isothiocyanate (mustard oil), in 1868, and studied various other isocyanates and isonitriles (isocyanides, or carbylamines).

Hofmann also developed a method for determining the molecular weights of liquids from vapour densities. Hofmann isolated sorbic acid from rowanberries' oil in 1859, a chemical compound that is widely used as a food preservative.

In 1865, inspired by Auguste Laurent, Hofmann suggested a systematic nomenclature for hydrocarbons and their derivatives. It was adopted internationally by the Geneva Congress, with some modifications, in 1892.

=== Molecular models ===
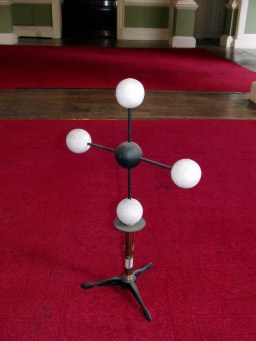
Hofmann's methane model

Hofmann voltameter

Hofmann was apparently the first to introduce molecular models into organic chemistry, following August Kekule's introduction of the theory of chemical structure in 1858, and Alexander Crum Brown's introduction of printed structural formulas in 1861. At a Friday Evening Discourse at London's Royal Institution on April 7, 1865, he displayed molecular models of simple organic substances such as methane, ethane, and methyl chloride, which he had had constructed from differently colored table croquet balls connected together with thin brass tubes. Hofmann's original colour scheme (carbon = black, hydrogen = white, nitrogen = blue, oxygen = red, chlorine = green, and sulphur = yellow) has evolved into the CPK colour scheme and is in use even today. After 1874, when van't Hoff and Le Bel independently suggested organic molecules can be three-dimensional, molecular models began to assume their modern appearance.

=== Hofmann voltameter ===
The Hofmann voltameter is an apparatus for electrolyzing water, invented by August Wilhelm von Hofmann in 1866. It consists of three joined upright cylinders, usually glass. The inner cylinder is open at the top to allow addition of water and an ionic compound to improve conductivity, such as a small amount of sulphuric acid. A platinum electrode is placed inside the bottom of each of the two side cylinders, connected to the positive and negative terminals of a source of electricity. When current is run through Hofmann's Voltameter, gaseous oxygen forms at the anode and gaseous hydrogen at the cathode. Each gas displaces water and collects at the top of the two outer tubes.

== Publications ==
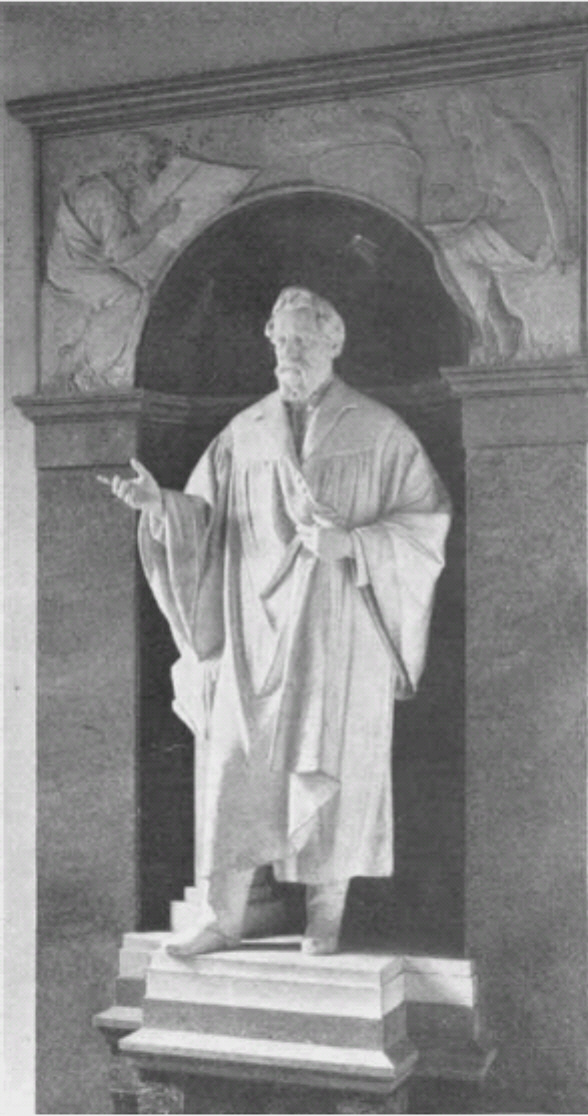
Monument to Hofmann at Berlin, destroyed in 1944 by British air raid

Hofmann was multilingual and published extensively, particularly about his work on coal tar and its derivatives. In 1865 Hofmann published An Introduction to Modern Chemistry, summarising type theory and emerging ideas about chemical structure. Type theory modelled four inorganic molecules, hydrogen, hydrogen chloride, water, and ammonia, and used them as a basis for systematising and categorising both organic and inorganic compounds by exploring the substitution of one or more atoms of hydrogen for an equivalent atom or group. Hofmann himself had focused on researching ammonia, but discussed all four models in his book. In it, he also first introduced the term valence, under its longer variant quantivalence, to describe the combining capacity of an atom. His textbook strongly influenced introductory textbooks in both Europe and the United States.

In addition to his scientific works, Hofmann wrote biographical notices and essays on the history of chemistry, including a study of Liebig.

== Awards and honours ==
He was elected a fellow of the Royal Society in 1851. He was awarded the society's Royal Medal in 1854 and their Copley Medal in 1875 "for his numerous contributions to the science of chemistry, and especially for his researches on the derivatives of ammonia". On his 70th birthday, in 1888, he was ennobled, enabling him to add the prefix "von" before his last name.

In 1900, the German Chemical Society built the "Hofmann-Haus" at Berlin and in 1902 created the August Wilhelm von Hofmann Gold Medal in his honour, to be awarded for outstanding achievements in chemistry. The first recipients were Sir William Ramsay of England and Professor Henri Moissan of Paris.

== Later life ==
Hofmann died in 1892 and was buried in Berlin's Dorotheenstadt Cemetery.

== See also ==
- History of the molecule
- Timeline of hydrogen technologies

== Sources ==
- Bericht über die Entwickelung der chemischen Industrie während des letzten Jahrzehends : im Verein mit Freunden und Fachgenossen erstattet . Volume 1–3.1, Vieweg, Braunschweig 1875 – 1877 Digital edition by the University and State Library Düsseldorf
