= Quaternary carbon =

Carbon atom bound to four other carbon atoms

quaternary carbon
Structural formula of neopentane (quaternary carbon is highlighted red)

A quaternary carbon is a carbon atom bound to four other carbon atoms. For this reason, quaternary carbon atoms are found only in hydrocarbons having at least five carbon atoms. Quaternary carbon atoms can occur in branched alkanes, but not in linear alkanes.

	primary carbon	secondary carbon	tertiary carbon	quaternary carbon
General structure (R = Organyl group)	frameless=1.0	frameless=1.0	frameless=1.0	frameless=1.0
Partial; Structural formula	frameless=1.0	frameless=1.0	frameless=1.0	frameless=1.0

== Synthesis ==
Bis-Phenol A synthesis from acetone and phenol

The formation of chiral quaternary carbon centers has been a synthetic challenge. Chemists have developed asymmetric Diels–Alder reactions, Heck reaction, Enyne cyclization, cycloaddition reactions, C–H activation, Allylic substitution, Pauson–Khand reaction, etc. to construct asymmetric quaternary carbon atoms.

One of the most industrially important compounds containing a quaternary carbon is bis-phenol A (BPA). The central atom is a quaternary carbon. Retrosynthetically, that carbon is the central atom of an acetone molecule before condensation with two equivalents of phenol - BPA Production Process
