= Carbon–carbon bond =

Covalent bond between two carbon atoms

A carbon–carbon bond is a covalent bond between two carbon atoms. The most common form is the single bond: a bond composed of two electrons, one from each of the two atoms. The carbon–carbon single bond is a sigma bond and is formed between one hybridized orbital from each of the carbon atoms. In ethane, the orbitals are sp^{3}-hybridized orbitals, but single bonds formed between carbon atoms with other hybridizations do occur (e.g. sp^{2} to sp^{2}). In fact, the carbon atoms in the single bond need not be of the same hybridization. Carbon atoms can also form double bonds in compounds called alkenes or triple bonds in compounds called alkynes. A double bond is formed with an sp^{2}-hybridized orbital and a p-orbital that is not involved in the hybridization. A triple bond is formed with an sp-hybridized orbital and two p-orbitals from each atom. The use of the p-orbitals forms a pi bond.

== Chains and branching ==
Carbon is one of the few elements that can form long chains of its own atoms, a property called catenation. This coupled with the strength of the carbon–carbon bond gives rise to an enormous number of molecular forms, many of which are important structural elements of life, so carbon compounds have their own field of study: organic chemistry.

2,2,3-trimethylpentane

Branching is also common in C−C skeletons. Carbon atoms in a molecule are categorized by the number of carbon neighbors they have:

- A primary carbon atom has one carbon-atom neighbor.
- A secondary carbon atom has two carbon-atom neighbors.
- A tertiary carbon atom has three carbon-atom neighbors.
- A quaternary carbon atom has four carbon-atom neighbors.

In "structurally complex organic molecules", it is the three-dimensional orientation of the carbon–carbon bonds at quaternary loci which dictates the shape of the molecule. Further, quaternary loci are found in many biologically active small molecules, such as cortisone and morphine.

== Synthesis ==
Carbon–carbon bond-forming reactions are organic reactions in which a new carbon–carbon bond is formed. They are important in the production of many human-made chemicals such as pharmaceuticals and plastics. The reverse reaction, where a carbon-carbon bond is broken, is known as carbon-carbon bond activation.

Some examples of reactions which form carbon–carbon bonds are the aldol reaction, Diels–Alder reaction, Grignard reaction, cross-coupling reactions, the Michael reaction and the Wittig reaction.

The directed synthesis of desired three-dimensional structures for tertiary carbons was largely solved during the late 20th century, but the same ability to direct quaternary carbon synthesis did not start to emerge until the first decade of the 21st century.

== Bond strengths and lengths ==
The carbon–carbon single bond is weaker than C–H, O–H, N–H, H–H, H–Cl, C–F, and many double or triple bonds, and comparable in strength to C–O, Si–O, P–O, and S–H bonds, but is commonly considered as strong.

C–C bond	Molecule	Bond dissociation energy (kcal/mol)
CH_{3}−CH_{3}	ethane	90
C_{6}H_{5}−CH_{3}	toluene	102
C_{6}H_{5}−C_{6}H_{5}	biphenyl	114
CH_{3}C(O)−CH_{3}	acetone	84
CH_{3}−CN	acetonitrile	136
CH_{3}−CH_{2}OH	ethanol	88

The values given above represent C–C bond dissociation energies that are commonly encountered; occasionally, outliers may deviate drastically from this range.

Comparison of bond lengths in simple hydrocarbons
Molecule	Ethane	Ethylene	Acetylene
Formula	C_{2}H_{6}	C_{2}H_{4}	C_{2}H_{2}
Class	alkane	alkene	alkyne
Structure			
Hybridisation of carbon	sp^{3}	sp^{2}	sp
C–C bond length	153.5 pm	133.9 pm	120.3 pm
Proportion of C–C single bond	100%	87%	78%
Structure determination method	microwave spectroscopy	microwave spectroscopy	infrared spectroscopy

== Extreme cases ==
=== Long, weak C–C single bonds ===
Various extreme cases have been identified where the C–C bond is elongated. In Gomberg's dimer, one C–C bond is rather long at 159.7 picometers. It is this bond that reversibly and readily breaks at room temperature in solution:

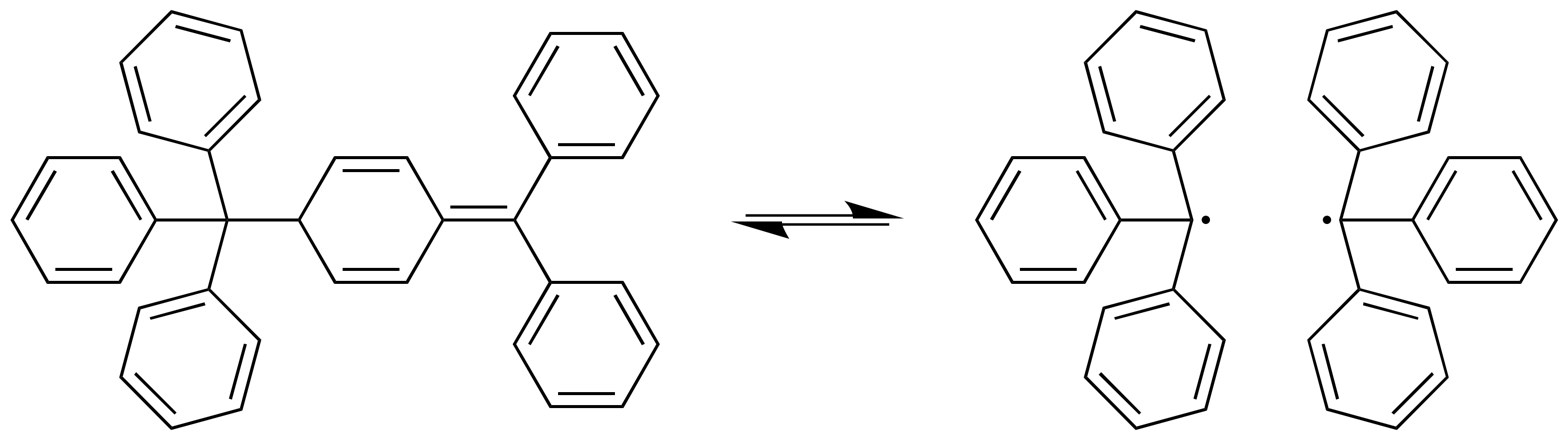

In the even more congested molecule hexakis(3,5-di-tert-butylphenyl)ethane, the bond dissociation energy to form the stabilized triarylmethyl radical is only 8 kcal/mol. Also a consequence of its severe steric congestion, hexakis(3,5-di-tert-butylphenyl)ethane has a greatly elongated central bond with a length of 167 pm.

=== Twisted, weak C–C double bonds ===
The structure of tetrakis(dimethylamino)ethylene (TDAE) is highly distorted. The dihedral angle for the two N_{2}C ends is 28º although the C=C distance is normal 135 pm. The nearly isostructural tetraisopropylethylene also has a C=C distance of 135 pm, but its C_{6} core is planar.

=== Short, strong C–C triple bonds ===
On the opposite extreme, the central carbon–carbon single bond of diacetylene is very strong at 160 kcal/mol, as the single bond joins two carbons of sp hybridization. Carbon–carbon multiple bonds are generally stronger; the double bond of ethylene and triple bond of acetylene have been determined to have bond dissociation energies of 174 and 230 kcal/mol, respectively. A very short triple bond of 115 pm has been observed for the iodonium species [HC≡C–I^{+}Ph] [CF_{3}SO_{3}^{–}], due to the strongly electron-withdrawing iodonium moiety.

== See also ==
- Carbon–hydrogen bond
- Carbon–oxygen bond
- Carbon–nitrogen bond
