= R group =

R group may refer to:

In chemistry:

- Pendant group or side group
- Side chain
- Substituent

In mathematics:

- Tempered representation
