= N-Hydroxypiperidine =

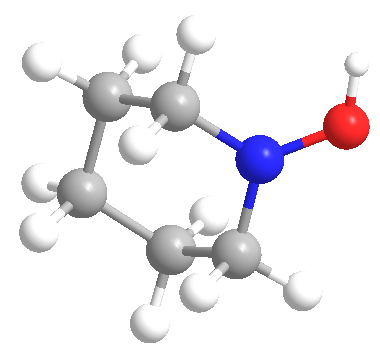

Names
- Preferred IUPAC name Piperidin-1-ol
- Other names 1-Hydroxypiperidine

Identifiers
| CAS Number | 4801-58-5 |
| 3D model (JSmol) | Interactive image |
| Beilstein Reference | 102726 |
| ChemSpider | 19696 |
| ECHA InfoCard | 100.023.057 |
| PubChem CID | 24880003 |
| UNII | 9ANQ5DB3A2 |
| CompTox Dashboard (EPA) | DTXSID9063611 |
- InChI: InChI=1S/C5H11NO/c7-6-4-2-1-3-5-6/h7H,1-5H2
- SMILES: ON1CCCCC1

Properties
| Chemical formula | C_{5}H_{11}NO |
| Molar mass | 101.149 g·mol^{−1} |
| Appearance | Fine white crystals |
| Density | 1.070 g/cm^{3} |
| Melting point | 39.3 °C (102.7 °F; 312.4 K) |
| Boiling point | 98.5 °C (209.3 °F; 371.6 K) |
| Solubility in water | 113 g/L |
| log P | −0.17 |
| Vapor pressure | 0.542 Torr |

Hazards
| NFPA 704 (fire diamond) | 0 2 0 |
| Flash point | 84.9 °C (184.8 °F; 358.0 K) |
| Safety data sheet (SDS) | External MSDS |
- Except where otherwise noted, data are given for materials in their standard state (at 25 °C [77 °F], 100 kPa). Infobox references

N-Hydroxypiperidine (also known as 1-piperidinol and 1-hydroxypiperidine) is the chemical compound with formula C_{5}H_{11}NO. It is a hydroxylated derivative of the heterocyclic compound piperidine.

== Preparation ==
N-Hydroxypiperidine can be prepared from the application of meta-chloroperoxybenzoic acid and methanol to the tertiary amine product of acrylonitrile and piperidine, followed by heating with acetone of the resulting tertiary N-oxide.

== Reactions ==
N-Hydroxypiperidine is a secondary amine, which can undergo an oxidation reaction with hydrogen peroxide in methanol as the solvent. This produces a nitrone, which is heteroatomic equivalent to a ketone with a nitrogen instead of an alpha carbon. Competing elimination reactions can occur, as well.
