= Royal College of Chemistry =

Former college in London, England

Coordinates: 51.5147°N 0.1449°W

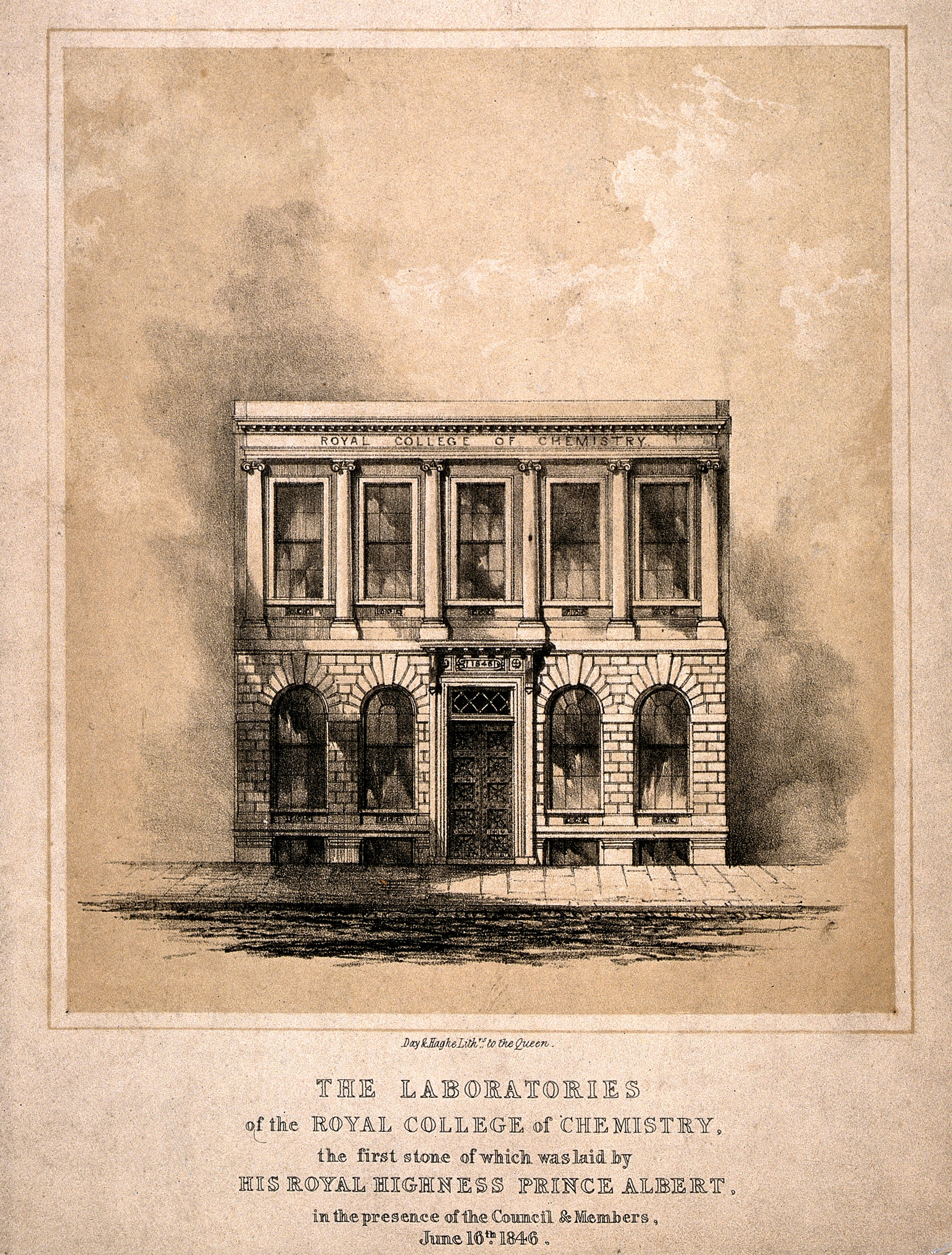
The Royal College of Chemistry: the laboratories. Lithograph

The Royal College of Chemistry (RCC) was a college originally based on Oxford Street in central London, England. It operated between 1845 and 1872.

The original building was designed by the English architect James Lockyer in 1846 with the foundation stone being laid by Albert, Prince Consort on June 16, 1846.

The College was set up to teach practical chemistry. Many politicians donated funds to establish the college, including Benjamin Disraeli, William Gladstone and Robert Peel. It was also supported by Prince Albert.

The first director was August Wilhelm von Hofmann. Frederick Augustus Abel studied under von Hofmann. Sir William Crookes, Edward Divers and J. A. R. Newlands also attended the college.

The young William Henry Perkin studied and worked at the college under von Hofmann, but resigned his position after discovering the first synthetic dye, mauveine, in 1856. Perkin's discovery was prompted by his work with von Hofmann on the substance aniline, derived from coal tar, and it was this breakthrough which sparked the synthetic dye industry, a boom which some historians have labelled 'the second chemical revolution'.

The college was merged into the Royal School of Mines in 1853. It was the first constituent college of Imperial College London and eventually became the Imperial College Chemistry Department.
