= Tertiary carbon =

tertiary Carbon
Structural formula of isobutane (tertiary carbon is highlighted red)

A tertiary carbon atom is a carbon atom bound to three other carbon atoms. For this reason, tertiary carbon atoms are found only in hydrocarbons containing at least four carbon atoms. They are called saturated hydrocarbons because they only contain carbon-carbon single bonds. Tertiary carbons have a hybridization of sp3. Tertiary carbon atoms can occur, for example, in branched alkanes, but not in linear alkanes.

	primary carbon	secondary carbon	tertiary carbon	quaternary carbon
General structure (R = Organyl group)	frameless=1.0	frameless=1.0	frameless=1.0	frameless=1.0
Partial; Structural formula	frameless=1.0	frameless=1.0	frameless=1.0	frameless=1.0

A tertiary carbon attached to a functional group.

== Nomenclature ==
The R is the functional group attached to a tertiary carbon. If the functional group was an OH group, this compound would be commonly called tert-butanol or t-butanol. When a functional group is attached to a tertiary carbon, the prefix -tert (-t) is used in the common name for the compound. An example of this is shown in the figure.

== Significance ==
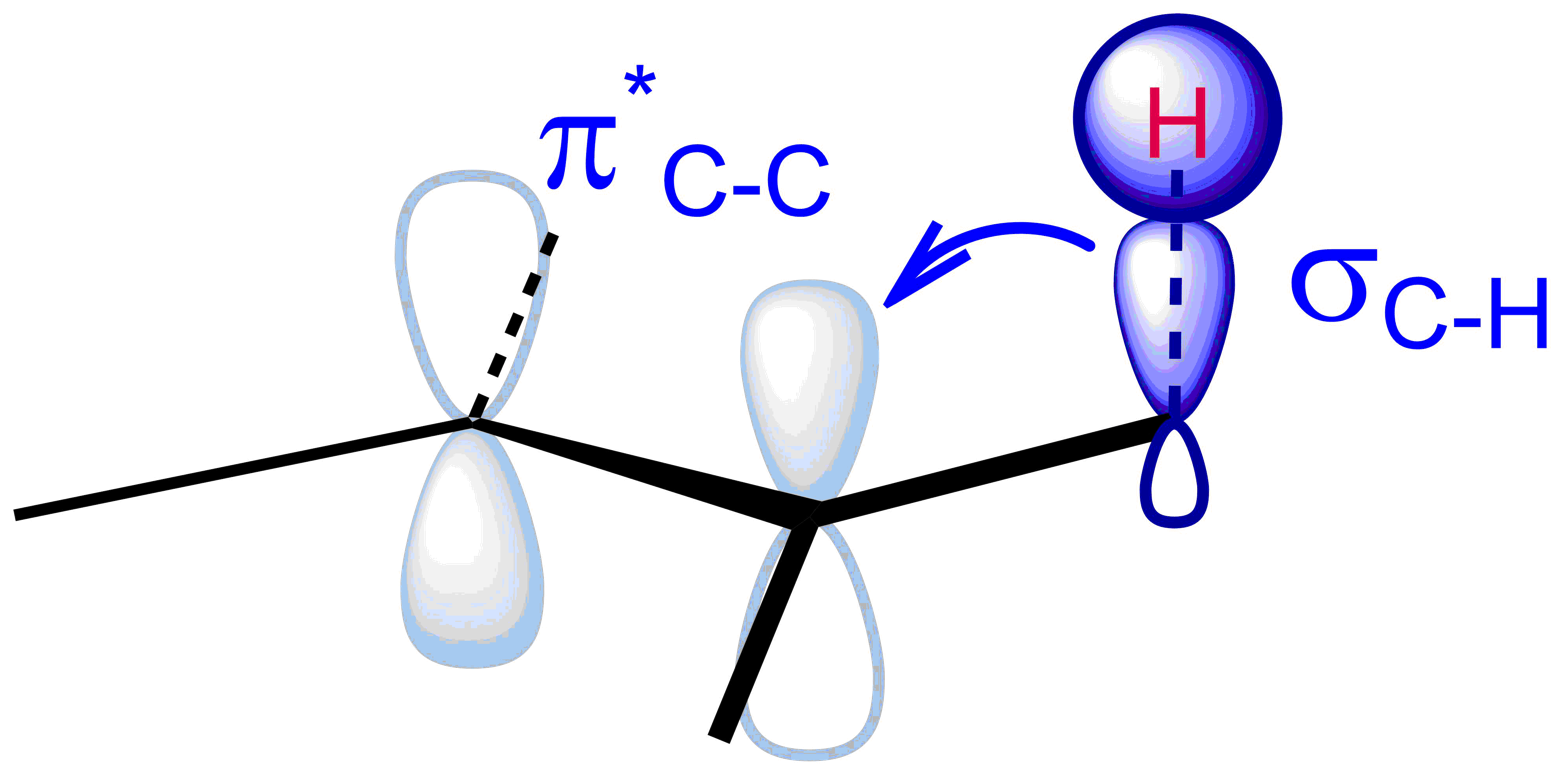
In the figure, the sp3 orbitals on the alkyl group interact and overlap with the vacant p orbital on the carbocation.

=== Carbocation Stability ===
Tertiary carbons form the most stable carbocations due to a combination of factors. The three alkyl groups on the tertiary carbon contribute to a strong inductive effect. This is because each alkyl group will share its electron density with the central carbocation to stabilize it. Additionally, the surrounding sp3 hybridized carbons can stabilize the carbocation through hyperconjugation. This occurs when adjacent sp3 orbitals have a weak overlap with the vacant p orbital; since there are 3 surrounding carbons with sp3 hybridization, there are more opportunities for overlap, which contributes to increasing carbocation stability.

=== Reaction Mechanisms ===
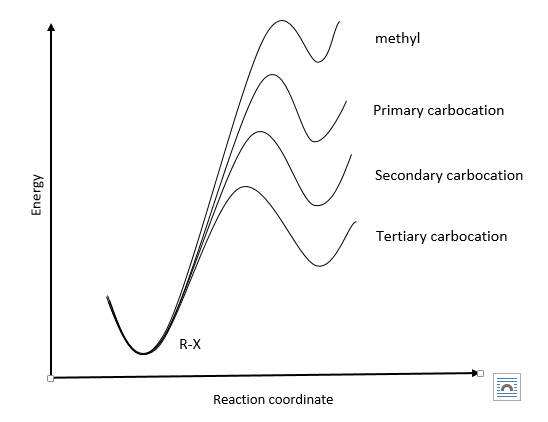
The transition states for SN1 reactions that showcases tertiary carbons have the lowest transition state energy level in SN1 reactions.

A tertiary carbocation will maximize the rate of reaction for an SN1 reaction by producing a stable carbocation. This happens because the rate determining step of a SN1 reaction is the formation of the carbocation. The rate of the reaction is therefore reliant on the stability of the carbocation because it means that the transition state has a lower energy level which makes the activation energy lower. Tertiary carbons are similarly preferred in E1 for the same reasons as it has a carbocation intermediate. E1 and E2 reactions follow Zaitsev's rule which states that the most substituted product in an elimination reactions is going to be the major product because it will be favored for its stability. This leads to tertiary carbons being preferred for their stability in elimination reactions. In general, SN2 reactions do not occur with tertiary carbons because of the steric hindrance produced by the substituted groups. However, recent research has shown there are exceptions to this rule; for the first time, a bimolecular nucleophilic substitution, aka SN2 reaction, can happen to a tertiary carbon.
