= Secondary carbon =

secondary Carbon
Structural formula of propane (secondary carbon is highlighted red)

A secondary carbon is a carbon atom bound to two other carbon atoms and has sp3 hybridization. For this reason, secondary carbon atoms are found in almost (neopentane, for example, does not have any secondary carbon atoms) all hydrocarbons having at least three carbon atoms. In unbranched alkanes, the inner carbon atoms are always secondary carbon atoms (see figure).

| | primary carbon | secondary carbon | tertiary carbon | quaternary carbon |
| General structure (R = Organyl group) | frameless=1.0 | frameless=1.0 | frameless=1.0 | frameless=1.0 |
| Partial; Structural formula | frameless=1.0 | frameless=1.0 | frameless=1.0 | frameless=1.0 |
