= Primary carbon =

Carbon atom bound to one other carbon in a molecule

Primary Carbon
Structural formula of propane (C_{3}H_{8}; primary carbons are highlighted red)

In organic chemistry, a primary carbon is a carbon atom of an alkane or alkyl group that is bound to only one other carbon atom. It is thus sp^{3}-hybridized and at the end of a carbon chain. In case of an alkane, three hydrogen atoms are bound to a primary carbon (see propane in the figure on the right). A hydrogen atom could also be replaced by a hydroxy group (−OH), which would make the molecule a primary alcohol.

| | primary carbon | secondary carbon | tertiary carbon | quaternary carbon |
| General structure (R = Organyl group) | frameless=1.0 | frameless=1.0 | frameless=1.0 | frameless=1.0 |
| Partial; Structural formula | frameless=1.0 | frameless=1.0 | frameless=1.0 | frameless=1.0 |
