= Camille Dreyfus Teacher-Scholar Awards =

Award in chemistry

The Camille Dreyfus Teacher-Scholar Awards are awards given to early-career researchers in chemistry by The Camille and Henry Dreyfus Foundation, Inc. "to support the research and teaching careers of talented young faculty in the chemical sciences." The Dreyfus Teacher-Scholar program began in 1970. In 1994, the program was divided into two parallel awards: The Camille Dreyfus Teacher-Scholar Awards Program, aimed at research universities, and the Henry Dreyfus Teacher-Scholar Awards Program, directed at primarily undergraduate institutions. This list compiles all the pre-1994 Teacher-Scholars, and the subsequent Camille Dreyfus Teacher-Scholars.

The annually presented awards consist of a monetary prize of $75,000, which was increased to $100,000 starting in 2019. Seven winners of the Camille Dreyfus Teacher-Scholar Awards have gone on to win the Nobel Prize in Chemistry, including Paul L. Modrich, Richard R. Schrock, Robert H. Grubbs, K. Barry Sharpless, Ahmed H. Zewail, Mario J. Molina and Yuan Tseh Lee.

== Recipients ==
Source: Dreyfus Foundation

=== 1970 ===
- Robert G. Bergman, California Institute of Technology
- Bruce A. Cunningham, Rockefeller University
- Richard D. Fink, Amherst College
- Joseph N. Gayles Jr., Morehouse College
- O. Hayes Griffith, University of Oregon
- Daniel S. Kemp, Massachusetts Institute of Technology
- Fredric M. Menger, Emory University
- Paul B. Moore, The University of Chicago
- John A. Osborn, Harvard University
- Mitchel Shen, University of California, Berkeley
- Barry M. Trost, University of Wisconsin–Madison
- Richard A. Walton, Purdue University
- F. Sheldon Wettack, Hope College
- James T. Yardley, University of Illinois at Urbana-Champaign

=== 1971 ===
- Jesse L. Beauchamp, California Institute of Technology
- David A. Evans, University of California, Los Angeles
- Peter C. Ford, University of California, Santa Barbara
- Yuan T. Lee, The University of Chicago
- Stephen J. Lippard, Columbia University
- Kenneth G. Mann, University of Minnesota
- J. David Puett, Vanderbilt University
- Stanley I. Sandler, University of Delaware
- Lothar Schäfer, University of Arkansas
- Robert J. Silbey, Massachusetts Institute of Technology
- James Snyder, Yeshiva University
- Leonard D. Spicer, The University of Utah
- Leonard M. Stephenson, Stanford University
- Edward I. Stiefel, Stony Brook University
- John S. Swenton, Ohio State University
- Claude H. Yoder, Franklin & Marshall College

=== 1972 ===
- Jon Bordner, North Carolina State University
- C. Hackett Bushweller, Worcester Polytechnic Institute
- Jon Clardy, Iowa State University
- Patricia A. Clark, Vassar College
- Clark K. Colton, Massachusetts Institute of Technology
- Karl F. Freed, The University of Chicago
- Robert M. Gavin, Haverford College
- James F. Harrison, Michigan State University
- David N. Hendrickson, University of Illinois at Urbana-Champaign
- Kendall N. Houk, Louisiana State University
- Arnold J. Levine, Princeton University
- J. Michael McBride, Yale University
- William R. Moomaw, Williams College
- William P. Reinhardt, Harvard University
- Frederick S. Richardson, University of Virginia
- John H. Seinfeld, California Institute of Technology
- Frank A. Weinhold, Stanford University

=== 1973 ===
- William H. Breckenridge, The University of Utah
- Michael P. Doyle, Hope College
- Irving R. Epstein, Brandeis University
- Martin Feinberg, University of Rochester
- Frederick D. Lewis, Northwestern University
- Richard Losick, Harvard University
- William Hughes Miller, University of California, Berkeley
- David L. Nelson, University of Wisconsin-Madison
- David F. Ollis, Princeton University
- Michael R. Philpott, University of Oregon
- Douglas Poland, Johns Hopkins University
- David J. Prescott, Bryn Mawr College
- Peter R. Rony, Virginia Polytechnic Institute and State University
- Martin F. Semmelhack, Cornell University
- K. Barry Sharpless, Massachusetts Institute of Technology
- Robert W. Vaughan, California Institute of Technology

=== 1974 ===
- Niels H. Andersen, University of Washington
- Jay Bailey, University of Houston
- Robert D. Bereman, State University of New York at Buffalo
- Michael Berry, University of Wisconsin-Madison
- Robert G. Bryant, University of Minnesota
- Francis J. Castellino, University of Notre Dame
- Janet Del Bene, Youngstown State University
- Robert H. Grubbs, Michigan State University
- Leroy E. Hood, California Institute of Technology
- Bruce S. Hudson, Stanford University
- John Katzenellenbogen, University of Illinois at Urbana-Champaign
- Denis A. Kohl, University of Texas at Austin
- Edward Penhoet, University of California, Berkeley
- Herschel Rabitz, Princeton University
- Robert F. Schleif, Brandeis University
- Jeffrey Zink, University of California, Los Angeles

=== 1975 ===
- Larry R. Dalton, Vanderbilt University
- Victor W. Day, University of Nebraska–Lincoln
- Robert Ditchfield, Dartmouth College
- Elvera Ehrenfeld, The University of Utah
- Thomas F. George, University of Rochester
- William C. Harris, Furman University
- Wayne L. Hubbell, University of California, Berkeley
- Marc W. Kirschner, Princeton University
- Lynn C. Klotz, Harvard University
- L. Gary Leal, California Institute of Technology
- W. Carl Lineberger, University of Colorado Boulder
- Patrick S. Mariano, Texas A&M University
- Tobin J. Marks, Northwestern University
- James A. Spudich, University of California, San Francisco
- Mark S. Wrighton, Massachusetts Institute of Technology

=== 1976 ===
- Ronald W. Davis, Stanford University
- William M. Gelbart, University of California, Los Angeles
- George C. Levy, Florida State University
- Roger K. Murray, Jr., University of Delaware
- Jack R. Norton, Princeton University
- Larry E. Overman, University of California, Irvine
- Alexander Pines, University of California, Berkeley
- Christopher A. Reed, University of Southern California
- Robert G. Roeder, Washington University in St. Louis
- William H. Scouten, Bucknell University
- Barbara Ramsay Shaw, Duke University
- John P. Simons, The University of Utah
- Christopher T. Walsh, Massachusetts Institute of Technology
- W. Henry Weinberg, California Institute of Technology
- John R. Wiesenfeld, Cornell University

=== 1977 ===
- John E. Bercaw, California Institute of Technology
- Robert E. Cohen, Massachusetts Institute of Technology
- Paul J. Dagdigian, Johns Hopkins University
- David Dressler, Harvard University
- John R. Eyler, University of Florida
- Michael D. Fayer, Stanford University
- Gregory L. Geoffroy, The Pennsylvania State University
- Eric J. Heller, University of California, Los Angeles
- Kenneth D. Jordan, Yale University
- Harold L. Kohn, University of Houston
- Paul L. Modrich, Duke University
- Mario J. Molina, University of California, Irvine
- John S. Olson, Rice University
- Hong Yong Sohn, The University of Utah
- George Stephanopoulos, University of Minnesota
- Dwight A. Sweigart, Swarthmore College

=== 1978 ===
- Peter B. Dervan, California Institute of Technology
- David A. Dixon, University of Minnesota
- James A. Dumesic, University of Wisconsin-Madison
- William J. Evans, The University of Chicago
- Bruce Ganem, Cornell University
- William L. Jorgensen, Purdue University
- Michael E. Jung, University of California, Los Angeles
- Thomas F. Keyes, Yale University
- Daniel A. Kleier, Williams College
- Walter G. Klemperer, Columbia University
- Nancy H. Kolodny, Wellesley College
- F. Raymond Salemme, University of Arizona
- Richard R. Schrock, Massachusetts Institute of Technology
- John R. Shapley, University of Illinois at Urbana-Champaign
- Amos B. Smith III, University of Pennsylvania
- K. Peter C. Vollhardt, University of California, Berkeley

=== 1979 ===
- Thomas A. Albright, University of Houston
- Douglas L. Brutlag, Stanford University
- Jeremy K. Burdett, The University of Chicago
- Malcolm H. Chisholm, Indiana University
- Gary G. Christoph, Ohio State University
- Christos Georgakis, Massachusetts Institute of Technology
- Christopher G. Goff, Haverford College
- David R. Herrick, University of Oregon
- Philip M. Keehn, Brandeis University
- Nancy E. Kleckner, Harvard University
- George McLendon, University of Rochester
- Horia Metiu, University of California, Santa Barbara
- Kathlyn A. Parker, Brown University
- Christian R. H. Raetz, University of Wisconsin-Madison
- Gary B. Schuster, University of Illinois at Urbana-Champaign
- Ahmed H. Zewail, California Institute of Technology

=== 1980 ===
- Bruce S. Ault, University of Cincinnati
- Steven G. Boxer, Stanford University
- Harry G. Brittain, Seton Hall University
- Chris K. Chang, Michigan State University
- Marye Anne Fox, University of Texas at Austin
- John A. Gladysz, University of California, Los Angeles
- Paul L. Houston, Cornell University
- Joseph N. Kushick, Amherst College
- Elias Lazarides, California Institute of Technology
- Martin Newcomb, Texas A&M University
- Kyriacos C. Nicolaou, University of Pennsylvania
- David W. Oxtoby, The University of Chicago
- Mary Fedarko Roberts, Massachusetts Institute of Technology
- Matthew V. Tirrell III, University of Minnesota
- Paul A. Wender, Harvard University
- Myung-Hwan Whangbo, North Carolina State University

=== 1981 ===
- Robert C. Aller, The University of Chicago
- Alfons L. Baumstark, Georgia State University
- Lewis C. Cantley, Harvard University
- John H. Clark, University of California, Berkeley
- Robert H. Crabtree, Yale University
- Richard G. Finke, University of Oregon
- Stephan S. Isied, Rutgers, The State University of New Jersey
- Alan P. Kozikowski, University of Pittsburgh
- Dennis Liotta, Emory University
- Gary L. Miessler, St. Olaf College
- Glenn D. Prestwich, Stony Brook University
- Mary C. Rakowski DuBois, University of Colorado Boulder
- James E. Rothman, Stanford University
- George C. Schatz, Northwestern University
- Neil E. Schore, University of California, Davis
- Costas G. Vayenas, Massachusetts Institute of Technology
- Keith R. Yamamoto, University of California, San Francisco

=== 1982 ===
- Alan Campion, University of Texas at Austin
- F. Fleming Crim, University of Wisconsin-Madison
- G. William Daub, Harvey Mudd College
- John H. Dawson, University of South Carolina
- Glenn T. Evans, Oregon State University
- Graham R. Fleming, The University of Chicago
- Evan R. Kantrowitz, Boston College
- J. Andrew McCammon, University of Houston
- C. William McCurdy, Ohio State University
- Cheuk-Yiu Ng, Iowa State University
- Maria C. Pellegrini, University of Southern California
- Kevin S. Peters, Harvard University
- Thomas B. Rauchfuss, University of Illinois at Urbana-Champaign
- Barry B. Snider, Brandeis University
- Gregory Stephanopoulos, California Institute of Technology

=== 1983 ===
- Robert A. Brown, Massachusetts Institute of Technology
- Andrew E. DePristo, Iowa State University
- Kenneth C. Janda, California Institute of Technology
- Frederick W. King, University of Wisconsin-Eau Claire
- Branka M. Ladanyi, Colorado State University
- Shaul Mukamel, University of Rochester
- Matthew S. Platz, Ohio State University
- James P. Reilly, Indiana University
- Mark H. Thiemens, University of California, San Diego
- Craig A. Townsend, Johns Hopkins University
- Veronica Vaida, Harvard University
- David M. Walba, University of Colorado Boulder
- R. Stanley Williams, University of California, Los Angeles

=== 1984 ===
- Bruce E. Bursten, Ohio State University
- Dennis A. Dougherty, California Institute of Technology
- Barbara J. Garrison, The Pennsylvania State University
- Miklos Kertesz, Georgetown University
- Bruce H. Lipshutz, University of California, Santa Barbara
- David G. Lynn, The University of Chicago
- Alice C. Mignerey, University of Maryland, College Park
- Peter J. Rossky, University of Texas at Austin
- H. Bernhard Schlegel, Wayne State University
- Stuart L. Schreiber, Yale University
- James L. Skinner, Columbia University
- David S. Soane, University of California, Berkeley

=== 1985 ===
- Krishnan Balasubramanian, Arizona State University
- Gary W. Brudvig, Yale University
- Terrence J. Collins, California Institute of Technology
- Dennis P. Curran, University of Pittsburgh
- Klavs F. Jensen, University of Minnesota
- William D. Jones, University of Rochester
- Nathan S. Lewis, Stanford University
- Lanny S. Liebeskind, Emory University
- David M. Ronis, Harvard University
- Ian P. Rothwell, Purdue University
- Ming-Daw Tsai, Ohio State University
- Bonnie Ann Wallace, Columbia University

=== 1986 ===
- Jacqueline K. Barton, Columbia University
- John F. Brady, California Institute of Technology
- Sylvia T. Ceyer, Massachusetts Institute of Technology
- Michael M. Cox, University of Wisconsin-Madison
- Richard A. Friesner, University of Texas at Austin
- Jeffrey C. Kantor, University of Notre Dame
- Marsha I. Lester, University of Pennsylvania
- William J. McGinnis, Yale University
- Geraldine L. Richmond, University of Oregon
- Jasper Rine, University of California, Berkeley
- Richard H. Scheller, Stanford University
- Patricia A. Thiel, Iowa State University

=== 1987 ===
- Peter B. Armentrout, The University of Utah
- Anthony G. M. Barrett, Northwestern University
- Peter F. Bernath, University of Arizona
- George Christou, Indiana University
- Bruce Demple, Harvard University
- Francois N. Diederich, University of California, Los Angeles
- Gary P. Drobny, University of Washington
- Gregory S. Ezra, Cornell University
- John W. Frost, Stanford University
- Keith P. Johnston, University of Texas at Austin
- Kevin K. Lehmann, Princeton University
- Jeffrey A. Reimer, University of California, Berkeley

=== 1988 ===
- Donald R. Bobbitt, University of Arkansas
- Stephen L. Buchwald, Massachusetts Institute of Technology
- Charles T. Campbell, Indiana University
- Ken Feldman, The Pennsylvania State University
- Paul L. Frattini, Carnegie Mellon University
- Gregory S. Girolami, University of Illinois at Urbana-Champaign
- Robert R. Lucchese, Texas A&M University
- R. J. Dwayne Miller, University of Rochester
- Jonathan L. Sessler, University of Texas at Austin
- Michael E. Silver, Hope College
- Angelica Stacy, University of California, Berkeley
- Thomas D. Tullius, Johns Hopkins University
- Daniel P. Weitekamp, California Institute of Technology
- Kurt W. Zilm, Yale University

=== 1989 ===
- Scott L. Anderson, Stony Brook University
- Laurie J. Butler, The University of Chicago
- Rob D. Coalson, University of Pittsburgh
- Anthony W. Czarnik, Ohio State University
- Hai-Lung Dai, University of Pennsylvania
- Pablo G. Debenedetti, Princeton University
- Andrew G. Ewing, The Pennsylvania State University
- Alice P. Gast, Stanford University
- Marie E. Krafft, Florida State University
- Atsuo Kuki, Cornell University
- Thomas E. Mallouk, University of Texas at Austin
- John D. Simon, University of California, San Diego
- Michael Trenary, University of Illinois at Chicago
- Steven C. Zimmerman, University of Illinois at Urbana-Champaign

=== 1990 ===
- Peter Chen, Harvard University
- Kim R. Dunbar, Michigan State University
- Juli F. Feigon, University of California, Los Angeles
- Joseph S. Francisco, Wayne State University
- Mark A. Johnson, Yale University
- Michael Kahn, University of Illinois at Chicago
- Charles M. Lieber, Columbia University
- Andrew G. Myers, California Institute of Technology
- Scott D. Rychnovsky, University of Minnesota
- W. Mark Saltzman, Johns Hopkins University
- Devarajan Thirumalai, University of Maryland, College Park
- Nancy L. Thompson, The University of North Carolina at Chapel Hill

=== 1991 ===
- Victoria Buch, University of Illinois at Chicago
- Jeffrey A. Cina, The University of Chicago
- Ariel Fernandez, University of Miami
- Glenn H. Fredrickson, University of California, Santa Barbara
- David E. Hansen, Amherst College
- Joseph T. Hupp, Northwestern University
- Richard B. Kaner, University of California, Los Angeles
- Peter T. Lansbury, Jr., Massachusetts Institute of Technology
- Roger F. Loring, Cornell University
- Daniel M. Neumark, University of California, Berkeley
- Gerard Parkin, Columbia University
- Andrzej T. Rajca, Kansas State University

=== 1992 ===
- Patricia A. Bianconi, The Pennsylvania State University
- Emily A. Carter, University of California, Los Angeles
- Alan S. Goldman, Rutgers, The State University of New Jersey
- Gerard S. Harbison, University of Nebraska–Lincoln
- W. Dean Harman, University of Virginia
- Joel M. Hawkins, University of California, Berkeley
- Eric N. Jacobsen, University of Illinois at Urbana-Champaign
- Anne B. Myers, University of Rochester
- Gilbert M. Nathanson, University of Wisconsin-Madison
- Athanassios Z. Panagiotopoulos, Cornell University
- Gustavo E. Scuseria, Rice University
- Gregory L. Verdine, Harvard University
- Alec M. Wodtke, University of California, Santa Barbara

=== 1993 ===
- Jean S. Baum, Rutgers, The State University of New Jersey
- Brian E. Bent, Columbia University
- Jennifer S. Brodbelt, University of Texas at Austin
- Robert J. Cave, Harvey Mudd College
- Christopher E. D. Chidsey, Stanford University
- Bradley F. Chmelka, University of California, Santa Barbara
- David W. Christianson, University of Pennsylvania
- William S. Hammack, Carnegie Mellon University
- Mark J. Hampden-Smith, University of New Mexico
- Barbara Imperiali, California Institute of Technology
- Mercouri G. Kanatzidis, Michigan State University
- Eric T. Kool, University of Rochester
- Jane E. G. Lipson, Dartmouth College
- Thomas V. O'Halloran, Northwestern University
- Thomas C. Pochapsky, Brandeis University
- Alanna Schepartz, Yale University
- Athan J. Shaka, University of California, Irvine
- L. Keith Woo, Iowa State University
- Matthew B. Zimmt, Brown University

=== 1994 ===
- Eric V. Anslyn, University of Texas at Austin
- Thomas P. Beebe, Jr., The University of Utah
- Pamela J. Bjorkman, California Institute of Technology
- Arup K. Chakraborty, University of California, Berkeley
- James A. Cowan, Ohio State University
- Amir H. Hoveyda, Boston College
- Jeffery W. Kelly, Texas A&M University
- Chi H. Mak, University of Southern California
- Craig A. Merlic, University of California, Los Angeles
- Jeffrey S. Moore, University of Illinois at Urbana-Champaign
- Michael J. Sailor, University of California, San Diego
- Eric S. G. Shaqfeh, Stanford University
- Margaret A. Tolbert, University of Colorado Boulder
- Patrick H. Vaccaro, Yale University
- Gregory A. Voth, University of Pennsylvania
- Theodore S. Widlanski, Indiana University

=== 1995 ===
- Gary D. Glick, University of Michigan
- Brent L. Iverson, University of Texas at Austin
- Robert J. Levis, Wayne State University
- Gaetano T. Montelione, Rutgers, The State University of New Jersey
- Reginald M. Penner, University of California, Irvine
- Lynne Regan, Yale University
- Lawrence R. Sita, The University of Chicago
- Timothy M. Swager, University of Pennsylvania
- H. Holden Thorp, The University of North Carolina at Chapel Hill
- William B. Tolman, University of Minnesota
- Eric J. Toone, Duke University
- Zhen-Gang Wang, California Institute of Technology
- James R. Williamson, Massachusetts Institute of Technology
- Peter Wipf, University of Pittsburgh
- Sarah A. Woodson, University of Maryland, College Park
- John Z. H. Zhang, New York University

=== 1996 ===
- Guillermo C. Bazan, University of Rochester
- D. Scott Bohle, University of Wyoming
- Christopher N. Bowman, University of Colorado Boulder
- Mark J. Burk, Duke University
- Erick M. Carreira, California Institute of Technology
- Robert E. Continetti, University of California, San Diego
- Andrew D. Ellington, Indiana University
- Lucio Frydman, University of Illinois at Chicago
- John H. Griffin, Stanford University
- Laura L. Kiessling, University of Wisconsin-Madison
- Chad A. Mirkin, Northwestern University
- Karin Musier-Forsyth, University of Minnesota
- James S. Nowick, University of California, Irvine
- Norbert F. Scherer, University of Pennsylvania
- Jonathan V. Sweedler, University of Illinois at Urbana-Champaign
- Susan C. Tucker, University of California, Davis
- Jackie Y. Ying, Massachusetts Institute of Technology

=== 1997 ===
- Eray S. Aydil, University of California, Santa Barbara
- Juan J. de Pablo, University of Wisconsin-Madison
- Peter K. Dorhout, Colorado State University
- Gregory C. Fu, Massachusetts Institute of Technology
- Konstantinos P. Giapis, California Institute of Technology
- Richard A. Goldstein, University of Michigan
- John F. Hartwig, Yale University
- Nancy Makri, University of Illinois at Urbana-Champaign
- Frank E. McDonald, Northwestern University
- Dale F. Mierke, Clark University
- Karl T. Mueller, The Pennsylvania State University
- Todd M. Przybycien, Rensselaer Polytechnic Institute
- Vincent M. Rotello, University of Massachusetts Amherst
- Igal Szleifer, Purdue University
- Michael J. Therien, University of Pennsylvania
- Ziling (Ben) Xue, The University of Tennessee

=== 1998 ===
- Nicholas L. Abbott, University of California, Davis
- Nitash P. Balsara, Polytechnic University (New York)
- Stacey F. Bent, New York University
- Marcos Dantus, Michigan State University
- Jeffery T. Davis, University of Maryland, College Park
- P. Andrew Evans, University of Delaware
- Ellen Fisher, Colorado State University
- Clare P. Grey, Stony Brook University
- Martin Gruebele, University of Illinois at Urbana-Champaign
- Michael M. Haley, University of Oregon
- Paul E. Laibinis, Massachusetts Institute of Technology
- John Montgomery, Wayne State University
- Catherine J. Murphy, University of South Carolina
- Brooks Hart Pate, University of Virginia
- David A. Shultz, North Carolina State University
- Marc L. Snapper, Boston College
- Michael Tsapatsis, University of Massachusetts Amherst
- Keith A. Woerpel, University of California, Irvine
- John L. Wood, Yale University
- XuMu Zhang, The Pennsylvania State University

=== 1999 ===
- Scott M. Auerbach, University of Massachusetts Amherst
- Carolyn R. Bertozzi, University of California, Berkeley
- David E. Clemmer, Indiana University
- John T. Fourkas, Boston College
- C. Daniel Frisbie, University of Minnesota
- Randall L. Halcomb, University of Colorado Boulder
- Sharon Hammes-Schiffer, University of Notre Dame
- James E. Hutchison, University of Oregon
- Thomas Lectka, Johns Hopkins University
- Raul Lobo, University of Delaware
- Yi Lu, University of Illinois at Urbana-Champaign
- Dimitrios Maroudas, University of California, Santa Barbara
- Anne B. McCoy, Ohio State University
- Dominic V. McGrath, University of Arizona
- Amy S. Mullin, Boston University
- Andrew M. Rappe, University of Pennsylvania
- Daniel Romo, Texas A&M University
- Daniel K. Schwartz, Tulane University
- Yian Shi, Colorado State University
- Peng George Wang, Wayne State University

=== 2000 ===
- Kristi S. Anseth, University of Colorado Boulder
- Uwe H. F. Bunz, University of South Carolina
- Geoffrey W. Coates, Cornell University
- Timothy Deming, University of California, Santa Barbara
- Deborah G. Evans, University of New Mexico
- Michel R. Gagné, The University of North Carolina at Chapel Hill
- Hilary A. Godwin, Northwestern University
- Mark W. Grinstaff, Duke University
- Marc A. Hillmyer, University of Minnesota
- James L. Leighton, Columbia University
- Jeffrey R. Long, University of California, Berkeley
- Todd J. Martinez, University of Illinois at Urbana-Champaign
- Scott J. Miller, Boston College
- Milan Mrksich, The University of Chicago
- John P. Toscano, Johns Hopkins University
- Patrick J. Walsh, University of Pennsylvania
- Thomas J. Wandless, Stanford University
- James J. Watkins, University of Massachusetts Amherst

=== 2001 ===
- Philip Bevilacqua, The Pennsylvania State University
- Vicki Colvin, Rice University
- Jan Genzer, North Carolina State University
- David Y. Gin, University of Illinois at Urbana-Champaign
- Richard Hsung, University of Minnesota
- Wenbin Lin, Brandeis University
- Mark Lonergan, University of Oregon
- Benjamin Miller, University of Rochester
- Paul Nealey, University of Wisconsin-Madison
- John Peters, Utah State University
- Amy Rosenzweig, Northwestern University
- Benjamin Schwartz, University of California, Los Angeles
- Matthew Shair, Harvard University
- Erik Sorensen, The Scripps Research Institute
- Ross Widenhoefer, Duke University
- Olaf G. Wiest, University of Notre Dame

=== 2002 ===
- Annelise E. Barron, Northwestern University
- Peter A. Beal, The University of Utah
- Jillian Buriak, Purdue University
- Jeffrey D. Carbeck, Princeton University
- Hongjie Dai, Stanford University
- Michael W. Deem, University of California, Los Angeles
- Robert M. Dickson, Georgia Institute of Technology
- Theodore G. Goodson, Wayne State University
- Jonas C. Peters, California Institute of Technology
- David R. Reichman, Harvard University
- Dalibor Sames, Columbia University
- David S. Sholl, Carnegie Mellon University
- Mark E. Tuckerman, New York University
- Wilfred A. van der Donk, University of Illinois at Urbana-Champaign
- Younan Xia, University of Washington

=== 2003 ===
- Catalina Achim, Carnegie Mellon University
- Jianshu Cao, Massachusetts Institute of Technology
- Paul Cremer, Texas A&M University
- Michael J. Krische, University of Texas at Austin
- Kelvin H. Lee, Cornell University
- Christopher J. Lee, University of California, Los Angeles
- Louis A. Lyon, Georgia Institute of Technology
- David MacMillan, California Institute of Technology
- Vijay S. Pande, Stanford University
- Hongkun Park, Harvard University
- Floyd E. Romesberg, The Scripps Research Institute
- Shannon S. Stahl, University of Wisconsin–Madison
- Suzanne Walker, Princeton University

=== 2004 ===
- Justin Du Bois, Stanford University
- Pingyun Feng, University of California, Riverside
- Neil L. Kelleher, University of Illinois at Urbana-Champaign
- Sergey A. Kozmin, The University of Chicago
- David R. Liu, Harvard University
- Colin P. Nuckolls, Columbia University
- Blake R. Peterson, The Pennsylvania State University
- Andrei Sanov, University of Arizona
- Stanislav Shvartsman, Princeton University
- Matthew Sigman, The University of Utah
- Jennifer A. Swift, Georgetown University
- Nils G. Walter, University of Michigan
- Peidong Yang, University of California, Berkeley

=== 2005 ===
- Victor Batista, Yale University
- Kristie Boering, University of California, Berkeley
- Daniel Gamelin, University of Washington
- Brian R. Gibney, Columbia University
- Zhibin Guan, University of California, Irvine
- Jason M. Haugh, North Carolina State University
- Rustem F. Ismagilov, The University of Chicago
- Christine D. Keating, The Pennsylvania State University
- Shana O. Kelley, Boston College
- Todd D. Krauss, University of Rochester
- Yung-Ya Lin, University of California, Los Angeles
- Janis Louie, The University of Utah
- Daniel J. Mindiola, Indiana University
- Brian Stoltz, California Institute of Technology
- Marcus Weck, Georgia Institute of Technology
- Xiaowei Zhuang, Harvard University

=== 2006 ===
- Heather C. Allen, Ohio State University
- Paul Chirik, Cornell University
- Patrick S. Daugherty, University of California, Santa Barbara
- David H. Gracias, Johns Hopkins University
- Chuan He, The University of Chicago
- Paul J. Hergenrother, University of Illinois at Urbana-Champaign
- Yoshitaka Ishii, University of Illinois at Chicago
- Jeffrey S. Johnson, The University of North Carolina at Chapel Hill
- James T. Kindt, Emory University
- Carsten Krebs, The Pennsylvania State University
- Eric Meggers, University of Pennsylvania
- Dong-Kyun Seo, Arizona State University
- Alice Y. Ting, Massachusetts Institute of Technology
- Orlin D. Velev, North Carolina State University
- John P. Wolfe, University of Michigan

=== 2007 ===
- Helen Blackwell, University of Wisconsin–Madison
- Frank L. H. Brown, University of California, Santa Barbara
- Jeffrey M. Davis, University of Massachusetts Amherst
- Ivan J. Dmochowski, University of Pennsylvania
- Justin P. Gallivan, Emory University
- David S. Ginger, University of Washington
- Bartosz A. Grzybowski, Northwestern University
- Jeffrey D. Hartgerink, Rice University
- Efrosini Kokkoli, University of Minnesota
- Gavin MacBeath, Harvard University
- David A. Mazziotti, The University of Chicago
- Sergey Nizkorodov, University of California, Irvine
- Oleg V. Ozerov, Brandeis University
- Raymond Schaak, The Pennsylvania State University
- Michael Strano, Massachusetts Institute of Technology

=== 2008 ===
- Christopher Bielawski, University of Texas at Austin
- Garnet K.-L. Chan, Cornell University
- Olafs Daugulis, University of Houston
- Lincoln J. Lauhon, Northwestern University
- Mohammad Movassaghi, Massachusetts Institute of Technology
- Thuc-Quyen Nguyen, University of California, Santa Barbara
- Garegin Papoian, The University of North Carolina at Chapel Hill
- Theresa M. Reineke, Virginia Polytechnic Institute and State University
- Justine P. Roth, Johns Hopkins University
- Yi Tang, University of California, Los Angeles
- Victor M. Ugaz, Texas A&M University
- Qian Wang, University of South Carolina
- M. Christina White, University of Illinois at Urbana-Champaign
- Haw Yang, University of California, Berkeley
- Dongping Zhong, Ohio State University

=== 2009 ===
- Alán Aspuru-Guzik, Harvard University
- Xi Chen, University of California, Davis
- Katherine Franz, Duke University
- Christy Haynes, University of Minnesota
- Alan F. Heyduk, University of California, Irvine
- So Hirata, University of Florida
- Laura Kaufman, Columbia University
- Suljo Linic, University of Michigan
- Richmond Sarpong, University of California, Berkeley
- Shu-ou Shan, California Institute of Technology
- Jeremy M. Smith, New Mexico State University
- Todd M. Squires, University of California, Santa Barbara
- Abraham Stroock, Cornell University
- Paul Ryan Thompson, University of South Carolina

=== 2010 ===
- Kate Carroll, University of Michigan
- Matthew Disney, University at Buffalo
- Kevin Dorfman, University of Minnesota
- Amar Flood, Indiana University
- Jayne Garno, Louisiana State University
- Song-i Han, University of California, Santa Barbara
- Seogjoo Jang, Queens College, City University of New York
- Benjamin McCall, University of Illinois at Urbana-Champaign
- R. Mohan Sankaran, Case Western Reserve University
- Rachel A. Segalman, University of California, Berkeley
- Dmitri Talapin, The University of Chicago
- Edward Valeev, Virginia Polytechnic Institute and State University
- B. Jill Venton, University of Virginia
- Tehshik Yoon, University of Wisconsin–Madison

=== 2011 ===
- Christine Aikens, Kansas State University
- Ruben L. Gonzalez, Jr., Columbia University
- John Herbert, Ohio State University
- George Huber, University of Massachusetts Amherst
- Rongchao Jin, Carnegie Mellon University
- Kevin Kubarych, University of Michigan
- So-Jung Park, University of Pennsylvania
- Nathan Price, University of Illinois at Urbana-Champaign
- Tobias Ritter, Harvard University
- Herman Sintim, University of Maryland, College Park
- Charles H. Sykes, Tufts University
- Ting Xu, University of California, Berkeley
- Wei You, The University of North Carolina at Chapel Hill

=== 2012 ===
- Adam Cohen, Harvard University
- Greg Engel, The University of Chicago
- Joshua S. Figueroa, University of California, San Diego
- Seth B. Herzon, Yale University
- Christopher Jaroniec, Ohio State University
- Steven Little, University of Pittsburgh
- Shih-Yuan Liu, University of Oregon
- Christopher Love, Massachusetts Institute of Technology
- Dustin Maly, University of Washington
- Anne McNeil, University of Michigan
- Valeria Molinero, The University of Utah
- Celeste Nelson, Princeton University
- William Noid, The Pennsylvania State University
- Sarah Reisman, California Institute of Technology

=== 2013 ===
- Theodore A. Betley, Harvard University
- Michelle C. Chang, University of California, Berkeley
- William Dichtel, Cornell University
- Abigail Doyle, Princeton University
- Neil K. Garg, University of California, Los Angeles
- Thomas W. Hamann, Michigan State University
- Mandë Holford, Hunter College of the City University of New York
- Munira Khalil, University of Washington
- Stephen Maldonado, University of Michigan
- Thomas F. Miller, California Institute of Technology
- Baron G. Peters, University of California, Santa Barbara
- Charles M. Schroeder, University of Illinois at Urbana-Champaign
- Corey R. J. Stephenson, Boston University

=== 2014 ===
- Theodor Agapie, California Institute of Technology
- Hal Alper, University of Texas at Austin
- Paul Dauenhauer, University of Massachusetts Amherst
- Nilay Hazari, Yale University
- Ramesh Jasti, Boston University
- Matthew Kanan, Stanford University
- Elizabeth Nolan, Massachusetts Institute of Technology
- Rodney Priestley, Princeton University
- Khalid Salaita, Emory University
- Jordan Schmidt, University of Wisconsin–Madison
- Sara Skrabalak, Indiana University
- Adam Wasserman, Purdue University
- Emily Weiss, Northwestern University
- Daniel Weix, University of Rochester
- Michael Zdilla, Temple University

=== 2015 ===
- Emily Balskus, Harvard University
- Shannon W. Boettcher, University of Oregon
- Jennifer Dionne, Stanford University
- Joshua E. Goldberger, Ohio State University
- André Hoelz, California Institute of Technology
- Michael C. Jewett, Northwestern University
- Wei Min, Columbia University
- Douglas Mitchell, University of Illinois Urbana-Champaign
- David A. Nicewicz, The University of North Carolina at Chapel Hill
- Bradley D. Olsen, Massachusetts Institute of Technology
- Gary J. Patti, Washington University in St. Louis
- Jennifer A. Prescher, University of California, Irvine
- Joseph E. Subotnik, University of Pennsylvania

=== 2016 ===
- Andrew J. Boydston, University of Washington
- Luis M. Campos, Columbia University
- William C. Chueh, Stanford University
- Neal K. Devaraj, University of California, San Diego
- Mircea Dincă, Massachusetts Institute of Technology
- Naomi Ginsberg, University of California, Berkeley
- Aditya S. Khair, Carnegie Mellon University
- Jared C. Lewis, The University of Chicago
- Amanda J. Morris, Virginia Polytechnic Institute and State University
- Eranda Nikolla, Wayne State University
- Michael D. Pluth, University of Oregon
- Nathaniel K. Szymczak, University of Michigan
- Qiu Wang, Duke University

=== 2017 ===
- Chase L. Beisel, North Carolina State University
- Brandi Cossairt, University of Washington
- Jason M. Crawford, Yale University
- Aaron P. Esser-Kahn, University of California, Irvine
- Alison R. Fout, University of Illinois Urbana-Champaign
- Randall H. Goldsmith, University of Wisconsin–Madison
- Robert R. Knowles, Princeton University
- Julius B. Lucks, Northwestern University
- Thomas E. Markland, Stanford University
- Christian M. Metallo, University of California, San Diego
- Michelle O'Malley, University of California, Santa Barbara
- William A. Tisdale, Massachusetts Institute of Technology
- Guihua Yu, University of Texas at Austin

=== 2018 ===
- Alexander Barnes, Washington University in St. Louis
- Amie K. Boal, The Pennsylvania State University
- Abhishek Chatterjee, Boston College
- Irene A. Chen, University of California, Santa Barbara
- Francesco A. Evangelista, Emory University
- Danna Freedman, Northwestern University
- Catherine L. Grimes, University of Delaware
- John B. Matson, Virginia Polytechnic Institute and State University
- Kang-Kuen Ni, Harvard University
- Corinna S. Schindler, University of Michigan
- Mohammad R. Seyedsayamdost, Princeton University
- Mikhail G. Shapiro, California Institute of Technology
- Matthew D. Shoulders, Massachusetts Institute of Technology

=== 2019 ===
- Tianning Diao, New York University
- Bryan C. Dickinson, The University of Chicago
- Keary M. Engle, The Scripps Research Institute
- Renee R. Frontiera, University of Minnesota
- Garret M. Miyake, Colorado State University
- Timothy R. Newhouse, Yale University
- Amish J. Patel, University of Pennsylvania
- Dipali G. Sashital, Iowa State University
- Natalia Shustova, University of South Carolina
- Christopher Uyeda, Purdue University
- Timothy A. Wencewicz, Washington University in St. Louis
- Jenny Y. Yang, University of California, Irvine

=== 2020 ===
- Ou Chen, Brown University
- Emily R. Derbyshire, Duke University
- Frank A. Leibfarth, The University of North Carolina at Chapel Hill
- Ellen M. Matson, University of Rochester
- Evan W. Miller, University of California, Berkeley
- Katherine Mirica, Dartmouth College
- Gary F. Moore, Arizona State University
- Alison R. H. Narayan, University of Michigan
- Gabriela Schlau-Cohen, Massachusetts Institute of Technology
- Alexander M. Spokoyny, University of California, Los Angeles
- Steven D. Townsend, Vanderbilt University
- Suriyanarayanan Vaikuntanathan, The University of Chicago
- Christina Woo, Harvard University

=== 2021 ===
- John S. Anderson, The University of Chicago
- Carlos R. Baiz, The University of Texas at Austin
- Christopher M. Bates, University of California, Santa Barbara
- Osvaldo Gutierrez, University of Maryland, College Park
- Julia Kalow, Northwestern University
- Markita del Carpio Landry, University of California, Berkeley
- Song Lin, Cornell University
- Nikhil S. Malvankar, Yale University
- Karthish Manthiram, Massachusetts Institute of Technology
- David Olson, University of California, Davis
- Brenda Rubenstein, Brown University
- Ian B. Seiple, University of California, San Francisco
- Luisa Whittaker-Brooks, University of Utah
- Xiaoji Xu, Lehigh University
- Mingxu You, University of Massachusetts Amherst
- Joel Yuen-Zhou, University of California, San Diego

=== 2022 ===
- Justin Caram, University of California, Los Angeles
- Jefferson Chan, University of Illinois at Urbana-Champaign
- Sujit Datta, Princeton University
- Christopher Hendon, University of Oregon
- Lilian Hsiao, North Carolina State University
- Mark D. Levin, University of Chicago
- Weiyang (Fiona) Li, Dartmouth College
- Brian Liau, Harvard University
- Steven A. Lopez, Northeastern University
- Maxwell Robb, California Institute of Technology
- Sandeep Sharma (chemist), University of Colorado, Boulder
- Daniel Suess, Massachusetts Institute of Technology
- William Tarpeh, Stanford University
- Ashleigh Theberge, University of Washington
- V. Sara Thoi, Johns Hopkins University
- Jesús M. Velázquez, University of California, Davis
- Lauren Zarzar, The Pennsylvania State University
- Mingjiang Zhong, Yale University

== See also ==
- List of chemistry awards
