= Trenary =

Trenary is a surname. Notable people with the surname include:

- Cassandra Trenary (born 1993), American ballet dancer
- Jill Trenary (born 1968), American ice skater
- Michael Trenary, American chemist
- Philip Trenary (1954–2018), American businessman

== See also ==
- Trenary, unincorporated community; see Mathias Township, Michigan, United States
- Wilfred Trenery (1867–1905), South African rugby union player
