= Zarzar (surname) =

Zarzar is a surname originating in the Palestinian Christian community and its diaspora. Notable people with the surname include:

- Carlos Zarzar (born 1955), Chilean sports shooter
- Juan Antonio Carrera Zarzar (born 2004), Mexican and American soccer player, brother of Juan Nicolas
- Juan Nicolas Carrera Zarzar (born 2002), Mexican and American soccer player, brother of Juan Antonio
- Lauren Zarzar, American professor of chemistry and materials science
- Sergio Zarzar Andonie, Chilean professor of physical education and politician
