= Spokoyny =

Spokoyny (masculine), Spokoynaya (feminine), or Spokoynoye meaning peaceful in Russian may refer to:

- Spokoyny (settlement), a settlement in the Republic of Adygea, Russia
- Kotlin class destroyer (Project 56), or Project 56 Spokoyny, a cold-war era Soviet Navy destroyer
- Spokoynaya, a village (stanitsa) in Krasnodar Krai, Russia
- Spokoyny (volcano), a volcano in the Kamchatka peninsula, Russia
- Alexander M. Spokoyny, American chemist
- Mikhail Spokoyny (born 1955), Russian-American engineer
