= Rotello (surname) =

Rotello is a surname. Notable people with the surname include:

- Gabriel Rotello (born 1953), American activist and writer
- Michael V. Rotello (born 1952), American politician
- Vincent Rotello, American materials scientist and engineer

== See also ==
- Rotelli
