= Lineberger =

Lineberger is a surname. Notable people with the surname include:

- Paul Myron Anthony Linebarger (1913–1966), known as Cordwainer Smith, American author
- Walter F. Lineberger (1883–1943), American politician
- William Carl Lineberger (born 1939), American chemist
