= Amy Mullin =

American chemist

Amy S. Mullin
- Scientific career
- Fields: Physical Chemistry
- Workplaces: University of Maryland, College Park
- Doctoral advisor: W. Carl Lineberger
- Website: Amy Mullin

Amy S. Mullin is an American chemist and professor at the University of Maryland. She is a member of the American Physical Society, along with the American Association for the Advancement of Science and the Optical Society of America. Her research focuses on molecular dynamics. Since joining the faculty at UMD, Mullin has developed new graduate courses in kinetics and dynamics and created new methods for teaching physical chemistry courses.

== Education ==
Amy S. Mullin has a B.A. in chemistry from University of California, Santa Cruz (1985) and a Ph.D. in physical chemistry from the University of Colorado, Boulder (in 1991 with W. Carl Lineberger). She was an AAUW American Postdoctoral Fellow at Columbia University, working with George W. Flynn (1992–1994).

== Research ==
Mullin uses time-resolved laser spectroscopy to investigate how energy is used in chemical processes and molecular collisions. This includes transient spectroscopy of collisions, where molecules are excited to very high energy states with pulsed lasers, and studied with time-resolved high-resolution optical absorption in order to investigate the relationship between molecular structure and collision dynamics; driving chemical reactions with vibrational energy, where high-resolution optical probing is used to investigate how chemical reactions are affected by large amounts of vibrational energy of the reacting molecules at a quantum-state resolved level; and spinning molecules into reactive states, using ultrafast lasers to investigate molecules in the presence of strong fields applied in short pulses of time. Mullin developed a high-power optical centrifuge to generate molecules in high rotational angular momentum states in order to investigate the chemistry and dynamics of rotationally activated molecules. The optical centrifuge work is primarily focused on studying "rotationally-induced dissociation and isomerization and the coupling of vibrational and rotational degrees of freedom in high energy states".

== Awards ==
- Fellow of the Optical Society of America (2018)
- Creative Educator Award, College of Computer, Mathematical and Natural Science (2011)
- Fellow of the American Physical Society (2009)
- General Research Board Semester Award (2008) from the University of Maryland
- Elected Fellow of the American Association for the Advancement of Science (2006)
- Camille Dreyfus Teacher Scholar Award (1999)
- American Young Leader of the American Swiss Foundation (1998)
- National Science Foundation CAREER Award (1996)
- Office of Naval Research Young Investigator Award (1996)
- Clare Boothe Luce Professorship (1994)
- American Association of University Women Postdoctoral Fellow (1993)
- Elected to Sigma Xi (1991)
