= Alison R. Fout =

American inorganic chemist

- Education: B.S. – Gannon College, 1998 – 2002; M.S. – University of North Carolina, Charlotte, 2002–2004; Ph.D. – Indiana University Bloomington, 2006 – 2009; Postdoctoral Fellow – Harvard University, 2010 – 2012
- Awards: Alfred P. Sloan Fellowship; 2014 NSF CAREER award; 2015 Camille and Henry Dreyfus Teacher-Scholar
- Scientific career
- Fields: Synthetic Inorganic and Organometallic Chemistry
- Workplaces: Texas A&M University, University of Illinois Urbana-Champaign
- Thesis: (2009)
- Doctoral advisor: Daniel J. Mindiola
- Other academic advisors: Daniel Rabinowich (M.S.); Theodore Betley (Post-Doc)
- Website: foutgroup.squarespace.com

Alison R. Fout is an American inorganic chemist at the Texas A&M University where she holds the rank of professor. She has contributed to the discovery of new catalysts with NHC ligands. She discovered a family of catalysts that reduce oxyanions such as nitrate, perchlorate to nitric oxide and chloride, respectively.

== Recognition ==
As an independent investigator, she received the following recognition:

- 2017 Camille and Henry Dreyfus Teacher Scholar Award
- 2016–2021 U. S. Department of Energy Early Career Research Program
- 2015 Marion Milligan Mason Award for Women in the Chemical Sciences, AAAS
- 2015 Sloan Research Fellowship
- 2014 National Science Foundation CAREER Awards

She also was recognized from scientific journals. In 2016, she received recognition as New Talent Americas from Dalton Transactions. That same year, the American Chemical Society awarded her as an Emerging Investigator in Bioinorganic Chemistry. In 2019 she received the Thieme Chemistry Journals Award. In 2017 she presented the Dalton Lectures at the University of California, Berkeley. At the 2018 Metals in Biology Gordon Conference, she received the Ed Stiefel Young Investigator Award.
