= Christopher Jaroniec =

Christopher Jaroniec is an American professor of analytical, physical, chemical physics and biochemistry.

== Education ==
He obtained his Bachelor of Science degree in chemistry from Kent State University in 1997 and six years got his Ph.D. in physical chemistry from the Massachusetts Institute of Technology. He is graduate research fellow of National Science Foundation and is Damon Runyon Cancer Research Foundation postdoc fellow.

== Career ==
In 2006, Jaroniec became an assistant professor at the Ohio State University and by 2014 became a full professor.

Currently he works at Evans Laboratory where he was also named Evans Scholar and is a recipient of such awards as the Eli Lilly Young Investigator Award for his analytical chemistry research and Camille Dreyfus Teacher-Scholar Award. In 2007, he was awarded New Investigator Research Grant Award from the Alzheimer's Association and an undergraduate award in 1996 from the American Chemical Society. In 1994, he was awarded freshman award from CRC Press of Kent State University and the same year became a recipient of the Merck Award from the same place. He also has over 2,200 citations of his numerous peer reviewed articles which were published in such journals as Biochemistry, Proceedings of the National Academy of Sciences of the United States of America and many others with an h-index of 37.
