= Paul Nealey =

American molecular engineer

Paul Franklin Nealey is an American molecular engineer.

Nealey studied chemical engineering at Rice University, then earned a doctorate in the subject from the Massachusetts Institute of Technology. He undertook postdoctoral research at Harvard University before working for Solvay et Compagnie in Brussels. During his teaching career at University of Wisconsin–Madison, Nealey received the National Science Foundation Career Award in 1997, a Camille Dreyfus Teacher-Scholar Award in 2001, and was subsequently named Shoemaker Professor of Chemical and Biological Engineering. He was granted fellowship in the American Physical Society in 2008 "[f]or fundamental and insightful research on the dimension dependent properties of polymer nanostructures, the directed self-assembly of block copolymers, and their application in the development of advanced lithographic materials and processes." Nealey later joined the University of Chicago as the Brady W. Dougan Professor in Molecular Engineering, and also accepted a joint appointment to the Argonne National Laboratory's Material Science Division. In 2018, Nealey was named a member of the National Academy of Engineering "[f]or the development of directed self-assembly of block copolymers as an industrially significant process for nanolithography."
