= Luisa Whittaker-Brooks =

American chemist

- Born: Panama
- Education: State University of New York at Buffalo; University of Panama
- Scientific career
- Workplaces: University of Utah; Princeton University
- Thesis: Synthesis, characterization and phase transitions of single-crystalline vanadium(IV) oxide nanostructures (2011)

Luisa Whittaker-Brooks is an American chemist who is a full professor at the University of Utah. She was named a L'Oréal-UNESCO For Women in Science honouree in 2013 and one of Chemical & Engineering News' Talented 12 in 2017.

== Early life and education ==
Whittaker grew up in Panama. As a child, she became interested in the hydroelectric dams that powered Panama. She started to think about alternative sources of energy. Whittaker earned her bachelor's degree at the University of Panama, where she studied analytical chemistry. She moved to the United States for her graduate studies, where she joined the University at Buffalo as a Fulbright Program fellow. There she completed her master's and doctoral degrees within three and a half years. For her doctoral research Whittaker studied vanadium oxide. Vanadium oxide is opaque when hot and transparent when cold, and Whittaker wondered whether it could be used to coat windows and keep buildings cool. Throughout her doctoral research she worked to lower the transition temperature that this phase change occurs at, and eventually commercialised her technology. Whittaker-Brooks worked as a postdoctoral scholar with Yueh-Lin Loo, where she used low-temperature hydrothermal methods to study zinc oxide nanostructures.

== Research and career ==
Whittaker studies novel photovoltaic and thermoelectric materials for energy generation and storage. She is particularly interested in chalcogenides and perovskites and how their composition and structure impacts their electronic properties. Whittaker has researched how bias stress and sample heterogeneity impact the performance and operational lifetime of organic-inorganic halide perovskites (OIHPs). She has also studied the role of excitons in their operational stability and impact of moisture and oxygen. In 2019 she was elected to the advisory board of ChemNanoMat.

== Awards and honours ==
- 2007 Fulbright Program Fellow
- 2013 L'Oréal-UNESCO For Women in Science Awards
- 2015 American Association for the Advancement of Science Milligan Mason Award for Women in the Chemical Sciences
- 2017 Chemical & Engineering News' Talented 12
- 2017 National Organization for the Professional Advancement of Black Chemists and Chemical Engineers Lloyd N. Ferguson Young Scientist Award for Excellence in Research
- 2017 American Physical Society Ovshinsky Sustainable Energy Fellow
- 2018 Journal of Materials Chemistry A Emerging Leader
- 2021 Camille Dreyfus Teacher Scholar Award

== Selected publications ==
- Lee, Vincent; Whittaker, Luisa; Jaye, Cherno; Baroudi, Kristen M.; Fischer, Daniel A.; Banerjee, Sarbajit (2009-08-25). "Large-Area Chemically Modified Graphene Films: Electrophoretic Deposition and Characterization by Soft X-ray Absorption Spectroscopy". Chemistry of Materials. 21 (16): 3905–3916. doi:10.1021/cm901554p. ISSN 0897-4756.
- Whittaker, Luisa; Jaye, Cherno; Fu, Zugen; Fischer, Daniel A.; Banerjee, Sarbajit (2009-07-01). "Depressed Phase Transition in Solution-Grown VO2 Nanostructures". Journal of the American Chemical Society. 131 (25): 8884–8894. Bibcode:2009JAChS.131.8884W. doi:10.1021/ja902054w. ISSN 0002-7863. PMID 19505072.
- Whittaker, Luisa; Patridge, Christopher J.; Banerjee, Sarbajit (2011-04-07). "Microscopic and Nanoscale Perspective of the Metal−Insulator Phase Transitions of VO2: Some New Twists to an Old Tale". The Journal of Physical Chemistry Letters. 2 (7): 745–758. doi:10.1021/jz101640n.
