= Rotelli =

Rotelli is an Italian surname. Notable people with the surname include:

- Chris Rotelli (born 1979), American professional lacrosse player
- Luigi Rotelli (1833–1891), Italian cardinal

== See also ==
- Rotelle
- Rotello (surname)
