= Laura Kaufman =

American chemist

Laura Jill Kaufman
- Education: Columbia University; University of California, Berkeley
- Scientific career
- Workplaces: Harvard University; Columbia University
- Thesis: Fifth-order nonresonant Raman spectroscopy (2002)
- Doctoral advisor: Graham Fleming

Laura Jill Kaufman is an American chemist who is a professor of chemistry at Columbia University. Her research considers the dynamics of crowded systems, including biopolymer gels, supercooled liquids and conjugated polymers.

== Early life and education ==
Kaufman grew up in Bergen County, New Jersey. Her father worked as a postal clerk and her mother taught in a public school. In 1997 Kaufman graduated from Columbia University, where she majored in Chemistry and English. As an undergraduate student Kaufman was selected for the I.I. Rabi Scholars programme, and took part in various different research projects. She has said that this experience was transformative in becoming a scientist. She moved to University of California, Berkeley for her graduate studies, where she worked on multi-dimensional Raman spectroscopy. She worked in the laboratory of Graham Fleming on carbon disulfide. Her research looks at how diffusive dynamics emerge from fluctuations of individual molecules. After finishing her doctoral research, Kaufman moved to Harvard University, where she joined Xiaoliang Sunney Xie and used Coherent Anti-Stokes Raman spectroscopy (CARS) microscopy to investigate colloidal glasses.

== Research and career ==
Kaufman joined the Chemistry faculty at Columbia University in 2004. Her research considers the dynamics of crowded, complex systems, including supercooled liquids and polymer aggregates studied by single-molecule fluorescence microscopy. In supercooled liquids, single molecule fluorophores provide information on the surrounding host. Kaufman has shown that conjugated polymers with a compact conformation have different photophysical properties than those with an extended backbone.

== Awards and honors ==
- 2005 NYSTAR Young Investigator Award
- 2006 Beckman Young Investigators Award
- 2009 The Camille and Henry Dreyfus Foundation Camille Dreyfus Teacher-Scholar Award

== Selected publications ==
- Ju Young Lee; Byung Hee Hong; Woo Youn Kim; et al. (July 2009). "Near-field focusing and magnification through self-assembled nanoscale spherical lenses". Nature. 460 (7254): 498–501. Bibcode:2009Natur.460..498L. doi:10.1038/nature08173. ISSN 1476-4687. Wikidata Q57942759.
- L.J. Kaufman; C.P. Brangwynne; K.E. Kasza; E. Filippidi; V.D. Gordon; T.S. Deisboeck; D A Weitz (22 April 2005). "Glioma expansion in collagen I matrices: analyzing collagen concentration-dependent growth and motility patterns". Biophysical Journal. 89 (1): 635–650. Bibcode:2005BpJ....89..635K. doi:10.1529/biophysj.105.061994. ISSN 0006-3495. PMC 1366562. PMID 15849239. Wikidata Q30476738.
- Cheng Guo; Laura J. Kaufman (16 November 2006). "Flow and magnetic field induced collagen alignment". Biomaterials. 28 (6): 1105–1114. doi:10.1016/j.biomaterials.2006.10.010. ISSN 0142-9612. PMID 17112582. Wikidata Q59289238.

== Personal life ==
Kaufman is married to David Reichman, the Centennial Professor of Chemistry at Columbia University. They have two children.
