= Katherine Mirica =

American chemist

Katherine A. Mirica
- Education: Harvard University Ph.D. (2011); Boston College B.S. (2004)
- Scientific career
- Workplaces: Massachusetts Institute of Technology; Dartmouth College
- Thesis: Density-based chemical analysis and three dimensional self-assembly using magnetic levitation (2011)
- Doctoral advisor: George M. Whitesides
- Other academic advisors: Lawrence T. Scott, Timothy M. Swager

Katherine A. Mirica is an American chemist who is an associate professor at Dartmouth College. Her research considers materials chemistry, with a particular focus on environmental science and microelectronics.

== Early life and education ==
Mirica was born in Eastern Ukraine. She moved to Rhode Island whilst at high school. Mirica was an undergraduate at Boston College, where she majored in chemistry and worked alongside Prof. Lawrence T. Scott. She was awarded the Matthew Copithorne Scholarship and the Scholar of the College Award. After graduating with her B.S. in chemistry in 2004, Mirica moved to Harvard University for her graduate studies, where she worked with Prof. George M. Whitesides to investigate three-dimensional self-assembly using magnetic levitation. Together they worked on paper-based diagnostics and protein biophysics. After earning her doctorate, Mirica joined the laboratory of Timothy M. Swager at Massachusetts Institute of Technology as an National Institutes of Health Research Fellow. Her work at MIT considered solvent-free portable electronic carbon-based chemical sensors.

== Research and career ==
Mirica was appointed to the faculty at Dartmouth College in 2015. She studies self-assembly and multifunctional framework materials. Amongst the materials developed by Mirica, two-dimensional conductive metal-organic frameworks hold promise for electroanalysis.

== Awards and honors ==
- 2018 Thieme Chemistry Journals Award
- 2018 Sloan Research Fellowship
- 2019 Cottrell Scholar Award
- 2020 Camille Dreyfus Teacher-Scholar Award
- 2020 National Science Foundation CAREER Award
- 2020 NIH Maximizing Investigators' Research Award
- 2021 Karen E. Wetterhahn Memorial Award for Distinguished Creative or Scholarly Achievement
- 2022 Wetterhahn Science Symposium Keynote Speaker

== Selected publications ==
- Chao-Min Cheng; Andres W Martinez; Jinlong Gong; Charles R Mace; Scott T Phillips; Emanuel Carrilho; Katherine A Mirica; George M Whitesides (1 June 2010). "Paper-based ELISA". Angewandte Chemie International Edition. 49 (28): 4771–4774. doi:10.1002/anie.201001005. ISSN 1433-7851. PMID 20512830. Wikidata Q44473084.
- Audrey K Ellerbee; Scott T Phillips; Adam C Siegel; et al. (1 October 2009). "Quantifying colorimetric assays in paper-based microfluidic devices by measuring the transmission of light through paper". Analytical Chemistry. 81 (20): 8447–8452. doi:10.1021/ac901307q. ISSN 0003-2700. PMID 19722495. Wikidata Q84503907.
- Sarah J Vella; Patrick Beattie; Rebecca Cademartiri; Anna Laromaine; Andres W Martinez; Scott T Phillips; Katherine A Mirica; George M Whitesides (2 March 2012). "Measuring markers of liver function using a micropatterned paper device designed for blood from a fingerstick". Analytical Chemistry. 84 (6): 2883–2891. doi:10.1021/ac203434x. ISSN 0003-2700. PMC 3320108. PMID 22390675. Wikidata Q41833651.
