= Christopher Bielawski =

Professor at Ulsan National Institute of Science and Technology

Christopher W. Bielawski
- Born: December 13, 1973; Berwyn, Illinois
- Education: California Institute of Technology, University of Illinois at Urbana–Champaign
- Awards: Clarivate Analytics Highly Cited Researcher, Alfred P. Sloan Research Fellowship, PECASE
- Scientific career
- Fields: Polymer chemistry, organic materials, organometallic materials, synthesis
- Workplaces: UNIST, Institute for Basic Science
- Thesis: Tailoring polymer synthesis with designer ruthenium catalysts (2003)
- Academic advisors: Robert H. Grubbs, David A. Tirrell, Jeffrey S. Moore
- Website: http://bielawski.unist.ac.kr

Christopher William Bielawski is a distinguished professor at Ulsan National Institute of Science and Technology and group leader of the Synthesis Group in the Center for Multidimensional Carbon Materials. His research in synthesis and polymer chemistry has resulted in more than 290 publications and multiple patents.

He is a member of the American Chemical Society, an honorary lifetime member of the Israeli Chemical Society, and has on the Editorial Advisory Boards at Chemical Science, Polymer Chemistry, Macromolecules and an associate editor at Chemical Science.

== Education ==
Christopher majored in chemistry at the University of Illinois at Urbana-Champaign and worked with supramolecular systems as an undergraduate researcher for Prof. Jeffrey S. Moore. He graduated Magna Cum Laude with Highest Distinction in 1997. He then enrolled in the chemistry graduate studies program of the California Institute of Technology. Working under Prof. Robert H. Grubbs as an NSF predoctoral fellow, he integrated olefin metathesis and tandem catalysis in the development of synthetic routes to polymeric materials and complex small molecules before completing his completed his PhD in chemistry in 2003.

== Career ==
Staying at Caltech, he worked as an NIH postdoctoral fellow in the laboratories of Prof. David A. Tirrell. He next became an assistant professor of chemistry at the University of Texas at Austin in 2004, an associate professor in 2009, and a full professor in 2010.

He became a World Class University Professor in Seoul National University in 2012 and a distinguished professor at UNIST in 2013 when UNIST and the Institute for Basic Science opened the Center for Multidimensional Carbon Materials. The Center was opened as part of reorganization efforts by UNIST to expand their basic science research.

== Honors and awards ==
- 2018: Clarivate Analytics (Thomson Reuters) Highly Cited Researcher
- 2016: Most Cited Researchers in Materials Science and Engineering
- 2014: Fellow of the Royal Society of Chemistry
- 2012: Journal of Polymer Science Innovation Award, American Chemical Society
- 2011: Member of the American Nano Society
- 2011: Defense Science Study Group
- 2010: IUPAC-Samsung Young Polymer Scientist Award
- 2010: Presidential Early Career Award for Scientists and Engineers (PECASE)
- 2009: Journal of Physical Organic Chemistry Award for Early Excellence in Physical Organic Chemistry
- 2008: Camille Dreyfus Teacher-Scholar Award
- 2008: Alfred P. Sloan Research Fellowship
- 2007: Beckman Young Investigators Award
- 2003: Henkel Award
- 2000: Fellowship, American Chemical Society, Division of Organic Chemistry
- 1996: Member of the American Chemical Society
- Honorary Lifetime Member of the Israeli Chemical Society
