= Steven D. Townsend =

American chemist

- Born: Detroit
- Education: Vanderbilt University; Oakland University; Martin Luther King High School
- Scientific career
- Workplaces: Vanderbilt University
- Thesis: Studies Toward the Total Synthesis of Bielschowskysin (2010)
- Doctoral advisor: Gary A. Sulikowski

Steven D'Wayne Townsend is a professor of organic chemistry at Vanderbilt University. He investigates the chemistry of human breast milk. In 2019 Townsend was selected as one of Chemical & Engineering News Talented 12.

== Early life and education ==
Steve Townsend was born in Detroit in 1983. He graduated from Martin Luther King High School in 2001 before starting an undergraduate degree in chemistry at Oakland University. At Oakland he was a Keeper of the Dream scholar and worked with Amanda Bryant-Friedrich, a toxicologist. He completed his bachelor's degree in 2005 and was awarded the American Chemical Society Outstanding Graduating Senior Award and the Alfred G Wilson Founders Medal - an award that recognizes a senior who has given significant contributions as a scholar, a leader, and a responsible citizen of the institution. In 2005, he matriculated to Vanderbilt University, joining the laboratory of Gary Sulikowski. He was supported by predoctoral fellowships from the United Negro College Fund and Pfizer. After completing his doctoral education at Vanderbilt, he completed a postdoctoral research fellowship with Samuel J. Danishefsky at Memorial Sloan-Kettering Cancer Center and Columbia University. He is an initiated member of Phi Beta Sigma, a predominantly African American Fraternity founded in 1914.

== Research and career ==
Steve joined Columbia University as a postdoctoral scholar, working in the laboratory of Samuel Danishefsky. Whilst living in New York he noticed that in wealthy neighbourhoods there were adverts for breastfeeding, whilst in poor neighbourhoods there were adverts for formula. He became interested in women's health disparities and the science of human breast milk. He started to investigate milk sugars (Human Milk Oligosaccharides, HMOs) and identified that they help infants fight disease. HMOs are prebiotics and help to promote colonisation of the intestine with good bacteria. Townsend was the first to show that HMOs prevent the formation of group B streptococcus and that they can even exert antimicrobial activity. He was awarded the Ruth A. Lawrence Investigator Award for his work in human milk science.

Since Townsend's observation that oligosaccharides were crucial for antibacterial defence and to support infection-fighting proteins the oligosaccharide 2′-fucosyllactose has been included in a number of products. Townsend went on to show that whilst 2′-fucosyllactose is in the breast milk of the majority of white women, black and Latina women do not necessarily produce the sugar. Townsend is investigating how the balance of HMOs impacts an infant's microbiome.

Townsend was appointed an independent researcher at Vanderbilt University in 2014. He was awarded the Chancellor's Research Award in 2018 and made a Dean's Faculty Fellow in 2019.

=== Awards and honours ===
- 2005 Alfred G. Wilson Founders Medal
- 2018 Ruth A. Lawrence Investigator Award
- 2018 Jeffrey Nordhaus Award for Excellence in Undergraduate Education
- 2018 Chancellor's Award for Research
- 2019 Dean's Faculty Fellow
- 2019 National Science Foundation CAREER Award
- 2019 American Chemical Society Young Investigators Award
- 2019 Chemical & Engineering News Talented 12
- 2020 Camille and Henry Dreyfus Foundation Camille Dreyfus Teacher-Scholar Award
- 2021 Alfred P. Sloan Foundation Alfred P. Sloan Research Fellow
- 2025 Presidential Early Career Award for Scientists and Engineers
