= Christine D. Keating =

American chemist and academic

Christine Dolan Keating
- Education: Pennsylvania State University
- Scientific career
- Workplaces: Pennsylvania State University; Saint Francis University
- Thesis: Metal nanoparticles for biological spectroscopy : control of particle organization and surface chemistry (1997)
- Website: Keating Research Group

Christine D. Keating is an American scientist who is the Shapiro Professor of Chemistry at Pennsylvania State University. Her research involves colloid and interface chemistry for biology and materials science.

== Early life and education ==
Keating studied biology and chemistry at Saint Francis University. She moved to Pennsylvania State University for her doctorate. She was made a postdoctoral researcher in Penn State in 1997.

== Research and career ==
In 1999, Keating became assistant professor and she was promoted to associate professor in 2007. Keating specializes in colloids and interfaces in chemistry, materials and biology. She builds artificial cells and uses liquid-liquid phase separation and molecular self-assembly. She is interested in the structure-function properties of biomolecular materials. Her research looks to inform the design of pharmaceuticals and bioinspired materials.

Keating is interested in the assembly of nonbiological materials (e.g. metallic nanospheres and nanowires). Organization in these systems arises due to the inter- and intra-particle interactions. Control of molecular packing at the nano- and micro-scale can impart new functionalities to materials, which can be used in sensors and optoelectronic components.

== Awards and honors ==
- 2003 National Science Foundation CAREER Award
- 2004 Alfred P. Sloan Research Fellow
- 2004 Unilever Award for Outstanding Young Investigator in Colloid and Surfactant Science
- 2004 Beckman Young Investigators Award
- 2005 Camille Dreyfus Teacher-Scholar Award
- 2014 Elected Fellow of the American Association for the Advancement of Science
- 2017 Penn State Faculty Scholar Medal in Life and Health Sciences

== Selected publications ==
- Sheila R. Nicewarner-Peña; R. Griffith Freeman; Brian D. Reiss; et al. (1 October 2001). "Submicrometer metallic barcodes". Science. 294 (5540): 137–141. Bibcode:2001Sci...294..137N. doi:10.1126/science.294.5540.137. ISSN 0036-8075. PMID 11588257. Wikidata Q74596159.
- Lin He; Michael D. Musick; Sheila R. Nicewarner; Frank G. Salinas; Stephen J. Benkovic; Michael J. Natan; Christine D. Keating (September 2000). "Colloidal Au-Enhanced Surface Plasmon Resonance for Ultrasensitive Detection of DNA Hybridization". Journal of the American Chemical Society. 122 (38): 9071–9077. doi:10.1021/ja001215b. ISSN 0002-7863. Wikidata Q56443606.
- Shawn P. Mulvaney; Michael D. Musick; Christine D. Keating; Michael J. Natan (May 2003). "Glass-Coated, Analyte-Tagged Nanoparticles: A New Tagging System Based on Detection with Surface-Enhanced Raman Scattering". Langmuir. 19 (11): 4784–4790. doi:10.1021/la026706j. ISSN 0743-7463. Wikidata Q61068290.
