= Jill Venton =

American chemist

B. Jill Venton
- Education: University of Delaware University of North Carolina at Chapel Hill
- Scientific career
- Fields: Analytical Chemistry
- Workplaces: University of Virginia
- Thesis: Electrochemical detection of chemical dynamics in the rat brain (2003)
- Doctoral advisor: Mark Wightman
- Other academic advisors: Robert Kennedy (postdoctoral) Terry Robinson (postdoctoral)
- Website: https://uva.theopenscholar.com/venton-group/jill-venton

B. Jill Venton is a professor of chemistry at University of Virginia, where she serves as the department chair since 2019. Venton's research focuses on developing analytical chemistry methods to enable detection of molecules in the brain.

== Education ==
Venton received her BS in Chemistry from University of Delaware in 1998 and her PhD in Chemistry from University of North Carolina, Chapel Hill in 2003. She was an NIH postdoctoral fellow at University of Michigan from 2003 to 2005.

== Research ==
Venton joined the Department of Chemistry at University of Virginia as an assistant professor in 2005, received tenure and was promoted to an associate professor in 2011, and was promoted to full professor in 2016. Venton develops analytical tools such as carbon-fiber microelectrodes for sensing molecules in the brain to achieve real-time monitoring of neurotransmitters to help understand the brain functions both under normal physiological conditions and in neurological disorders.

== Awards and honors ==
- National Science Foundation Career Award, 2007–2012
- Meade Endowment Honored Faculty, 2007–2008
- Eli Lilly Young Analytical Investigator Award, 2007
- American Chemical Society PROGRESS/Dreyfus Foundation Lectureship, 2008
- Camille Dreyfus Teacher-Scholar, 2010
- Society for Electroanalytical Chemistry, Young Investigator Award, 2011
- President Elect, International Society of Monitoring Molecules in vivo, 2018–2022
- Distinguished Researcher Award, American Chemical Society Virginia Section, 2020

== Selected publications ==
B E Kumara Swamy; Venton, B. (2007). "Carbon nanotube-modified microelectrodes for simultaneous detection of dopamine and serotonin in vivo". Analyst. 132 (9): 876–884. doi:10.1039/b705552h. PMID 17710262. Wikidata Q30444306.

Cheng Yang; Madelaine E Denno; Poojan Pyakurel; Venton, B. (2015). "Recent trends in carbon nanomaterial-based electrochemical sensors for biomolecules: A review". Analytica Chimica Acta. 887: 17–37. doi:10.1016/j.aca.2015.05.049. PMC 4557208. PMID 26320782. Wikidata Q26796285.

Venton, B.; Qun Cao (2020). "Fundamentals of fast-scan cyclic voltammetry for dopamine detection". Analyst. 145 (4): 1158–1168. doi:10.1039/c9an01586h. PMID 31922176. Wikidata Q92545235.

Qun Cao; Mimi Shin; Nickolay V Lavrik; B Jill Venton (2020). "3D-Printed Carbon Nanoelectrodes for In Vivo Neurotransmitter Sensing". Nano Letters. doi:10.1021/acs.nanolett.0c02844. PMID 32813535. Wikidata Q98566988.

Mimi Shin; Jeffrey M Copeland; Venton, B. (2020). "Real-Time Measurement of Stimulated Dopamine Release in Compartments of the Adult Drosophila melanogaster Mushroom Body". Analytical Chemistry. doi:10.1021/acs.analchem.0c02305. PMID 33048531. Wikidata Q100529135.
