= Robert G. Bryant =

Chemist

- Citizenship: American

Robert George Bryant is an American scientist and a professor of chemistry at the University of Virginia. His research focuses on magnetic relaxation dispersion studies, and is primarily supported by grants from the National Institute of Health.

== Research ==
A primary focus of the research in the Bryant laboratory is of information obtainable from the magnetic relaxation dispersions (MRD) or from the magnetic field dependence of the nuclear spin-lattice relaxation rate as a function of the magnetic field strength. The unique instrumentation, constructed in the Bryant Lab, permits acquisition of MRD profiles for a variety of nuclear resonances in high resolution. The collected MRD profiles report relative inter and intramolecular motions over the time range from about ten microseconds to one picosecond. The measurements are sensitive to relatively weak intermolecular interactions and permit definition of highly localized intermolecular free energy differences in solutions. Multinuclear studies of proteins in a number of dynamical environments provide a fundamental characterization of how the protein structure fluctuates in time and how energy is redistributed in the folded structure. The practical implications range from understanding protein catalytic function to developing new techniques for diagnostic medicine in the context of magnetic resonance imaging or MRI.

== Education ==
A.B. Colgate University, 1965
Ph.D. Stanford University, 1969

== Awards and honors ==
2009 Robert G. Bryant was named fellows by the American Association for the Advancement of Science.
