= Ming-Daw Tsai =

Taiwanese chemist

Ming-Daw Tsai (Chinese: 蔡明道) is a Taiwanese chemist.

Tsai earned a Bachelor of Science in chemistry at National Taiwan University in 1972, and moved to the United States to continue studying in the same field, completing a PhD in 1978 at Purdue University, under the direction of Heinz G. Floss. Tsai began teaching at Ohio State University in 1981, advanced through several roles, including Kimberly Professor of Chemistry, and retired with emeritus status in 2007. He has been affiliated with Academia Sinica since 2003.

In 1992, Tsai was elected a fellow of the American Association for the Advancement of Science. In 2012, he was elected a member of Academia Sinica. Two years later, Tsai was elected a fellow of The World Academy of Sciences.
