= Michelle O'Malley =

American chemical engineer

Professor Michelle O'Malley Ph.D.
- Education: Carnegie Mellon University
- Scientific career
- Workplaces: University of California, Santa Barbara

Michelle O'Malley is an American chemical engineer and professor at the University of California, Santa Barbara. She is known for her work studying the use of anaerobic microbes in developing inexpensive biofuels. In 2015 she was named as one of MIT Technology Review's 35 Innovators under 35, and in 2016 she received the Presidential Early Career Award for Scientists and Engineers.

== Early life and education ==
O'Malley received a B.S. in chemical and biomedical engineering from Carnegie Mellon University in 2004. She earned her doctor of philosophy in chemical engineering at the University of Delaware in 2009, working with Anne Robinson expressing membrane proteins in yeast.

== Career ==
O’Malley received a USDA-NIFA postdoctoral fellowship to perform biofuel research at MIT. In 2012 she joined the faculty at the University of California, Santa Barbara as an assistant professor. O'Malley's research focuses on discovering, isolating, and characterizing cellulose-digesting fungi in the guts of herbivores. Enzymes from these fungi can be used to break down biomass (such as grasses) into simple sugars, which can be further fermented into biofuels. Her research has been featured on NPR's Science Friday, as well as in Forbes and Mother Jones magazines, and she has been interviewed for two Science Career stories.

== Awards ==
- 2015 MIT Technology Review, 35 Innovators Under 35
- 2016 Presidential Early Career Award for Scientists and Engineers
- 2016 Colburn Lecturer, Dept. of Chemical and Biomolecular Engineering, University of Delaware
- 2016 National Science Foundation CAREER Award
- 2017 Camille Dreyfus Teacher-Scholar Award
- 2018 American Chemical Society Biochemical Technology Division Young Investigator Award

== Selected publications ==
- Kevin V. Solomon, Charles H. Haitjema, John K. Henske, Sean P. Gilmore, Diego Borges-Rivera, Anna Lipzen, Heather M. Brewer, Samuel O. Purvine, Aaron T. Wright, Michael K. Theodorou, Igor V. Grigoriev, Aviv Regev, Dawn A. Thompson, Michelle A. O’Malley. "Early-branching gut fungi possess a large, comprehensive array of biomass-degrading enzymes." March 11, 2016. Science Vol. 351, Issue 6278, pp. 1192-1195
- Charles H. Haitjema, Sean P. Gilmore, John K. Henske, Kevin V. Solomon, Randall de Groot, Alan Kuo, Stephen J. Mondo, Asaf A. Salamov, Kurt LaButti, Zhiying Zhao, Jennifer Chiniquy, Kerrie Barry, Heather M. Brewer, Samuel O. Purvine, Aaron T. Wright, Matthieu Hainaut, Brigitte Boxma, Theo van Alen, Johannes H. P. Hackstein, Bernard Henrissat, Scott E. Baker, Igor V. Grigoriev & Michelle A. O'Malley. "A parts list for fungal cellulosomes revealed by comparative genomics." 30 May 2017. Nature Microbiology volume 2, Article number: 17087
- O'Malley; Michelle, Solomon; Kevin, Haitjema; Charles. "Novel Proteins from Anaerobic Fungi and Uses Thereof." U.S. Patent No. US20180362597A1
