= Orlin D. Velev =

Bulgarian chemical engineer

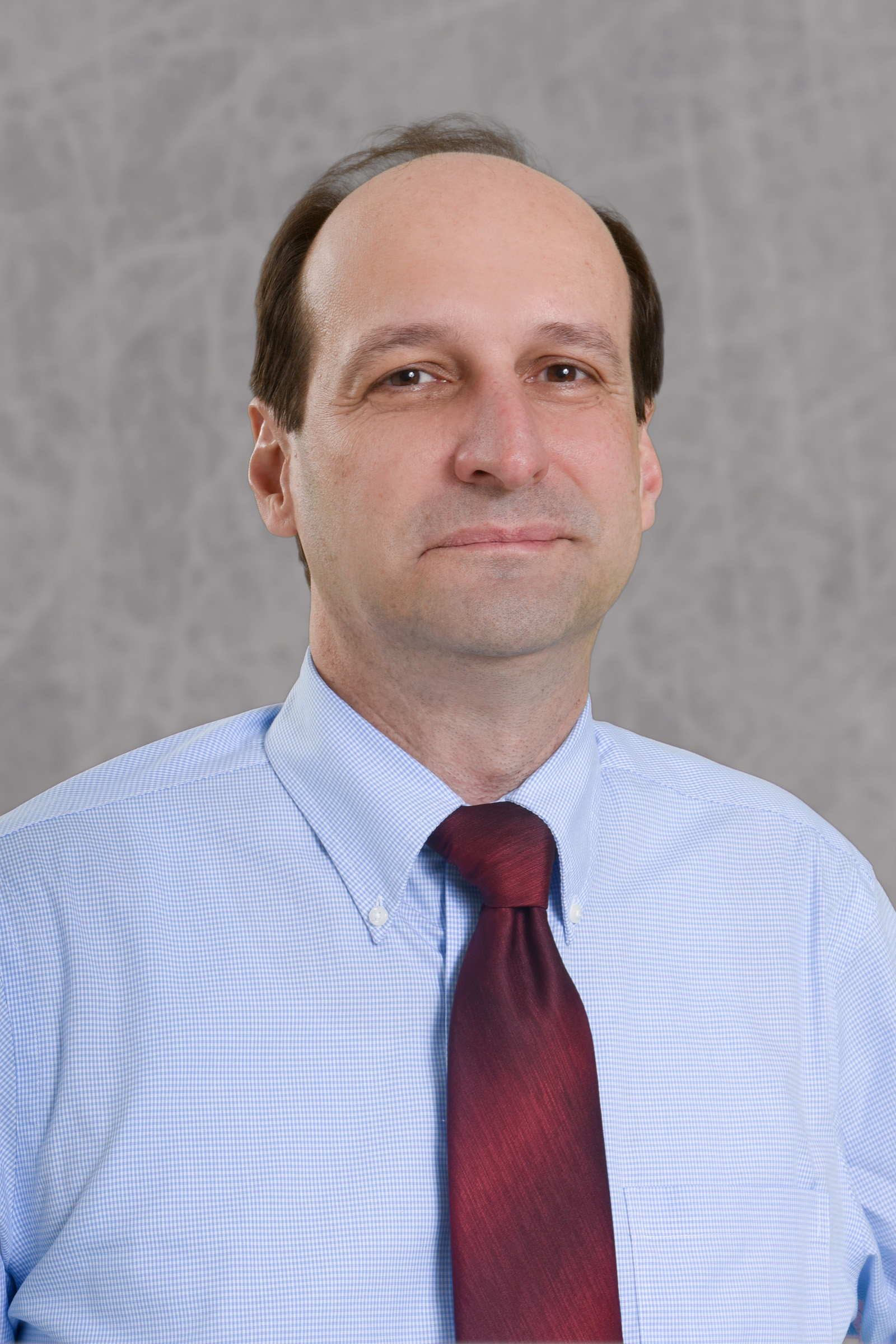
- Born: November 3, 1963 (age 63); Plovdiv, Bulgaria
- Education: Sofia University
- Scientific career
- Fields: Chemical engineering
- Workplaces: North Carolina State University

Orlin D. Velev (Bulgarian: Орлин Д. Велев) (born November 3, 1963, in Plovdiv, Bulgaria) is the S. Frank and Doris Culberson Distinguished Professor in the Department of Chemical and Biomolecular Engineering at North Carolina State University. He is best known for his work in soft matter, colloid science, and nanoscience.

== Biography ==
Orlin D. Velev was born in Plovdiv, Bulgaria. Velev received his B.S. and M.Sc. in Chemical Physics and Theoretical Chemistry in 1989 from Sofia University. He continued his doctoral studies at Sofia University to earn his Ph.D. in Physical Chemistry in 1996, while also spending one year as a researcher at the Nagayama Protein Array project in Japan. Following a postdoctoral position (1996-1998) and research assistant professorship (1998-2001) at the University of Delaware, Velev joined the faculty in the Department of Chemical and Biomolecular Engineering at North Carolina State University in 2001. He is married to Anka Veleva and they have one son, Orlin Velev Jr., who works in the aerospace industry.

== Professional contributions ==
=== Research interests ===
Velev's research covers a broad range of topics, but his key contributions are in the area of colloidal assembly. His research has advanced the field of directed and programmed colloidal assembly by using electric fields to make structures out of nanoparticles, microspheres, Janus and patchy particles. He has also discovered and developed new types of self-propelling microdevices, gel-based photovoltaic cells, soft robotic hydrogel actuators and microbot prototypes. His earlier research achievements include the first report of convective assembly of 2D colloidal crystals, the first templated fabrication of “colloidosome” and supraparticle clusters and the synthesis of "inverse opal” structures.

== Awards and honors ==
Velev has contributed more than 200 scientific articles and technologies based on his research have formed the basis of two companies, Xanofi and Benanova. Velev has served as member of the Editorial Advisory Boards of Langmuir, Chemistry of Materials, Biomicrofluidics, Particle, and Advances in Colloid and Interface Science, and is a fellow of the ACS and MRS.

- Braskem Award for Excellence in Materials Engineering and Science (AIChE, 2024)
- Langmuir Lecturer Award (ACS Division of Colloid and Surface Chemistry, 2018)
- R. J. Reynolds Tobacco Company Award (R.J. Reynolds)
- Andreas Acrivos Award (AIChE, 2017)
- Fellow of the Materials Research Society (MRS, 2017)
- Fellow of the American Chemical Society (ACS, 2011)
