= Songi Han =

American chemist and academic (born 1972)

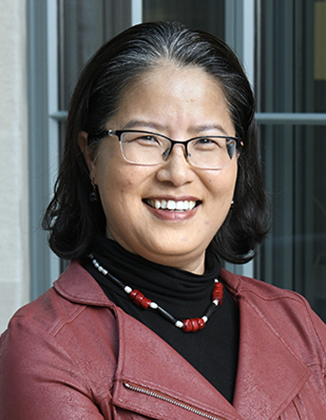
- Born: 1972 (age 53–54); Seoul, South Korea
- Education: RWTH Aachen University; University of Koln
- Scientific career
- Workplaces: Northwestern University; University of California, Santa Barbara
- Thesis: Correlation of Position and Motion by NMR: Pipe Flow, Falling Drop and Salt Water Ice. (2001)

Songi Han is an American chemist who is a professor in the department of chemistry and biochemistry at Northwestern University. Her research considers electron and nuclear spins as sensors and detectors. She was elected a Fellow of the International Society of Magnetic Resonance in 2019 and president of the International EPR Society in 2020.

== Early life and education ==
Han attended the University of Cologne as an undergraduate, where she majored in chemistry. She moved to the RWTH Aachen University, where she investigated magnetic resonance. She was awarded the Ampere Society Raymond Andrew Prize in 2002.

== Research and career ==
Han has pioneered the use of spin based approaches (including electron paramagnetic resonance, Nuclear magnetic resonance and relaxometry, to understand the structure-property relationships of biomolecules. Her work on dynamic nuclear polarization has enabled new probes for monitoring biological processes. This allows for the mapping of surface water differences around globular proteins.

== Awards and honors ==
- 2001 Ernst Award
- 2002 1st Raymond Andrew Prize
- 2004 The Camille and Henry Dreyfus Foundation Faculty Award
- 2008 Packard Fellowship
- 2011 National Institutes of Health Innovator Award
- 2015 Alexander von Humboldt Foundation Bessel Award
- 2018 Biophysical Society Innovation Award
- 2019 Named Fellow of the International Society of Magnetic Resonance
- 2020 Elected President of the International EPR Society
- 2021 Eastern Analytical Symposium Award for Outstanding Achievements in Magnetic Resonance
- 2021 Arnold and Mabel Beckman Foundation FIB-Milling Sample Preparation for Cellular CryoET
- 2023 Callaghan Lecturer Prize of the ISMAR
- 2024 Mark and Nancy Ratner Professor of Chemistry
- 2024 Bruker Prize Lecture of the Royal Society Chemistry EPR

== Selected publications ==
- Xuemei Zhang; Yanxian Lin; Neil A Eschmann; et al. (6 July 2017). "RNA stores tau reversibly in complex coacervates". PLOS Biology. 15 (7) e2002183. doi:10.1371/journal.pbio.2002183. ISSN 1544-9173. PMC 5500003. PMID 28683104. Wikidata Q33879490.
- Igor Koptyug; Kirill V. Kovtunov; Scott R Burt; Muhammad Sabieh Anwar; Christian Hilty; Song-I Han; Alexander Pines; Renad Z Sagdeev (5 April 2007). "para-Hydrogen-induced polarization in heterogeneous hydrogenation reactions". Journal of the American Chemical Society. 129 (17): 5580–5586. doi:10.1021/ja068653o. ISSN 0002-7863. PMID 17408268. Wikidata Q57819663.
- Douglas H Fabini; Ting Ann Siaw; Constantinos C. Stoumpos; et al. (2 November 2017). "Universal Dynamics of Molecular Reorientation in Hybrid Lead Iodide Perovskites". Journal of the American Chemical Society. 139 (46): 16875–16884. doi:10.1021/jacs.7b09536. ISSN 0002-7863. PMID 29094934. Wikidata Q46123078.
