= Devarajan Thirumalai =

Indian-American physicist

Devarajan (Dave) Thirumalai
- Born: India
- Education: MSc (1977); PhD Physical Chemistry (1982)
- Alma mater: Indian Institute of Technology, Kanpur, India; University of Minnesota
- Awards: Alfred P. Sloan Fellowship (1986–1988) Humboldt Research Award (2009); Fellow of the Royal Society of Chemistry (2009); Fellow of the Biophysical Society (2014); Fellow of the American Physical Society (2016); Oesper Award (2018); Irving Langmuir Prize (2019); Hans Neurath Award (2019) Founders Award (2025) Max Delbrück Prize (2025)
- Scientific career
- Fields: Biological Physics, Biophysics
- Workplaces: The University of Texas at Austin
- Thesis: Effective Potential Studies of Electron-Atom and Electron- Molecule Collisions (1982)
- Doctoral advisor: Donald G. Truhlar

Devarajan (Dave) Thirumalai, an Indian-born American physicist, is the Collie-Welch Reagents Professor in Chemistry at the University of Texas at Austin. His research spans equilibrium and non-equilibrium statistical mechanics, such as the transition from liquid to amorphous state, polymer-colloid interactions, and protein and RNA folding. He is known for his contributions to the theories of protein/RNA folding, protein aggregation, glasses (the Random First Order Transition – RFOT theory), and biological machines. He also does research in intrinsically disordered proteins (IDPs), organization and dynamics of chromosome, cell biophysics and developmental biology,,. Prior to moving to the University of Texas at Austin, he was a distinguished university professor in the University of Maryland from 2010 to 2015.

== Educational Background ==
Dave Thirumalai studied at the Indian Institute of Technology, Kanpur where he earned a MSc degree (1977). He earned his doctorate degree in 1982 from the University of Minnesota under Donald G. Truhlar.

== Academic career ==
After postdoctoral studies at the Columbia University in New York City, he joined University of Maryland as an assistant professor of physics in 1985. He is the founding director of the biophysics program in the University of Maryland. In 2016, he joined the University of Texas at Austin as the Collie-Welch Reagents Chair.

== Awards and honors ==
- 1986–1988 Alfred P. Sloan Fellowship.
- 1987–1992 Presidential Young Investigator Award.
- 2009 Humboldt Research Award for Senior U.S. Scientists.
- 2009 Fellow of the Royal Society of Chemistry.
- 2011 Honorary Senior Hans-Fisher Fellow.
- 2014 Fellow of the Biophysical Society.
- 2015 Fellow of the American Physical Society.
- 2016 Chemical Research Society of India (CRSI) Medal.
- 2016 ACS Theoretical Chemistry Award.
- 2018 Oesper Award, Chemistry, University of Cincinnati.
- 2019 APS Award, Irving Langmuir Prize.
- 2019 Hans Neurath Award, Protein Society.
- 2025 Founders Award, Biophysical Society.
- 2025 Max Delbrück Prize, American Physical Society.
