= Vincent Rotello =

American chemist

Vincent Rotello is an American materials scientist and engineer currently serving as Charles A. Goessmann Professor of Chemistry and University Distinguished Professor at the University of Massachusetts Amherst and the current editor-in-chief of American Chemical Society's Bioconjugate Chemistry. He joined the faculty at the University of Massachusetts in 1993, and has been the recipient of the NSF CAREER, Cottrell Scholar, Camille Dreyfus Teacher-Scholar, and Sloan Fellowship awards. More recently, he has received the American Chemical Society's Langmuir Lectureship (2010), and in 2016 he received the Transformational Research and Excellence in Education Award presented by Research Corporation, the Bioorganic Lectureship of the Royal Society of Chemistry, the Australian Nanotechnology Network Traveling Fellowship, and the Chinese Academy of Sciences, President's International Fellowship for Distinguished Researchers. He is a fellow of both the American Association for the Advancement of Science (AAAS) and of the Royal Society of Chemistry. He is also recognized in 2014, 2015 and 2018 by Thomson Reuters/Clarivate as Highly Cited Researcher. He is currently the Editor in Chief of Bioconjugate Chemistry, and is on the Editorial Board of 14 other journals. His research program focuses on using synthetic organic chemistry to engineer the interface between the synthetic and biological worlds, and spans the areas of devices, polymers, and nanotechnology/bionanotechnology, with over 550 peer-reviewed papers published to date. He is actively involved in the area of bionanotechnology, and his research includes programs in delivery, imaging, diagnostics and nanotoxicology.

With interests in bionanotechnology, polymers, organic chemistry and biology, he is cited as an expert in his field and maintaining a citation increase in the last 10 years.

== Education ==
He earned his B.S. from Illinois Institute of Technology from 1986 and his M.Phil. in 1987 followed by his Ph.D. from Yale University in 1990. He was an NSF postdoctoral fellow at M.I.T from 1990 to 1993.

== Selected publications ==
- Gold nanoparticles in chemical and biological sensing, Krishnendu Saha, Sarit S Agasti, Chaekyu Kim, Xiaoning Li, Vincent M Rotello, American Chemical Society, 2012.
- Gold nanoparticles in delivery applications, Partha Ghosh, Gang Han, Mrinmoy De, Chae Kyu Kim, Vincent M Rotello, Advanced Drug Delivery Reviews, 2008.
- Applications of nanoparticles in biology, Mrinmoy De, Partha S Ghosh, Vincent M Rotello, Advanced Materials, 2008.
- Toxicity of gold nanoparticles functionalized with cationic and anionic side chains, Catherine M Goodman, Catherine D McCusker, Tuna Yilmaz, Vincent M Rotello, Bioconjugate chemistry, 2004.
- Self-assembly of nanoparticles into structured spherical and network aggregates, Andrew K Boal, Faysal Ilhan, Jason E DeRouchey, Thomas Thurn-Albrecht, Thomas P Russell, Vincent M Rotello, Nature, 2000.
