= Eric Meggers =

German chemist

Eric Meggers (born 10 May 1968 in Bonn, Germany) is a German chemist and professor of organic chemistry and chemical biology at the University of Marburg, Germany. His research currently focuses on the design of chiral catalysts for stereoselective synthesis.

== Biography ==
Born in Bonn, Germany, Meggers studied chemistry at the University of Bonn and subsequently received his Ph.D. in 1999 under Bernd Giese at the University of Basel, Switzerland. After postdoctoral research at the Scripps Research Institute in La Jolla, USA, Meggers started his independent career in 2002 as assistant professor at the University of Pennsylvania, USA. Since 2007, Meggers is full professor of organic chemistry and chemical biology at the University of Marburg, Germany.

== Research ==
Meggers specializes on exploiting metal-centered stereochemistry for applications in medicine, chemical biology, and asymmetric catalysis. The research program started with the design of metal-based protein kinase inhibitors, the subsequent design of chiral organocatalysts based on inert metal complexes (metal-templated organocatalysis), and finally arrived at the current focal point of developing chiral transition metal catalysts featuring exclusively metal-centered chirality (chiral-at-metal catalysts).

Other unrelated previous research:

- Glycol nucleic acid (GNA): Establishing the Watson-Crick base pairing ability of the minimal nucleic acid GNA containing an acyclic three-carbon propylene glycol phosphodiester backbone.
- Bioorthogonal catalysis: Development of organometallic complexes for catalysis in living biological systems.
