= Olafs Daugulis =

American chemist

Olafs Daugulis is an American chemist, currently the Robert A. Welch Chair of Chemistry at the University of Houston.
