= Nils G. Walter =

American chemist

Nils Walter
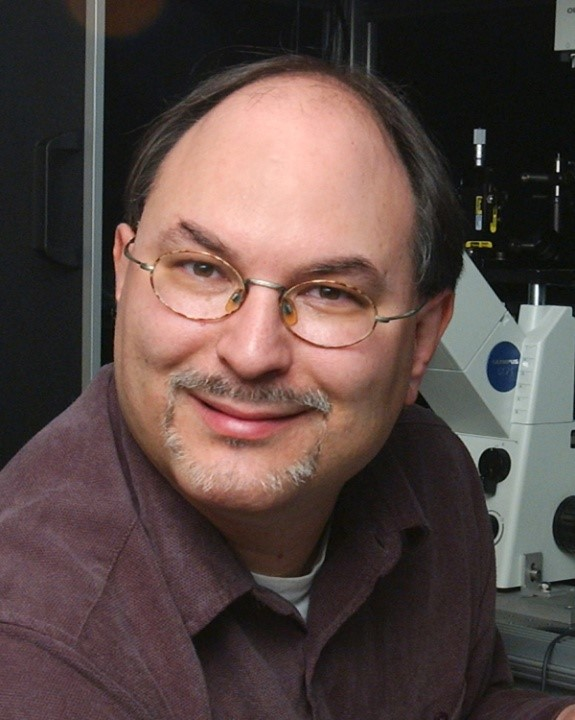
- Born: August 4, 1966 (age 60); Frankfurt am Main, Germany
- Education: Technical University of Darmstadt
- Known for: Single-molecule RNA analysis
- Scientific career
- Fields: Biophysical chemistry
- Workplaces: University of Michigan
- Website: Walter Lab

Nils G. Walter is an American chemist who is the Francis S. Collins Collegiate Professor of Chemistry, Biophysics, and Biological Chemistry at the University of Michigan, Ann Arbor. Research in the Nils Walter Lab focuses on non-coding RNA through the lens of single molecule techniques. He is the Founding Director of the Single Molecule Analysis in real-Time (SMART) Center at Michigan. In addition, Walter is the Founding Co-director for the University of Michigan Center for RNA Biomedicine whose mission is to enrich the university's intellectual and training environment around RNA Biomedicine. He served as associate director for the Michigan Post-baccalaureate Research Education Program (PREP) from 2015 to 2025.

== Education and early life ==
Nils G. Walter was born in 1966 in Frankfurt am Main, Germany. He received his “Vordiplom” (B.S.) and “Diploma” (Masters) from the Technical University of Darmstadt after performing research with Hans-Günther Gassen on the physicochemical characterization of a protein dehydrogenase enzyme. He is a Dr. Ing. (PhD) graduate from the Technical University of Darmstadt and the Max-Planck-Institute for Biophysical Chemistry where he studied molecular in vitro evolution of DNA and RNA using fluorescence techniques with Nobel laureate Manfred Eigen. For his postdoctoral studies, he turned to RNA enzymes under the guidance of John M. Burke at the University of Vermont.

== Career ==
The Nils Walter Lab studies both non-coding RNA and protein-coding RNAs, and how the former control the gene expression of the latter, using tools from biophysics, biochemistry, cell biology, molecular biology and chemical biology. Most prominently, the lab uses leading-edge single molecule and super-resolution microscopy and single-molecule FRET approaches to probe the diverse functional mechanisms of transcriptional and translational riboswitches, the spliceosome, the RNA silencing and RNA interference machinery, ribozymes, as well as devices from DNA nanotechnology, in vitro and in live cells.

Walter is the author of more than 240 articles (h-index >70) and numerous patents and disclosures of invention, including one on a new diagnostic single molecule counting approach termed SiMREPS that startup company aLight Sciences Inc. was founded to commercialize. He has been invited to speak at over 280 speaking engagements and is the Principal Investigator of two dozen current and past National Institutes of Health research grants and three dozen private foundation grants (see Nils Walter Lab).

He currently serves or has served on several editorial boards including Methods, Wiley Interdisciplinary Reviews (WIRES), Biopolymers and the Journal of Biological Chemistry, as well as being a guest editor for Chemical Reviews, Encyclopedia of Biophysics, and Methods in Enzymology. Walter has received numerous honors including the Jean Dreyfus Boissevain Lectureship of Trinity University, the Harold R. Johnson Diversity Service Award, the Imes and Moore Faculty Award, the Faculty Recognition Award of the University of Michigan, the RNA Society Mid-Career Award, and the Biophysical Society Kazuhiko Kinosita Award in Single-Molecule Biophysics. He has been elected an AAAS Fellow. Walter is a member of several professional organizations including the Society of German Chemists (GDCh), German Society for Biochemistry and Molecular Biology (GBM), the RNA Society, the American Chemical Society, the American Association for the Advancement of Science, and the Biophysical Society.
