= Kenneth D. Jordan =

American chemist

Kenneth D. Jordan is an American chemist. He is currently the Richard King Mellon Professor and Distinguished Professor of Computational Chemistry at University of Pittsburgh and an Elected Fellow of the American Association for the Advancement of Science, American Chemical Society, Royal Society of Chemistry and American Physical Society.
