= Munira Khalil =

American chemist and academic

- Education: Massachusetts Institute of Technology; Colgate University
- Scientific career
- Workplaces: University of Washington
- Thesis: A tale of coupled vibrations in solution told by coherent two-dimensional infrared spectroscopy (2004)

Munira Khalil is an American chemist who is the Leon C. Johnson Professor of Chemistry and former department chair at the University of Washington.

== Early life and education ==
Khalil attended Colgate University, where she majored in chemistry and English and was a member of Phi Beta Kappa. She earned her PhD at the Massachusetts Institute of Technology, where she developed coherent two-dimensional infrared spectroscopy to investigate the molecular structure of coupled vibrations on a picosecond timescale. Khalil then moved to the University of California, Berkeley and Lawrence Berkeley National Laboratory as a postdoctoral researcher, where she was a Miller Research Fellow.

== Research and career ==
In 2007, Khalili joined the University of Washington. In her research, she uses ultrafast spectroscopies to understand the structural dynamics of molecules. Photoinduced charge transfer depends on an interplay between atomic and electronic processes on multi-dimensional energy surfaces. She develops 3D electronic-vibrational femtosecond spectroscopies to understand vibrational and electronics motions on femtosecond timescales. In particular, she is interested in how solvents (e.g., water in photosynthesis) impact the electron transfer processes.

Khalil was appointed chair of the department of chemistry in 2020. In her 5-year term, she led the department through the COVID-19 pandemic, broadened shared governance, and spearheaded efforts for a new chemistry building.

== Awards and honors ==
- 2003-2006 Fellow of the Miller Institute
- 2007 Dreyfus New Faculty Award
- 2008 David and Lucile Packard Foundation Fellowship in Science and Engineering
- 2009 National Science Foundation CAREER Award
- 2011 Chinese-American Kavli Frontiers of Science symposium
- 2012 Sloan Research Fellowship
- 2013 Camille-Dreyfus Teacher-Scholar Award
- 2014 Journal of Physical Chemistry Lectureship
- 2011 Kavli Frontiers of Science Fellow
- 2017 American Physical Society Fellow
- 2021 Elected to the Washington State Academy of Sciences
- 2022 Joe W. and Dorothy Dorsett Brown Foundation Brown Investigator Awards
- 2025 David Thorud Leadership Award

== Selected publications ==
- Khalil M; Demirdöven N; Tokmakoff A (30 January 2003). "Obtaining absorptive line shapes in two-dimensional infrared vibrational correlation spectra". Physical Review Letters. 90 (4) 047401. doi:10.1103/PHYSREVLETT.90.047401. ISSN 0031-9007. PMID 12570457.
- Golonzka O; Khalil M; Demirdöven N; Tokmakoff A (1 March 2001). "Vibrational anharmonicities revealed by coherent two-dimensional infrared spectroscopy". Physical Review Letters. 86 (10): 2154–2157. doi:10.1103/PHYSREVLETT.86.2154. ISSN 0031-9007. PMID 11289878.
- Nurettin Demirdöven; Christopher M Cheatum; Hoi Sung Chung; Munira Khalil; Jasper Knoester; Andrei Tokmakoff (1 June 2004). "Two-dimensional infrared spectroscopy of antiparallel beta-sheet secondary structure". Journal of the American Chemical Society. 126 (25): 7981–7990. doi:10.1021/JA049811J. hdl:11370/822a6b4b-8dc3-41e3-8078-1ece04f896f2. ISSN 0002-7863. PMID 15212548.
