= Jeffrey Zink =

American molecular biologist and chemist

- Education: University of Wisconsin–Madison; University of Illinois at Urbana–Champaign
- Scientific career
- Fields: Molecular biology
- Workplaces: University of California, Los Angeles

Jeffrey I. Zink is an American molecular biologist and chemist currently a distinguished professor at University of California, Los Angeles whose interests are in materials, nanoscience, physical and inorganic chemistry. His current research is examining molecules containing metal and nanomaterials. He worked with Fraser Stoddart to help develop machines that could be applied to deliver drugs.

== Education ==
He graduated from University of Wisconsin with his B.S. before then earning his Ph.D. from University of Illinois in 1970.

== Selected publications ==
- Thomas, Courtney R.; Ferris, Daniel P.; Lee, Jae-Hyun; Choi, Eunjoo; Cho, Mi Hyeon; Kim, Eun Sook; Stoddart, J. Fraser; Shin, Jeon-Soo; Cheon, Jinwoo; Zink, Jeffrey I. (16 July 2010). "Noninvasive Remote-Controlled Release of Drug Molecules in Vitro Using Magnetic Actuation of Mechanized Nanoparticles". Journal of the American Chemical Society. 132 (31). American Chemical Society (ACS): 10623–10625. doi:10.1021/ja1022267. ISSN 0002-7863. PMID 20681678.
- Meng, Huan; Liong, Monty; Xia, Tian; Li, Zongxi; Ji, Zhaoxia; Zink, Jeffrey I.; Nel, Andre E. (14 July 2010). "Engineered Design of Mesoporous Silica Nanoparticles to Deliver Doxorubicin and P-Glycoprotein siRNA to Overcome Drug Resistance in a Cancer Cell Line". ACS Nano. 4 (8). American Chemical Society (ACS): 4539–4550. doi:10.1021/nn100690m. ISSN 1936-0851. PMC 3899722. PMID 20731437.
- Ambrogio, Michael W.; Pecorelli, Travis A.; Patel, Kaushik; Khashab, Niveen M.; Trabolsi, Ali; Khatib, Hussam A.; Botros, Youssry Y.; Zink, Jeffrey I.; Stoddart, J. Fraser (7 July 2010). "Snap-Top Nanocarriers". Organic Letters. 12 (15). American Chemical Society (ACS): 3304–3307. doi:10.1021/ol101286a. ISSN 1523-7060. PMID 20608669.
- Ji, Zhaoxia; Jin, Xue; George, Saji; Xia, Tian; Meng, Huan; Wang, Xiang; Suarez, Elizabeth; Zhang, Haiyuan; Hoek, Eric M.V.; Godwin, Hilary; Nel, André E.; Zink, Jeffrey I. (10 June 2010). "Dispersion and Stability Optimization of TiO2 Nanoparticles in Cell Culture Media". Environmental Science & Technology. 44 (19). American Chemical Society (ACS): 7309–7314. Bibcode:2010EnST...44.7309J. doi:10.1021/es100417s. ISSN 0013-936X. PMC 3971839. PMID 20536146.
- Hom, Christopher; Lu, Jie; Liong, Monty; Luo, Hanzhi; Li, Zongxi; Zink, Jeffrey I.; Tamanoi, Fuyuhiko (11 May 2010). "Mesoporous Silica Nanoparticles Facilitate Delivery of siRNA to Shutdown Signaling Pathways in Mammalian Cells". Small. 6 (11). Wiley: 1185–1190. doi:10.1002/smll.200901966. ISSN 1613-6810. PMC 2953950. PMID 20461725.
