= Janis Louie =

American chemist

- Born: November 3, 1971; San Francisco
- Education: University of California, Los Angeles (B.S.), Yale University (Ph.D 1998)
- Scientific career
- Doctoral advisor: John Hartwig

Janis Louie (born November 3, 1971, in San Francisco, California, U.S.) is a Chemistry professor and Henry Eyring Fellow at The University of Utah. Louie contributes to the chemistry world with her research in inorganic, organic, and polymer chemistry.

== Education ==
Louie received her B.S. from University of California, Los Angeles in 1993, where she was a cheerleader. She then moved on to get her Ph.D. from Yale University for work under Professor John Hartwig in 1998. In the years of 1998-2001 Louie was an NIH Postdoctoral Fellow at the California Institute of Technology.

== Research ==
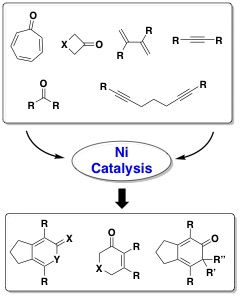
Figure 1: Nickel catalysis

Accessibility to structurally diverse organic compounds such as carbocycles and heterocycles are of great importance to the pharmaceutical and agrochemical industries. However, the synthesis of these types of compounds requires harsh conditions such as high temperatures and pressures. Dr. Louie's research aims to mediate these transitions via metal catalyzed reactions, mainly involving nickel catalysis. Dr. Louie and her team focus on nickel-based systems not only because it is much less expensive than the more widely used palladium and platinum, but also because it offers a wider range of chemical activity, such as nickel, being a more electropositive transition metal which allows it to undergo oxidative addition readily; oxidize Nickel and lessens the electron density around the atom itself.^{6} This allows for the cross-coupling of electrophiles to occur which is pivotal in the formation of carbocycles and heterocycles. Dr. Louie and her colleagues further enhance the catalytic ability by combining nickel with N-heterocyclic carbene (NHC) ligands. The NHC ligands are largely sterically hindered and electron donating, which allows for improved and less harsh reactions conditions by expanding the chemical scope of the substrate. (Taking all these chemical factors into account, the Ni/NHC catalyst can effectively couple diynes and nitriles to create pyridines using a hetero-oxidative coupling mechanism. Also, this nickel catalysis method (Figure 1) offers a wider range of substrates for which nickel can perform cyclo-additions on, substrates such as; vinylcyclopropanes, aldehydes, ketones, tropones, 3-azetidinones, and 3-oxetanones).

Louie is also involved in the study and research of diversifying organometallic catalysts. Usually, an organometallic catalyst is only used for one specific type of reaction, but Louie has been working on the development of these organometallic catalysts as to make them able to catalyze more than one specific type of reaction. This may be done by using the same catalyst, or by using one catalyst that can be slightly altered into making a catalyst that is useful for another type of reaction.

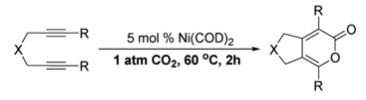
Figure 2: Formation of 2-pyrones

Louie also experimented with the production of 2-pyrones. She would use carbon dioxide mixed with different diynes to prepare different 2-pyrones. The simple reaction for the formation of 2-pyrones is shown in Figure 2 [null 2].

Louie's nickel imidazolyidene complexes help progress the cyclization of terminal and internal functional group like aryl and alkyl isocyanates in a rather mild manner as opposed to synthetic synthesis.

== Selected works ==
=== Major publications ===
- N.D. Staudaher, J. Lovelace, M. P. Johnson, J. Louie "Preparation of Aryl Alkyl Ketenes" Org. Synth. 2016.
- Thakur, A.; Evangelista, J.; Louie, J. (2015). "An in situ Ni-Catalyzed Approach to Substituted Piperidones". J. Org. Chem. 80: 9951–9958.
- Thakur, A.; Louie, J. (2015). "Advances in Nickel-Catalyzed Cycloaddition Reactions To Construct Carbocycles and Heterocycles". Acc. Chem. Res. 48: 2534–2365.; Invited Contribution to a Special Issue (Earth Abundant Metals in Homogeneous Catalysis).
- Zhong, Y.; Spahn, N. A.; Stolley, R. M.; Nguyen, M. H.; Louie, J. (2015). "3,5-Disubstituted-2-Aminopyridines via Ni-catalyzed Cycloaddition of Terminal Alkynes and Cyanamides". Synlett. 26: 307–312.; Invited Contribution to a Special Issue (Cluster Report on Catalysis with Sustainable Metals).
- Kumar, P.; Thakur, A.; Hong, X.; Houk, K. N.; Louie, J. (2014). "[Ni(NHC)]-catalyzed Cycloaddition of Diynes and Tropone: Apparent Enone Cycloaddition Involving an 8p Insertion". J. Am. Chem. Soc. 136: 17844–17851.
- Staudaher, N. D.; Stolley, R. M.; Louie, J. (2014). "Synthesis, Mechanism of Formation, and Catalytic Activity of Xantphos Nickel p-Complexes" "Title". Chem. Commun. 50: 15577–15580.
- Thakur, A; Facer, ME; Louie, J (2013). "Nickel-catalyzed cycloaddition of 1,3-dienes with 3-azetidinones and 3-oxetanones". Angew Chem Int Ed Engl. 52: 12161–5. doi:10.1002/anie.201306869. PMC 4113093. PMID 24573793..
- Stolley, RM; Duong, HA; Louie, J (2013). "Mechanistic Evaluation of the Ni(IPr)_{2}-Catalyzed Cycloaddition of Alkynes and Nitriles to Afford Pyridines: Evidence for the Formation of a Key η^{1}-Ni(IPr)_{2}(RCN) Intermediate". Organometallics. 32: 4952–4960. doi:10.1021/om400666k. PMC 4159214. PMID 25214702..
- Lane, TK; Nguyen, MH; D'Souza, BR; Spahn, NA; Louie, J (2013). "The iron-catalyzed construction of 2-aminopyrimidines from alkynenitriles and cyanamides". Chem Commun. 49: 7735–7. doi:10.1039/c3cc44422h. PMC 4144345. PMID 23877441..
- Stolley, R. M.; Duong, H. A.; Thomas, D. R.; Louie, J. (2012). "The Discovery of [Ni(IPr)RCN]_{2} Species and their Role as Cycloaddition Catalyts for the Formation of Pyridines". J. Am. Chem. Soc. 134: 15154–15162. doi:10.1021/ja3075924. PMC 3480329. PMID 22917161.
- Lane, TK; D'Souza, BR; Louie, J (2012). "Iron-catalyzed formation of 2-aminopyridines from diynes and cyanamides". J Org Chem. 77: 7555–63. doi:10.1021/jo3012418. PMC 3480319. PMID 22845666..
- Kumar, P.; Zhang, K.; Louie, J. (2012). "An Expeditious Route to Eight-Membered Heterocycles by Nickel-Catalyzed Cycloaddition: Low-Temperature C_{sp2}-C_{sp3} Bond Cleavage". Angew. Chem. Int. Ed. 51: 8602–8606. doi:10.1002/anie.201203521. PMC 3557805. PMID 22806996.
- Kumar, P.; Louie, J. (2012). "A Single Step Approach to Highly Substituted Piperidines Via Ni-Catalyzed β-Carbon Elimination". Org. Lett. 14: 2026–2029.; Synfacts Highlight 2012, 8(7), 0715;
- Kumar, P; Louie, J (2012). "A single step approach to piperidines via Ni-catalyzed β-carbon elimination". Org Lett. 14: 2026–9. doi:10.1021/ol300534j. PMC 4138124. PMID 22468962..
- Stolley, RM; Guo, W; Louie, J (2012). "Palladium-catalyzed arylation of cyanamides". Org Lett. 14: 322–5. doi:10.1021/ol203069p. PMC 4113087. PMID 22142553..
- Tekavec, TN; Louie, J (2008). "Nickel-catalyzed cycloadditions of unsaturated hydrocarbons, aldehydes, and ketones". J Org Chem. 73: 2641–8. doi:10.1021/jo702508w. PMC 4144363. PMID 18318544..

== Awards and honours ==
- Henry Erying Assistant Professorship 2004
- NSF Faculty Early CAREER Development Award, 2004-2009
- ACS/Dreyfus PROGRESS "Rising Stars" Lectureship, 2005-2006
- Camille and Henry Dreyfus Teacher-Scholar Award, 2005-2010
- Alfred P. Sloan Award 2006
- CS Arthur C. Cope Scholar Award 2007
- Fellow of the American Association for the Advancement of Science, 2012
- Kavli Foundation Fellow, 2012
- Sigma Chi Beta Epsilon Chapter Teacher Appreciation Award, 2015
