= Lauren Zarzar =

American materials scientist

Lauren Dell Zarzar is an American materials scientist whose research investigates smart materials, especially in the form of emulsions, colloids, and hydrogels, the use of lasers for patterning both hard and soft materials, and structural coloration. She is a professor of chemistry, materials science and engineering at the Pennsylvania State University.

== Education and career ==
Zarzar received a double bachelor's degree from the University of Pennsylvania in 2008: a B.A. in chemistry and a B.S. in economics. She went on to graduate study in chemistry at Harvard University, where she completed her Ph.D. in 2013. Her dissertation, Dynamic Hybrid Materials: Hydrogel Actuators and Catalytic Microsystems, was supervised by Joanna Aizenberg.

After postdoctoral research at the Massachusetts Institute of Technology with Timothy Swager from 2013 to 2016, she joined Penn State as an assistant professor of chemistry and of materials science and engineering in 2016. In 2019 she shifted to full time in the Department of Chemistry, retaining a courtesy appointment in the Department of Materials Science and Engineering. She was promoted to associate professor in 2022 and full professor in 2024.

She is also the founder of a spinoff company, Chromatir Technologies LLC, focused on using structural coloration for optical security.

== Recognition ==
Zarzar was a recipient of the 2021 Marion Milligan Mason Award for Women in the Chemical Sciences of the American Association for the Advancement of Science. She was a 2025 recipient of the Presidential Early Career Award for Scientists and Engineers.

She was a 2022 recipient of the Camille Dreyfus Teacher-Scholar Awards. Penn State gave Zarzar their 2025 Faculty Scholar Medal.

== Personal life ==
Zarzar's grandparents, Robert and Adla Zarzar, were respectively a surgeon from Bethlehem and a Christian Palestinian born in Brazil; they moved from Lima, Peru to Lima, Ohio in the 1950s.
