= Gaetano T. Montelione =

American Biophysical Chemist

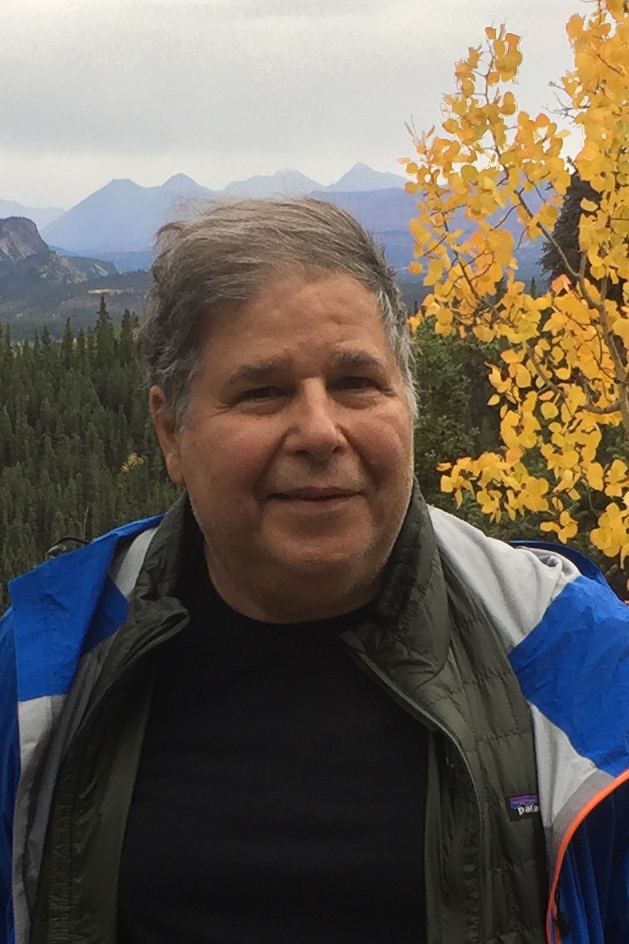
- Born: Bronx, New York
- Education: B.S.in Biochemistry (Cornell University); M.A., Ph.D. in Physical Chemistry (Cornell University)
- Scientific career
- Fields: Molecular Biophysics, Structural Biology

Gaetano T. Montelione is an American biophysical chemist, Professor of Chemistry and Chemical Biology, and Constellation Endowed Chair in Structural Bioinformatics at Rensselaer Polytechnic Institute in Troy, NY.

His research program includes work on Nuclear Magnetic Resonance (NMR) pulse sequence development, software for automated analysis of protein NMR data, and applications of structural bioinformatics in biomedical research.

== Background and education ==
Gaetano Montelione was born in the Bronx, NY. He graduated from Half Hollow Hills High School in Dix Hills, NY. He received a B.S. with Highest Honors in Biochemistry from Cornell University in Ithaca, NY, and completed a Ph.D. in Physical Chemistry at Cornell University under the joint mentorship of Harold A. Scheraga (Cornell) and Kurt Wüthrich (ETH - Zürich).

Montelione carried out post-doctoral research in protein NMR pulse sequence development in the laboratory of Gerhard Wagner in the Biophysics Research Division at the University of Michigan, Ann Arbor.

He subsequently joined the faculty of the Department of Molecular Biology and Biochemistry at Rutgers University (New Brunswick, NJ), and the Rutgers Center for Advanced Biotechnology and Medicine (Piscataway, NJ), directed by Aaron Shatkin. He was promoted to the rank of Distinguished Professor and appointed as the inaugural holder of the endowed Jerome and Lorraine Aresty Chair in Cancer Research. Montelione continues his research as a Professor and Constellation Endowed Chair in the Department of Chemistry and Chemical Biology at Rensselaer Polytechnic University and as Distinguished Professor Emeritus at Rutgers University.

== Career ==
From 2000 to 2016, Montelione was Director of the National Institutes of Health (NIH) Northeast Structural Genomics Consortium (NESG), funded through the NIH Protein Structure Initiative. The NESG program developed new technology for protein sample production, NMR, X-ray crystallography, and structural bioinformatics. More than 1,200 protein three-dimensional structures were determined by the NESG team, led by Montelione, using crystallography and NMR. Most of these were the first structures determined from large protein families, providing the basis for creating three-dimensional models of hundreds of thousands of protein structures by homology modeling and machine learning.

With G. Wagner (Michigan), Montelione carried out pioneering work on NMR pulse sequence development, including the design and implementation of the first triple-resonance protein NMR experiments for determining polypeptide resonance assignments, as well as the ZZ-exchange and J1-resolved E_COSY experiments. At Rutgers, he followed up this work by development of the HCCNH-TOCSY, HCCcoNH-TOCSY, and related triple-resonance NMR experiments used for determining resonance assignments and 3D structures of proteins.

Montelione has made key contributions in computational NMR methods development, including the development of software for automated analysis of protein resonance assignments, automated analysis of 3D structures, and for protein NMR model quality assessment. Work with Prof. R. Krug on structure-function relationships of the influenza A non-structural protein 1 (NS1) and SARS corona virus proteases have provided the basis for creation of attenuated virus vaccines and leads for antiviral drug development.

Currently, as an advisor to the world-wide Protein Data Bank, and co-chair of the international wwPDB Task Force on NMR Structure Validation, Montelione leads efforts to standardize methods for protein NMR model validation. He is also a member of the Prediction Assessment Committee of the Critical Assessment of Protein Structure Prediction (CASP).

Montelione was co-scientific founder of Structure Function Genomics, Inc., Geneformatics, Inc., and Nexomics Biosciences, Inc.

== Honors and awards ==
- Damon Runyon Cancer Research Fellowship Award
- Searle Scholar Award
- Johnson & Johnson Research Discovery Award
- American Cyanamid Award in Physical and Analytical Chemistry
- National Science Foundation Young Investigator Award
- Procter & Gamble Young Investigator Award
- Camille and Henry Dreyfus Teacher-Scholar Award
- Rutgers University Board of Trustees Award for Scholarly Excellence
- Biophysical Society Michael and Kate Bárány Award for Young Investigators
- Elected Fellow of the American Association for the Advancement of Science (AAAS) 2007
- Inaugural Jerome and Lorraine Aresty Endowed Chair, Rutgers University
- Constellation Endowed Chair in Structural Bioinformatics, Rensselaer Polytechnic Institute.
