= Thomas F. George =

American academic administrator

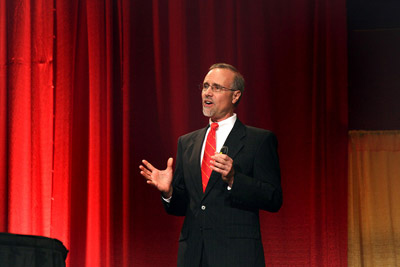
Dr. Thomas F. George

Thomas F. George is chancellor and professor of chemistry and physics at the University of Missouri-St. Louis. Born in Philadelphia, Pennsylvania, George earned a bachelor of arts degree with a double major in chemistry and mathematics from Gettysburg College in Pennsylvania, then a master of science and a doctor of philosophy degree in theoretical chemistry from Yale University. He was chancellor of the University of Wisconsin–Stevens Point, before taking the St. Louis job in 2003, and has announced his intention to retire from the University of Missouri-St. Louis in September, 2019. He is married to Barbara Harbach, chair of the University of Missouri-St. Louis’s Department of Music, director of the university's School of Fine and Performing Arts, and Curators’ Distinguished Professor of Music.
