= Athanassios Z. Panagiotopoulos =

American physical chemist

Athanassios Z. Panagiotopoulos is currently the Susan Dod Brown Professor of Chemical and Biological Engineering in the Department of Chemical and Biological Engineering of Princeton University.

== Education and academic career ==
Prof. Panagiotopoulos received his undergraduate degree from the National Technical University of Athens in 1982 and a PhD from Massachusetts Institute of Technology in 1986, both in Chemical Engineering. He was a postdoctoral fellow in physical chemistry at the University of Oxford (1986–87) and a faculty member at Cornell University (1987–97) and the Institute for Physical Science and Technology of the University of Maryland (1997-2000).

=== Research ===
Research in the Panagiotopoulos group focuses on development and application of theoretical and computer simulation techniques for the study of properties of fluids and materials. Emphasis is on molecular-based models that explicitly represent the main interactions in a system. These models can be used to predict the behavior of materials at conditions inaccessible to experiment and to gain a fundamental understanding of the microscopic basis for observed macroscopic properties, utilizing large-scale numerical computations. The group emphasizes development of novel simulation algorithms for free energies and phase transitions. An example of such a methodology is Gibbs ensemble Monte Carlo, which provides a direct way to obtain coexistence properties of fluids from a single simulation.

=== Publications and books ===
Prof. Panagiotopoulos is the author of more than 250 technical papers and of the undergraduate textbook Essential Thermodynamics: An undergraduate textbook for chemical engineers (2011).

== Awards and achievements ==
He has received numerous awards and honors, including the AIChE Colburn Award, and the Prausnitz Award in applied chemical thermodynamics. He was elected to the U.S. National Academy of Engineering in 2004, as a Fellow to both the American Academy of Arts and Sciences and the American Association for the Advancement of Science in 2012, and as a Fellow of the American Institute of Chemical Engineers (AIChE) in 2014.
