= Robert E. Cohen =

American chemical engineer (1947–2026)

Robert E. Cohen (January 21, 1947 – July 9, 2026) was an American chemical engineer and academic, who was a professor at the Massachusetts Institute of Technology known for his work in polymers.

In 2010, Cohen was elected a member of the National Academy of Engineering. He was also a fellow of the American Institute of Chemical Engineers, the American Physical Society, and the Materials Research Society.

== Early life and education ==
Cohen was raised in Oil City, Pennsylvania, and earned his master's and doctorate from the California Institute of Technology. He next pursued a postdoctoral fellowship at Oxford University.

== Career ==
Cohen joined the MIT faculty in 1973, where he became known for his leadership of the polymer engineering program; he founded MIT's Program in Polymers and Soft Matter in 1986 and the DuPont/MIT Alliance in 2000. At MIT, he rose to a named chair professorship, retiring emeritus as the Raymond A. (1921) and Helen E. St. Laurent Professor of Chemical Engineering.

In 2010, Cohen was elected a member of the National Academy of Engineering for research on polymer morphology and surfaces, commercial products and processes, successful entrepreneurship, and novel educational programs. He was also a fellow of the American Institute of Chemical Engineers, the American Physical Society, and the Materials Research Society.

== Death ==
Cohen died from complications of Parkinson's disease on July 9, 2026, at the age of 79.
