= Chase Beisel =

German biologist

- Education: California Institute of Technology (PhD 2009)
- Known for: RNA engineering
- Awards: RNA Society Mid-Career Award, European Union ERC Proof of Concept Grant, Pettenkofer Prize
- Scientific career
- Fields: synthetic RNA biology
- Institutions: National Institutes of Health, North Carolina State University, Julius-Maximilians-Universität Würzburg (JMU)

Chase Beisel is a professor of synthetic RNA biology. at Julius-Maximilians-Universität Würzburg (JMU) (Bavaria, Germany) and a Department Head at the Helmholtz Institute for RNA-based Infection Research (HIRI), a site of the Braunschweig Helmholtz Centre for Infection Research (HZI) in cooperation with the JMU.

== Work ==
Chase Beisel has been researching RNA engineering since receiving his PhD in chemical engineering from the California Institute of Technology (Pasadena, US) in 2009. After two years at the National Institutes of Health (Bethesda, Maryland, USA) he joined the Department of Chemical and Biomolecular Engineering at North Carolina State University (Raleigh, North Carolina, USA) as an Assistant Professorin 2011. Here, he worked on RNA-guided immune systems, so-called CRISPR-Cas systems, and was promoted to Associate professor with tenure in 2017.

In 2018, Chase Beisel was appointed as a W2-Professor at the Medical Faculty of Julius-Maximilians-Universität Würzburg and as a Group Leader at the Helmholtz Institute for RNA-based Infection Research (HIRI). He became a head of department at HIRI and a full professor (W3) at JMU in 2021.

== Characterization of the Cas12a2 nuclease ==
Beisel's research in the field of CRISPR biology and technologies aims to understand the functional diversity of CRISPR-Cas immune systems and to use these findings to develop new and improved technologies for analyzing, diagnosing, and treating infectious diseases. In 2023, his work led to the first characterization of the Cas12a2 nuclease, which represents a completely new type of gene scissors.

== Research on bacterial immune systems and infections ==
The discovery of CRISPR-Cas systems in microbes has led to the development of new tools for genome editing, which provide new means to diagnose, treat, and prevent diseases. CRISPR-Cas refers to the natural immune defense of bacteria: a sophisticated strategy of nature used by bacteria to defend themselves against viral attacks. Chase Beisel is researching how these bacterial immune systems work and how they can be translated into technologies. Together with his research group, he interrogates the properties of the immune systems using cell-free transcription-translation systems as well as E. coli and non-model bacteria naturally harboring these systems.

Beisels overall research goal is to use CRISPR technologies to improve the understanding of human infections and to develop diagnostic tools and customized therapeutic approaches.To further connect and foster collaborations among the global research community working on CRISPR technologies and synthetic biology, he organized several international scientific events, like the CRISPR Conference in Würzburg (2023).

== Other activities ==
In 2021, Beisel's research group developed the CRISPR-based diagnostic platform LEOPARD together with JMU scientist Cynthia Sharma. LEOPARD is capable of identifying multiple RNA and DNA biomarkers in a simple point-of-care test. Beisel used this same technology to develop the first approach for the programmable recording of RNA in single cells, which his group has dubbed TIGER.

Based on those developments Beisel co-founded Leopard Biosciences, a start-up company commercializing the diagnostic platform LEOPARD and developing point-of-care molecular diagnostics, where he serves as chief scientific officer. Since 2019, he has been a member of the scientific advisory board of Benson Hill, a seed company using CRISPR-based tools that is based in St. Louis, Montana, USA. In 2015, Beisel co-founded Locus Biosciences, a clinical-stage antimicrobial company based in Morrisville, North Carolina, USA.

== Prizes and awards ==
Chase Beisel has received several awards and grants for his research, such as the 2024 RNA Society Mid-Career Award, the 2024 European Union ERC Proof of Concept Grant and the 2022 Pettenkofer Prize.

== Selected publications ==
- Dmytrenko O, Neumann GC, Hallmark T, Keiser DJ, Crowley VM, Vialetto E, Mougiakos I, Wandera KG, Domgaard H, Weber J, Gaudin T, Metcalf J, Gray BN, Begemann MB#, Jackson RN#, Beisel CL# (2023). Cas12a2 elicits abortive infection through RNA-triggered destruction of dsDNA. Nature 613(7944):588–594 DOI:10.1038/s41586-022-05559-3
- Jiao C, Reckstadt C, König F, Homberger C, Yu J, Vogel J, Westermann AJ, Sharma CM, Beisel CL (2023). RNA recording in single bacterial cells using reprogrammed tracrRNAs. Nature Biotechnology 41(8):1107–1116 DOI:10.1038/s41587-022-01604-8
- Wimmer F*, Mougiakos I*, Englert F, Beisel CL (2022). Rapid cell-free characterization of multi-subunit CRISPR effectors and transposons. Molecular Cell 82(6):1210–1224.e6 DOI:10.1016/j.molcel.2022.01.026
- Liao C, Sharma S*, Svensson SL*, Kibe A*, Weinberg Z*, Alkhnbashi OS, Bischler T, Backofen R, Caliskan N, Sharma CM, Beisel CL (2022). Spacer prioritization in CRISPR-Cas9 immunity is enabled by the leader RNA. Nature Microbiology 7(4):530–541 DOI:10.1038/s41564-022-01074-3
- Jiao C, Sharma S*, Dugar G*, Peeck NL, Bischler T, Wimmer F, Yu Y, Barquist L, Schoen C, Kurzai O, Sharma CM#, Beisel CL# (2021). Noncanonical crRNAs derived from host transcripts enable multiplexable RNA detection by Cas9. Science 372(6545):941–948 DOI:10.1126/science.abe7106
