= John Douglas Simon =

American academic

14th President of Lehigh University
- Former President
- In office July 1, 2015 – June 30, 2021
- Preceded by: Alice Gast

Personal details
- Born: February 11, 1957 (age 69) Cincinnati, Ohio
- Spouse: Diane Szaflarski
- Education: Williams College, 1979; Harvard University, 1983
- Profession: University President, Academic, Researcher
- Website: http://www.lehigh.edu/president

John D. Simon (born February 11, 1957) was the 14th President of Lehigh University in Bethlehem, Pennsylvania from July 1, 2015 to June 30, 2021. He previously served as executive vice president and provost at the University of Virginia.

== Background ==
Born in 1957, Simon received his B.A. in Chemistry from Williams College in 1979 and his Ph.D. from Harvard University in 1983. After a postdoctoral fellowship at UCLA, he joined the Department of Chemistry and Biochemistry at the University of California-San Diego in 1985, and then moved to Duke University as the George B. Geller Professor in 1998.

Simon's research interests for the past decade have been focused on understanding the structure and function of human pigmentation. Most recently, he has been collaborating with scientists from around the world to study the only known intact pigments recovered from the Jurassic period.

Simon is married to Diane Szaflarski, an associate professor in Virginia's School of Nursing.

== Presidency of Lehigh University ==
Simon was officially installed as Lehigh's 14th president during the university's annual Founder's Day ceremony in early October, 2015. The historic celebration also marked Lehigh's Sesquicentennial.

In his installment speech, Simon said he was advancing an ambitious agenda with the support of the Board of Trustees, who committed to an investment of $250 million in institutional resources in the areas of teaching, learning, research and student life. This investment will support a comprehensive plan that will strengthen Lehigh, allow the university to leverage core strengths and build a university that will serve the needs of students and society of the future.

Simon said the funds will be used to:

- assure that Lehigh's financial and merit aid packages attract the best students to the university, regardless of their financial situation;
- re-imagine the University Center, and address the university's aging physical plant, especially its laboratory and technical infrastructure;
- deepen the university's commitment to the hallmarks of a Lehigh education, one that stresses innovation, integration, and entrepreneurship at all levels; and
- globalize Lehigh's campus, to assure the university's graduates are educated about the world, acquiring the knowledge, skills and experiences to prepare them to lead in tackling the complex global issues of their generation.

The selection of John D. Simon as Lehigh's 14th president was announced in October, 2014, by Brad Eric Scheler, chair of Lehigh's Board of Trustees. The announcement followed the departure of Alice P. Gast, who was named president of Imperial College, London, earlier that year. Simon was immediately preceded at Lehigh by Kevin L. Clayton, a member of the Board of Trustees, and retired director and former principal of Oaktree Management, a global investment organization. Clayton served as Lehigh's interim president from August 2014 to June 2015.

Simon began chronicling his experiences as Lehigh's 14th president through his Instagram account

=== Bold Plan for the Future ===
Shortly after introducing a bold plan for the growth of Lehigh, Simon was featured in an article in Inside Higher Ed that noted he "wasted relatively little time in his tenure before launching an aggressive expansion plan." Just 15 months after starting at Lehigh, the article noted, Simon's Board of Trustees approved a plan to expand Lehigh's 5,100-student undergraduate enrollment by 20 percent, boost its 2,000-student graduate enrollment up by 40 percent, hire additional faculty members and start a new college concentrating on health. "I think people these days expect that you're going to do something sooner rather than later," Simon was quoted as saying. "The idea that you can go on a yearlong listening tour – I don't think anyone has that long anymore."

Simon noted in the article that some of the pieces of the plan were in place when he came to Lehigh. He referenced his previous experience as provost of the University of Virginia, which informed his approach to the Lehigh presidency. "If you want to change anything, you have to get it started pretty soon, because you don't have a large window," he said. "I think to drive change, to sustain change and do something, it takes five to 10 years. And that's all you've got."

In an article that appeared in the Allentown, Pa. Morning Call in October 2016, Simon said that the "Path to Prominence" plan he is proposing will allow Lehigh to stand among the best in higher education for years to come. "This is an ambitious plan that builds on our historic strengths and honors the core values that have made Lehigh such a special place," the article quoted Simon as saying. In the Morning Call article, President Simon and Lehigh Provost Patrick V. Farrell said the plan will take a decade to fully implement, although one of the first goals is to establish the health college. It would be Lehigh's fifth college. Other proposed developments include the construction of a new science and research building, upgrades to existing science and research spaces, and the renovation of the University Center, which is located in the heart of Lehigh's South Mountain campus.

=== Campaign for Lehigh ===
In October 2018, under Simon's leadership, Lehigh University publicly launched a $1 billion campaign to support a large number of initiatives, including campus construction, financial aid and the university's new health college. The on-campus campaign launch event featured a concert by pop singer Halsey, and was followed by events in New York City and San Francisco. Included in construction plans was a $70 million renovation and expansion of the University Center, funded in part by a $20 million gift from Lehigh graduate and Board of Trustees Chairman Kevin A. Clayton and his wife, Lisa.

In April 2019, Lehigh alumnus and board member Jordan Hitch and his wife, Julie, gifted the university $5 million in support of a cluster of new student residences under construction near the University Center. "The expansion of our student body will bring new dynamism and greater diversity to campus. Hitch House will be an integrated living and learning space and will inspire community, creativity, and collaboration," Simon said.

=== Efforts Toward Increasing Diversity on Campus ===
In a 2017 HuffPost op-ed, Simon outlined the importance of providing broader access to higher education and Lehigh's efforts to address the issue of inequity, which include making available more than $84 million in grants and scholarships; a commitment to meet 100 percent of every student's demonstrated financial need; the creation of an Office of Diversity, Equity and Community; participation in the American Talent Initiative and the Posse Foundation; and the creation of the position of Director for Student Access and Success. "Historically, Lehigh has always ranked high on its transformative potential for its students. Our data on post-graduate success and external surveys and rankings confirm the impact this degree can have on a student's life trajectory. At this critical moment, it must be – and is – an institutional imperative to make certain that opportunity extends to all," Simon wrote.

== Executive leadership at Virginia ==
During his tenure as executive vice president and provost at the University of Virginia, Simon spearheaded a number of global initiatives, including the establishment of a new major in global studies and the opening of a physical presence for the university in Asia. He played a leading role in the launch of the University of Virginia's Data Science Institute as well as its Advanced Research Institute, and in creating the university's Endowment for the Arts. He also appointed several of the University of Virginia's deans and oversaw the hiring of several hundred faculty.

In an article published in the Washington Post, John Simon was credited with courageous leadership during a crisis set in motion by the sudden announcement that the University of Virginia President Theresa Sullivan was stepping down. The article described Simon as "angered and baffled by the decision, but it was unclear where this brewing crisis was headed and whether he could do anything to change its course. The stance he took, and the words he spoke, were risky and bold. They would, in the end, solidify his reputation with the faculty and add momentum to the movement that eventually swept Sullivan back into the presidency."

== Academic career ==
Prior to his time at the University of Virginia, Simon served as vice provost of academic affairs at Duke University from 2005 to 2011. At Duke, he guided the university's strategic planning process and drove initiatives aimed at connecting the humanities, social sciences, and sciences. He was chairman of Duke's department of chemistry from 1999 to 2004, and also held appointments in the Duke University Medical Center in both biochemistry and ophthalmology.

Simon has been the recipient of numerous fellowships and awards for his scientific work, including the Presidential Young Investigator Award, Alfred P. Sloan Fellowship, Camille and Henry Dreyfus Teacher Scholar Award, and the Fresenius Award. He is a fellow of the American Association for the Advancement of Science and the American Physical Society, and has authored or co-authored nearly 250 academic papers and four books. In June 2019, the faculty of biochemistry, biophysics and biotechnology at Jagiellonian University in Kraków, Poland awarded Simon a silver Plus ratio quam vis medal for his role in collaborative research between Polish and American scientists while Simon was at Duke University.

== Additional references ==
Web. John D. Simon, Duke Scientist and Vice Provost for Academic Affairs, To Become University of Virginia's Executive Vice President and Provost University of Virginia, retrieved August 24, 2011. Web. John D. Simon, Executive Vice President & Provost University of Virginia, retrieved August 13, 2012.
