= Thomas Lectka =

American organic chemist, academic and researcher

- Born: Detroit, Michigan
- Occupations: Organic chemist, academic and researcher
- Title: Jean and Norman Scowe Professor of Chemistry
- Awards: NSF Career Award; Camille Dreyfus Teacher-Scholar Award; ACS Maryland Chemist of the Year

Academic background
- Education: B.A. in chemistry Ph.D. in organic chemistry
- Alma mater: Oberlin College; Cornell University

Academic work
- Institutions: Johns Hopkins University

Thomas Lectka is an American organic chemist, academic and researcher. He is Jean and Norman Scowe Professor of Chemistry and leads the Lectka Group at Johns Hopkins University.

Lectka specializes in areas of catalysis in synthetic and mechanistic organic chemistry and has authored over 120 research publications. He has made contributions in the discovery of metal-catalyzed amide isomerization; the development of first practical method for the catalytic, asymmetric synthesis of beta-lactams; the synthesis of [C-F-C] fluoronium ions; and site-selective aliphatic fluorination.

== Education ==
Lectka completed his bachelor's in chemistry and graduated from Oberlin College in 1985. He completed his doctoral degree in organic chemistry from Cornell University in 1991. He then completed his postdoctoral studies as an Alexander von Humboldt Postdoctoral Fellow at the University of Heidelberg in Germany and then as a National Institutes of Health Postdoctoral Fellow at Harvard University.

== Career ==
Following his postdoctoral fellowship at Harvard University, Lectka joined Johns Hopkins University as an assistant professor of chemistry in 1994. He was promoted to associate professor in 1999 and to professor in 2002. In 2012, he was appointed as the Jean and Norman Scowe Professor of Chemistry at Johns Hopkins University.

== Research ==
Lectka's research expertise lies in areas of catalysis in synthetic and mechanistic organic chemistry. He has contributed to the discovery of metal-catalyzed amide isomerization, and metal-catalyzed alkane fluorination, along with the development of first practical method for the catalytic, asymmetric synthesis of β-lactams.

During his studies at Cornell University from 1986 until 1991, Lectka focused on the design, synthesis, and study of stable carbocations with three-center, two-electron [C-H-C] bonds; and discussed the chemical shift of central hydrogen by the progressively smaller bond angles. He also studied alkane protonolysis leading to stoichiometric hydrogen evolution, MO theory of three-center bonding, and titanium promoted carbonyl coupling reactions. He investigated the reproducibility problems caused by the age, history and source of titanium chloride and introduced an optimized procedure that provided reproducibly high yields. Lectka continued his research on MO theory and photoelectron spectroscopy during his fellowship at Heidelberg University.

As a fellow at Harvard University, he focused on the asymmetric catalysis of the Diels-Alder reaction using bisoxazoline and bisimine Lewis acid complexes. After joining Johns Hopkins University in 1994, Lectka conducted research on new catalytic and asymmetric reactions, along with enantioselective reactions of imines, quinones and amides catalyzed by chiral Lewis acids and nucleophiles; such as catalytic, asymmetric synthesis of β-lactams; and nonnatural α- and β-amino acids. He presented the mechanism of the β-lactam development with proton sponge as the stoichiometric base, and also discussed the kinetic analysis of the catalyzed reaction of alkenes with α-imino esters.

Lectka has studied the transition-metal catalyzed amide isomerization and peptide folding. He presented the first spectroscopic and crystallographic proof of copper(II)-sodium coordination in tertiary amides and discussed the role of side chain in substituted prolines as a binding site for copper. Lectka's research during his term at Johns Hopkins University also focused on enantioselective halogenation, cooperative asymmetric catalysis, the medicinal chemistry of fluorinated molecules, and studies on asymmetric catalysis on sequentially-linked columns leading to synthesis machines.

He conducted research on the chemistry of [C-F-C] fluoronium ions and later reported first spectroscopic evidence for fluoronium ions in a solution. Lectka has also worked on metal-catalyzed aliphatic fluorination and site-selective aliphatic fluorination.

Lectka has also established the use of fluorine as a through-space activating substituent for aromatic substitution.

== Awards and honors ==
- 1988-1990 - Wentink Award for Graduate Student of the Year, Cornell University
- 1991-1992 - Alexander von Humboldt Fellowship for Study in Germany
- 1997 - NIH First Award
- 1998 - NSF Career Award
- 1998 - Eli Lilly Young Investigator Grantee
- 1999 - DuPont Young Investigator Award
- 1999 - Camille Dreyfus Teacher-Scholar Award
- 2000 - Alfred Sloan Foundation Fellow
- 2002 - Merck Faculty Development Award
- 2003-2004 - John Simon Guggenheim Memorial Fellow
- 2017 - ACS Maryland Chemist of the Year
