= Christos Georgakis =

American chemical engineer

Christos Georgakis is an American chemical engineer, currently a distinguished professor at Tufts University and also a Fellow to the American Association for the Advancement of Science, International Federation of Automatic Control and American Institute of Chemical Engineers. He was previously the du Pont Professor, 1975–76, and Edgerton Professor, 1977–79, at Massachusetts Institute of Technology, the Iacocca Professor at Lehigh University from 2001 to 2002, Othmer Professor at New York University Tandon School of Engineering from 2002 to 2003.

== Education ==
- Ph.D., University of Minnesota, 1975
- M.S., University of Illinois, 1972
- ChE Diploma, National Technical University of Athens, 1970
