= Hong Yong Sohn =

American engineer

Hong Yong Sohn is an American engineer, currently a Distinguished Professor in Metallurgical Engineering at the University of Utah.

Sohn received his B.S. degree from Seoul National University, South Korea, and his Ph.D. degree in chemical engineering in 1970 from the University of California at Berkeley. After working as a research engineer at Du Pont’s Engineering Technology Laboratory, he joined the Department of Metallurgical Engineering at the University of Utah in 1974.

Professor Sohn's work has been recognized through various awards, which include:

- The 2014 Educator Award from The Minerals, Metals & Materials Society (TMS)
- The 2012 Distinguished Scholarly and Creative Research Award from the University of Utah
- The 2012 Billiton Gold Medal from the Institute of Materials, Minerals and Mining, U.K.
- The TMS 2009 Fellow Award, "in recognition of outstanding contribution to the practice of metallurgical/materials science and technology" from TMS
- The 2001 James Douglas Gold Medal Award ("for leadership and outstanding contributions in research and education of non-ferrous extractive metallurgy and for work related to the modeling of gas-solid reactors and the development of novel solvent extraction systems") from the American Institute of Mining, Metallurgical, and Petroleum Engineers (AIME)
- The 1998 Fellow Award from the Korean Academy of Science and Technology
- The 1993 TMS Champion H. Mathewson Gold Medal Award “for the most notable contribution to Metallurgical Science in the 3–year period”
- The 1990 TMS Extractive Metallurgy Lecturer Award “in recognition as an outstanding scientific leader in the field of nonferrous extraction and processing metallurgy”
- The TMS Extraction and Processing Science Award (1990, 1994, 1999 and 2007)
- Fulbright Distinguished Lecturer (1983)
- The Camille and Henry Dreyfus Foundation Teacher-Scholar Award (1977).
- In 2006, TMS honored Dr. Sohn by holding the Sohn International Symposium on Advanced Processing of Metals and Materials.

Dr. Sohn has authored or co-authored 4 monographs, 25 book chapters, some 500 papers, co-edited 17 books, holds 5 patents, and has delivered some 240 invited lectures. He has served as a Director of TMS-AIME (The Minerals, Metals and Materials Society), organized many international symposia, and delivered numerous plenary and keynote lectures. He was a U.S. DOE Fossil Energy Lecturer from 1978–81, and is an advisor to LS-Nikko Co., South Korea, and to the Korea Institute of Geoscience and Mineral Resources (KIGAM). He serves on several editorial/advisory boards of international journals.
