= Alexander M. Spokoyny =

American chemist

- Education: University of California, Los Angeles; Northwestern University
- Scientific career
- Institutions: California NanoSystems Institute; University of California, Los Angeles
- Doctoral advisor: Chad Mirkin

Alexander M. Spokoyny is an American chemist and a professor in chemistry and biochemistry at UCLA and a faculty member of the California NanoSystems Institute (CNSI). He is currently a department chair of Chemistry and Biochemistry at UCLA.

== Education ==
Spokoyny has started his research career as an undergraduate student at UCLA working in the laboratory of M. Frederick Hawthorne. He received his Ph.D. degree in 2011 from Northwestern University in inorganic and materials chemistry working with Chad Mirkin. Spokoyny then conducted a post-doctoral research stint at MIT in chemical biology until 2014 working jointly with Stephen L. Buchwald and Bradley L. Pentelute on peptide stapling and organometallic bioconjugation chemistry.

== Career ==
Spokoyny group's research encompasses an interdisciplinary approach focusing on pressing problems in chemistry, biology and materials science with emphasis on developing new molecular cluster chemistry. Spokoyny has also been involved in teaching at California prison facilities as a part of UCLA Prison Education program.

== Awards ==
Spokoyny is a recipient of multiple national and international awards including:

- American Chemical Society Inorganic Young Investigator Award (2011)
- International Union of Pure and Applied Chemistry (IUPAC) Prize for Young Chemists (2012)
- 3M Non-Tenured Faculty Award (2016)
- Chemical and Engineering News (C&EN) Talented 12 (2016)
- Maximizing Investigator’s Research Award (MIRA) from the NIH (2017)
- Alfred P. Sloan Research Fellowship (2017)
- Cottrell Scholar from Research Corporation for Science Advancement (2018)
- NSF CAREER Award (2019)
- Thieme Chemistry Journal Award (2020)
- Camille Dreyfus Teacher-Scholar Award (2020)
