= Michael Trenary =

American chemist

Michael Trenary is an American chemist currently Professor at University of Illinois at Chicago. His interests are chemical and surface reaction mechanisms. He was Elected as Fellow at the American Vacuum Society in 2002, American Association for the Advancement of Science in 2009 and American Chemical Society in 2011.

== Education ==
He earned his B.S. at University of California, Berkeley in 1978 and his Ph.D at Massachusetts Institute of Technology in 1982. He's also taught at Waseda University and Tohoku University.

== Selected publications ==
- Islam, A.; Abdel-Rahman, M. K.; Trenary, M., Heat of Adsorption of Propyne on Cu(111) from Isotherms Measured by Reflection Absorption Infrared Spectroscopy. J Phys Chem C 2021, 125 (34), 18786-18791.
- Islam, A.; Molina, D. L.; Trenary, M., Adsorption of acrolein and its hydrogenation products on Cu(111). Phys. Chem. Chem. Phys. 2022, 24 (39), 24383-24393.
- Christopher M. Kruppe, Joel D. Krooswyk, and Michael Trenary, “Polarization dependent infrared spectroscopy of adsorbed carbon monoxide as a probe of the Pd/Cu(111) single atom alloy surface”, J. Phys. Chem. C, 121, 9361-9369 (2017). DOI: 10.1021/acs.jpcc.7b01227
- Dominic A. Esan, Yuan D. Ren, Xu Feng, and Michael Trenary, “Adsorption and hydrogenation of acrolein on Ru(001)”, J. Phys. Chem. C, 121, 4384-4392 (2017) DOI: 10.1021/acs.jpcc.6b12678.
- Yuan Ren, Dominic Esan, Iradwikanari Waluyo, Joel D. Krooswyk, and Michael Trenary, “Spectroscopic identification of surface intermediates in the decomposition of methylamine on Ru(001)”, J. Phys. Chem. C, 121, 9424-9432 (2017). DOI: 10.1021/acs.jpcc.7b02092.
- Emiko Kazuma, Jaehoon Jung, Hiromu Ueba, Michael Trenary, and Yousoo Kim, “A direct pathway of molecular photodissociation with visible light on metal surfaces”, J. Am. Chem. Soc. 139, 3115-3121 (2017) DOI: 10.1021/jacs.6b12680.
- Dominic Esan and Michael Trenary, Physical Chemistry Chemical Physics, “Surface Chemistry of propanal, 2-propenol, and 1-propanol on Ru(001)”, Phys. Chem. Chem. Phys., 19, 10870-10877 (2017). DOI: 10.1039/c6cp08893g.
- Xu Feng, Mohammed K. Abdel-Rahman, Christopher M. Kruppe, Michael Trenary, “Deposition and Characterization of Stoichiometric Films of V2O5 on Pd(111)”, Surf. Sci., 664, 1-7 (2017). DOI: 10.1016/j.susc.2017.05.004.
