= William Carl Lineberger =

American chemist (1939–2023)

William Carl Lineberger (December 5, 1939 – October 17, 2023) was an American chemist.

== Life and career ==
A native of Hamlet, North Carolina, William Carl Lineberger was born to parents Caleb Henry and Evelyn Pelot Cooper Lineberger on December 5, 1939. His mother was a former teacher and his father was a railroad worker. Through his mother, Lineberger is of French Huguenot descent. As a child, Lineberger was a Boy Scout and made Eagle rank. After completing his bachelor's, master's and doctoral degrees at the Georgia Institute of Technology, Lineberger began teaching at his alma mater, leaving for a research position at the U. S. Army Ballistic Research Laboratory and later the Joint Institute for Laboratory Astrophysics. The University of Colorado at Boulder, one of two joint operators of JILA, hired Lineberger as an assistant professor in 1970. He was named E. U. Condon Distinguished Professor of Chemistry at the University of Colorado in 1985.

Over the course of his career, Lineberger received several awards. Among them are: the Herbert P. Broida Prize (1981) awarded by the American Physical Society, the Earle K. Plyler Prize for Molecular Spectroscopy (1992), Irving Langmuir Award (1996) and Peter Debye Award (2004) of the American Chemical Society, and the William F. Meggers Award in Spectroscopy (1989) from the Optical Society of America. Lineberger received the NAS Award in Chemical Sciences in 2015. Lineberger was a member of the American Chemical Society as well as the National Academy of Sciences (1983) and American Academy of Arts and Sciences (1995). He was a fellow of the American Association for the Advancement of Science and the American Physical Society (1973). From 2011 to 2016, Lineberger served on the National Science Board and was nominated for a second term by Barack Obama in 2016.

Lineberger died on October 17, 2023, at the age of 83.
