= Ryoji Noyori Prize =

Japanese chemistry award

The Ryoji Noyori Prize was established by the Society of Synthetic Organic Chemistry, Japan in 2002 to commemorate Ryōji Noyori winning the 101st Nobel Prize in Chemistry as well as the 60th anniversary of the Society of Synthetic Organic Chemistry. The prize is given "to recognize and encourage outstanding contributions to research in asymmetric synthetic chemistry defined in its broadest sense." The prize is sponsored by Takasago International Corporation.

== Prizewinners ==
Source: Noyori Prize winners

- 2002 – Henri B. Kagan
- 2003 – Gilbert Stork
- 2004 – Dieter Seebach
- 2005 – Tsutomu Katsuki
- 2006 – David A. Evans
- 2007 – Tamio Hayashi
- 2008 – Andreas Pfaltz
- 2009 – Yoshio Okamoto
- 2010 – Eric N. Jacobsen
- 2011 – Hisashi Yamamoto
- 2012 – Masakatsu Shibasaki
- 2013 – Barry Trost
- 2014 – Dieter Enders
- 2015 – Larry E. Overman
- 2016 – Keiji Maruoka
- 2017 – David MacMillan
- 2018 – Yoshito Kishi
- 2019 – Scott E. Denmark
- 2020 – Tsuneo Imamoto
- 2021 – Erick M. Carreira
- 2022 - Gregory C. Fu
- 2023 - Kenso Soai
- 2024 - Thorsten Bach
- 2025 - Manfred Reetz

== See also ==
- List of chemistry awards
- List of prizes named after people
