= Arthur Joseph Hill =

American organic chemist

Arthur Joseph Hill (1888–1964) was an American organic chemist and academic who served as Whitehead Professor Emeritus at Yale University.

== Biography ==
Born in Meriden, Connecticut, Hill earned a B.A. from Yale University in 1910 and a Ph.D. there in 1913. He joined Yale's faculty shortly thereafter, became a full professor by 1925, and later chaired the chemistry department.

In 1942, while directing Yale's Sterling Chemistry Laboratory, he was appointed to the newly established Whitehead Chair, created through Conkey P. Whitehead's 1940 bequest to support chemistry research. Hill became professor emeritus in 1956.

During World War I, Hill served with the Yale chemical warfare unit of the U.S. Army, and during World War II he worked with the Manhattan Project Office of Scientific Research and Development.

Hill was a member of the New York Academy of Science, American Chemical Society, American Institute of Chemists, Electrochemical Society, American Association for the Advancement of Science, and Sigma Xi. He also served as a trustee of the American Journal of Science and was on the editorial board of the Journal of Organic Chemistry.
