= Peter J. Stang =

American chemist

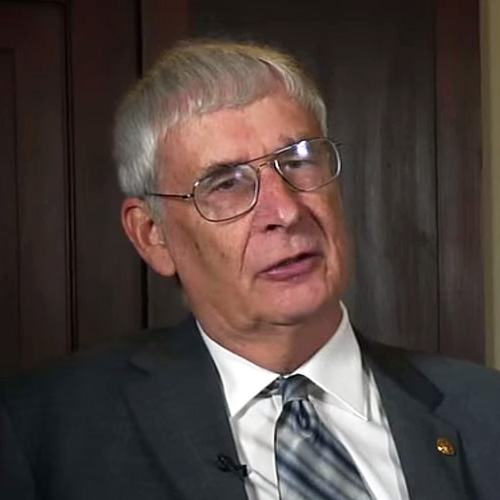
- Born: November 17, 1941 (age 84); Nuremberg, Germany
- Citizenship: American
- Education: DePaul University; UC Berkeley
- Awards: Priestley Medal; National Medal of Science; F.A. Cotton Medal for Excellence in Chemical Research; Linus Pauling Award
- Scientific career
- Fields: Organic chemistry
- Workplaces: Princeton University; University of Utah
- Thesis: Kinetics and Mechanism of Boron Fluoride-Alcohol Alkylations (1966)
- Doctoral advisor: Andrew Streitwieser

Peter John Stang (born November 17, 1941) is an American chemist and Distinguished Professor of chemistry at the University of Utah. He was the editor-in-chief of the Journal of the American Chemical Society from 2002 to 2020.

== Biography ==
Stang discusses his contributions to the field of chemistry, as well as his dedication to public service.

Peter Stang was born in Nuremberg, Germany to a German mother and Hungarian father. He lived in Hungary for most of his adolescence. In school, he took rigorous mathematics and science courses. At home, he made black gunpowder from ingredients at the drugstore, and developed a pH indicator from the juice of red cabbage that his mother cooked, and sold to his "fellow chemists".

In 1956, when Stang was in the middle of his sophomore year in high school, he and his family fled the Soviet invasion of Hungary and immigrated to Chicago, Illinois. Not speaking English, Stang failed his American history and English courses but scored at the top of his class in science and math. His teachers were confused by his performance and gave him an IQ test. Stang was confused by the unfamiliar format of the test and scored a 78. In spite of this, Stang was admitted to DePaul University and earned his undergraduate degree in 1963. He received his Ph.D. in 1966 from the University of California, Berkeley.

After spending a year in as a NIH Postdoctoral Fellow at Princeton University with Paul Schleyer, Stang joined the chemistry faculty at the University of Utah in 1969. He became dean of the College of Science in 1997, during which he established the John E. and Marva M. Warnock Endowed Chair in Mathematics, and oversaw construction and dedication of the new David M. Grant NMR Center in 2006. He stepped down as dean in 2007. He is a member of the National Academy of Sciences. He was editor-in-chief of the Journal of Organic Chemistry from 2000 to 2001. In 2013 he was awarded the American Chemical Society Priestley Medal. He served as editor in chief of the Journal of the American Chemical Society from 2002 to 2020, succeeded in 2021 by Erick M. Carreira.

== Research interests ==
Stang's research has focused on designing, and synthesizing, small organic molecules which self-assemble into larger geometric shapes with potential applications as nano-devices, shape-selective catalysts, and molecular agents for separation by chelation and chromatography.

== Awards and honors ==
- Elected to Utah Academy of Engineering and Science (2021)
- American Institute of Chemists Gold Medal (2020)
- Priestley Medal, (2013)
- National Medal of Science, (2010)
- Paul G. Gassman Distinguished Service Award of the ACS Division of Organic Chemistry, (2010)
- F.A. Cotton Medal for Excellence in Chemical Research of the American Chemical Society (2010)
- Honorary Professor CAS Institute of Chemistry, Beijing, Zheijiang U; East China Normal U and East China U of Science and Technology, (2010)
- Fred Basolo Medal for Outstanding Research in Inorganic Chemistry, (2009)
- Foreign Member of the Hungarian Academy of Sciences, (2007)
- ACS Award for Creative Research and Applications of Iodine Chemistry, (2007)
- Linus Pauling Award, (2006)
- Foreign Member of the Chinese Academy of Sciences (2006)
- Fellow of the American Academy of Arts and Sciences (2002)
- Member of the National Academy of Sciences.
- ACS George A. Olah Award in Hydrocarbon or Petroleum Chemistry, (2003)
- Member, AAAS Board of Directors, (2003–2007)
- Robert W. Parry Teaching Award, (2000)
- ACS James Flack Norris Award in Physical Organic Chemistry, (1998)
- University of Utah Rosemblatt Prize for Excellence, (1995)
- Utah Award in Chemistry, American Chemical Society, (1994)
- Utah Governor's Medal for Science and Technology, (1993)
- Honorary Doctorate of Science (D. Sc. honoris causa) Moscow State University, Moscow, Russia (1992)
- Fulbright Senior Scholar, (1987–1988)
- Univ. of Utah Distinguished Research Award, (1987)
- Fellow AAAS, JSPS Fellow (1985, 1998)
- Lady Davis Fellowship (Visiting Professor), Technion, Israel, (1986, 1997)
- Humboldt "Senior U.S. Scientist" Award, (1977, 1996, 2010)
- Associate editor, Journal of the American Chemical Society (1982–1999)
- National Organic Symposium Executive Officer (1985)
