= Sukbok Chang =

South Korean chemist (born 1962)

- 장석복
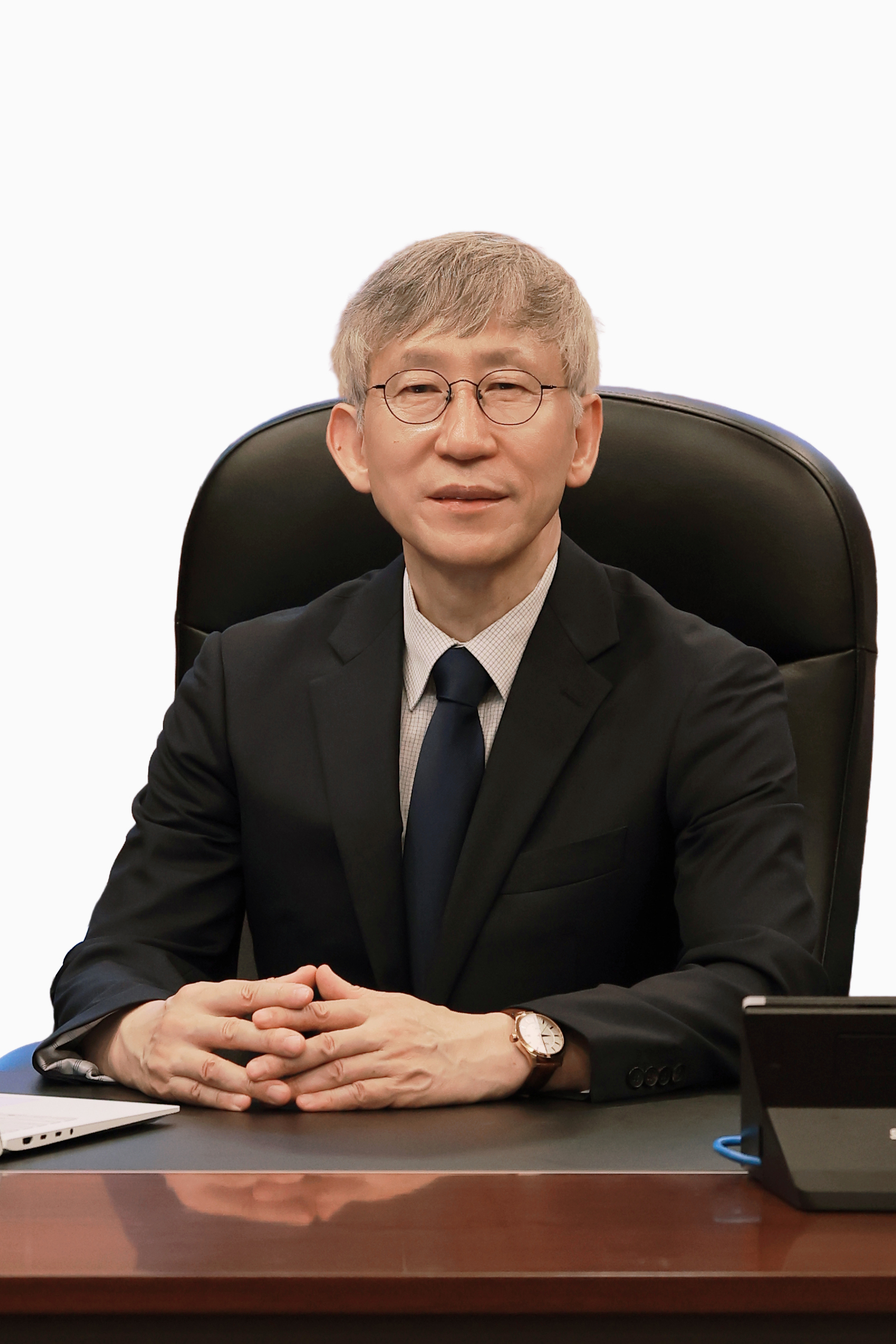
- Born: August 1, 1962
- Education: Korea University, KAIST, Harvard University
- Awards: Top Scientist and Technologist Award of Korea (2019), Highly Cited Researcher (2015-2019), Korea Science Award (2013)
- Scientific career
- Workplaces: Caltech, Ewha Womans University, KAIST, Institute for Basic Science
- Doctoral advisor: Eric Jacobsen

Korean name
- Hangul: 장석복
- Hanja: 張碩福
- RR: Jang Seokbok
- MR: Chang Sŏkpok

Sukbok Chang (Korean: 장석복; born August 1, 1962) is a South Korean organic chemist. He is a distinguished professor in the Department of Chemistry at Korea Advanced Institute of Science and Technology (KAIST). He is also the director of the Institute for Basic Science (IBS) Center for Catalytic Hydrocarbon Functionalizations (CCHF). He is the fourth president of IBS and the first to serve in the role after first being a principal investigator at that institute.

He was an associate editor on ACS Catalysis and has served on the editorial advisory boards of The Journal of Organic Chemistry, Journal of the American Chemical Society, and Accounts of Chemical Research. His major research interest is transition metal catalyzed C-H bond functionalization for the carbon-carbon bond and carbon-heteroatom bond formation.

== Career ==
Sukbok Chang received his B.S degree from Korea University in 1985, and M.S degree from KAIST in 1987. Then, he joined Eric N. Jacobsen's group and received his PhD in 1996 at Harvard University. He subsequently worked with Robert H. Grubbs at Caltech as a postdoctoral fellow from 1996 to 1998. In early 1998, he joined the faculty of Ewha Womans University as an assistant professor, and moved to KAIST as a full professor in 2002. In 2012, he was selected as a director of the Center for Catalytic Hydrocarbon Functionalizations at the Institute for Basic Science, which is the biggest Korean government funded research institute. He also has been working as an associate editor of the journal ACS Catalysis since 2015. In 2023, he was selected to co-run the KAIST Cross Generation Creation Lab, a laboratory designed to continue the know-how of professors about to retire through collaboration with younger professors.

In mid 2026, he was appointed president of the Institute for Basic Science where he will serve a five-year term.

== Major contributions ==
Chang's group studies new organic reactions and mechanisms with transition metal catalysis. In particular, his group contributed to the development of "copper catalyzed multicomponent coupling" in the 2000s. Since 2008, his group has focused on C-H functionalization and made a number of contributions.

=== Copper-catalyzed multicomponent coupling ===
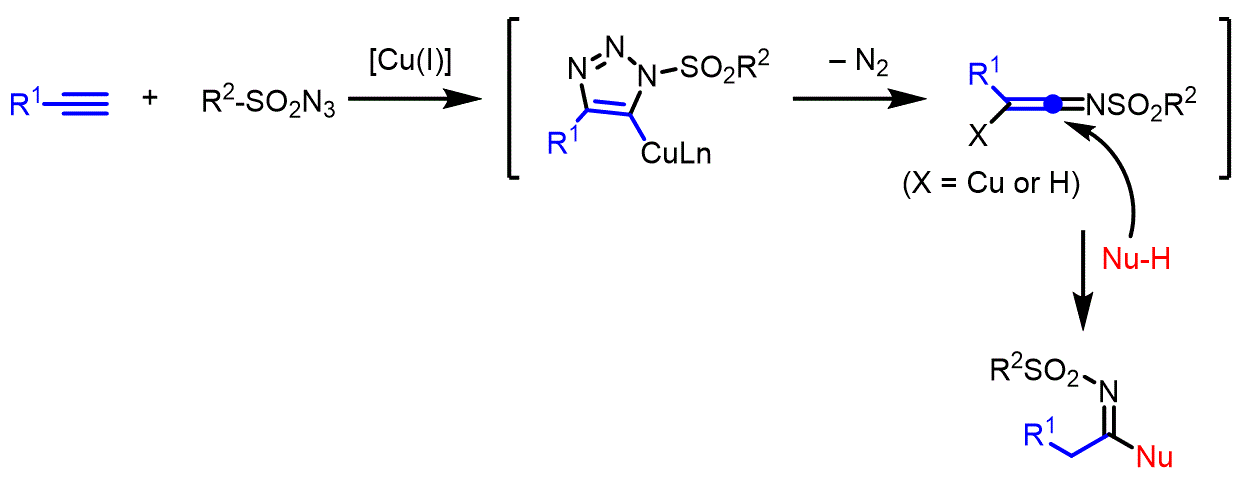

Cu-catalyzed multicomponent coupling is a notable process developed by Chang's group. In 2005, they published a highly efficient and mild catalytic three component coupling between an alkyne, sulfonyl azide, and amine. Unlike click chemistry which generates 1,4-triazoles as products, in this case a Cu(I) catalyst, sulfonyl azide and alkyne generate ketenimine intermediate after releasing N2 gas. This electrophilic ketenimine intermediate reacts with amines and to generate asymmetric imines as products. Chang's group also showed water, alcohols, the C3 position of pyrrole and other nucleophiles can be used in this reaction.

=== Rhodium, Iridium-catalyzed C-N bond formation ===
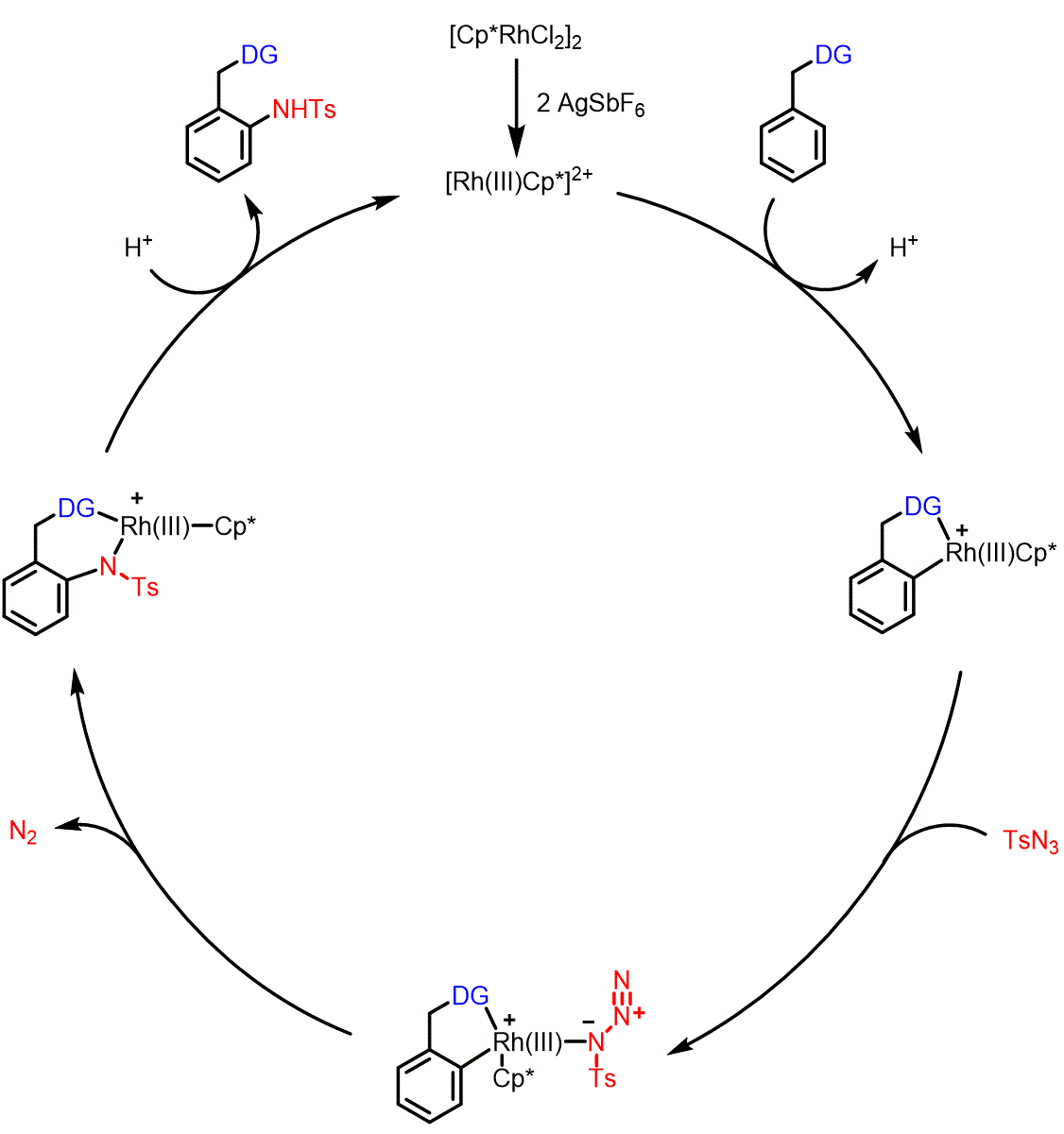

Rhodium or iridium catalyzed C-H amidation and amination are other achievements of his group. In 2012, his group published rhodium catalyzed intermolecular amidation of arenes using sulfonyl azide as a nitrene precursor. This reaction generates N2 as the single byproduct, doesn't need external oxidant, has broad substrate scope and high functional group tolerance. Chang's group advanced their work by using different directing groups, different azides and various substrates. They also published that iridium also works well for C-H amidation/amination.

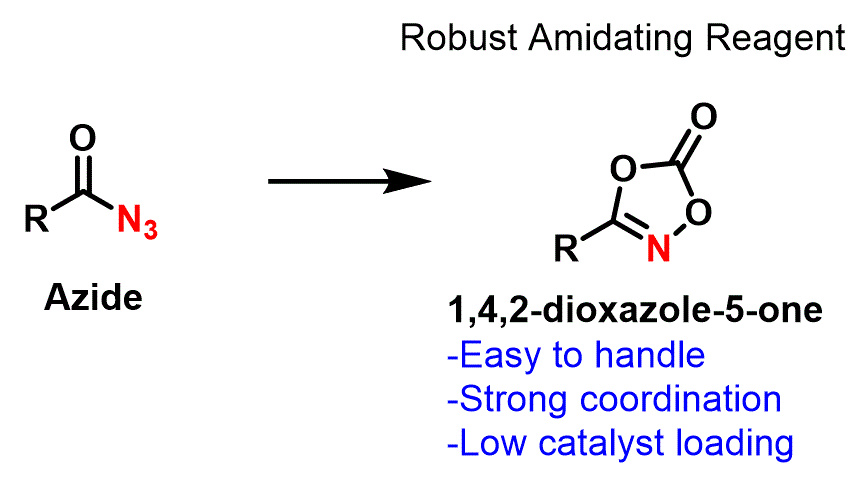

In 2016, Chang's group discovered new nitrogen sources. Their new nitrene precursor, 1,4,2-dioxazol-5-one, is more convenient to prepare, store and use compared to azides. Moreover, it has a strong affinity to the rhodium or Iridium metal center, and thus gives excellent amidation efficiency. They later published selective formation of gamma-lactams via C-H amidation with this type of nucleophile.

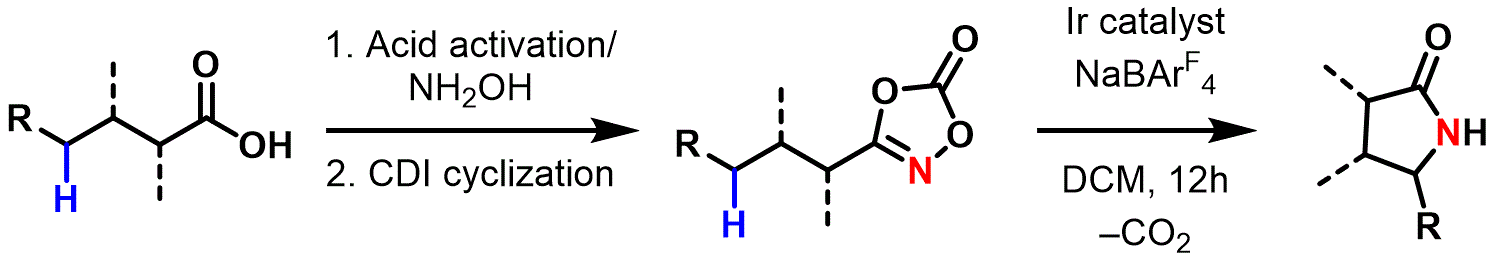
Sukbok Chang's gamma lactam synthesis

== Honors and awards ==
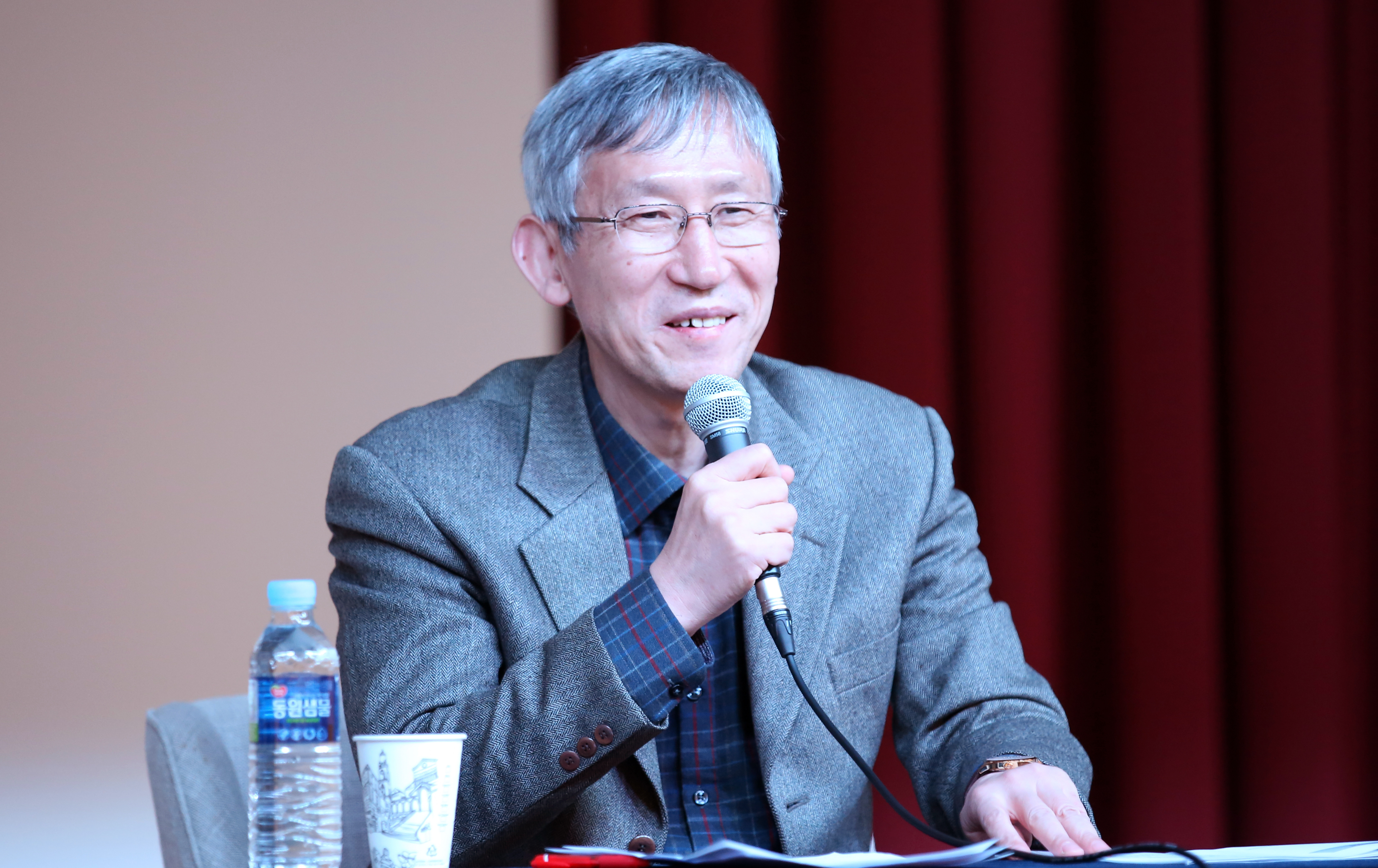
Chang speaking at public event in 2019.

- 2023: Asian Scientist 100, Asian Scientist
- 2022: Ho-Am Prize in Science
- 2019: Top Scientist and Technologist Award of Korea, Korean Federation of Science and Technology Societies (ko)
- 2018: Korea Toray Science Award, Korea Toray Science Foundation
- 2018: JSPS Invitational Fellowship, Japan Society for the Promotion of Science
- 2018: Grand Academic Research Award, KAIST
- 2017: 1st ACS-KCS Excellence Award, American Chemical Society and Korean Chemical Society
- 2017: Humboldt Research Award, Alexander von Humboldt Foundation
- 2016: Yoshida Prize, International Organic Chemistry Foundation
- 2015-2020: Highly Cited Researcher in chemistry, Clarivate Analytics
- 2015: Knowledge Creation Award, Ministry of Science, ICT and Future Planning
- 2014: Member of the Korean Academy of Science and Technology
- 2013: Korea Science Award
- 2013: Kyung-Ahm Prize, Kyung-Ahm Education & Cultural Foundation
- 2010: KCS Academic Award, Korean Chemical Society
- 2008: Star Faculty, Korea Research Foundation
- 2006: One of 50 Representative Research Performances, Korea Science & Engineering Foundation
- 2005: Shim Sang Cheol Award, Korean Chemical Society
- 2003: Thieme Journals Award, Synlett/Synthesis Professorship Award in Asian Area
- 2002: Young Chemist Award, Korean Chemical Society sponsored by WILEY
