= Sarah E. Reisman =

American chemist

- Education: Connecticut College (BA); Yale University (PhD)
- Scientific career
- Fields: Chemistry; Organic Chemistry; Natural product
- Workplaces: California Institute of Technology; Harvard University
- Thesis: Total synthesis of (+/-) Welwitindolinone A isonitrile (2006)
- Doctoral advisor: John L. Wood
- Other academic advisors: Eric Jacobsen
- Website: reismangroup.caltech.edu

Sarah Elizabeth Reisman is the Bren Professor of Chemistry and the Chair of Division of Chemistry and Chemical Engineering at California Institute of Technology. She received the (2013) Arthur C. Cope Scholar Award and the (2014) Tetrahedron Young Investigator Award for Organic Synthesis. Her research focuses on the total synthesis of complex natural products and data-driven developments of asymmetric catalysis.

== Early career and education ==
=== Undergraduate Studies ===
Reisman received a B.A. in chemistry from Connecticut College in 2001, conducting research in the lab of Prof. Timo V. Ovaska on the synthesis of tetracyclic terpenoid natural products, including phorbol.

=== Graduate Studies ===
Reisman obtained her Ph.D. from Yale University in 2006, working with John L. Wood on the total synthesis of (±)-welwitindolinone A isonitrile. Reisman's work included methodological developments towards a generalized skeleton, using a chlorine-induced semi-pinacol rearrangement and base-mediated oxindole formation as linchpin transforms.

=== Postdoctoral Studies ===
Reisman was an NIH Postdoctoral Fellow in the lab of Eric N. Jacobsen at Harvard University and worked with then-graduate student Abigail Doyle to develop an enantioselective substitution of silyl ketenes onto an alkoxy chloride via an oxocarbenium ion using a novel thiourea organocatalyst.

== Research ==
Reisman began her independent career as an assistant professor at Caltech in 2008 and was promoted to full professor in 2014.

The Reisman lab focuses on the synthesis of complex natural products and development of new chemical reactions, and the interplay between those two fields.

The group completed the first enantioselective total syntheses of (–)-acetylaranotin (40 years after its isolation), (–)-maoecrystal Z, (–)-8-demethoxyrunanine, and (–)-cepharatines A, C and D. Their total synthesis of (+)-ryanodol was completed in 15 synthetic steps, a significant improvement on the previous shortest synthetic route of 35 steps developed by Masayuki Inoue of the University of Tokyo. In 2019, Reisman and coworkers published the first total synthesis of isoryanoid diterpene (+)-perseanol in Nature. Other completed total syntheses include natural products (+)-naseseazines A and B, (+)-salvileucalin B, (+)-psiguadial B and (+)-pleuromutilin.

The group's reaction methodology work has focused primarily on nickel catalysis, cycloadditions, and the use of SmI2-mediated reductive cyclizations.

== Selected Awards and Honors ==
- 2022 - Inhoffen Medal
- 2020 - American Chemical Society Elias J. Corey Award
- 2019 – Margaret Faul Women in Chemistry Award
- 2018 – Lucy Pickett Lecture, Mount Holyoke College
- 2015–2017 – Heritage Medical Research Institute Investigator at the California Institute of Technology
- 2015 – Science News "Ten early-career scientists on their way to critical acclaim"
- 2014 - Tetrahedron Young Investigator Award for Organic Synthesis
- 2013 – Arthur C. Cope Scholar Award from the American Chemical Society in 2013
- 2012 – Inaugural American Chemical Society WCC's Rising Star Award winner”
- 2012 – Cottrell Scholar Award
- 2012 – Novartis Early Career Award
- 2012 – Amgen Young Investigator Award

Reisman was awarded the Boehringer Ingelheim New Faculty Grant, the Alfred P Sloan Foundation Fellowship and a 5-year NSF CAREER Award in 2011.
