= Corinna S. Schindler =

American organic chemist

- Education: Technical University of Munich Diploma 2004; ETH Zurich PhD 2010
- Scientific career
- Workplaces: University of British Columbia (2024-present); University of Michigan (2013–2024); Scripps Research
- Doctoral advisor: Erick M. Carreira
- Other academic advisors: K.C. Nicolaou, Eric N. Jacobsen
- Website: schindlerresearchgroup.com

Corinna S. Schindler is a professor of chemistry and Canada Research Chair Tier 1 at the University of British Columbia. She holds joint appointments in the Department of Chemistry and the Department of Biochemistry. Her lab develops diverse catalytic reactions towards the synthesis of biologically active small molecules. For her research in the development of new catalysts, Schindler has been honored with several early-career researcher awards including the David and Lucile Packard Foundation Fellowship in 2016, the Alfred P. Sloan Fellowship in 2017, and being named a member of the C&EN Talented 12 in 2017. In In 2026, she was recognized with the Arthur C. Cope Scholar Award from the American Chemical Society.

== Early life and education ==
Schindler was born and raised in Schwäbisch Hall, Germany. She did her undergraduate work at the Technical University of Munich, where she worked on organometallic chemistry. She completed her Diploma Thesis (equivalent of a Master of Science) in 2004 under the direction of K. C. Nicolaou at the Scripps Research Institute in La Jolla, California. In Nicolaou's group, Schindler worked on the total synthesis of the natural products marinomycins A-C.

Schindler earned her doctorate degree in 2010 at the ETH Zurich under the direction of Erick M. Carreira. Her PhD thesis focused on the development of new synthetic strategies to access the aeruginosin class of natural products, centered on the opening of oxabicyclic ring systems.

After completing her doctorate degree, Schindler joined Eric N. Jacobsen's research group at Harvard University as a Feodor Lynen Postdoctoral Fellow. In Jacobsen's group, she developed enantioselective aza-Sakurai reactions and photoredox catalysis for amine oxidations.

Schindler began her independent career in 2013 at the University of Michigan as an assistant professor. She was promoted to associate professor (and granted tenure) in 2019.

Schindler and her lab moved to the University of British Columbia in 2024, where she holds a prestigious Canada Research Chair Tier One position. Her group also operates a laboratory at the BC Cancer research institute.

== Research interests ==
Schindler's research group includes an international team of researchers working in the area of organic chemistry with an emphasis on the synthesis of molecules of biological importance. Key areas of interest include the development of new synthetic routes for molecules that are potentially important in the areas of material science and medicine. The group often develops methods driven by visible light, which enables access to the reactive excited states of substrates. Schindler's research group also focuses on the synthesis of biologically active natural products such as the platelet aggregation and influenza virus replication inhibiting herqulines B and C.

The Schindler laboratory has had a continued interest in the synthesis of four-membered strained heterocycles, namely azetidines, azetines, and oxetanes. Numerous publications have harnessed visible-light energy transfer catalysis to make these structures.

Her laboratory reported a carbonyl-olefin ring closure metathesis reaction using an environmentally benign iron catalyst, iron(III) chloride, that could replace widely-used precious metal catalysts, which are expensive and can be harmful to the environment.

== Awards and honors ==
For her contributions to science, Schindler has been the recipient of many research and recognition awards. These include:

- Feodor-Lynen Fellowship Alexander von Humboldt Foundation (2010)
- ETH Medal (2011)
- NSF Career Award (2016)
- Camille Dreyfus Teacher-Scholar Award (2018)
- C&E News Talented Twelve (2017)
- Alfred P. Sloan Foundation Fellow (2017)
- ACS Award in Pure Chemistry (2020)
- Arthur C. Cope Scholar Award (2026)
- Canada Research Chair Tier One (2024)

== Publications ==
- Schindler, Corinna S.; Forster, Patrik M.; Carreira, Erick M. (13 August 2010). "Facile Formation of N-Acyl-oxazolidinone Derivatives Using Acid Fluorides". Organic Letters. 12 (18). American Chemical Society (ACS): 4102–4105. doi:10.1021/ol1016977. ISSN 1523-7060. PMID 20707372.
- Schindler, Corinna S.; Diethelm, Stefan; Carreira, Erick M. (15 July 2009). "Nucleophilic Opening of Oxabicyclic Ring Systems". Angewandte Chemie International Edition. 48 (34). Wiley: 6296–6299. doi:10.1002/anie.200902046. ISSN 1433-7851. PMID 19606434.
- Schindler, Corinna S.; Carreira, Erick M. (2009). "Rapid formation of complexity in the total synthesis of natural products enabled by oxabicyclo[2.2.1]heptene building blocks". Chemical Society Reviews. 38 (11). Royal Society of Chemistry (RSC): 3222–3241. doi:10.1039/b915448p. ISSN 0306-0012. PMID 19847353.
- Schindler, Corinna S.; Stephenson, Corey R. J.; Carreira, Erick M. (3 November 2008). "Enantioselective Synthesis of the Core of Banyaside, Suomilide, and Spumigin HKVV". Angewandte Chemie International Edition. 47 (46). Wiley: 8852–8855. doi:10.1002/anie.200803655. ISSN 1433-7851. PMID 18855958.
- Schindler, Corinna S.; Jacobsen, Eric N. (31 May 2013). "A New Twist on Cooperative Catalysis". Science. 340 (6136). American Association for the Advancement of Science (AAAS): 1052–1053. Bibcode:2013Sci...340.1052S. doi:10.1126/science.1238769. ISSN 0036-8075. PMID 23723222. S2CID 35756570.
- Schindler, Corinna S.; Bertschi, Louis; Carreira, Erick M. (22 October 2010). "Total Synthesis of Nominal Banyaside B: Structural Revision of the Glycosylation Site". Angewandte Chemie International Edition. 49 (48). Wiley: 9229–9232. doi:10.1002/anie.201004047. ISSN 1433-7851. PMID 20967913.
