= Larry E. Overman =

Distinguished Professor of Chemistry at the University of California

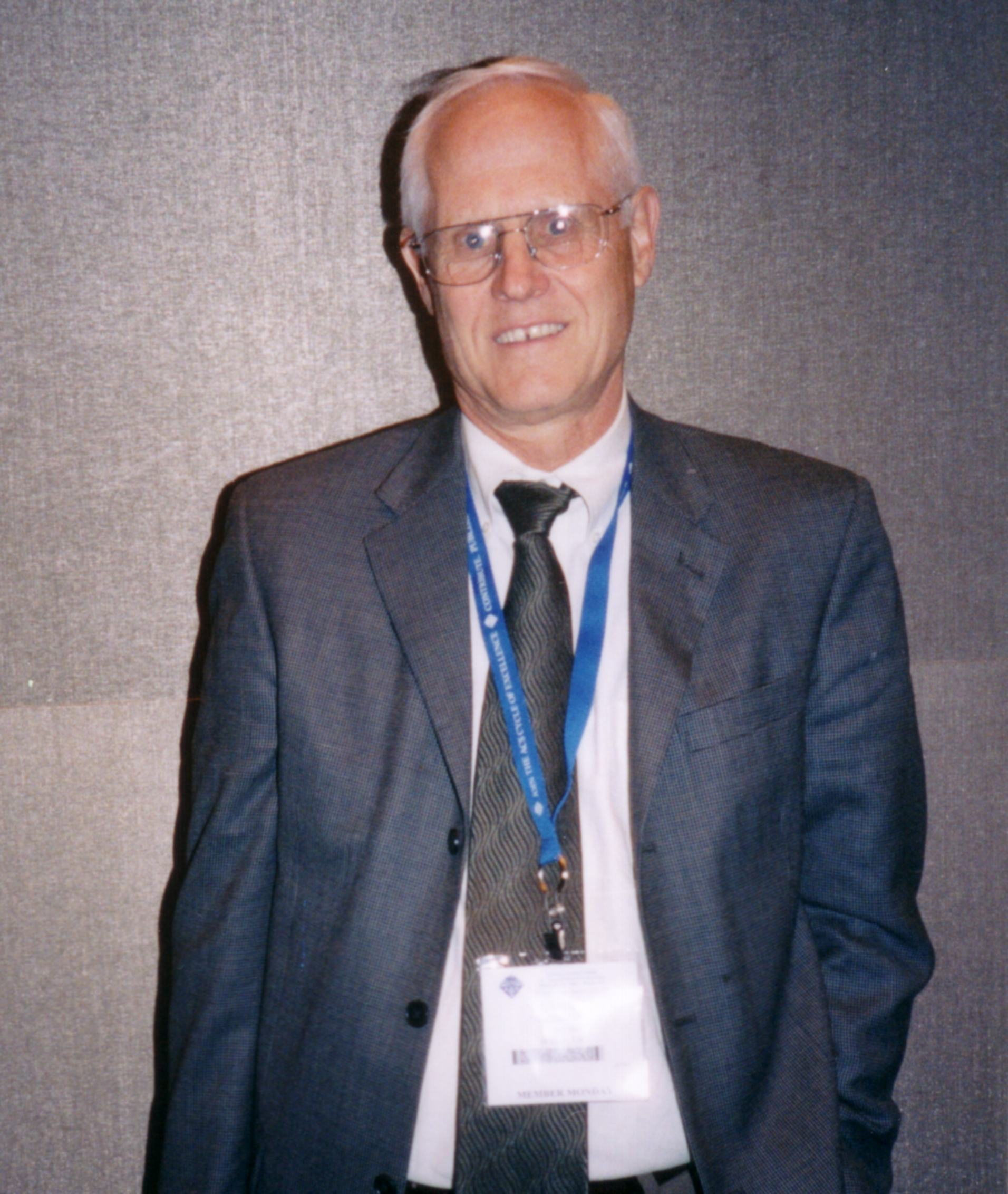
- Larry Overman at the 2006 ACS meeting in Atlanta
- Born: 1943 (age 82–83)
- Education: Earlham College; University of Wisconsin–Madison
- Scientific career
- Institutions: University of California, Irvine
- Doctoral students: David MacMillan
- Website: Official website

Larry E. Overman is a Distinguished Professor of Chemistry at the University of California, Irvine. He was born in Chicago in 1943. Overman obtained a B.A. degree from Earlham College in 1965, and he completed his Ph.D. in chemistry from the University of Wisconsin–Madison in 1969, under Howard Whitlock Jr. Professor Overman is a member of the United States National Academy of Sciences and the American Academy of Arts and Sciences. He was the recipient of the Arthur C. Cope Award in 2003, and he was awarded the Tetrahedron Prize for Creativity in Organic Chemistry for 2008.

Overman's research is focused on the development of new chemical reactions, particularly transition metal catalyzed reactions, and the application of those reactions toward the synthesis of natural products. Overman is most known for the Overman rearrangement, a Claisen rearrangement of allylic alcohols to give allylic trichloroacetamides.

== Career ==
Overman's Ph.D. focused on the mechanism of rearrangements related to the biosynthesis of lanosterol from squalene oxide via lanosterol synthase. Overman has explained that this work gave him a lifelong love of rearrangement reactions. This was followed by two years as a postdoctoral fellow at Columbia University with Ronald Breslow, using non-covalent binding of cyclodextrin as a model of enzyme binding.

Larry Overman began his career at University of California, Irvine in June 1971. The Irvine graduate program was small and thus in his early work Overman frequently performed experiments himself, including his initial discovery of the Overman rearrangement. Palladium emerged as the metal of choice for this reaction, and this led to a long-term interest in palladium catalysis, including the palladium(II)-catalyzed Cope rearrangement, and later work on intramolecular cascading Heck reactions.

Overman has performed many total syntheses of natural products, beginning with (±)-pumiliotoxin C (with Peter Jessup) in the late seventies. This interest was spurred on by a 1977 sabbatical visit by Samuel J. Danishefsky.

Overman has also worked extensively on the aza-Cope-Mannich reaction, originally designed to solve a stereoelectronic problem in the total synthesis of gephyrotoxin.

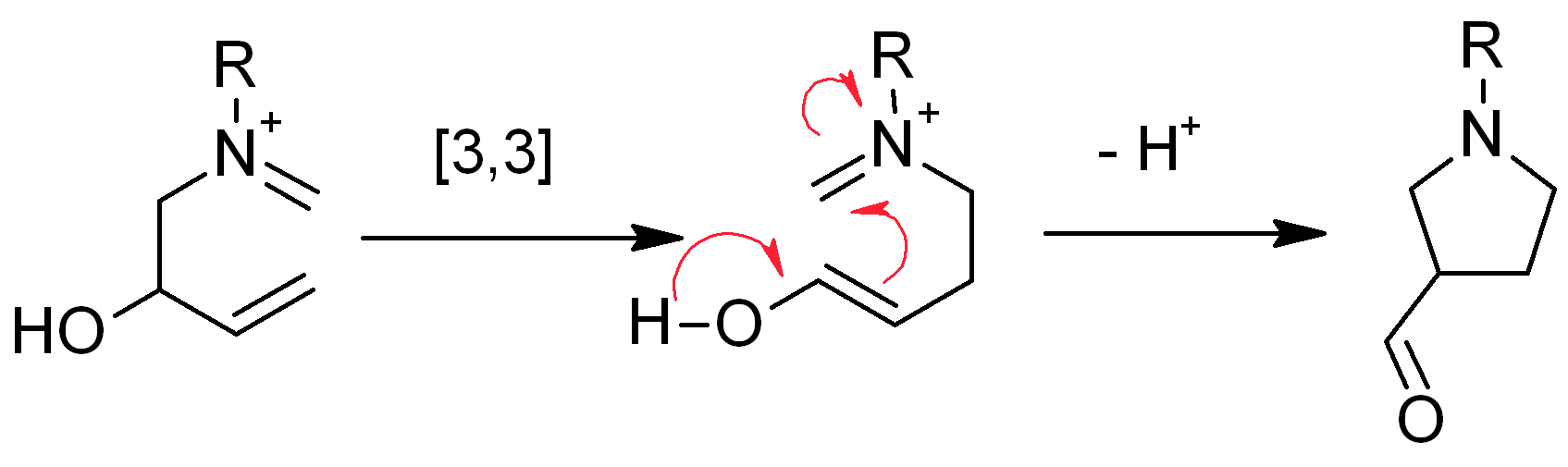
an Aza-Cope Mannich cascade reaction

This reaction is described by Overman as "robust", and was subsequently used in the total syntheses of several natural products, for example (–)-strychnine. A ring-enlarging version of the reaction was used in the synthesis of secondary metabolites such as actinophyllic acid. A related reaction, a Prins-Pinacol cascade which produces a tetrahydrofuran, has also been used extensively by the Overman group, for example in the total synthesis of (–)-magellanine, a Lycopodium alkaloid.

== Awards ==
- Myron L. Bender and Muriel S. Bender Summer Lectureship, Northwestern University (1994)
- Arthur C. Cope Award, 2003
- Tetrahedron Prize for Creativity in Organic Chemistry, 2008
- The Ryoji Noyori Prize, 2015

== General references ==
- University of California, Irvine faculty page
