= Yimon Aye =

American biochemist and molecular biologist

Associate professor Yimon Aye
- ရည်မွန်အေး
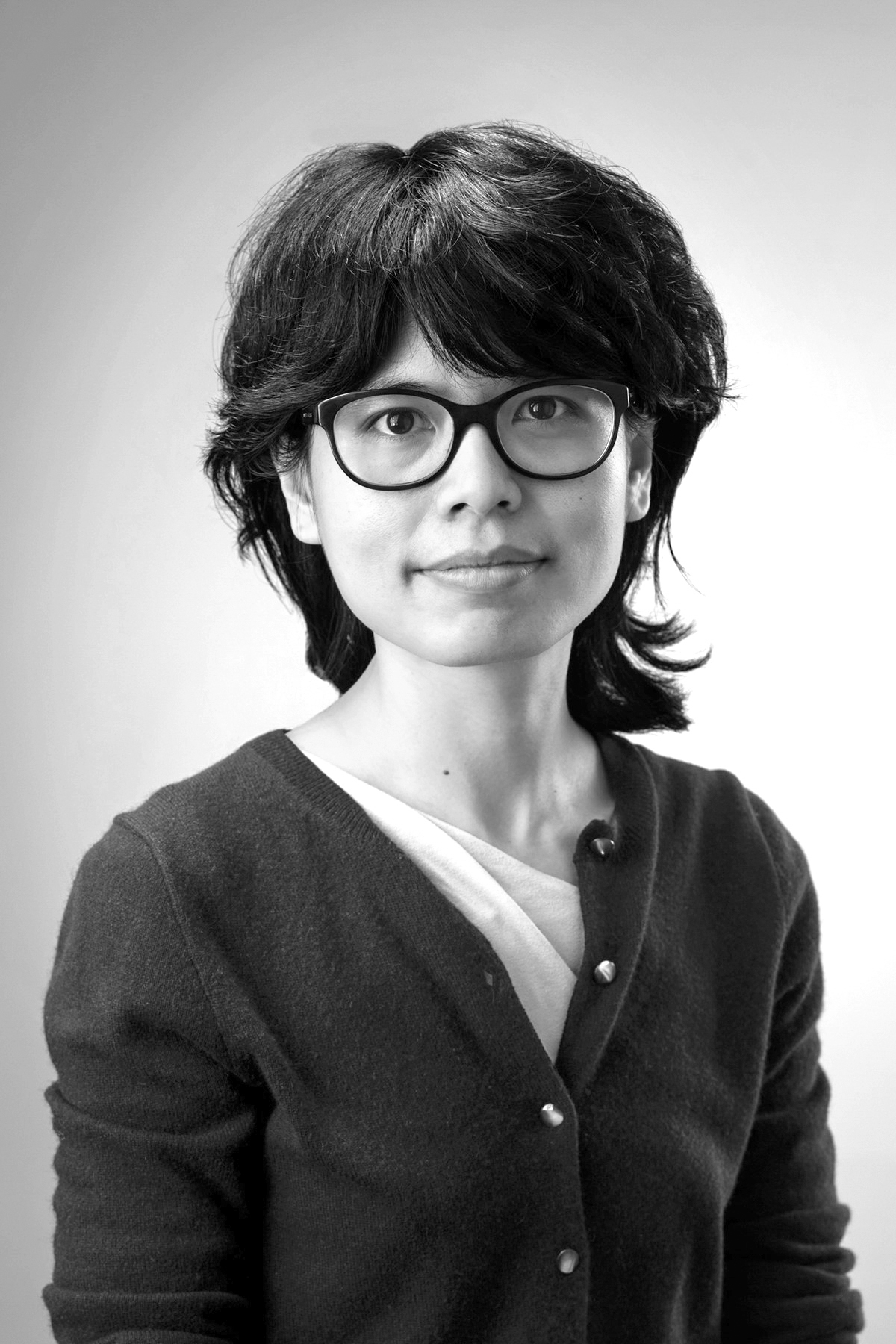
- Yimon Aye in 2018
- Born: 12 July 1980 (age 46)
- Citizenship: US-American
- Known for: Electrophile signaling Nucleotide signaling pathways
- Relatives: Soe Thein (father)

Academic background
- Education: Chemistry
- Alma mater: University of Oxford; Harvard University; Massachusetts Institute of Technology
- Doctoral advisor: David A. Evans
- Other advisor: JoAnne Stubbe

Academic work
- Discipline: Biology
- Sub-discipline: Molecular Biology
- Institutions: University of Oxford
- Main interests: Synthetic Methodology; Chemical Biology; Biochemistry; Biophysics; Molecular Biology; Cell Biology
- Website: www.chem.ox.ac.uk/people/yimon-aye

Yimon Aye (Burmese: ရည်မွန်အေး; born 12 July 1980 in Burma) is an American chemist and molecular biologist. Currently she is a professor of chemistry & chemical biology at University of Oxford.

== Career ==
Aye spent her early life in Burma. She completed her undergraduate studies in chemistry at the University of Oxford's Somerville College and obtained her master's degree in 2004. She joined Harvard University to study synthetic organic chemistry with David A. Evans, achieving her PhD in 2009. She then moved to Massachusetts Institute of Technology as a Damon Runyon Cancer Research Foundation fellow to work with JoAnne Stubbe. There she performed research into the regulatory mechanisms of ribonucleotide reductase.

In 2012, she started as an assistant professor at Cornell University, where she began her work on redox-dependent cell signaling and genome maintenance pathways. During this time, she developed REX technologies, new methods to facilitate the study of unconventional electrophile-regulated stress signaling paradigms. REX technologies were one of the first approaches to forge direct links between upstream protein alteration by a reactive molecule and downstream responses. From August 2018 to August 2024 she was an associate professor of chemistry at EPFL.

Since September 2024 she's leading the Aye Lab at University of Oxford. She is also a Professor of Chemistry and Chemical Biology. In February 2026, the Aye Lab published a study, that demonstrates how generating small stressor metabolite can help a cell's ability to convert RNA messenger into proteins.

== Awards ==
Aye was awarded the NSF CAREER award and Beckman Young Investigator award in 2014, the 2020 Eli Lilly Award in Biological Chemistry, the 2022 Tetrahedron Young Investigator Award, the Klaus Grohe Prize 2024, and ERC Advanced Grant 2025.

== Personal life ==
Yimon Aye's father Soe Thein is a former Commander-in-Chief of the Myanmar Navy. She has a brother and a sister.
