= David A. Evans =

American organic chemist (1941–2022)

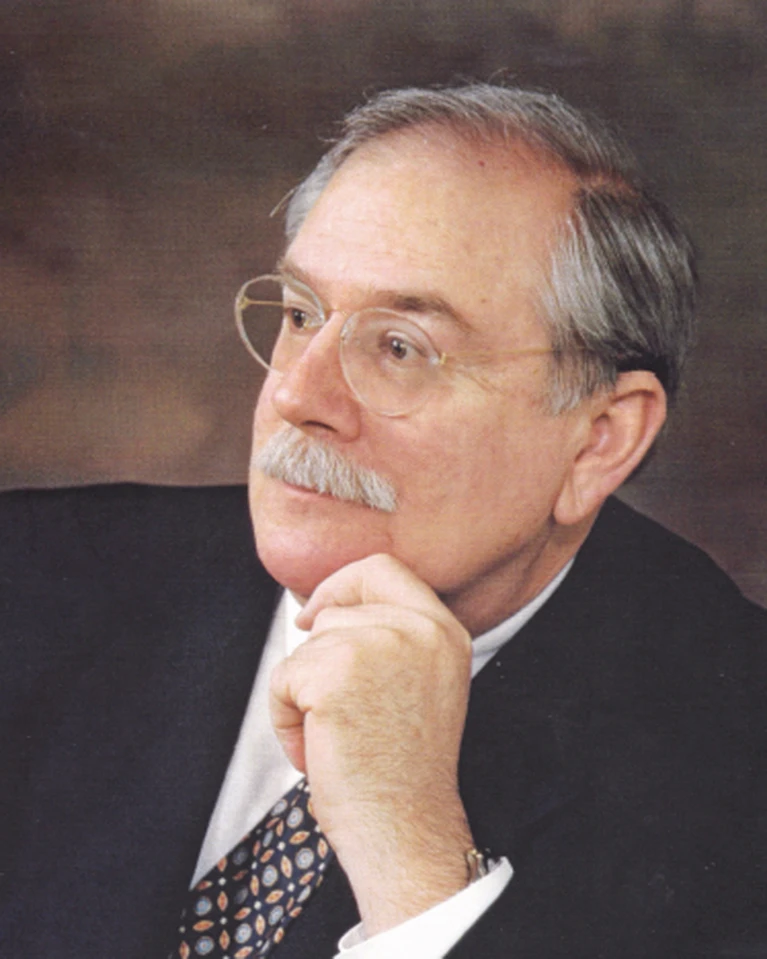
- Born: David Albert Evans; January 11, 1941; Washington, D.C., U.S.
- Died: April 29, 2022 (aged 81)
- Education: Oberlin College (BS); University of Michigan; California Institute of Technology (PhD)
- Spouse: Sally
- Scientific career
- Fields: Organic chemistry
- Workplaces: University of California, Los Angeles; California Institute of Technology; Harvard University
- Thesis: A Stereoselective Approach Toward the Synthesis of Some Pentacyclic Triterpenes (1968)
- Doctoral advisor: Robert E. Ireland
- Other academic advisors: Norman Craig
- Doctoral students: Yimon Aye, Erick M. Carreira, Gregory Fu, Margaret Faul, James L. Leighton, Scott J. Miller
- Other notable students: Undergrad: Tehshik Yoon; Post-docs: Amir H. Hoveyda, Frank Glorius, Marisa Kozlowski, Mark Lautens, Thomas Lectka, David MacMillan
- Website: Last snapshot of the Evans Group Website at the Wayback Machine (archived 2020-05-11)

David A. Evans (January 11, 1941 – April 29, 2022) was an American chemist who was the Abbott and James Lawrence professor of chemistry at Harvard University. He was a prominent figure in the field of organic chemistry and his research focused on synthetic chemistry and total synthesis, particularly of large biologically active molecules. Among his best-known works is the development of aldol reaction methodology (for example, Evans' acyl oxazolidinone method).

== Early life and education ==
Evans was born on January 11, 1941, in Washington, D.C. He received his B.A. from Oberlin College in 1963, where he worked with Norman Craig. He began his graduate work at the University of Michigan with Robert E. Ireland, but moved with the Ireland group to the California Institute of Technology and received his Ph.D. from Caltech in 1967.

== Academic career ==
Evans began his independent research career at the University of California, Los Angeles, where he joined the faculty in 1967 and became a full professor in 1973. He then moved to the California Institute of Technology and remained there until 1983, when he moved again to Harvard University. He was appointed the Abbott and James Lawrence Professor of Chemistry in 1990, served as chair of the Department of Chemistry and Chemical Biology from 1995 to 1998, and retired from the faculty, assuming professor emeritus status, in 2008.

== Research ==
Evans made many scholarly contributions to the field of organic chemistry. Although he is best known for his work on the aldol reaction, he also developed methodology for anionic oxy-Cope rearrangements, metal catalyzed hydroborations, and catalytic, enantioselective reactions based on bis-oxazoline (box) ligands. The Evans–Saksena reduction and Evans–Tishchenko reaction take their names from him. He is also well known for preparing a set of unpublished though widely disseminated lecture notes for Chemistry 206, a graduate-level organic chemistry course at Harvard.

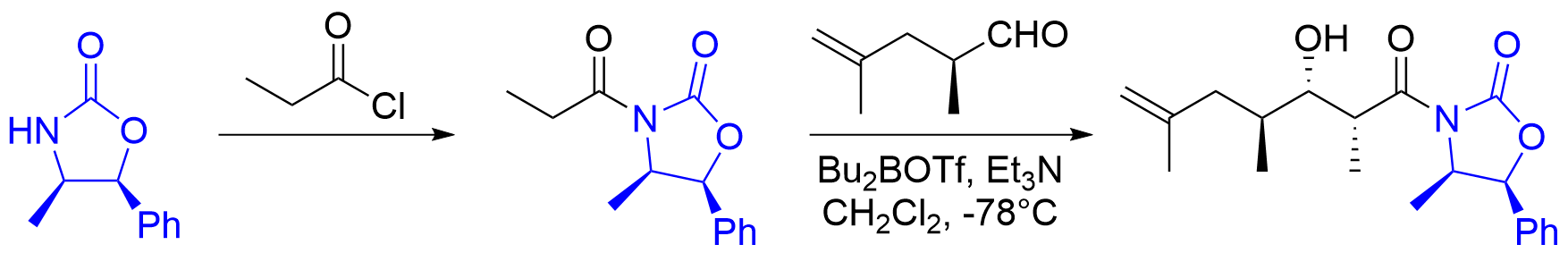

== Developing ChemDraw ==
The widely used chemical structure drawing software package ChemDraw was initially conceived by Evans and was developed by a graduate student, Stewart Rubenstein, with input from Evans, his wife Sally, and the Evans research group for the preparation of the group's manuscripts. ChemDraw was premiered in July 1985 at the Gordon Research Conference on Reactions & Processes in New Hampshire where Rubenstein and the Evanses demonstrated the new software during a break in the conference.

== Awards and honors ==
- Elected to the National Academy of Sciences, 1984
- Elected to the American Academy of Arts and Sciences, 1988
- Elected a Fellow of the American Association for the Advancement of Science, 1992
- Tetrahedron Prize for Creativity in Organic Chemistry & BioMedicinal Chemistry, 1998
- Arthur C. Cope Award, American Chemical Society, 2000
- The Ryoji Noyori Prize, Society of Synthetic Organic Chemistry, 2006
- Herbert C. Brown Award for Creative Research in Synthetic Methods, 2007
- Roger Adams Award in Organic Chemistry, American Chemical Society, 2013
