= Kendall Houk =

American chemist

Kendall Newcomb Houk
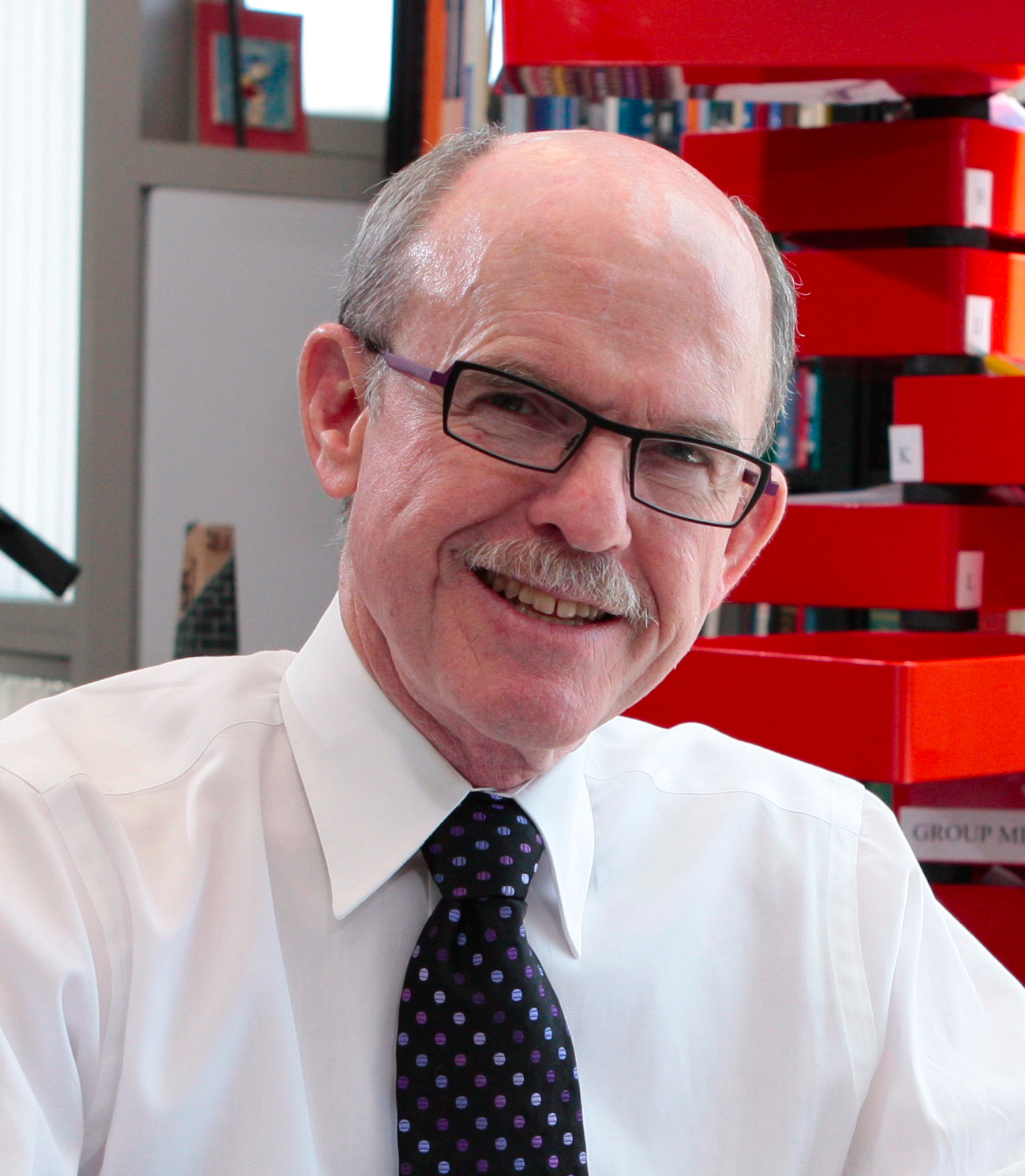
- Born: February 27, 1943 (age 83); Nashville, Tennessee, United States
- Education: Harvard University
- Known for: Theory of Chemical Reactivity and Selectivity
- Scientific career
- Fields: Chemistry
- Workplaces: Louisiana State University; University of Pittsburgh; University of California, Los Angeles
- Doctoral advisor: Robert Burns Woodward

Kendall Newcomb Houk is a Distinguished Research Professor in Organic Chemistry at the University of California, Los Angeles. His research group studies organic, organometallic, and biological reactions using the tools of computational chemistry. This work involves quantum mechanical calculations, often with density functional theory, and molecular dynamics, either quantum dynamics for small systems or force fields such as AMBER, for solution and protein simulations.

== Early life and education ==
K. N. Houk was born in Nashville, Tennessee, in 1943. He received his A.B. (1964), M.S. (1966), and Ph.D. (1968) degrees at Harvard, working with R. A. Olofson as an undergraduate and R. B. Woodward as a graduate student in the area of experimental tests of orbital symmetry selection rules. In 1968, he joined the faculty at Louisiana State University, becoming Professor in 1976.

In 1980, he moved to the University of Pittsburgh, and in 1986, he moved to UCLA. From 1988 to 1990, he was Director of the Chemistry Division of the National Science Foundation. He was Chairman of the UCLA Department of Chemistry and Biochemistry from 1991 to 1994.

== Awards and achievements ==
Houk received the Akron American Chemical Society (ACS) Section Award in 1984. He was awarded the Arthur C. Cope Scholar Award of the ACS in 1988, the James Flack Norris Award in Physical Organic Chemistry of the ACS in 1991, the Schrödinger Medal of the World Association of Theoretically Oriented Chemists (WATOC) in 1998, the Tolman Medal of the Southern California Section of the ACS in 1998, the ACS Award for Computers in Chemical and Pharmaceutical Sciences in 2003, the Arthur C. Cope Award of the ACS in 2010, the Robert Robinson Award of the Royal Society of Chemistry in 2012, and UCLA's Glenn T. Seaborg Award in 2013. He received the 2021 Roger Adams Award of the ACS, the highest award in organic chemistry by the ACS, and the 2021 Foresight Institute Feynman Prize for Theory in Nanotechnology. He and his collaborators won the Royal Society of Chemistry 2021 Horizon Prize for the discovery of pericyclases and a second Horizon Prize in 2024 for strained cumulenes. He won the Prix Franco-Americain from the French Chemical Society in 2024.

His achievements have been recognized by a variety of U.S. and international fellowships. He was a Camille and Henry Dreyfus Teacher Scholar, a Fellow of the Alfred P. Sloan Foundation, the von Humboldt Foundation U.S. Senior Scientist in 1981, an Erskine Fellow in New Zealand in 1993, the Lady Davis Fellow at the Technion in Haifa, Israel in 2000, and a JSPS Fellow in Japan in 2001. He was elected to the American Academy of Arts and Sciences in 2002 and the International Academy of Quantum Molecular Sciences in 2003. He is a Fellow of the AAAS, the ACS, the WATOC, and the Royal Society of Chemistry. He was the Saul Winstein Chair in Organic Chemistry at UCLA from 2009 to 2021 and is now a Distinguished Research Professor. He was elected a member of the National Academy of Sciences in 2010. He was also elected a foreign member of the Chinese Academy of Sciences (CAS) in 2021.

Houk received the L.S.U. Distinguished Research Master Award in 1968, was named the Faculty Research Lecturer at UCLA for 1998, received the Bruylants Chair from the University of Louvain-la-Neuve in Belgium in 1998, and was awarded an honorary doctorate (Dr. rer. nat. h. c.) from the University of Essen in Germany in 1999. He was an Honorary Professor at the University of Queensland, Brisbane, Australia.

He is a 2025 Clarivate Cited Researcher and has an h-index of 156 (Web of Science) or 176 (Google Scholar).

== Service ==
Houk has served on the Advisory Boards of the Chemistry Division of the National Science Foundation, the ACS Petroleum Research Fund, and a variety of journals, including Accounts of Chemical Research, the Journal of the American Chemical Society, the Journal of Organic Chemistry, Chemical and Engineering News, the Journal of Computational Chemistry, the Journal of Chemical Theory and Computation, Chemistry - A European Journal, Topics in Current Chemistry, the Chinese Journal of Chemistry, and the Israel Journal of Chemistry. From 2018 to 2021, he was the North American Co-chair of Chemistry – A European Journal.

He has been a member of the NIH Medicinal Chemistry Study Section and the NRC Board of Chemical Sciences and Technology. He was Chair of the Chemistry Section of the AAAS in 2000-2003 and served as Chair of the NIH Synthesis and Biological Chemistry-A Study Section in 2008.

He co-chaired the NIH-DOE-NSF Workshop on Building Strong Academic Chemistry Departments Through Gender Equity in 2006. He was a Senior Editor of Accounts of Chemical Research from 2005 to 2015.

He was Director of the UCLA Chemistry-Biology Interface Training Program, an NIH-supported training grant from 2002 to 2012 and is a member of the UCLA Molecular Biology Institute and the California NanoSystems Institute.
