= Tehshik Yoon =

Canadian-born chemist (born 1975)

Tehshik P. Yoon
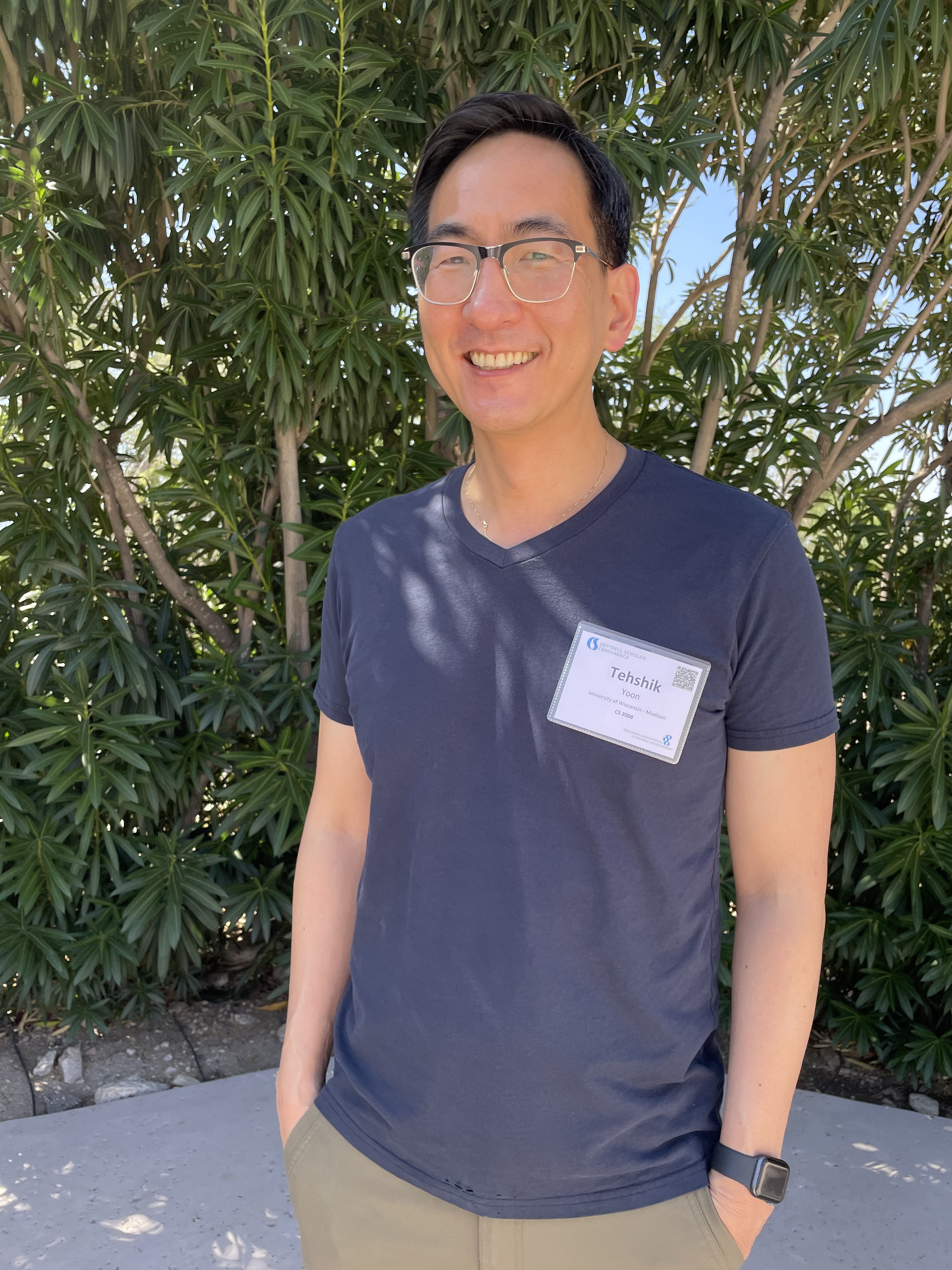
- Tehshik Yoon at the 2026 Cottrell Scholars Conference in Tucson
- Born: 20 June 1975 (age 51); Montreal, Canada
- Citizenship: United States
- Education: Harvard University; California Institute of Technology; University of California, Berkeley
- Scientific career
- Fields: Organic Chemistry
- Institutions: University of Wisconsin–Madison; Harvard University
- Thesis: The acyl-Claisen rearrangement: development of a novel metal-catalyzed Claisen rearrangement and enantioselective variants of the acyl-Claisen rearrangement (2002)
- Doctoral advisor: David MacMillan
- Other academic advisors: Eric Jacobsen; Erick M. Carreira; David A. Evans
- Website: https://yoon.chem.wisc.edu/

Tehshik Peter Yoon (born 20 June 1975) is a Canadian-born chemist who studies new reaction methods for organic synthesis with the use of catalysis. Yoon currently is a professor at the University of Wisconsin–Madison in the chemistry department. For his contributions to science, he has received numerous awards including the Beckman Young Investigator Award and National Science Foundation CAREER Award.

== Background ==
Yoon was born in Montreal, Quebec and grew up in Blacksburg, VA. As an undergraduate at Harvard University, he became fascinated by organic chemistry working in the laboratories of leading experts in contemporary asymmetric synthesis. Specifically, Yoon first experienced research in David A. Evans's lab studying stereocontrolled aldol reactions. After earning his A.B. in chemistry from Harvard in 1996, he proceeded to earn his M.S. under the guidance of Erick M. Carreira, who introduced Yoon to synthesis of complex natural products through applied photochemistry. Yoon was then accepted as Dave MacMillan's first graduate student, initially at UC Berkeley and later at Caltech, where he earned his Ph.D. investigating methods to control the stereochemistry of pericyclic reactions. He returned to Harvard in 2002 as a postdoc to research the use of hydrogen bonding urea catalysts in asymmetric synthesis in the laboratory of Eric Jacobsen.

== Independent career ==
Yoon has started his independent career in 2005 in the chemistry department at the University of Wisconsin-Madison where he has been ever since. His group specializes in studying the atomic level of control and molecular shape that can be manipulated by chemical synthesis. He has a research group that studies high energy and reactive molecules which convert into more stable molecules through chemical reactions. Such molecules include radicals and electronically organic triplets to more complex structures.

== Research ==
Yoon's research lab at the University of Wisconsin-Madison focuses on developing new reaction methods for organic synthesis, especially those involving transition metal photochemistry, stereocontrolling, and dual catalysis.

Overview

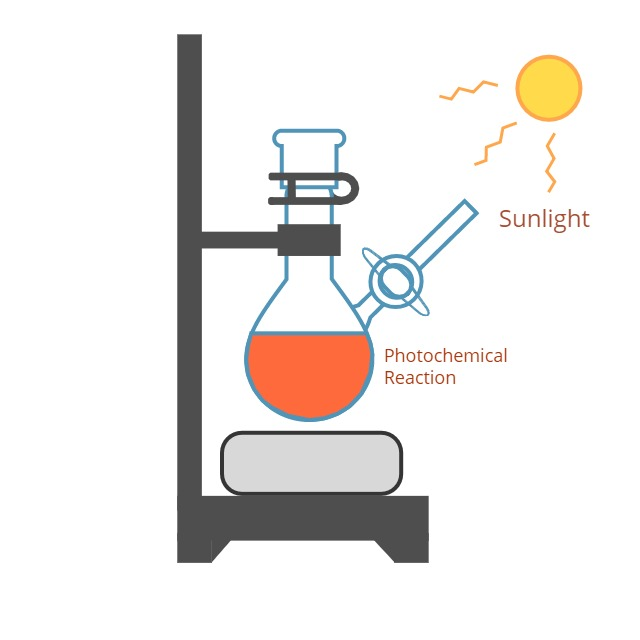
Diagram of setup using visible light (in this case, sunlight) to activate a photochemical reaction. The image includes a Schlenk flask, clamp stand, and other lab equipment.

In particular, Yoon's group aims to leverage the ability of visible light–absorbing transition metal complexes to catalyze synthetic reactions. They investigate various mechanisms of photocatalytic activation, which differ from complex to complex depending on reactivity patterns of intermediates and their ability to be activated by sources of white light, including sunlight. Traditionally, chemists have used high-energy UV light to activate simple organic molecules, but Yoon's group focuses instead on expanding the application of visible light sources to synthesize increasingly complex target molecules. By providing strategies for activation of organic substrates that do not require specialized high-pressure UV photolysis apparatuses, these procedures are rendered more environmentally-friendly and widely available to synthetic and organic chemists.

Significant Developments

One notable process explored by Yoon's research is the generation of photoreductants by irradiation of [Ru(bpy)_{3}]^{2+} that can initiate desired cycloaddition. The group proved [Ru(bpy)_{3}]Cl_{2} to be an efficient photocatalyst for the formal [2+2] cycloaddition of enones and yields potential for development of new reaction protocols with reduced environmental impact. Yoon's group has also researched into crossed intermolecular [2+2] heterodimerizations, proving the possibility of using two dissimilar enone substrates to successfully produce these dimers. This method bypasses some synthetic limitations of cycloadditions conducted under standard UV photolysis conditions.

Yoon reviews the ways how cocatalyst strategies can be applied to synthesis, ranging from developments in organic photochemistry and the precedents that brought interest in photocatalytic synthesis. The interaction between an excited photocatalyst and organic molecule can show a diverse sample of reactive intermediates that can be manipulated to form a synthetic bond construction. This impacts the photocatalyst and the photoactivation steps such as the interaction with the excited state of the photocatalyst or controlling the rate and selectivity of the photoactivation steps.

Additionally, Yoon takes a dual approach to the asymmetric of enantioselective [2+2] photocycloadditions by using visible light that can absorb transition metal and a Lewis acid cocatalyst. Yoon was able to see that each catalyst can be enabled to be independent resulting in a broader scope and greater flexibility and efficiency in enantioselective photochemical cycloadditions. Along with the metal photocatalyst being compatible with several types of Lewis acid catalyst. Yoon developed the first highly enantioselective intermolecular reaction of α-amino radicals by using the dual-catalyst protocol to combine the transition metal photoredox catalysis with the chiral Lewis acid catalysis. The combination of these catalysts provided an approach to control the stereochemistry of a wide variety of photoinitiated organic reactions.

Furthermore, Yoon was able to perform quantum yield measurements to showcase that three distinct photoredox processes and involvement in the formation of chain reactions. In the combination of doing quantum yield and luminescence quenching experiments, it displays a method to estimate the length of these chains, to determine a lower limit for these chains and to diagnose inefficient initiation steps in photoredox reactions. Yoon demonstrated that the chain processes dominated the product formation of the three photoredox transformations.

== Awards and honors ==
- 2026 Samsung Ho-Am Prize for Chemistry and Life Sciences
- 2015 Friedrich Wilhelm Bessel Award, granted by the Alexander Von Humboldt Foundation
- 2013 William H. Kiekhofer Distinguished Teaching Award, presented by University of Wisconsin-Madison
- 2010 Eli Lilly Grantee Award, conferred by Eli Lilly & Company
- 2010 Camille Dreyfus Teacher-Scholar Award, granted by the Camille & Henry Dreyfus Foundation
- 2009 Amgen Young Investigator Award, sponsored by Amgen
- 2009 Alfred P. Sloan Research Fellowship, awarded by the Alfred P. Sloan Foundation
- 2008 Cottrell Scholar Award, presented by Research Corporation for Scientific Advancement (RCSA)
- 2008 Beckman Young Investigator Award, granted by the Arnold and Mabel Beckman Foundation
- 2007 NSF CAREER Award, initiated through the National Science Foundation CAREER Awards

== Personal life ==
Yoon is openly gay and has been a vocal advocate for greater inclusion of and support for diverse members of the STEM community throughout his career. Yoon is a long time member of the UW-Madison Committee on LGBT Issues, which he chaired between 2013 and 2014. He has also given numerous invited lectures on topics relating to being LGBTQIA+ in STEM. Yoon lives in Madison, Wisconsin with his husband, Michael Velliquette, who is an artist.
