= Scott E. Denmark =

American chemist

Scott Eric Denmark
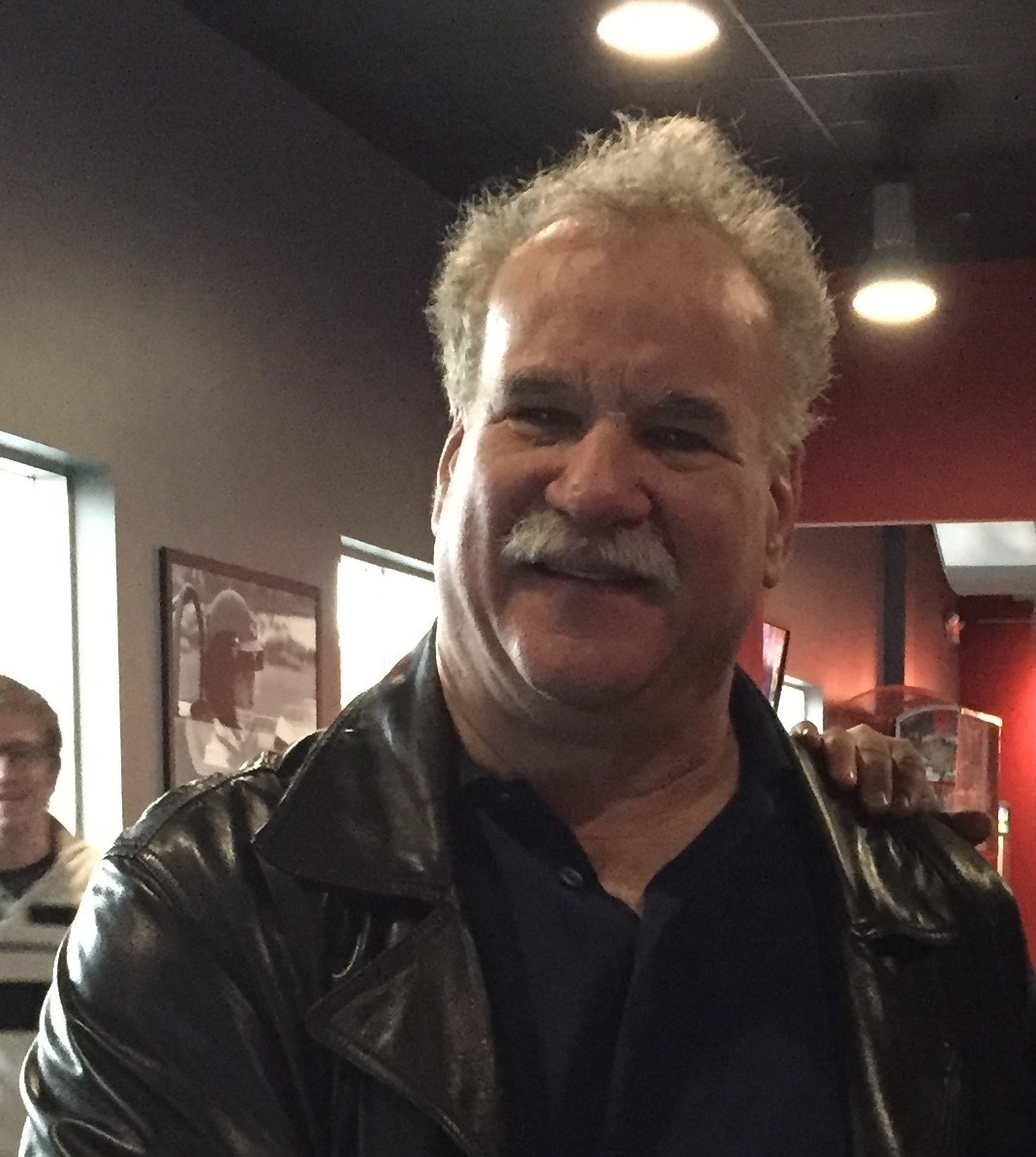
- Denmark in 2016
- Born: 17 June 1953 (age 73); Lynbrook, New York
- Education: MIT (Undergraduate); ETH Zürich (Graduate)
- Known for: Organocatalysis, Enantioselective synthesis, Suzuki reaction, Organometallic chemistry, Organic Reactions
- Awards: Arthur C. Cope Scholar Award, RSC Pedler Medal, Member of American Academy of Arts and Sciences, Member of National Academy of Sciences
- Scientific career
- Fields: Chemistry
- Workplaces: University of Illinois at Urbana–Champaign
- Doctoral advisor: Albert Eschenmoser
- Notable students: Erick M. Carreira
- Website: http://denmark.scs.illinois.edu/

Scott Eric Denmark is an American chemist who is the Reynold C. Fuson Professor of Chemistry at the University of Illinois at Urbana-Champaign (UIUC). Denmark received an S.B. degree from MIT in 1975 and the D.Sc.Tech. degree from ETH Zurich in 1980, under the supervision of Professor Albert Eschenmoser. He joined the faculty at UIUC the same year and became an associate professor in 1986, full professor in 1987, and was named the Fuson Professor of Chemistry in 1991. He served as the president and editor-in-chief of the Organic Reactions book series between 2008 and 2018. In 2017, Denmark was elected to the American Academy of Arts and Sciences. In 2018, he was elected to the National Academy of Sciences.

== Early life and education ==
Denmark was born in Lynbrook, New York in 1953. He attended MIT as an undergraduate and during his studies he was involved in research with both Richard H. Holm on ferredoxin analogs and Daniel S. Kemp on functionalized cyclophanes. He received his S.B. degree from MIT in 1975. His graduate studies were conducted at the ETH Zürich under the supervision of Albert Eschenmoser. Denmark received the D.Tech. Sc. degree in 1980 for his thesis On the Stereochemistry of the S N’ Reaction. Denmark was the third Eschenmoser lecturer at the ETH Zürich in 2018, the first former Eschenmoser graduate student thus honored.

== Research ==
Denmark began his independent academic research career in 1980 at the University of Illinois at Urbana-Champaign, where his laboratory's early work focused on investigation of the Nazarov cyclization reaction and Claisen rearrangement. This work was later recognized by the Frederick Stanley Kipping Award to Denmark in 2014.

Other interests in Denmark's group include nitroalkene related cycloaddition reactions, phosphorus-stabilized anions, aldol chemistry, asymmetric allylmetal chemistry, silicon-based cross-coupling reactions, phase-transfer catalysis, water-gas shift reaction, and organocatalysis. His work on the palladium-catalyzed cross-coupling reaction with vinylsilanol and arylsilanol has been recognized as the Hiyama-Denmark coupling.

Significant interests of Denmark's also include asymmetric catalysis with main group elements, also known as Lewis base catalysis, which is a subclass of organocatalysis. He developed the paradigm of Lewis base activation of Lewis acids and successfully applied it to the asymmetric addition of a broad range of nucleophiles to silyl ketene acetals, iodo- and bromo-functionalization of alkenes, and enantioselective thio- and seleno-functionalization of alkenes. His work has yielded several Lewis base catalysts that are chiral phosphoramide derivatives. Unlike other organocatalysts, the Lewis base catalysts operate without the assistance of H-bonding, and have a broad substrate scope.

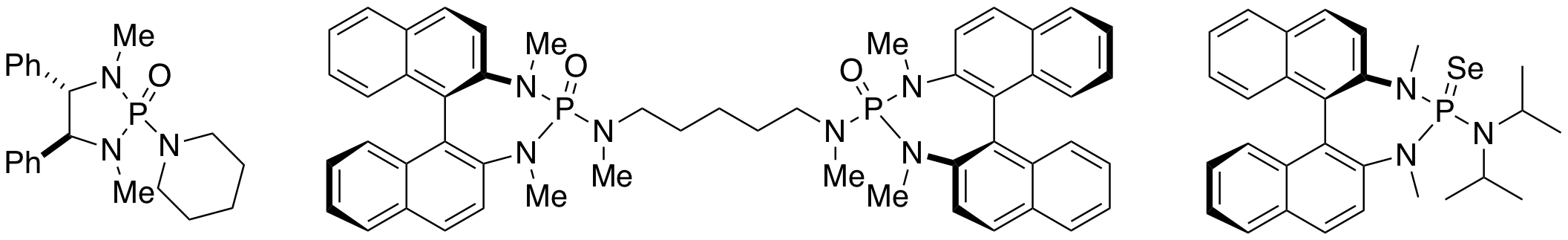
Select chiral Lewis base catalysts developed by Scott Denmark for asymmetric catalysis

An additional area of research for the Denmark group is the observation and characterization of the pre-transmetalation species of the boron-palladium adduct in Suzuki reactions using rapid-injection NMR techniques. Denmark also has research interests in computational chemistry and chemoinformatics, organic chemistry, and catalysis with nanoparticles.

Denmark has published over 400 peer-reviewed articles and 27 book chapters and edited several book volumes including: Topics in Stereochemistry, Organic Syntheses, and Lewis Base Catalysis in Organic Synthesis. He has been an editor of Organic Reactions since 1994 and the editor-in-chief and president from 2008 to 2019. Denmark is known for his intensity and enthusiasm as an advisor and for his strict adherence to the 'Swiss method' of organic synthesis, compound characterization, and reporting of experimental methods. Students who worked with him early in his research career later recalled their self-description as "Denmark's Disciples" in a retrospective recognizing his contributions.

== Awards and honors ==
- Elected fellow of the American Chemical Society, 2009
- Elected to the American Academy of Arts and Sciences, 2017
- Elected to the United States National Academy of Sciences, 2018
- Recipient of the Arthur C.Cope Award, 2023
