= Scott Miller (chemist) =

American chemist (born 1966)

Scott Joseph Miller (born December 11, 1966) is an American organic chemist serving as Sterling Professor of Chemistry at Yale University and as the editor-in-chief of the Journal of Organic Chemistry. He has been elected to the American Association for the Advancement of Science, the American Academy of Arts and Sciences, and the National Academy of Sciences, and is known for his research into stereochemistry, asymmetric catalysis, enzymes, modification of natural products, and the synthesis and function of complex molecules.

Miller was born on December 11, 1966, in Buffalo, New York. From 1985 to 1989, he studied at Harvard University, receiving Bachelor of Arts and Master of Arts degrees in chemistry. He continued his studies at Harvard, and received a Doctor of Philosophy in chemistry in 1994, advised by David A. Evans. He was a National Science Foundation postdoctoral fellow in the laboratory of Robert H. Grubbs at the California Institute of Technology from 1994 to 1996. Miller became an assistant professor of chemistry at Boston College in 1996, and received the National Science Foundation CAREER Award in 1999. In 2000, he was awarded a Camille Dreyfus Teacher-Scholar Award and a Sloan Research Fellowship; he became an associate professor the next year. From 2002 until 2006, he was employed as a professor at Boston College; during his tenure, he won the Arthur C. Cope Scholar Award in 2004.

In 2006, Miller was appointed a professor of chemistry at Yale University, and he was named Irénée du Pont Professor of Chemistry in 2008. He was elected a fellow of the American Association for the Advancement of Science in 2011. Miller became the editor-in-chief of ACS Publications' Journal of Organic Chemistry in 2016, the same year he became a member of the American Academy of Arts and Sciences in recognition of his research into enzyme-mimicking peptidic catalysts. In 2020, he was additionally elected to the National Academy of Sciences for his contributions to researching catalysts of molecular synthesis. He became Sterling Professor of Chemistry in 2023, Yale's "highest academic honor" for a professor. In 2026, he was awarded the Gabor A. Somorjai Award for Creative Research in Catalysis by the American Chemical Society.
