= Alison Wendlandt =

American chemist

Alison E. Wendlandt
- Born: Colorado
- Education: University of Chicago; Yale University; University of Wisconsin
- Scientific career
- Workplaces: Harvard University; Massachusetts Institute of Technology
- Thesis: Design and development of quinone catalysts for aerobic C-N bond dehydrogenation reactions (2015)

Alison Wendlandt is an American chemist who is an associate professor at the Massachusetts Institute of Technology. Her research considers the development of catalysts for organic synthesis.

== Early life and education ==
Wendlandt is from Colorado. She earned her bachelor's degree in chemistry at the University of Chicago. She acquired her master's degree at Yale University. Her graduate research initially considered chemical biology: how certain molecules interact human health. During her research she became more interested in reaction processes and what she could do to make them more efficient. She moved to Wisconsin for her doctoral studies, where she worked alongside Shannon Stahl on the development of catalysts that mediate amine oxidation. She then joined Harvard University as a postdoctoral fellow working alongside Eric Jacobsen.

== Research and career ==
In 2018, Wendlandt joined the department of chemistry at Massachusetts Institute of Technology. She works on the development of catalysts for organic chemistry. In particular, she develops dual catalysts for selective synthesis. Wendlandt used an enzyme from Streptomyces fradiae to drive the conversion of rare sugar isomers. This simple one-site reaction allowed for the conversion of D-Glucose to D-allose (a potential candidate for low-calorie sweeteners) with a 40% yield.

Wendlandt showed that a combination of polyanionic tungsten and disulfide could be used to drive enantioselective reactions. The dual catalyst approach allowed her to make a breakthrough in alkene isomerization, making it possible to precisely control the interconversion of alkene regioisomers.

== Awards and honors ==
- 2019 Cecil and Ida Green Career Development Professorship
- 2020 Thieme Medical Publishers Chemistry Journal Award
- 2021 Beckman Young Investigators Award
- 2021 National Institutes of Health New Innovator Award

== Selected publications ==
- Alison E. Wendlandt; Alison M. Suess; Shannon S. Stahl (27 October 2011). "Copper-catalyzed aerobic oxidative C-H functionalizations: trends and mechanistic insights". Angewandte Chemie International Edition. 50 (47): 11062–11087. doi:10.1002/anie.201103945. ISSN 1433-7851. PMID 22034061. Wikidata Q82240226.
- Alison E. Wendlandt; Shannon S. Stahl (1 December 2015). "Quinone-Catalyzed Selective Oxidation of Organic Molecules". Angewandte Chemie International Edition. 54 (49): 14638–58. doi:10.1002/anie.201505017. ISSN 1433-7851. PMC 4859943. PMID 26530485. Wikidata Q28085039.
- Alison E. Wendlandt; Shannon S. Stahl (18 December 2013). "Bioinspired aerobic oxidation of secondary amines and nitrogen heterocycles with a bifunctional quinone catalyst". Journal of the American Chemical Society. 136 (1): 506–512. doi:10.1021/ja411692v. ISSN 0002-7863. PMC 3985088. PMID 24328193. Wikidata Q37700363.

== Personal life ==
Wendlandt is queer, and was included as one of Chemical & Engineering News' Trailblazers in 2021. In an interview, Wendlandt described her experience of being LGBTQ+ in science: "I think being different, whatever that means — in my case, being LGBTQ — has been like a superpower."
