= Fu's Planar DMAP =

4-(Dimethylamino)pyridine (DMAP) is a nucleophilic catalyst frequently used for the acylation of alcohols and the rearrangement of O-acylated enolates. Due to the need for an enantioselective version of this catalyst, Gregory Fu π-complexed the heterocycle with a metal and added a 2-substituent to the ring. This resulted in a planar chiral set of enantioselective DMAP analogs.

As of 2018, at least two such catalysts were commercially available: DMAPC_{5}Ph_{5}, a 1,2,3,4,5-pentaphenylferrocene-fused DMAP derivative, and PPY*, a 1,2,3,4,5-pentamethylferrocene-fused 4-pyrrolidinylpyridine derivative. A drawback of these catalysts is their limited production volume, as the 1996 synthesis route produces a racemate, requiring resolution via chiral HPLC. In 2020, a high-yield enantioselective synthesis of the two commercial catalysts, amongst other ferrocene-fused 4-dialkylaminopyridines, was achieved.
