= James L. Leighton =

American chemist (born 1964)

James Lincoln Leighton (born February 12, 1964) is an American chemist. He is a professor of chemistry in the Department of Chemistry at Columbia University. He is known for his non-aldol approaches to polyketides.

== Education and career ==
Leighton was born in New Haven, Connecticut. As an undergraduate at Yale University (B.S. 1987), Leighton worked for synthetic chemist Samuel J. Danishefsky. After 2 years with Merck Research Laboratories, Leighton began his graduate studies with Abbott and James Lawrence Professor David A. Evans at Harvard University (Ph.D. 1994), culminating in the total syntheses of both Calyculin A and Zaragozic acid. Leighton continued his chemical studies as an NSF postdoctoral fellow with Sheldon Emery Professor Eric N. Jacobsen, also of Harvard University, developing initial methods for what became known as the Jacobsen hydrolytic kinetic resolution.

In 1996, Leighton began his independent career at Columbia, becoming a full professor in 2004. In recognition of his scholarly contributions in the laboratory and classroom, he was awarded the Arthur C. Cope Scholar award (2003) by the American Chemical Society, as well as the Mark Van Doren Award for Teaching, Columbia's most prestigious teaching award.

== Notable contributions ==
In addition to Leighton's novel methods for synthesizing natural products, including: CP-263,114, Leucascandrolide A, Mycoticin A, SCH 351448, Dolabelide D, Manzacidin C, Zincophorin, he has also pioneered the concept of strain-release silane Lewis acids. In particular, he has developed a silicon/pseudoephedrine allylation reagent for the highly enantioselective allylation of aldehydes and aldehyde/ketone derived hydrazones to give chiral alcohols and secondary/tertiary carbinamines, respectively.
