= Organic Reactions =

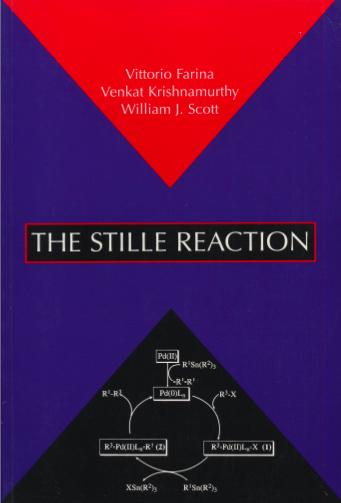
- Discipline: Organic chemistry
- Language: English
- Edited by: Andrew Evans

Publication details
- History: 1942–present
- Publisher: John Wiley & Sons

Standard abbreviations
- ISO 4: Org. React.

Indexing
- CODEN: ORREAW
- ISSN: 0078-6179
- LCCN: 42020265

Links
- Series homepage; Series page at publisher's website; Online archive

Organic Reactions is a peer-reviewed book series that was established in 1942. It publishes detailed descriptions of useful organic reactions. Each article (called a chapter) is an invited review of the primary source material for the given reaction, and is written under tight editorial control, making it a secondary to tertiary‑level source. Each chapter explores the practical and theoretical aspects of the reaction, including its selectivity and reproducibility. The longest chapter runs to 1,303 pages. While individual articles are not open access, the journal's wiki maintains a repository of summaries of reactions. The series is abstracted and indexed in Scopus.

== History ==
Prior to World War II, the center of organic chemistry research and industrial production was Germany. Students interested in pursuing a career in organic chemistry needed to learn German to read articles and textbooks, and often went to graduate school in Germany. When the war broke out, an effort to jump‑start a native US organic chemical industry and academic network was initiated. As part of this effort, the journal was launched. The first volume was published in 1942, with Roger Adams as editor-in-chief. In the early years a volume would come out every two years or so, but the pace of publishing has accelerated, with volume 100 issued in 2019.
