= Matthew Sigman =

American chemist

Matthew S. Sigman
- Education: University of Utah (B.S.) Washington State University (Ph.D.)
- Awards: Patai-Rappoport Lecture Award (2023) ACS Award for Creative Work in Synthetic Organic Chemistry (2017); Arthur C. Cope Scholar Award (2010); Pfizer Award for Creativity in Organic Chemistry (2004); Camille and Henry Dreyfus Teacher Scholar Award (2004) National Science Foundation CAREER Award (2002)
- Scientific career
- Fields: Organic Chemistry, Asymmetric Catalysis
- Workplaces: University of Utah
- Thesis: Catalytic iron mediated [4 + 1] cycloadditions of allenyl substrates with carbon monoxide. Mechanism and scope of catalytic cobalt mediated cyclotrimerization of alkynes in aqueous media. (1996)
- Doctoral advisor: Bruce E. Eaton
- Website: https://www.sigmanlab.com/

Matthew S. Sigman is an American chemist, focusing in Organic Synthesis & Asymmetric Catalysis. He is the Peter J. Christine S. Stang Presidential Endowed Chair and Distinguished Honors Professor at University of Utah and a Fellow of the American Association for the Advancement of Science.
