= David MacMillan =

Scottish organic chemist (born 1968)

Professor Sir David MacMillan FRS FRSE
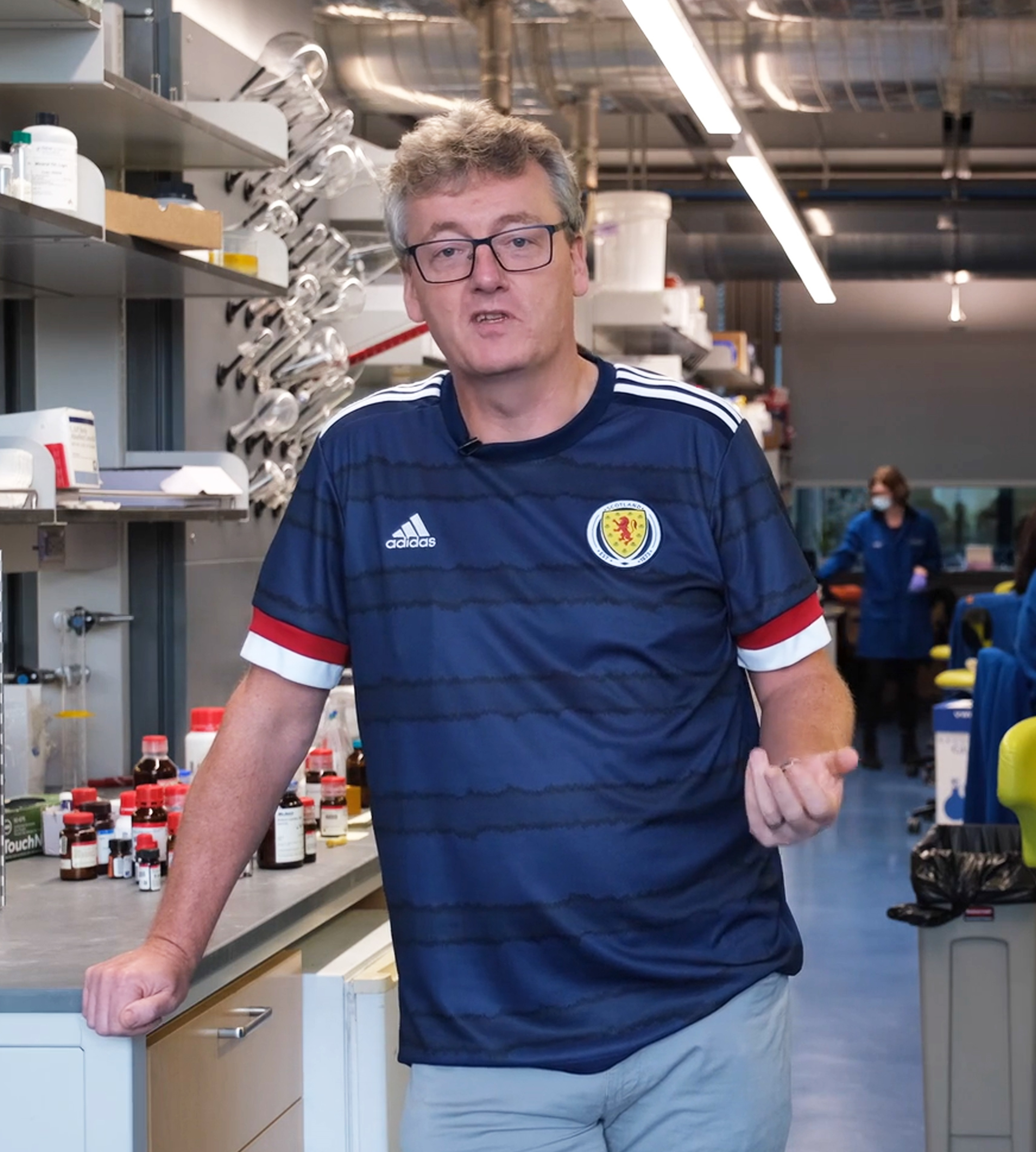
- MacMillan in 2021
- Born: David William Cross MacMillan; 16 March 1968 (age 58); Bellshill, Scotland
- Citizenship: United Kingdom; United States
- Education: Bellshill Academy; University of Glasgow (BSc); University of California, Irvine (MSc, PhD)
- Awards: Corday-Morgan medal Member of the National Academy of Sciences (2018); Nobel Prize in Chemistry (2021)
- Scientific career
- Workplaces: Princeton University; Ludwig Institute for Cancer Research; California Institute of Technology; University of California, Irvine; University of California, Berkeley; Harvard University
- Thesis: Stereocontrolled formation of bicyclic tetrahydrofurans and Enantioselective total synthesis of eunicellin diterpenes (1996)
- Doctoral advisor: Larry E. Overman
- Other academic advisors: Ernest W. Colvin; David A. Evans
- Doctoral students: Vy Dong, Tehshik Yoon

Sir David William Cross MacMillan (born 16 March 1968) is a Scottish chemist and the James S. McDonnell Distinguished University Professor of Chemistry at Princeton University, where he was also the chair of the Department of Chemistry from 2010 to 2015. He is also a Distinguished Scholar at the Princeton Branch of the Ludwig Institute for Cancer Research. He shared the 2021 Nobel Prize in Chemistry with Benjamin List "for the development of asymmetric organocatalysis". MacMillan used his share of the $1.14 million prize to establish the May and Billy MacMillan Foundation.

== Education and early life ==
MacMillan was born in Bellshill, North Lanarkshire, Scotland, in 1968 and grew up in nearby New Stevenston. His father was a steelworker, while his grandfather was a miner. He attended the local state-funded schools, New Stevenston Primary and Bellshill Academy, and credited his Scottish education and Scottish upbringing for his success.

He received his undergraduate degree in chemistry at the University of Glasgow, where he worked with Ernie Colvin.

In 1990, he left the UK to begin his doctoral studies under the direction of Professor Larry Overman at the University of California, Irvine. During this time, he focused on the development of new reaction methodology directed toward the stereocontrolled formation of bicyclic tetrahydrofurans. MacMillan's graduate studies culminated in the total synthesis of 7-(−)-deacetoxyalcyonin acetate, a eunicellin diterpenoid isolated from the soft coral Eunicella stricta. He earned his Ph.D. in 1996.

== Career and research ==
Upon receiving his Ph.D., MacMillan accepted a postdoctoral position with Professor David Evans at Harvard University. His postdoctoral studies centered on enantioselective catalysis, in particular, the design and development of Sn(II)-derived bisoxazoline complexes (Sn(II)box).

MacMillan began his independent research career as a member of the chemistry faculty at the University of California, Berkeley in July 1998. He joined the department of chemistry at Caltech in June 2000, where his group's research interests centered on new approaches to enantioselective catalysis. In 2004, he was appointed as the Earle C. Anthony Professor of Chemistry. He became the James S. McDonnell Distinguished University Professor at Princeton University in September 2006.

First generation MacMillan catalyst

He is considered to be one of the founders of organocatalysis. MacMillan's research group has made many advances in the field of asymmetric organocatalysis, and they have applied these new methods to the synthesis of a range of complex natural products. He developed chiral imidazolidinone catalysts. MacMillan catalysts are used in various asymmetric syntheses. Examples include Diels-Alder reactions, 1,3-dipolar cycloadditions, Friedel-Crafts alkylations or Michael additions.

MacMillan has also extensively developed photoredox catalysis for use in organic synthesis.

In the early 2020s, MacMillan expanded his research into chemical biology, including the development of µMap, a photocatalytic proximity-labeling platform that enables the mapping of molecular interactions at nanometer-scale resolution. The technology subsequently became a focus of his laboratory's research into biological systems, including cancer biology, and in 2025 he was appointed a Distinguished Scholar of the Princeton Branch of the Ludwig Institute for Cancer Research.

Between 2010 and 2014, MacMillan was the founding editor-in-chief of the journal Chemical Science, the flagship general chemistry journal published by the Royal Society of Chemistry.

As of March 2024, MacMillan has an h-index of 125 according to Google Scholar and of 115 according to Scopus.

== Honours and awards ==
MacMillan was knighted in the 2022 Birthday Honours for services to chemistry and science.

- 2002 – Sloan Research Fellowship
- 2004 – Corday-Morgan medal of Royal Institute of Chemistry
- 2012 – Elected a Fellow of the Royal Society (FRS)
- 2012 – Elected as a member of the American Academy of Arts and Sciences
- 2013 – Elected a Corresponding Fellow of the Royal Society of Edinburgh (FRSE)
- 2015 – Harrison Howe Award
- 2015 – Ernst Schering Prize
- 2017 – Ryoji Noyori Prize
- 2018 – Elected a member of the National Academy of Sciences
- 2021 – Nobel Prize in Chemistry
- 2024 – Honorary Ph.D, North Carolina State University

== List ==
- List of Nobel laureates affiliated with Princeton University
- List of Nobel laureates
