= Timothy F. Jamison =

American chemist

- Born: San Jose, California
- Education: University of California, Berkeley; Harvard University; ETH Zurich
- Scientific career
- Fields: Organic chemistry
- Workplaces: Massachusetts Institute of Technology; Harvard University
- Doctoral advisor: Stuart L. Schreiber

Timothy F. Jamison is a professor of Chemistry at the Massachusetts Institute of Technology.

== Early life and education ==
Tim Jamison was born in San Jose, CA and grew up in neighboring Los Gatos, CA. He received his undergraduate education at the University of California, Berkeley. A six-month research assistantship at ICI Americas in Richmond, CA under the mentorship of Dr. William G. Haag was his first experience in chemistry research. Upon returning to Berkeley, he joined the laboratory of Prof. Henry Rapoport and conducted undergraduate research in his group for nearly three years, the majority of which was under the tutelage of William D. Lubell (now at the University of Montreal). A Fulbright Scholarship supported ten months of research in Prof. Steven A. Benner’s laboratories at the ETH in Zürich, Switzerland, and thereafter he undertook his PhD studies at Harvard University with Prof. Stuart L. Schreiber. He then moved to the laboratory of Prof. Eric N. Jacobsen at Harvard University, where he was a Damon Runyon-Walter Winchell postdoctoral fellow.

== Career ==
=== MIT Professor ===
In July 1999, Jamison began his independent career at MIT, where his research program focuses on the development of new methods of organic synthesis and their implementation in the total synthesis of natural products. He was tenured in 2006.

On July 1, 2015, he became Head of MIT's Chemistry Department, saying "I am honored and delighted to have the opportunity to serve chemistry, the School of Science, and MIT.

=== Research ===
Jamison is an organic chemist whose research is focused on the discovery and application of new reactions and technologies for organic synthesis. Any of the transformations targeted are based on common structural motifs or functional group patterns present in molecules provided to us by nature.

Developing effective and reliable continuous flow protocols to improve reaction yield, selectivity and minimize safety risks relative to batch conditions. Included are continuous flow protocols to prepare b-amino alcohols, tetrazoles, asymmetric ketones, cyclic carbonates and amide bonds as well as DIBAL-H reductions of esters to aldehydes, oxidation of alcohols and aldehydes, hydrogen-free alkene reductions, couplings (Ullmann condensations, Sonogashira couplings) and a variety of transformations mediated by photoredox catalysis.

Streamlining multi-step processes: telescoping two or three step reactions into a single, continuous and uninterrupted reactor network to circumvent the need for isolation and/or purification of intermediates. Some examples include developing (a) a continuous protocol for the two-carbon homologation of esters to prepare (a) β-unsaturated esters with high yield and selectivity; (b) 2-functionalized phenols via benzyne-mediated in-line generation of arylmagnesium intermediates and aerobic oxidation; (c) developing a three-step continuous flow system which integrates in-line isocyanide formation and photochemical cyclization for preparing quinoxaline derivatives and (d) a two-step glycosylation and deprotection sequence to prepare 5’-deoxyribonucleoside pharmaceuticals.

Designing integrated continuous manufacturing strategies for preparing active pharmaceutical ingredients. Within a broader context, I also been involved in developing end-to-end manufacturing processes which handle a variety of intermediate reactions, separations, crystallizations as well as drying and formulation to generate active pharmaceutical ingredients in one controlled process.

Nickel–Catalyzed Carbon–Carbon Bond Formation. The majority of the transformations under investigation are carbon–carbon bond–forming reactions promoted by nickel catalysts. The group has discovered a variety of coupling reactions to join a number of different functional groups in highly regio–, stereo– and enantioselective fashion depending on the nature of the supporting ligands on nickel.

Epoxide–Opening Cascades. Over two decades ago, Koji Nakanishi proposed a provocative explanation for the structural and stereochemical similarities found across the ladder polyether family of natural products – the transformation of a polyepoxide into a ladder polyether via a cascade of epoxide–opening events. An ongoing effort in the group is the replication or emulation of such cascades. One aim is the efficient synthesis of these extremely complex natural products. In addition, explorations into a diverse set of epoxide–opening cyclizations and cascades may shed further light on the fundamental feasibility of Nakanishi’s hypothesis.

Target–Oriented Synthesis. In order to test the scope and the utility of newly developed methods, we strive to employ them in the total synthesis of natural products. Often these products are the original inspiration for the development of these methods. For example, it has been found that nickel–catalyzed reactions are compatible with a wide array of functional groups, making them useful in complex settings, such as fragment coupling or macrocyclization operations at a late stage in synthesis.

=== Honors and awards ===
Tim currently serves as the Associate Editor of Chemical Reviews. In 2014, he received the Council of Chemical Research Collaboration Award. Tim was awarded the MIT School of Science's Teaching Prize for Undergraduate Education in 2013, and in 2012, was named a Fellow of the Royal Society of Chemistry, receiving the Society's Merck Award that same year.

- Fulbright Fellow (1991)
- 3M Innovation Award (2000)
- National Science Foundation CAREER Award (2001)
- Boehringer Ingelheim New Investigator Award (2002)
- Paul M. Cook Career Development Chair (2002)
- Amgen Young Investigator Award (2003)
- GlaxoSmithKline Scholar Award (2004)
- Sloan Research Fellow (2004)
- JSPS Invitation Fellowship (2006)
- Arthur C. Cope Scholar Award (2011)
- Royal Society of Chemistry Merck Award (2012)
- Teaching Prize for Undergraduate Education, MIT School of Science (2013)
- Council of Chemical Research Collaboration Award (2014)
