= Song Lin (chemist) =

Chinese-American electrochemist

- Education: Harvard University; Peking University
- Scientific career
- Workplaces: Cornell University; University of California, Berkeley
- Thesis: Elucidation of the Cation-π Interaction in Small-Molecule Asymmetric Catalysis (2013)
- Doctoral advisor: Eric Jacobsen
- Other academic advisors: Christopher Chang (post-doctoral advisor)
- Website: https://songlinlab.stanford.edu/

Song Lin is a Chinese-American organic electrochemist who is a Tisch University Professor at Cornell University. His research involves the development of new synthetic organic methodologies that utilize electrochemistry to forge new chemical bonds.

He is an Associate Editor of the journal Organic Letters, and serves on the Early Career Advisory Board of Chemistry - A European Journal. He was named by Chemical & Engineering News as one of their Trailblazers of 2022, a feature highlighting LGBTQ+ chemists in academia. He received a MacArthur Fellowship in 2026.

== Early life and education ==
Lin was born in Tianjin. He became interested in science as a child, doing simple household experiments, and was supported by his high school chemistry teacher to pursue a career in research. He completed his bachelor's degree in chemistry (2008) at Peking University where he worked under the supervision of Zhangjie Shi. Lin moved to the United States for graduate studies and joined the organic chemistry department at Harvard University for doctoral research, where he researched small molecule asymmetric catalysis with Eric Jacobsen and was awarded a PhD in 2013.

== Research and career ==
Lin moved to the University of California, Berkeley for his postdoctoral research, where he worked in the lab of Christopher Chang. While studying electrocatalysis in Chang's lab, he became aware of the use of porous materials like covalent organic frameworks (COFs) to absorb carbon dioxide. In collaboration with the Yaghi group, Lin showed that porphyrin-containing COFs could catalyze the electrocatalytic reduction of CO_{2} to CO under applied current and in an aqueous environment.

Lin began his independent career at Cornell University where his group's research has focused on the identification of novel synthetic pathways for medicinally relevant compounds. He focuses on the use of electrochemistry to drive chemical reactions. Electrochemistry can make organic synthesis cheaper and more environmentally friendly. For example, Lin demonstrated an electrochemical approach to synthesize 1,2-diamines from alkenes, which are useful precursors to bioactive natural products, therapeutic agents, and molecular catalysts. More recently, Lin's group has developed a method to directly couple alkyl halides using electrochemistry, providing a promising approach towards this difficult chemical transformation. In 2026, Lin moved to Stanford University as a professor of chemistry where he was named a MacArthur Fellow for his work on electrochemical methods for constructing complex organic molecules.

== Awards and honors ==
- 2017 Thieme Chemistry Journal Award
- 2018 National Science Foundation CAREER Award
- 2019 MIT Technology Review Innovators Under 35
- 2019 Alfred P. Sloan Foundation Fellowship
- 2019 Office of Naval Research Young Investigator
- 2020 Princeton University Bristol-Myers Squibb Lectureship
- 2020 Research Corporation Cottrell Scholar Award
- 2021 American Chemical Society National Fresenius Award
- 2021 Camille Dreyfus Teacher-Scholar Award
- 2021 FMC New Investigator Award
- 2026 Thieme-IUPAC prize

== Selected publications ==
- Lin, Seong; Diercks, Christian; Yue-Biao Zhang; et al. (2015). "Covalent organic frameworks comprising cobalt porphyrins for catalytic CO₂ reduction in water". Science. 349 (6253): 1208–1213. doi:10.1126/science.aac8343. PMID 26292706. Wikidata Q40622899.
- Niankai Fu; Gregory S Sauer; Ambarneil Saha; Aaron Loo; Song Lin (2017). "Metal-catalyzed electrochemical diazidation of alkenes". Science. 357 (6351): 575–579. doi:10.1126/science.aan6206. PMID 28798126. Wikidata Q47326916.
- Diercks, Christian; Lin, Seong; Nikolay Kornienko; et al. (2017). "Reticular Electronic Tuning of Porphyrin Active Sites in Covalent Organic Frameworks for Electrocatalytic Carbon Dioxide Reduction". Journal of the American Chemical Society. 140 (3): 1116–1122. doi:10.1021/jacs.7b11940. PMID 29284263. Wikidata Q48335731.
