= Gregory C. Fu =

American chemist

Gregory Chung-Wei Fu
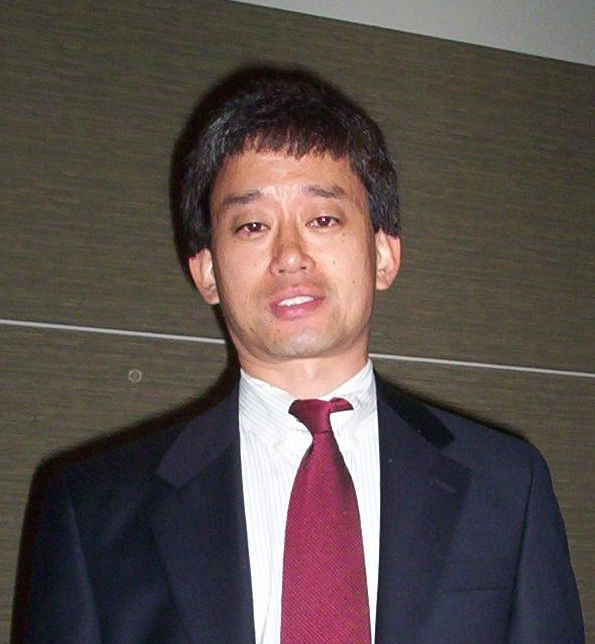
- Born: June 17, 1963 (age 63)
- Education: Massachusetts Institute of Technology (BS); Harvard University (PhD)
- Scientific career
- Fields: Organic chemistry
- Workplaces: Massachusetts Institute of Technology (1993–2012); California Institute of Technology (2012–)
- Thesis: The transition metal-catalyzed hydroboration reaction: synthetic applications and mechanistic studies (1991)
- Doctoral advisor: David A. Evans
- Other academic advisors: K. Barry Sharpless; Robert H. Grubbs
- Website: fugroup.caltech.edu

Gregory C. Fu is an American chemist who is a professor of organic chemistry at the California Institute of Technology, where he is the Norman Chandler Professor of Chemistry. The current research interests of the Fu laboratory include metal-catalyzed coupling reactions and the design of chiral catalysts. In particular, the group is focused on the development of nickel-catalyzed enantioselective cross-couplings of alkyl electrophiles and on copper-catalyzed carbon–heteroatom bond-forming reactions. The group works in collaboration with the laboratory of Professor Jonas C. Peters.

In 2014, he was elected as a member of the National Academy of Sciences. He was awarded an Arthur C. Cope Scholar Award in 1998–1999. He was awarded the Elias J. Corey Award from the American Chemical Society in 2004.

Professor Fu is also the inventor of the ferrocene analogous planar DMAP catalyst.

== Education ==
Gregory Fu received his B.S. from the Massachusetts Institute of Technology in 1985, where he worked in the laboratory of Professor Karl Barry Sharpless, then completed his Ph.D. at Harvard University in 1991 under Professor David A. Evans. He worked as a postdoctoral fellow with Robert H. Grubbs at the California Institute of Technology from 1991 to 1993, before accepting an assistant professor position at the Massachusetts Institute of Technology, where he worked from 1993 to 2012. In 2012, he was appointed the Altair Professor of Chemistry at Caltech. Fu is currently the Norman Chandler Professor of Chemistry at Caltech.

== Awards and honors ==
- Received the Elias J. Corey Award of the American Chemical Society in 2004
- Received the Mukaiyama Award of the Society of Synthetic Organic Chemistry of Japan in 2006
- Elected to the American Academy of Arts and Sciences, 2007
- Received the Award for Creative Work in Synthetic Organic Chemistry of the American Chemical Society in 2012
- Elected to the National Academy of Sciences, 2014
- Received the Herbert C. Brown Award of the American Chemical Society in 2018
- Received the Arthur C. Cope Award of the American Chemical Society in 2026
