= Manfred T. Reetz =

German chemist (1943–2026)

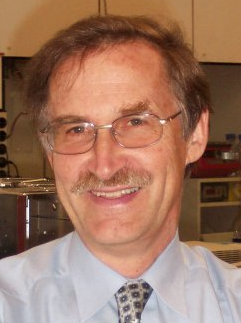
- Reetz in 2008
- Born: 13 August 1943; Hirschberg, Gau Lower Silesia, Germany (now Jelenia Góra, Poland)
- Died: 23 April 2026 (aged 82)
- Citizenship: Germany
- Education: University of Göttingen (PhD, 1969); University of Michigan; Washington University
- Awards: Leibniz Prize (1989); Nagoya Gold Medal Award (2000); Centenary Prize (2002); Ziegler Prize (2005); Prelog Medal (2006); Arthur C. Cope Award (2009); Tetrahedron Prize (2011); Otto Hahn Prize (2011); IKCOC Prize (2012)
- Scientific career
- Fields: Organic chemistry
- Workplaces: Max Planck Institute for Coal Research, Mülheim
- Doctoral advisor: Ulrich Schöllkopf

Manfred Theodor Reetz (13 August 1943 – 23 April 2026) was a German chemist and professor of organic chemistry, who served as director of the Max Planck Institute for Coal Research from 1991 until 2011. His research focused on directed evolution, enzymes in organic chemistry, and stereoselective biocatalysis.

== Life and career ==
Reetz was born in Hirschberg, Gau Lower Silesia on 13 August 1943, and immigrated to the US in 1952. After studying chemistry at Washington University in St. Louis and the University of Michigan, he returned to Germany to obtain his Ph.D. under Ulrich Schöllkopf at the University of Göttingen. He subsequently worked as a postdoctoral researcher at the University of Marburg where he completed his habilitation in 1978. After two years at the University of Bonn, he returned to Marburg as full professor in 1980. In 1991 he was appointed director of the Max Planck Institute for Coal Research in Mülheim, a position that he held until 2011.

Reetz died on 23 April 2026, at the age of 82.

== Honors and awards ==
Among the awards that Reetz received are the Leibniz Prize (1989), the Nagoya Gold Medal Award of Organic Chemistry (2000), the RSC Centenary Prize (2002), the Karl Ziegler Prize (2005), the Prelog Medal (2006), the ACS Arthur C. Cope Award (2009), the Tetrahedron Prize (2011), the Otto Hahn Prize (2011), and the International Kyoto Conference on New Aspects of Organic Chemistry (IKCOC) Prize (2012). He was elected to the German Academy of Sciences Leopoldina in 1997. He was elected a foreign member of the Royal Netherlands Academy of Arts and Sciences in 2005.

== Selected publications ==
- Reetz, Manfred (2016). Directed evolution of selective enzymes : catalysts for organic chemistry and biotechnology. Weinheim, Germany: Wiley-VCH. ISBN 978-3-527-31660-1. OCLC 958482460.
