= Ohyun Kwon =

American chemist

- Education: Seoul National University; Columbia University
- Scientific career
- Workplaces: University of California, Los Angeles; Harvard University
- Thesis: Studies in syntheses of the natural products (1998)
- Doctoral advisor: Samuel J. Danishefsky

Ohyun Kwon is an American chemist who is a professor at the University of California, Los Angeles. Her research considers new methodologies for organic transformations and the development of chiral catalysts.

== Early life and education ==
Kwon was born in South Korea. She attended the Seoul National University, where she majored in chemistry. She moved to the United States for graduate studies, first joining Columbia University to work in the research group of Samuel J. Danishefsky. Her doctorate considered the synthesis of glycolipid Ganglio-N-tetraosylceramide (asialo GM1). Afterwards, Kwon moved to Harvard University as a postdoctoral fellow in the laboratory of Stuart Schreiber, where she worked on a diversity oriented synthesis of macrocycles and multi-cyclic compounds.

== Research and career ==
Kwon was appointed to the faculty at the University of California, Los Angeles (UCLA) in 2001. Her research includes the development of chiral catalysts, target-oriented synthesis of natural compounds and diversity oriented synthesis of natural-product like molecules. She has explored the activation of the C(sp^{3})–C(sp^{2}) bond of alkenes that is common in natural products. These can be used for the generation of biologically relevant molecules and total synthesis. Kwon developed organic, phosphine-based catalysts for chemical reactions. She has shown that phosphine-catalysed annulations can be used to create natural products of medical significance.

Kwon showed that chiral phosphines can be used for asymmetric catalysis, including DIPAMP, DIOP and BINAP. These phosphines include stereogenic phosphorus centres, axial chirality and stereogenic carbon centres. Kwon developed a family of phosphines with stereogenic carbon and phosphorus centres that are available from Sigma-Aldrich. Kwon also proposes devices to help treat arrhythmia with molecules from phosphine catalysis.

== Awards and honors ==
- 2018 University of California Center for Accelerated Innovation Technology Development Grant
- 2019 Novartis Chemistry Lectureship Award
- 2019 Herbert Newby McCoy Award
- 2024 Arthur C. Cope Scholar Award

== Selected publications ==
- Hongchao Guo; Yi Chiao Fan; Zhanhu Sun; Yang Wu; Ohyun Kwon (2018). "Phosphine Organocatalysis". Chemical Reviews. 118 (20): 10049–10293. doi:10.1021/acs.chemrev.8b00081. PMC 6218176. PMID 30260217. Wikidata Q57790695.
- Xue-Feng Zhu; Jie Lan; Ohyun Kwon (2003). "An expedient phosphine-catalyzed [4 + 2] annulation: synthesis of highly functionalized tetrahydropyridines". Journal of the American Chemical Society. 125 (16): 4716–4717. doi:10.1021/ja0344009. PMID 12696883. Wikidata Q44404323.
- Zhiming Wang; Xingzhu Xu; Ohyun Kwon (2014). "Phosphine catalysis of allenes with electrophiles". Chemical Society Reviews. 43 (9): 2927–2940. doi:10.1039/c4cs00054d. PMC 4059616. PMID 24663290. Wikidata Q38198956.
