= Eric Jacobsen (chemist) =

American chemist

Eric Niels Jacobsen
- Born: February 22, 1960 (age 66); New York City, New York
- Education: New York University; University of California, Berkeley
- Known for: Jacobsen epoxidation Hydrogen-bond catalysis
- Awards: Bristol-DTC-Syngenta Award, Remsen Award, Fannie–Cox Teaching Award, Harvard University
- Scientific career
- Fields: Chemistry
- Workplaces: Harvard University
- Thesis: Synthesis and Reactions of Dinuclear Transition Metal Complexes Containing Bridging Ligands Relevant to Heterogeneous Catalysis (1986)
- Doctoral advisor: Robert G. Bergman
- Other academic advisors: Karl Barry Sharpless; Yorke E. Rhodes
- Doctoral students: Emily Balskus; Sukbok Chang; Abigail Doyle; Song Lin
- Other notable students: Post-docs: Sarah E Reisman; Tehshik Yoon; Timothy F. Jamison; James L. Leighton; Robert Knowles; Mark Levin; Matthew Sigman; M. Christina White

Eric Niels Jacobsen (born February 22, 1960, in New York City, New York) is the Sheldon Emery Professor of Chemistry and former chair of the department of chemistry and chemical biology at Harvard University. He is a prominent figure in the field of organic chemistry and is best known for the development of the Jacobsen epoxidation and other work in selective catalysis.

== Early life and education ==
Jacobsen was born on February 22, 1960, in New York City. Jacobsen attended New York University for his undergraduate studies, graduating with his B.S. in 1982. He attended the University of California, Berkeley for graduate school, earning his Ph.D. in 1986 under the tutelage of Robert G. Bergman. He subsequently joined the laboratory of Barry Sharpless, then at MIT, as an NIH Postdoctoral Fellow. He began his independent career as an assistant professor at the University of Illinois at Urbana-Champaign in 1988. In 1993 he moved to Harvard as a full professor.

== Notable contributions ==
Jacobsen has developed catalysts for asymmetric epoxidation, hydrolytic kinetic resolution and desymmetrization of epoxides, asymmetric pericyclic reactions, and asymmetric additions to imines.

== Awards ==
- 2013 – Remsen Award
- 2024 – Tetrahedron Prize
