= Erick M. Carreira =

American organic chemist

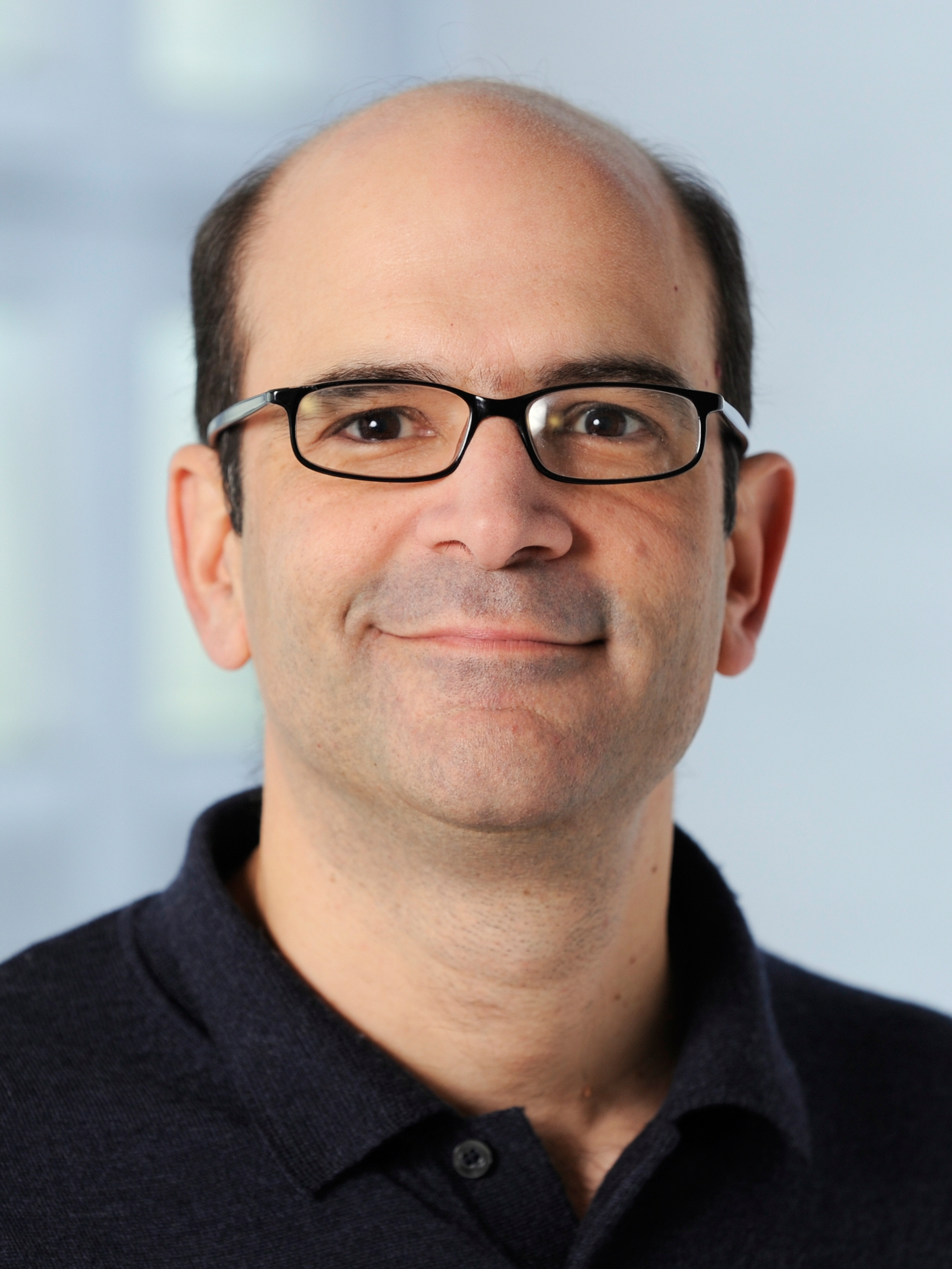
- Carreira in 2010
- Born: 1963 (age 62–63); Havana, Cuba
- Education: University of Illinois Urbana–Champaign (BS); Harvard University (PhD)
- Known for: Total synthesis
- Scientific career
- Fields: Synthetic organic chemistry
- Workplaces: California Institute of Technology; ETH Zürich
- Doctoral advisor: David A. Evans
- Website: www.carreira.ethz.ch

Erick M. Carreira (born 1963) is a Cuban-born American organic chemist and professor at ETH Zürich. He is known for his research group's work in total synthesis projects, particularly asymmetric synthesis of complex natural products. He became the editor-in-chief of the Journal of the American Chemical Society in 2021.

== Early life and education ==
Carreira was born in 1963 in Havana, Cuba. He received his B.S. in 1984 from the University of Illinois at Urbana–Champaign, where he worked with Scott E. Denmark. He then began graduate work at Harvard University as a student of David A. Evans and received his Ph.D. in 1990. He was a postdoctoral fellow at the California Institute of Technology with Peter Dervan until he joined the faculty there in 1992.

== Academic career ==
Carreira began his independent research career on the Caltech faculty and became a full professor in 1997. While there, he received several awards for successful new faculty and for his skilled teaching. He has been a full professor of chemistry at ETH Zürich since 1998.

Carreira has coauthored and coedited several major reference works in the total synthesis field, including volume 93 of Organic Syntheses. In 2019, Carreira was appointed as the editor-in-chief of Organic Letters published by the American Chemical Society, where he had previously served as an associate editor for 18 years. In April 2020, Carreira was elected for a membership in the National Academy of Sciences of the United States. In September 2020, he was appointed chief editor of the Journal of the American Chemical Society. Carreira is the first Hispanic American scientist to hold the position.

=== Carreira letters ===
The appointment reignited debate over a 1996 letter in which Carreira highlighted his expectations for long working hours in his research group, which were viewed as inappropriately demanding and demeaning by other professors. In response, Carreira released a statement disavowing the approach reflected in the letter. Carreira began his appointment in January 2021, succeeding Peter Stang. Carreira also wrote a letter in 1999 highlighting expectations for the scheduling of a student's thesis defense and non-permanence of PhD completion scheduling at Carreira's sole discretion. The terms of Carreira's request included restriction of all vacation time during the thesis writing process and held the student accountable for financial liabilities such as "rental agreements [and] airline change fees" incurred should Carreira decide that he needed to change the date of the defense . This letter was also published in response to Carreira's appointment to his JACS position.

== Research ==
Research in Carreira's group focuses on total synthesis, particularly asymmetric (that is, enantioselective) synthesis of complex natural products. The group also works on applications of these methods to development of catalysts and to medicinal chemistry.

== Awards and honors ==
- Beckman Young Investigators Award, 1993
- Fresenius Award, Phi Lambda Upsilon, 1996
- American Chemical Society Award in Pure Chemistry, 1997
- Thieme-IUPAC Prize, 2002
- Ryoji Noyori Prize, 2021

== Personal life ==
He has always enjoyed animals and owns 15 birds.
