= The Journal of Organic Chemistry =

- Discipline: Organic chemistry
- Language: English
- Edited by: Scott J. Miller

Publication details
- History: 1936–present
- Publisher: American Chemical Society (United States)
- Frequency: Biweekly
- Impact factor: 3.3 (2023)

Standard abbreviations
- ISO 4: J. Org. Chem.

Indexing
- CODEN: JOCEAH
- ISSN: 0022-3263 (print); 1520-6904 (web)
- LCCN: 38005884

Links
- Journal homepage

The Journal of Organic Chemistry, colloquially known as JOC, is a peer-reviewed scientific journal for original contributions of fundamental research in all branches of theory and practice in organic and bioorganic chemistry. It is published by the publishing arm of the American Chemical Society, with 24 issues per year. According to the Journal Citation Reports, the journal had a 2023 impact factor of 3.3 and it is the journal that received the most cites (100,091 in 2017) in the field of organic chemistry. According to Web of Knowledge (and as December 2012), eleven papers from the journal have received more than 1,000 citations, with the most cited paper having received 7,967 citations. The current editor-in-chief is Scott J. Miller from Yale University.

== Indexing ==
J. Org. Chem. is currently indexed in:

- Chemical Abstracts Service (CAS)
- SCOPUS
- EBSCOhost
- British Library
- PubMed
- Ovid
- Web of Science
- Gale Group
- ProQuest
- CABI
- SwetsWise

== See also ==
- Organic Letters
- Organometallics
