= Gregory S. Girolami =

American inorganic chemist

Gregory Scott Girolami
- Born: 1956 (age 69–70)
- Education: University of Texas at Austin B.S. University of California at Berkeley Ph.D. (1981)
- Scientific career
- Fields: Chemistry
- Workplaces: University of Illinois at Urbana–Champaign
- Thesis: Alkyl and Lewis-Base Derivatives of Compounds which contain Multiple Metal-Metal Bonds (1981)
- Doctoral advisor: Richard A. Andersen
- Other academic advisors: Geoffrey Wilkinson
- Doctoral students: Cheon Jinwoo, Wenbin Lin, Julia L. Brumaghim, Timothy H. Warren
- Website: faculty.scs.illinois.edu/girolami/

Gregory S. Girolami (born October 16, 1956) is the William H. and Janet G. Lycan Professor of Chemistry at the University of Illinois Urbana-Champaign. His research focuses on the synthesis, properties, and reactivity of new inorganic, organometallic, and solid state species. Girolami has been elected a fellow of the American Association for the Advancement of Science, the Royal Society of Chemistry, and the American Chemical Society.

== Early life and education ==
He was born in 1956 in Honolulu, Hawaii, and grew up in California, Mexico, and Missouri. He started college at the age of 16, and four years later received B.S. degrees both in chemistry and in physics from the University of Texas at Austin. He obtained his Ph.D. in 1981 from the University of California, Berkeley with Prof. Richard A. Andersen. Girolami's doctoral research centered on the chemistry of quadruply-bonded dinuclear transition metal complexes. Thereafter, he was a NATO postdoctoral fellow with Sir Geoffrey Wilkinson at the Imperial College of Science and Technology, and his work there focused on the synthesis and chemistry of first-row transition metal-alkyl complexes.

== Independent career ==
Girolami joined the faculty of the University of Illinois at Urbana-Champaign in 1983. He has served as Head of the Chemistry Department twice, first from 2000 until 2005 and again from 2013 to 2016.

He is the author of several textbooks, including X-ray Crystallography and Synthesis and Technique in Inorganic Chemistry. He was the co-editor of volume 36 of Inorganic Syntheses.

Girolami is also co-founder of a university spin-off company, Tiptek LLC, which manufactures ultrasharp probe tips for use in scanning tunneling microscopy and for fault diagnosis and testing of integrated circuits. The company has patented its field-directed sputter sharpening (FDSS) technology, which was originally developed in the laboratories of Girolami and fellow UIUC Professor Joseph Lyding.

== Research ==
To date, Girolami's independent research career has encompassed five major themes: mechanistic studies of organometallic reactions such as the polymerization of alkenes and the activation of saturated alkanes, the chemical vapor deposition of thin films from designed molecular precursors, the construction and study of molecular analogs of the photosynthetic reaction center, actinide chemistry, and the synthesis of new molecule-based magnetic materials. His research approach emphasizes the synthesis of new inorganic and organometallic compounds and materials, investigations of their mechanisms of formation, and measurements and interpretations of their physical properties.

=== Organometallic chemistry ===
Girolami's early work focused on the synthesis of transition metal compounds with metal-hydrogen and metal-carbon bonds, especially those possessing unusual electronic structures. In 1989, Girolami and Morse showed that [Zr(CH_{3})_{6}]^{2−} was of trigonal prismatic molecular geometry as indicated by X-ray crystallography. This rare molecular geometry was attributed to second-order Jahn-Teller distortions in this d^{0} metal complex. Girolami's group accurately predicted that other d^{0} ML_{6} species such as [Nb(CH_{3})_{6}]^{−}, [Ta(CH_{3})_{6}]^{−}, and W(CH_{3})_{6} would also prove to have trigonal prismatic geometry. Girolami also discovered the first titanium alkyl/alkene complex in 1993, which models the key intermediate in Ziegler-Natta catalysis. Later model studies of C-H, B-H, and Si-H activation by transition metal complexes led to his current work on approaches to the isolation of stable alkane complexes.

=== Chemical vapor deposition ===
In the mid-1980s Girolami began research on the chemical vapor deposition (CVD) of thin films, especially of phases containing transition metals. Girolami studied the chemical design of new CVD precursors. He investigated copper(I) compounds for copper CVD, an approach that is now a key fabrication step for integrated circuits. His mechanistic studies of CVD processes involved transition metals, and these efforts have recently resulted in the development of low-temperature CVD to achieve the deposition of conformal thin films, in work carried out in collaboration with Professor John Abelson of Illinois' Department of Materials Science and Engineering. Most recently, he discovered a new class of highly volatile CVD precursors containing the aminodiboranate ligand.

=== Molecular analogs of the photosynthetic reaction center ===
In a now-concluded project, Girolami studied the chemistry and photophysics of bis(porphyrinate) metal sandwich complexes in collaboration with Illinois Professor of Chemistry Kenneth S. Suslick. These complexes were proposed to mimic the conversion of light to chemical energy in photosynthesis. Girolami's group synthesized bis(porphyrin) complexes of thorium, uranium, zirconium, and hafnium, and showed that these complexes displayed photophysical properties similar to those of the “special pair”, a chlorophyll dimer present in the photosystem I reaction center.

=== Actinide chemistry ===
Overlapping with Girolami's interest in bis(porphryin) complexes that mimic the photosynthetic reaction center, the Girolami group has also studied actinide chemistry.

=== Magnetic materials ===
In the mid-1990s, Girolami began an investigation of the synthesis of new magnetic solids via a building block approach, publishing in Science in 1995. Girolami also reported metal-substituted analogs of Prussian blue that have magnetic ordering temperatures above 100 °C.

== Awards ==
Girolami has received numerous awards for his research, including the Office of Naval Research Young Investigator Award, a Sloan Foundation Fellowship, a Dreyfus Teacher-Scholar Award, and a University Scholar Award. He has been honored by UIUC with a Campus Award for Excellence in Graduate and Professional Teaching, for the introduction of a graduate class in inorganic chemistry covering group theory and electronic correlation methods.
