= Patrick Holland =

Patrick Holland may refer to:

- Patrick Holland (author) (born 1977), Australian novelist
- Patrick Holland (criminal) (died 2009), Irish career criminal
- Patrick Holland (ice hockey) (born 1992), Canadian ice hockey player
- Pat Holland (born 1950), English former footballer who played for West Ham United
- Pat Holland (snowboarder) (born c. 1980), won a Bronze Medal at the 2009–10 FIS Snowboard World Cup, younger brother of Nate Holland
- Patrick L. Holland (born 1971), American chemist

== See also ==
- Patrick Rolland, French ice hockey player
