= Andrew R. Barron (chemist) =

British chemist

- Born: 20 May 1962 (age 64); Welwyn Garden City, England
- Title: Sêr Cymru Chair of Low Carbon Energy and Environment; Charles W. Duncan Jr.-Welch Foundation Chair in Chemistry; Professor of Materials Science & Nano Engineering
- Spouse: Merrie Barron

Academic background
- Education: Imperial College
- Doctoral advisor: Geoffrey Wilkinson

Academic work
- Discipline: Chemistry
- Sub-discipline: Organometallics, Nano Engineering, Energy, Environment
- Institutions: Swansea University; Rice University

Andrew R. Barron (born 20 May 1962) is a British chemist, academic, and entrepreneur. He is the Sêr Cymru Chair of Low Carbon Energy and Environment at Swansea University, and the Charles W. Duncan Jr.-Welch Foundation Chair in Chemistry at Rice University. He is the founder and director of Energy Safety Research Institute (ESRI) at Swansea University, which consolidates the energy research at the University with a focus on environmental impact and future security. At Rice University, he leads a Research Group and has served as Associate Dean for Industry Interactions and Technology Transfer.

Barron’s current focus is on implementation of economically viable carbon capture, utilization, and storage technology including mineralization and biorefinery. He is a proponent of demonstrating new technologies through the concept of scaled pilots on industrial relevant locations, and in particular the concept of TRL jumping.

Most of Barron's work has revolved around the study of nanoparticles and their applications. Early on, he studied how the structure of a molecule could overcome thermodynamic control and create new solid state structures. Some of his early work also dealt with alumoxanes and ceramic nanomaterials. In the early 2000s, his research began to focus on carbon nanomaterials, the functionalization of fullerenes and single walled carbon nanotubes. Later, application of nanotechnology to energy problems became the focal point of his work. He has authored over 440 papers and 6 books, including a book co-authored with his wife, Merrie Barron, entitled Project Management for Scientists and Engineers.

Barron is the co-founder of multiple companies and he was a co-founder of the Rice Alliance.

Barron has received several awards for his research and work. He was named one of the Top 100 Influential People in 2025, and is the recipient of the Star of Asia International Award (2019), and the first Welch Foundation Norman Hackerman Award in Chemical Research (2002). In 2011 Barron was awarded the World Technology Award for Materials, which is award by World Technology Network. in association with TIME, Fortune, CNN, Science magazine and Technology Review across 20 categories for ‘innovative work of the greatest likely long-term significance’ to humanity. One of that year's fellow WTA Award winners was Steve Jobs for the iPhone. He is a fellow of the Royal Society of Chemistry.

== Early life and education ==
Barron was born in Welwyn Garden City, and brought up in Farnham, Surrey, where he attended Heath End School and Farnham Sixth Form College. In 1983, Barron completed his BSc in chemistry from Imperial College. Subsequently, he received his PhD degree in 1986 from Imperial College under the supervision of Geoffrey Wilkinson.

After completing his PhD, Barron moved to the United States and joined University of Texas at Austin for his post-doctoral research, which dealt with the chemistry of multiple bonds to phosphorus and carbon. He published the first structural characterization of a CP triple bond in 1988 in a paper he co-authored with Alan Cowley. In 1987, he joined Harvard University as an assistant professor of chemistry and was promoted to associate professor in 1991.

== Later career ==
Barron left Harvard University in 1995, when he joined Rice University as professor of Chemistry and Materials Science. He stepped down from his position at Gallia in 1997. In 1998, he was appointed as the Charles W. Duncan Jr.-Welch Foundation Chair in Chemistry at Rice University.

Following his studies on ceramic nanoparticles and the discovery of their applications, he founded Oxane Materials in 2002. The company developed nanoproducts with applications in the field of energy. Building on his research with nanoparticles, Barron founded Natcore Technology in 2004 and joined the scientific advisory board of the company. The company manufactures nanoparticles and technology with applications in the solar sectors.

From 2006 to 2008, he served as the Associate Dean of Industry Interactions and Technology Transfer at the Rice University. In 2019 he was appointed as the Prince of Wales Visiting Innovator with an appointment at the University of Wales. In 2013 he was appointed as the Sêr Cymru Chair of Low Carbon Energy and Environment, Swansea University. His research in the field of energy and environment resulted in his foundation of the Energy Safety Research Institute (ESRI), with the vision of "building the bridge to a sustainable, affordable and secure energy future." ESRI was housed in the first BREEAM Outstanding Building in Wales.

Barron is the editor of Journal of Nanomaterials since 2013 and Scientific Reports since 2014. He is also part of the editorial boards of Main Group Chemistry and Materials Science in Semiconductor Processing. Barron has served on the advisory board of King Abdullah University of Science and Technology, Zhu Zhou International Research Institute China, and Yellow River Delta Efficient Eco-economic Development.

== Research ==
=== Molecular control over solid state structure ===
In the early 1990s, Barron developed interest in studying how the structure of a molecule could overcome thermodynamic control and create new solid state structures. As such, he synthesized a class of cubic Gallium chalcogenide compounds and showed that a new meta-stable phase could be synthesized.

=== Alumoxanes ===
Following from his work on the chalcogenides, Barron was the first person to crystallographically characterize an alkylalumoxane in 1993. These structures were spectroscopically consistent with methylalumoxane and he showed that despite being octet molecules they had significant Lewis acidity, he termed this as "Latent Lewis acidity", and showed that this mechanism applied to a number of MAO style polymerization systems. Barron's 3-dimensional model has been evolved by others but is essentially the same as now widely accepted.

=== Ceramic nanomaterials ===
While investigating MAO-like structures, Barron noticed the relationship between clusters and minerals, at the same time he became interested in metalloxane polymers. He determined that these "polymers" were actually nanoparticles. Furthermore, he showed that these metal oxide nanoparticles could be chemically made by a top-down approach from minerals with which they shared their structures. With the ability to make a range of nanoparticles with different functional groups and control over size, Barron found that the structure and physical properties of macroscopic materials could be controlled by alterations at the nanometer scale.

Barron was the first to discover that nanoparticle derived ceramics could be designed to have intra-granular porosity, meaning that the pores are within the crystal grain rather than between the crystal grains as normally observed. This had implications in composites and in membranes and separation processes. Through his research, Barron developed a process that forms hollow spheres of ceramic with exceptional crush strength.

Barron rationalized that if hollow ceramic spheres could be made on a large scale, they could replace dense ceramics being used in oil extraction and minimize waste. He created a spin-off company to commercialize this technology. In 2010, Barron and his team, on the request of U.S. Navy, developed a ceramic membrane with microscale pores that could filter out virus contaminants from waters and protect divers, which was later applied to COVID-19 PPE, and also the basis of a process to separate hydrocarbon out of produced water.

=== Carbon nanomaterials ===
Barron investigated the impact of a fullerene on wide range of systems. Initial work was concerned with the toxicity on various cell types. The results of this work demonstrated that inclusion of C_{60} into a peptide structure drastically lowered any toxicity effects.

In his later work, Barron studied catalysis with growth of single walled carbon nanotubes (SWCNTs) pioneering the concept of amplification of a CNT. Other work includes measuring electrical properties of individual CNTs, and using them to absorbs cadmium, cobalt, copper, mercury, nickel and lead from contaminated water.

=== Environmental research ===
In the mid 2010s, Barron returned to the issue of water purification. He has investigated the nano control over the surface of a material that allows for the creation of superhydrophilic surfaces that allow for separation of oil and water without fouling. In this area, his research focused on energy problems including sustainable resources and waste recovery, reducing the impact of hydrocarbon energy sources, carbon dioxide valorisation and long-term sequestration and the next generation of the energy distribution.

== Entrepreneurship ==
Barron is a serial entrepreneur. In 1992 whilst at Harvard University, Barron founded Gallia Inc. that was sold to TriQuint Semiconductor in 1995. In 2001 Barron co-founded a Rice University spin-out to develop silicon solar cell technologies, Natcore technology, which was coincidentally founded on 9/11. Oxane Materials was set up for the commercialization of nano-technology-enhanced propping agents that addressed critical oil and gas technical challenges.Based upon the superhydrophilic functionality of ceramic membranes, Apex Water Solutions was founded in 2019 to implement large scale water treatment for the energy industry.

In 2019, Apex Water Solutions was founded to develop large-scale water treatment systems for the energy industry based on superhydrophilic ceramic membrane technology. The same membrane functionality was later applied in the development of FXI Inc.’s antiviral X-mask personal protective equipment.

MiDAS Green Innovations was established in 2019 to coordinate multiple technologies related to industrial decarbonization, including carbon capture, utilization, and sequestration.

== Personal life ==
Barron lives with his wife, Merrie Barron, in both Swansea (Wales) and Houston (Texas). Since he moved to Texas in the 1990s, he has participated in motor racing as a sport. In 1999 American Lemans Series, he was team principle for team in the GTS class. He participated in the final season of USRRC under Ross Racing. Barron has previously raced Lotus Seven, Caterham Seven, and Lotus Type 61 Formula Ford. He has been SW Division SCCA E-Production Champion, 2013 Monoposto Formula Ford Champion, 2013 SVRA Group 2 Sprint Series Champion and 2014 Monoposto Formula Ford Champion. In 2018, he raced FIA Formula Opel Racing with a Formula Vauxhall Lotus.

== Awards and honors ==
- 1983 - HVA Briscoe Prize
- 1987 - Du Pont Young Faculty Fellow
- 1991 - Meldola Medal and Prize by Royal Society of Chemistry
- 1992 to 1994 - Alcoa Directors Fellowship
- 1995 - Corday Morgan Medal and Prize
- 1995 - Fellow, Royal Society of Chemistry
- 1997 - Hümboldt Senior Scientist Research Award
- 2002 - Welch Foundation Norman Hackerman Award in Chemical Research
- 2009 - Prince of Wales Visiting Innovator
- 2011 - Lifetime Achievement Award in Nanotechnology
- 2011 - World Technology Award (Materials)
- 2013 - Applied Inorganic Chemistry Award (Royal Society of Chemistry)
- 2016 - Erasmus+ Vilnius University
- 2019 - Star of Asia Award
- 2020 - Adjunct Professor University of Technology Brunei

== Bibliography ==
=== Books ===
- Alumoxanes: Rationalization of Black Box Materials (1993)
- Covalent Ceramics II: Volume 327: Non-Oxides (1994)
- Chemistry of Electronic Materials: From Raw Materials to Integrated Circuit. (2010)
- Project Management (2013)
- Chemistry of the Main Group Elements. (2014)
- Physical Methods in Chemistry and Nano Science. 2018

=== Selected papers ===
- Hydrolysis of tri-tert-butylaluminum: The First Structural Characterization of Alkylalumoxanes [(R_{2}Al)2O]_{n} and (RAlO)_{n}. Journal of the American Chemical Society (1993)
- Three-coordinate Aluminum is not a Prerequisite for Catalytic Activity in the Zirconocene-alumoxane Polymerization of Ethylene. Journal of the American Chemical Society (1995)
- From Minerals to Materials: Synthesis of Alumoxanes from the Reaction of Boehmite with Carboxylic Acids. Journal of Materials Chemistry (1995)
- Single Wall Carbon Nanotube Amplification: En route to a Type-specific Growth Mechanism. Journal of the American Chemical Society (2006)
- Effects of Mechanical Flexion on the Penetration of Fullerene Amino Acid-derivatized Peptide Nanoparticles Through Skin. Nano Letters (2007)
- Synthesis, Characterization, and Carbon Dioxide Absorption of Covalently Attached Polyethyleneimine-functionalized Single-wall Carbon Nanotubes. ACS Nano (2008)
- High-yield Organic Dispersions of Unfunctionalized Graphene. Nano Letters (2009)
- Nitrene addition to exfoliated graphene: a one-step route to highly functionalized graphene, Chemical Communications (2010)
- Increasing the efficiency of single walled carbon nanotube amplification by Fe–Co catalysts through the optimization of CH4/H2 partial pressures, Nano letters (2011)
- Organic compounds in produced waters from shale gas wells, Environmental Science: Processes & Impacts (2014)
- Branched hydrocarbon low surface energy materials for superhydrophobic nanoparticle derived surfaces, ACS Applied Materials & Interfaces (2015)
- Easily Regenerated Readily Deployable Absorbent for Heavy Metal Removal from Contaminated Water, Scientific Reports (2017)
- Spatial and contamination dependent electrical properties of carbon nanotubes, Nano Letters (2017)
- Superhydrophilic Functionalization of Microfiltration Ceramic Membranes Enables Separation of Hydrocarbons from Frac and Produced Water. Scientific Reports (2018)
