= Patrick L. Holland =

American inorganic chemist

Patrick Leon Holland
- Born: 1971 (age 54–55); Pennsylvania
- Education: University of California, Berkeley Ph.D. (1997) Princeton University A.B. (1993) Terry Parker High School
- Scientific career
- Fields: Organometallic chemistry, Bioinorganic chemistry, Coordination chemistry, Catalysis
- Workplaces: Yale University (2013-present) University of Rochester (2000-2013) University of Minnesota (1997-2000)
- Thesis: Studies of cyclopentadienylnickel amido complexes (1997)
- Doctoral advisor: Robert G. Bergman and Richard A. Andersen
- Other academic advisors: William Tolman
- Website: holland.chem.yale.edu

Patrick L. Holland (born 1971) is the Conkey P. Whitehead Professor of Chemistry at Yale University. Holland's research focuses on low-coordinate and high-spin coordination complexes of iron and cobalt, that react with small molecules such as alkenes, arenes, and N_{2}.

== Early life and education ==
Holland was born in 1971 in Pennsylvania. During his childhood, he lived in Ohio until he was 12, when his family moved to Florida. Holland attended Terry Parker High School in Jacksonville, Florida, graduating in 1989. He then attended Princeton University, graduating with his A.B. in 1993. Following graduation, Holland pursued graduate studies at the University of California, Berkeley with Prof. Robert G. Bergman and Prof. Richard A. Andersen, earning his Ph.D. in 1997. At Berkeley, Holland synthesized cyclopentadienyl nickel complexes with amido, and alkoxo ligands. He then conducted postdoctoral studies as an NIH postdoctoral fellow with Prof. William Tolman at the University of Minnesota. In Tolman's group, Holland worked with coordination complexes of copper and O_{2}, and synthesized the first accurate synthetic models of type-1 copper sites in proteins.

== Independent career ==
Holland began his independent career in 2000 at the University of Rochester as an assistant professor. He was promoted to associate professor in 2005, and full professor in 2010. In 2013, Holland moved to Yale University, where he is currently a professor of chemistry. In 2021, he was awarded the title Conkey P. Whitehead Professor of Chemistry.

== Awards and memberships ==
Holland has been awarded multiple awards for his contributions to chemistry, including a Blavatnik Award for Young Scientists in 2013, a Friedrich Wilhelm Bessel Research Award of the Humboldt Foundation in 2016, a Fulbright Scholar Award in 2012, a Sloan Research Fellowship in 2003, and an NSF CAREER Award in 2002. He was elected a Fellow of the American Association for the Advancement of Science in 2015.

He has served on the Editorial Boards of Chemical Science and Chemical Society Reviews since 2019, and was previously on the Editorial Boards of Inorganic Chemistry (2012-2014) and the Journal of Biological Inorganic Chemistry (2009-2012).

== Personal life ==
Holland is a piano soloist and accompanist for choirs, vocalists, instrumentalists, and musicals in his spare time. He has also sung with choruses such as the San Francisco Symphony Chorus, and currently sings with the Yale Camerata.

Holland is married to Maggie Langford Holland, another Princeton graduate.
