= Beryllium borohydride =

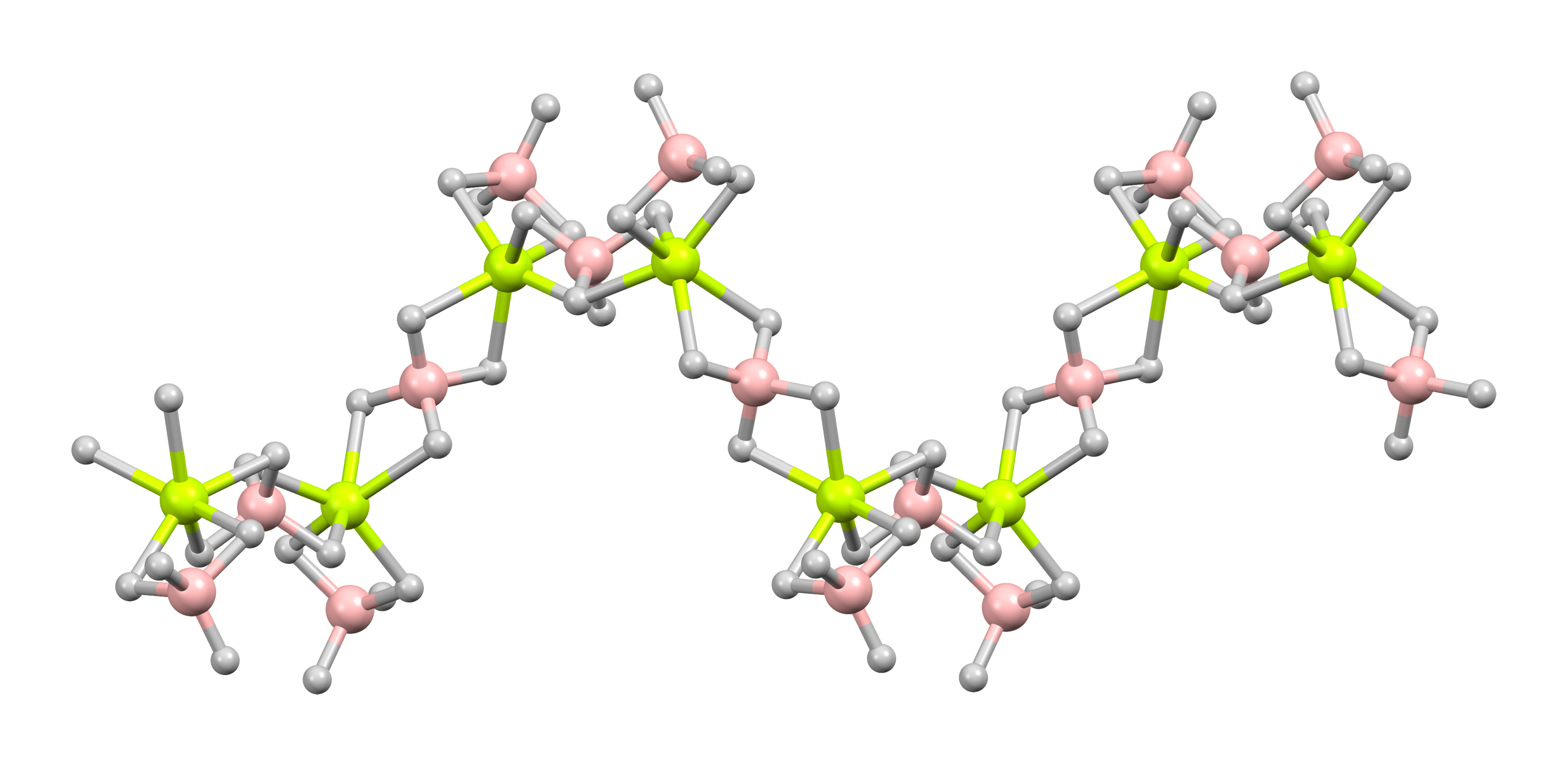

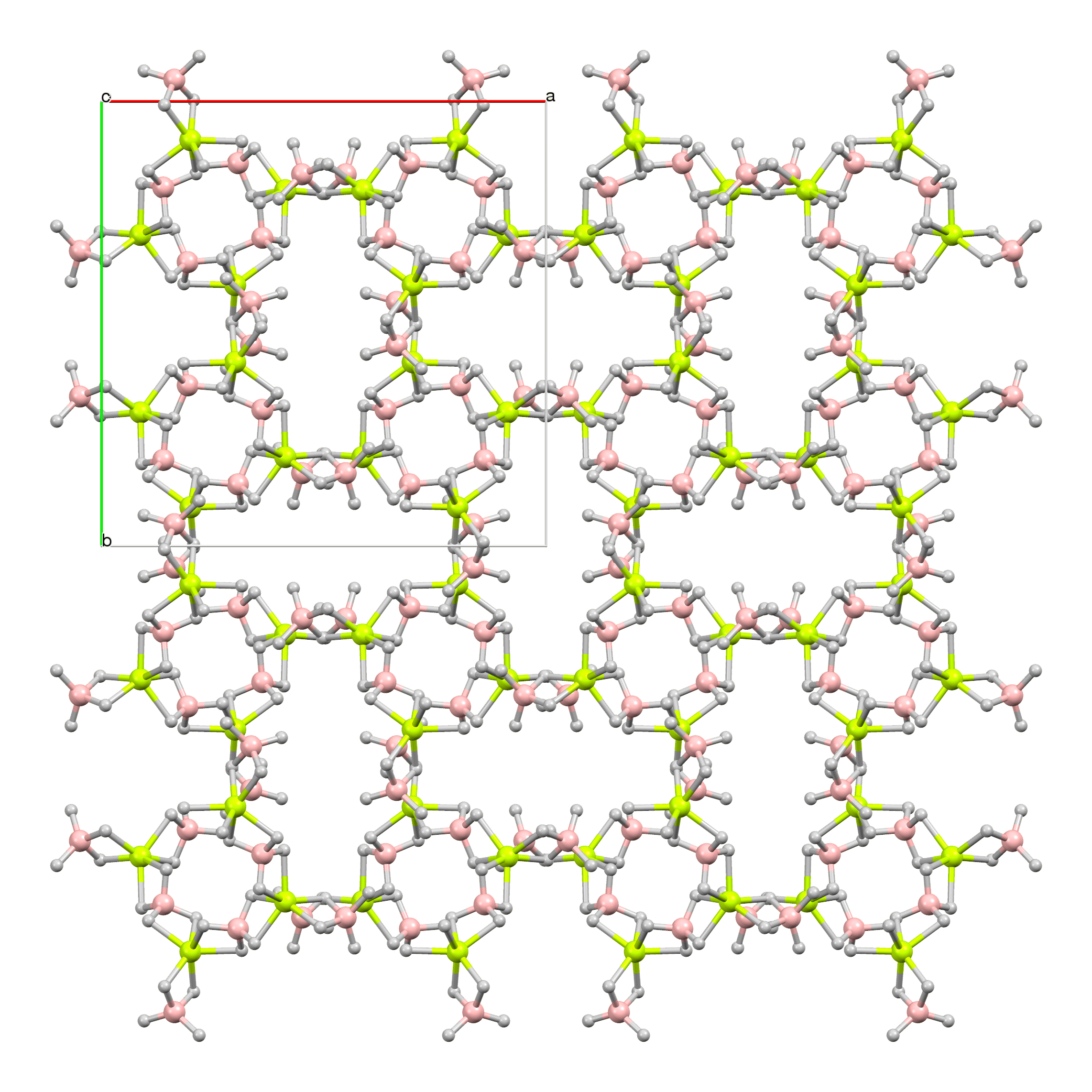
- Beryllium Boron Hydrogen

Names
- IUPAC name Beryllium borohydride
- Other names Beryllium tetrahydroborate(1−), Beryllium tetrahydroborate(III)

Identifiers
CAS Number	17440-85-6
3D model (JSmol)	Interactive image
ChemSpider	4809792
PubChem CID	6101896
UNII	4GV25JT031
CompTox Dashboard (EPA)	DTXSID101030508
- InChI: InChI=1S/2BH4.Be/h2*1H4;/q2*-1;+2 Key: ONQXRAXVSQRPSX-UHFFFAOYSA-N
- SMILES: [Be+2].[BH4-].[BH4-]

Properties
Chemical formula	Be[BH_{4}]_{2}
Molar mass	38.70 g·mol^{−1}
Appearance	white crystals
Density	0.604 g/cm^{3}
Melting point	91.3 °C (196.3 °F; 364.4 K)
Boiling point	123 °C (253 °F; 396 K) decomposes
Solubility in water	reacts
Solubility	soluble in benzene, diethyl ether

Structure
Crystal structure	tetragonal
Space group	I4_{1}cd, No. 110

Thermochemistry
Std enthalpy of formation (Δ_{f}H^{⦵}_{298})	−108 kJ/mol

Hazards
- NIOSH (US health exposure limits)
PEL (Permissible)	TWA 0.002 mg/m^{3} C 0.005 mg/m^{3} (30 minutes), with a maximum peak of 0.025 mg/m^{3} (as Be)
REL (Recommended)	Ca C 0.0005 mg/m^{3} (as Be)
IDLH (Immediate danger)	Ca [4 mg/m^{3} (as Be)]
- Except where otherwise noted, data are given for materials in their standard state (at 25 °C [77 °F], 100 kPa). Infobox references

Beryllium borohydride is an inorganic compound with the chemical formula Be[BH_{4}]_{2}.

== Preparation ==
Beryllium borohydride is formed by the reaction of beryllium hydride with diborane in an ether solution.

It can also be formed by the reaction of beryllium chloride and lithium borohydride in a sealed tube at 120 °C:

BeCl_{2} + 2 Li[BH_{4}] → Be[BH_{4}]_{2} + 2 LiCl

== Structure ==
The chemical formula of beryllium borohydride can be written as Be^{2+}([BH_{4}]^{−})_{2}. The crystal structure is made up of a helical polymer of BH_{4}Be and BH_{4} structure units. The borohydride ions, [BH_{4}]^{−}, adopt a tetrahedral geometry. Beryllium is 6-coordinate and adopts a distorted trigonal prismatic geometry.

== Application ==
The purest beryllium hydride is obtained by the reaction of triphenylphosphine, PPh_{3}, with beryllium borohydride, Be[BH_{4}]_{2} at 180 °C:

Be[BH_{4}]_{2} + 2 PPh_{3} → 2 Ph_{3}P^{+}−^{−}BH_{3} + BeH_{2}
