= Jaqueline Kiplinger =

American inorganic chemist

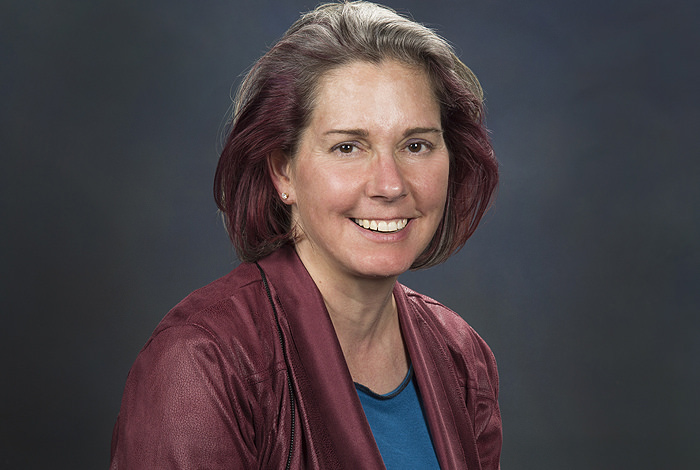
- Education: University of Colorado Colorado Springs; University of Utah
- Scientific career
- Workplaces: Los Alamos National Laboratory
- Thesis: Activation and Functionalization of Carbon-Fluorine Bonds by Transition Metal Complexes (1996)

Jaqueline Kiplinger is an American inorganic chemist who specializes in organometallic actinide chemistry. Over the course of her career, she has done extensive work with fluorocarbons and actinides. She is currently a Fellow of the Materials Synthesis and Integrated Devices group in the Materials Physics and Applications Division of Los Alamos National Laboratory (LANL). Her current research interests are focused on the development of chemistry for the United States' national defense and energy needs.

== Education ==
Kiplinger received her Bachelor of Science degree in chemistry from the University of Colorado Colorado Springs in 1990. Under the guidance of Professor Ruminiski, Kiplinger has published several papers reporting coordination chemistry of iron and ruthenium featuring multidentate pyrazine-based ligands.

Kiplinger did her graduate studies at the University of Utah working with Professor Thomas Richmond. Her work focused on using organometallic species to break carbon-fluorine bonds in perfluoroalkanes, which are usually unreactive due to fluorine’s high electronegativity and the strength of the carbon-fluorine bond. One notable publication in Organometallics displayed a novel transformation of an aromatic carbon-fluorine bond to a carbon-carbon bond using tungsten(II), shown below. Additionally, Kiplinger and Richmond reported zirconium complexes that catalyze aromatic fluorocarbon hydrogenolysis.

From 1996 to 1999, Kiplinger worked as a postdoctoral researcher at University of California, Berkeley under Professor Robert G. Bergman.

== Career ==
Following her postdoctoral work, Kiplinger was awarded the Frederick Reines Distinguished Postdoctoral Fellowship at Los Alamos National Laboratory. There, she started the program focused on the chemistry of actinides and lanthanides in the group led by Dr. Carol Burns. In 2002, Kiplinger, Burns, and co-workers published the first f-block elemental complex containing a ketimido group. This was the first of many papers the group published pertaining to organometallic uranium chemistry. Soon after, Kiplinger and coworkers reported the first actinide hydrazonato complex using U(IV). During that time, Kiplinger also reported improved synthesis of uranium-based metallocene complexes (C_{5}Me_{5})U(CH_{2}C_{6}H_{5})_{3}.

Kiplinger continued her research at LANL after the conclusion of her fellowship, and she serves as a laboratory Fellow in the chemistry division to this day. She continued developing lanthanide and actinide chemistry, and published the synthesis of the first uranium and thorium halide complexes with tert-butyl substituted ketiminate ligands in 2013.

In 2016, Kiplinger reported the synthesis of an infinite thorium diazide coordination polymer; the first such polymer involving an actinide. The infinite property is unique to thorium azide complexes compared to other actinide metallocenes, such as uranium, which polymerize into trimers. By making alterations on the classic cyclopentadiene groups, different coordination polymers can be formed. (C_{5}Me_{5})_{2}Th(N_{3})_{2} utilizes pentamethylcyclopentadiene to form polymers with two bridging azide groups, while (C_{5}Me_{4}Et)_{2}Th(μ-η^{1}:η^{1}-N_{3})(N_{3}) uses ethyl-tetramethylcyclopentadiene caps to create a polymer with one bridging azide and one terminal azide group. Her recent efforts have been focused on the chemistry of uranium and thorium compounds with nitrogen-rich ligands. For example, experimental and theoretical work from her group revealed that tetrazolate ligands of these complexes act as sigma donors.

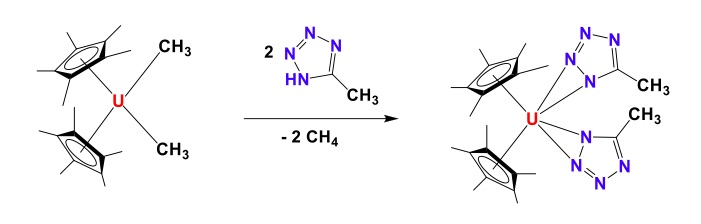

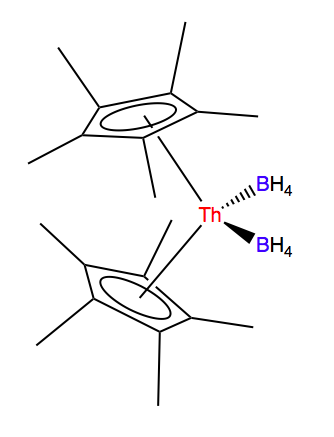
Thorium Metallocene Borohydride

Another important thrust in her research involved the development of redox chemistry with uranium hydrides. She showed that phenylsilane can be used as a convenient stoichiometric reagent producing well-defined uranium (III), uranium (IV), and uranium (VI) complexes. Her more recent work details a new route to uranium and thorium metallocene borohydrides. The uranium complex had been synthesized previously from tetravalent uranium pentamethylborohydride and potassium cyclopentadiene, but the new synthesis using calcium borohydride and pentamethylcyclopentadienyl uranium chloride resulted in a higher yield under milder conditions. While the preparation of U(BH_{4})_{4} is dated to the seminal work of Schlesinger and Brown in 1940s, this is the first example of a thorium metallocene borohydride.

== Awards ==
2018 Fellow of the American Chemical Society

2017 IUPAC International Distinguished Women in Chemistry Award

2016 University of Utah Distinguished Chemistry Alumna Award

2015 ACS F. Albert Cotton Award in Synthetic Inorganic Chemistry

2013-2014 Organometallic Subdivision Chair, ACS Division of Inorganic Chemistry

2012 R&D 100 Award for U-TURN: Turning Uranium Around Process

2012- Fellow of the Royal Society of Chemistry

2012- National Nuclear Security Administration Environmental Stewardship Award

2010- National Nuclear Security Administration Best-in-Class Pollution Prevention Award

1998 ACS Nobel Laureate Signature Award for the best Ph.D. thesis in the U.S.
