= Robert G. Bergman =

American chemist and academic

Robert George Bergman
- Education: University of Wisconsin-Madison, Ph.D. (1966); Carleton College B.S. (1963)
- Awards: Wolf Prize in Chemistry (2017)
- Scientific career
- Fields: Organic Chemistry, Organometallic Chemistry
- Thesis: Reactions of Methylnorbornyl Cations and Reactions of the 3-Nortricyclyl-3-carbinyl Cation (1966)
- Doctoral advisor: Jerome A. Berson
- Other academic advisors: Ronald Breslow
- Doctoral students: Suzanne Blum; Karen Goldberg; John F. Hartwig; Patrick L. Holland; Eric Jacobsen; Roy A. Periana
- Other notable students: Post-docs: Vy Maria Dong; Jaqueline Kiplinger; Julie Kovacs; Jennifer Schomaker; Neil E. Schore
- Website: rgbgrp.cchem.berkeley.edu

Robert George Bergman is an American chemist. He is Professor of the Graduate School and Gerald E. K. Branch Distinguished Professor Emeritus at the University of California, Berkeley.

== Early life and education ==
Born in Chicago, Robert Bergman was the son of Joseph J. and Stella Bergman, née Horowitz. In 1963 he graduated from Carleton College with a degree in chemistry. Under the supervision of Jerome A. Berson, he received a PhD in 1966 from the University of Wisconsin-Madison. From 1966 to 1967 he was a NATO postdoctoral fellow at Ronald Breslow's laboratory at Columbia University, New York City.

== Career ==
Bergman began his independent career at the California Institute of Technology in Pasadena where he was an Arthur Noyes Research Instructor (1967–1969), assistant professor (1969–1971), associate professor (1971–1973), and full professor (1973–1977). From 1977 to 2002, he was a chemistry professor at the University of California, Berkeley and since 1978 has also been a researcher at the Lawrence Berkeley National Laboratory. In 2002 he was appointed Gerald E. K. Branch Distinguished Professor of Chemistry. Bergman transitioned to Emeritus status in 2016 and now holds to the titles of Professor of the Graduate School and Gerald E. K. Branch Distinguished Professor Emeritus.

=== Research ===
Bergman works in the field of organic chemistry. He first investigated the reaction mechanisms of organic reactions at Caltech. He developed methods for the representation of very reactive molecules, for example 1,3-diradicals and vinyl cations. In 1972, he discovered the thermal cyclization of cis-1,5-hexadiyne-3-ene to 1,4-dehydrobenzene-diradicals, now known as the Bergman cyclization. This reaction later played a major role in understanding the mode of action of enediyne antitumor antibiotics. Since the mid-1970s, Bergman has also been working in the field of organometallic chemistry. He contributed to the synthesis and reaction of organometallic complexes and investigated organometallic compounds with metal-oxygen and metal-nitrogen bonds. He also discovered the first soluble organometallic complexes of the transition metals, to which the addition of a saturated hydrocarbon (C-H activation, C-H insertion) succeeded.

== Personal life ==
Since June 17, 1965, Bergman has been married. The Bergmans have two sons.

== Awards and honours ==
- 1969: Alfred P. Sloan Fellowship
- 1970: Teacher-Scholar Award (Camille and Henry Dreyfus Foundation)
- 1978: Student Government Award for Excellence in Teaching (California Institute of Technology)
- 1984: Sherman Fairchild Distinguished Scholar
- 1985: Distinguished Alumni Achievement Award (Carleton College)
- 1985: John Bailar Medal (University of Illinois)
- 1986: ACS Award in Organometallic Chemistry (American Chemical Society)
- 1987: Arthur C. Cope Scholar award (American Chemical Society)
- 1990: Edgar Fahs Smith Award (American Chemical Society)
- 1990: Ira Remsen Award (American Chemical Society)
- 1991: MERIT Award (National Institutes of Health)
- 1994: Ernest Orlando Lawrence Award (U.S. Department of Energy)
- 1995: Honorary PhD degree of Carleton College
- 1996: Arthur C. Cope Award (American Chemical Society)
- 1999: Chemical Pioneer Award (American Institute of Chemists)
- 2001: Edward Leete Award for Teaching and Research in Organic Chemistry (American Chemical Society)
- 2002: Teaching Award (UC Berkeley Department of Chemistry)
- 2003: James Flack Norris Award in Physical Organic Chemistry (American Chemical Society)
- 2003: Monie A. Ferst Award (Sigma Xi)
- 2004: Award for Excellence in Technology Transfer (Lawrence Berkeley National Laboratory)
- 2007: NAS Award in Chemical Sciences (National Academy of Sciences)
- 2013: George A. Olah Award in Hydrocarbon or Petroleum Chemistry
- 2014: Technion-Israel Institute of Technology Distinguished Schulich Lectureship Award
- 2014: Welch Award in Chemistry
- 2014: Royal Society of Chemistry Robert Robinson Award
- 2017: Wolf Prize in Chemistry

== Memberships ==
- 1963: Phi Beta Kappa
- 1964: Phi Lambda Upsilon
- 1966: Sigma Xi
- 1984: National Academy of Sciences
- 1984: American Academy of Arts and Sciences
- 1995: California Academy of Sciences
- 1999: American Association for the Advancement of Science

== Literature ==
- Who's Who in America. 2007, ISBN 0-8379-7006-7, p. 341.
