= John F. Hartwig =

American organometallic chemist (born 1964)

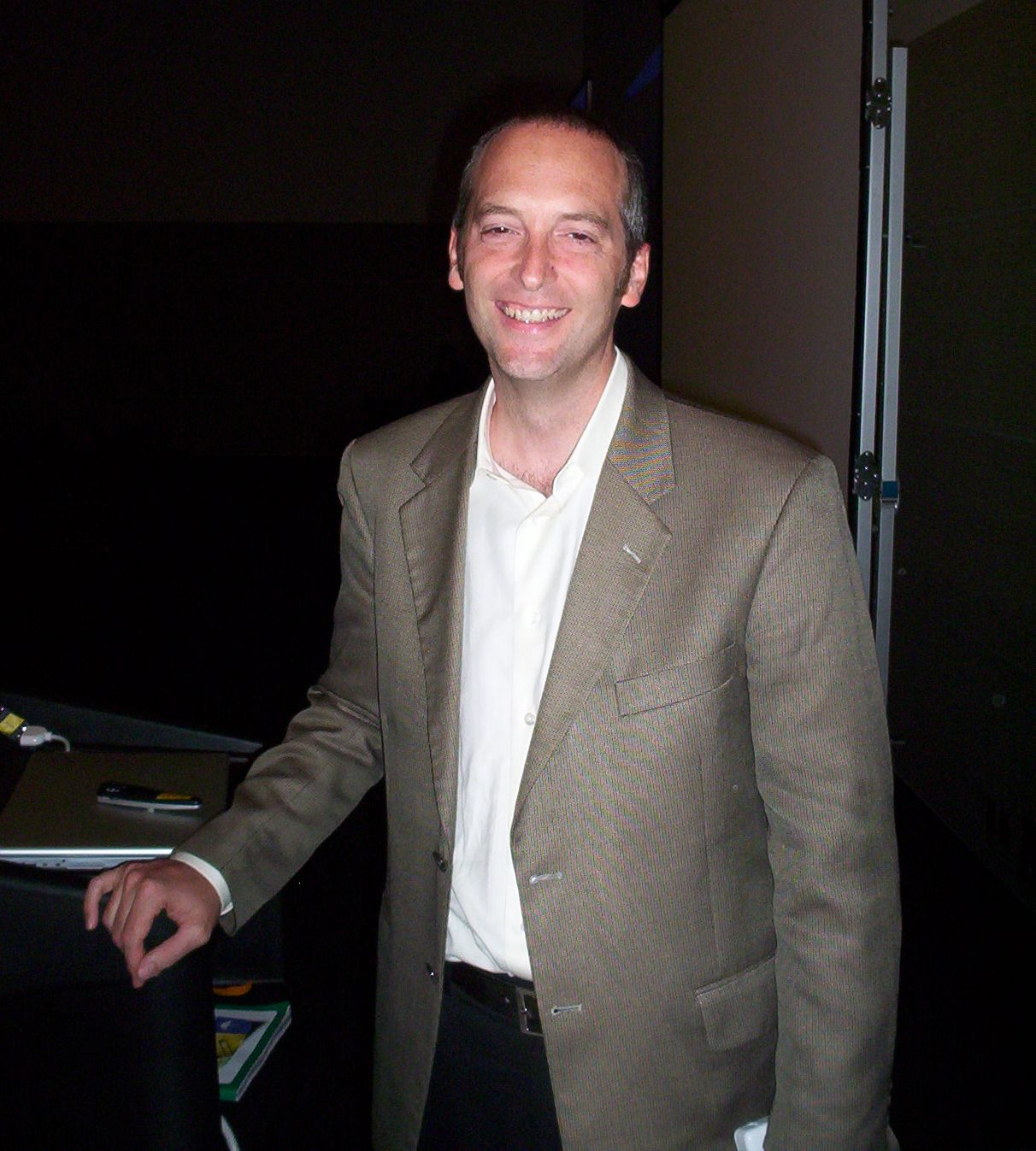
- Hartwig at the 2007 Boston ACS meeting
- Born: John F. Hartwig; 1964 (age 61–62); Elmhurst, Illinois
- Education: University of California, Berkeley Ph.D (1990); Princeton University A.B. (1986)
- Known for: Organometallic chemistry, Inorganic chemistry, Catalysis
- Awards: Willard Gibbs Award (2015); Wolf Prize in Chemistry (2019); Arthur C. Cope Award (2021)
- Scientific career
- Fields: Chemistry
- Workplaces: University of California, Berkeley
- Doctoral advisors: Robert G. Bergman and Richard A. Andersen
- Website: hartwig.cchem.berkeley.edu

John F. Hartwig is an American organometallic chemist who holds the position of Henry Rapoport Professor of Chemistry at the University of California, Berkeley. His laboratory traditionally focuses on developing transition metal-catalyzed reactions. Hartwig is known for helping develop the Buchwald–Hartwig amination, a chemical reaction used in organic chemistry for the synthesis of carbon–nitrogen bonds via the palladium-catalyzed cross-coupling of amines with aryl halides.

== Education and training ==
Hartwig received his A.B. from Princeton University in 1986. With Robert G. Bergman and Richard A. Andersen as coadvisors, he earned his Ph.D. from the University of California, Berkeley in 1990. Thereafter he was an American Cancer Society Postdoctoral Associate at MIT, where he worked in the laboratory of Stephen J. Lippard.

== Research ==
He assumed an independent position at Yale University in 1992. Over the next 14 years, he was promoted to associate professor, full professor and finally the Irénée duPont professorship. During this period, the Buchwald–Hartwig amination was developed. Here is an example of this reaction (OTf = triflate or trifluoromethanesulfonate):

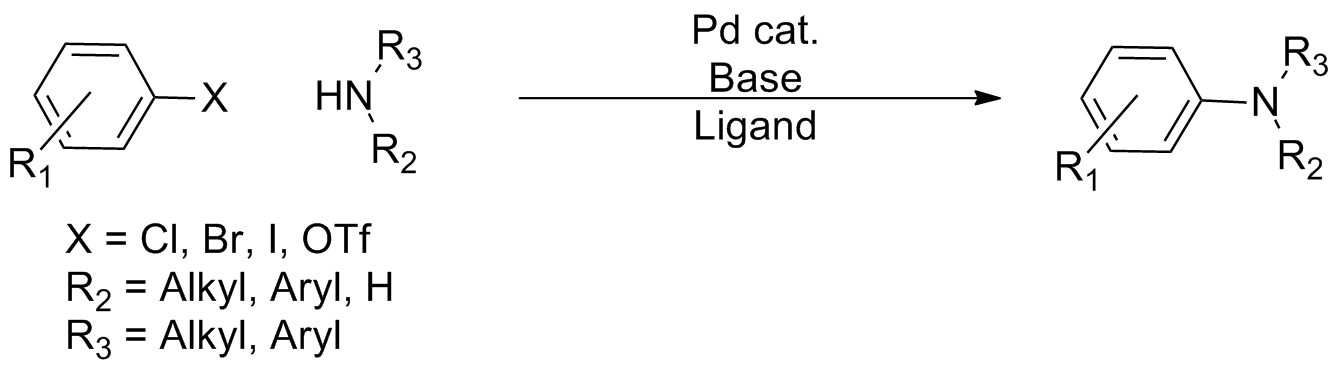
The Buchwald–Hartwig reaction

Also while at Yale, he discovered the metal-catalyzed borylation of unactivated C-H bonds.

Aliphatic C–H borylation

In 2006, he assumed the Kenneth L. Reinhart Jr. professorship at the University of Illinois at Urbana–Champaign. There he published "Organotransition Metal Chemistry: From Bonding to Catalysis." In 2011 he returned to Berkeley as Henry Rapoport Professor of Chemistry as well as a member of the Lawrence Berkeley National Laboratory. He was elected to the National Academy of Sciences in 2012. In 2019, together with Stephen Buchwald, he was awarded the Wolf Prize.

== Memberships, fellowships, and awards ==
2024	BBVA Foundation Frontiers of Knowledge Award
2022	Emanuel Merck Lectureship
2021	Arthur C. Cope Award
2020	Clarivate Citation Laureate
2019	Wolf Prize in Chemistry
2015	Member, American Academy of Arts and Sciences
2015	Willard Gibbs Award
2014	Janssen Pharmaceutical Prize
2013	Herbert C. Brown Award for Creative Research in Synthetic Methods
2012	Member, National Academy of Sciences
2010	GlaxoSmithKline Scholars Award
2009	Edward Mack Jr. Memorial Award, Ohio State University
2009	Mitsui Chemicals Catalysis Science Award, Japan
2009	Joseph Chatt Award of the Royal Society of Chemistry
2008	International Catalysis Award from the International Association of Catalysis Society
2008	Mukaiyama Award from the Society of Synthetic Organic Chemistry, Japan
2008	Paul N. Rylander Award of the Organic Reactions Catalysis Society
2007	Raymond and Beverly Sackler Prize in the Physical Sciences
2007	Tetrahedron Young Investigator Award in Organic Synthesis
2006	ACS Award in Organometallic Chemistry
2005	Fellow of the American Association for the Advancement of Science
2004	Thieme-IUPAC Prize in Synthetic Organic Chemistry
2003	Leo Hendrik Baekeland Award
1998	Arthur C. Cope Scholar Award
1997	Camille Dreyfus Teacher-Scholar Award
1992	Dreyfus Foundation New Faculty Award
