= Guillermo Bazan =

American chemist, material scientist, and academic

Guillermo Carlos Bazan
- Born: Mendoza, Argentina
- Education: California Institute of Technology; Massachusetts Institute of Technology
- Known for: Organic semiconductors Polyolefin Synthesis; Bioelectronics
- Scientific career
- Fields: Materials, Chemistry & Biochemistry
- Workplaces: University of Rochester; University of California, Santa Barbara
- Doctoral advisor: Richard Schrock

Guillermo Carlos Bazan is an American-Argentine chemist, material scientist, and academic.

Bazan earned a B.Sc with Honors in chemistry from the University of Ottawa in 1986, and a Ph.D in Inorganic Chemistry from Massachusetts Institute of Technology in 1991. From 1992 to 1998 he was on the faculty of the University of Rochester. In 1998 he was appointed as a professor in the Chemistry & Biochemistry Department and the Materials Department at the University of California, Santa Barbara. In January 2020, he took a position at the National University of Singapore, joining the faculty of the Institute for Functional Intelligent Materials initiated by Professor Konstantin Novoselov. In March 2024, he became director of IDMxS, a research centre of excellence at Nanyang Technological University, becoming a professor at the School of Chemistry, Chemical Engineering & Biotechnology (CCEB).

Bazan has over 670 publications, an h-index of 120, and his work has been recognized by the Arthur C. Cope Scholar Award of the American Chemical Society (2007) and the Bessel Award of the Humboldt Foundation. He is a fellow of the American Association for the Advancement of Science.

== Publications and Patents ==
- Synthesis, Morphology and Optical Properties of Tetrahedral Oligo(phenylenevinylene) Materials, Wang, S.; Oldham, W.J.; Hudack, R.A.; Bazan, G.C., J. Am. Chem. Soc., 2000, 122, 5695-5709.
- DNA Detection using Water-Soluble Conjugated Polymers and Peptide Nucleic Acid Probes, Gaylord, B.S.; Heeger, A.J.; Bazan, G.C., Proc. Natl. Acad. Sci. USA, 2002, 99, 10954-10957.
- Fluorescein Provides a Resonance Gate for FRET from Conjugated Polymers to DNA Intercalated Dyes, Wang, S.; Gaylord, B.S.; Bazan, G.C., J. Am. Chem. Soc., 2004, 126, 5446-5451.
- Methods and compositions for detection and analysis of polynucleotides using light harvesting multichromophores, US Patent 7,214,489, May 8, 2007.
- Novel Organic Materials through Control of Multichromophore Interactions, Bazan, G.C., J. Org. Chem., 2007, 72, 8615-8635.
- "Plastic" Solar Cells: Self-Assembly of Bulk Heterojunction Nanomaterials by Spontaneous Phase Separation, Peet, J.; Heeger, A.J.; Bazan, G.C., Acc. Chem. Res., 2009, 42, 1700–1708.
- Streamlined Microwave-Assisted Preparation of Narrow-Bandgap Conjugated Polymers for High-Performance Bulk Heterojunction Solar Cells, Coffin, R.C.; Peet, J.; Rogers, J.; Bazan, G.C., Nature Chemistry, 2009, 1, 657-661.
- Chemically Fixed p-n Heterojunctions for Polymer Electronics by means of Covalent B-F Bond Formation, Hoven, C.V.; Wang, H.P.; Elbing, M.; Garner, L.E.; Winkelhaus, D.; Bazan, G.C., Nature Materials, 2010, 9, 249-252.
- Electrochemical Considerations for Determining Absolute Frontier Orbital Energy Levels of Conjugated Polymers for Solar Cell Applications, Cardona, C.M; Li, W.; Kaifer, A.E.; Stockdale, D.; Bazan, G.C., Adv. Mater., 2011, 23, 2367-2371.
- Non-Basic High-Performance Molecules for Solution-Processed Organic Solar Cells, van der Poll, T.S.; Love, J.A.; Nguyen, T.Q.; Bazan, G.C., Adv. Mater., 2012, 24, 3646-3649.
- Design Strategies for Organic Semiconductors Beyond the Molecular Formula; Henson, Z.B.; Mullen, K.; Bazan, G.C., Nature Chemistry., 2012, 4, 699-704.
- Design and Synthesis of Molecular Donors for Solution-Processed High-Efficiency Organic Solar Cells, Coughlin, J.E.; Henson, Z.B.; Welch, G.C.; Bazan, G.C., Acc. Chem. Res., 2014, 47, 257-270.

== Awards and Recognitions ==
- Fellow of the Royal Society of Chemistry, 2014
- Top 50 Material Scientists by Citation and Impact, Thomson Reuters, 2011
- Professor of the Chang Jiang Scholars Professor, 2009
- Advanced Materials Editorial Advisory Board, 2008
- Fellow of the American Association for the Advancement of Science, 2007
- American Chemical Society Cope Scholar Award, 2007
- Bessel Award, Humboldt Foundation, 2005
- National Science Foundation Special Creativity Award, 2003
- Union Carbide Innovation Award, 1999
- Union Carbide Innovation Award, 1998
- Closs Lecturer, University of Chicago, 1997
- Camille and Henry Dreyfus Foundation Teacher-Scholar Award, 1996-1998
- Sloan Research Fellow Award, 1996-1998
- National Science Foundation CAREER Award, 1995-1998
- Camille and Henry Dreyfus Foundation New Faculty Award, 1992-1993
- Natural Sciences and Engineering Research Council of Canada Postdoctoral Fellowship, November 1990-May 1992
- Natural Sciences and Engineering Research Council of Canada 1967 Science and Engineering Scholarship, September 1986-June 1990

== See also ==
- Alan J. Heeger
