= Jennifer Schomaker =

American chemist

- Born: Michigan
- Education: Michigan State University; Central Michigan University; Saginaw Valley State University
- Scientific career
- Workplaces: University of Wisconsin–Madison; University of California, Berkeley
- Thesis: Oxidative lactonization and its application to the total synthesis of (+)-tanikolide, the ylide-mediated homologative ring expansion of epoxides and aziridines in the synthesis of heterocycles and the total syntheses of haterumalide NA and haterumalide NC via a chromium-mediated coupling reaction (2006)

Jennifer Schomaker is an American chemist who is a professor at the University of Wisconsin–Madison. Her research considers the total synthesis of natural and unnatural products. She was selected as an American Chemical Society Arthur C. Cope Scholar Awardee in 2021.

== Early life and education ==
Schomaker grew up in Michigan. She was an undergraduate student in chemistry at Saginaw Valley State University. During her studies she worked at the Dow Chemical Company, where she developed biocatalytic methods. She moved to Central Michigan University, where she completed a master's degree under the supervision of Thomas Delia. Her master's research involved the synthesis of aniline derivatives of trihalopyrimidines. She completed her master's research whilst raising two young daughters. After graduating, Schomaker moved to Michigan State University, where she joined the research group of Babak Borhan. For her doctorate she studied the synthesis of (+)-tanikolide and haterumalide NA.

== Research and career ==
Schomaker moved to the University of California, Berkeley as a postdoctoral researcher with Robert G. Bergman. Her postdoctoral research identified new modes of reactivity in cobalt dinitrosoalkane complexes.

In 2009, Schomaker joined the faculty at the University of Wisconsin–Madison. Her initial research involved densely functionalized, stereochemically complex amine-containing natural products. At UW–Madison, Schomaker focused on the synthesis of natural and unnatural products, as well as the design of catalysts for tunable, chemo-, regio-, and enantioselective C-H amination reactions.

== Awards and honors ==
- 2013 Sloan Research Fellow
- 2013 National Science Foundation CAREER Award
- 2013 Michigan State University Distinguished Alumni Lecturer
- 2013 Journal of Physical Organic Chemistry Early Excellence Profile
- 2014 American Chemical Society Women's Chemists Committee Rising Star Award
- 2015 Michigan State University Recent Alumni Award
- 2016 Kavli Fellow
- 2019 University of California, Berkeley Somojai Miller Visiting Professor
- 2021 Arthur C. Cope Scholar Award

== Selected publications ==
- Schomaker JM; Delia TJ (1 October 2001). "Arylation of halogenated pyrimidines via a Suzuki coupling reaction". The Journal of Organic Chemistry. 66 (21): 7125–7128. doi:10.1021/jo010573+. ISSN 0022-3263. PMID 11597240. Wikidata Q43763943.
- Jared W. Rigoli; Cale D. Weatherly; Juliet M. Alderson; Brian T. Vo; Jennifer M Schomaker (11 November 2013). "Tunable, chemoselective amination via silver catalysis". Journal of the American Chemical Society. 135 (46): 17238–17241. doi:10.1021/ja406654y. ISSN 0002-7863. PMC 4492479. PMID 24187997. Wikidata Q41370449.
- Juliet M. Alderson; Alicia M. Phelps; Ryan J. Scamp; Nicholas S. Dolan; Jennifer M Schomaker (19 November 2014). "Ligand-controlled, tunable silver-catalyzed C-H amination". Journal of the American Chemical Society. 136 (48): 16720–16723. doi:10.1021/ja5094309. ISSN 0002-7863. PMC 4277762. PMID 25386769. Wikidata Q43082425.
