= Suzanne Blum =

American organometallic chemistry professor

Suzanne A. Blum
- Education: University of California, Berkeley, Ph.D. University of Michigan B.S.
- Scientific career
- Fields: Organic chemistry Organometallic chemistry Catalysis Mechanistic chemistry Fluorescence microscopy
- Doctoral advisor: Robert G. Bergman
- Other academic advisors: Christopher T. Walsh; Edwin Vedejs
- Website: https://blumgroupuci.squarespace.com

Suzanne A. Blum is an American professor of chemistry at the University of California, Irvine. Blum works on mechanistic chemistry, most recently focusing on borylation reactions and the development of single-molecule and single-particle fluorescence microscopy to study organic chemistry and catalysis. She received the American Chemical Society's Arthur C. Cope Scholar Award in 2023.

== Education ==
Blum studied chemistry as an undergraduate at the University of Michigan. She participated in multiple teaching and research projects, winning outstanding American Chemical Society student chapter, the UM Alumni Leadership award, and a National Science Foundation fellowship to attend graduate school at the University of California, Berkeley, where she earned a PhD working with Robert G. Bergman. Blum published multiple first-author papers and received teaching awards throughout her tenure at the University of California, Berkeley. She completed a postdoctoral fellowship at Harvard Medical School in 2006.

== Research ==
Prof. Blum began her independent research career in 2006 at the University of California, Irvine (UCI). Blum’s research focuses on the development and mechanistic study of reactions in organic, organometallic, catalytic, and materials chemistry, and on monitoring reaction intermediates by a combination of traditional spectroscopy and fluorescence microscopy methods. While many of her initial independent research publications were based on activated complexes of gold or palladium catalysts, she has more recently focused on borylation reactions to make advanced oxygen-, nitrogen-, or sulfur-containing heterocycles, amenable to pharmaceutical and agricultural derivation. Since starting her independent career, Blum developed single-molecule and single-particle techniques, often borrowed from biological or physical contexts, to study chemical processes, including to observe intermediates in "classical" reactions. Blum was elected Fellow of the American Association for the Advancement of Science (AAAS) in 2017 for distinguished contributions to molecular chemistry, particularly for the development of synthetic methods and of fluorescence microscopy tools to study chemical processes.

== Awards ==
- 2023: Arthur C. Cope Scholar Award (American Chemical Society)
- 2018: University of California, Irvine Physical Science Outstanding Contributions to the Undergraduate Education
- 2017: Fellow of the AAAS
- 2013-2016: Humboldt Fellowship
- 2013: Japan Society for the Promotion of Science Fellowship
- 2008: NSF CAREER Award
- 2005-2006: National Institutes of Health Postdoctoral Fellow
