= Alan Davison =

British chemist

- Born: 24 March 1936
- Died: 14 November 2015 (aged 79)
- Education: Swansea University (BSc); Imperial College London (PhD)
- Awards: Fellow of the Royal Society
- Scientific career
- Workplaces: Massachusetts Institute of Technology
- Thesis: Studies on the chemistry of transition metal carbonyls (1962)
- Doctoral advisor: Geoffrey Wilkinson

Alan Davison FRS (24 March 1936 — 14 November 2015) was a British inorganic chemist known for his work on transition metals, and a professor at Massachusetts Institute of Technology.

== Education ==
He earned a B.Sc. from Swansea University in 1959, and Ph.D. from Imperial College London in 1962, supervised by Nobel Laureate Sir Geoffrey Wilkinson.

== Career and research ==
Davison discovered the radioactive heart imaging agent Cardiolite, Technetium (99mTc) sestamibi.

=== Awards and honours ===
He was recipient of the following:

- Alfred P. Sloan Foundation Fellow (1967)
- Paul C. Aebersold Award for Outstanding Achievement in Basic Science Applied to Nuclear Medicine (1993)
- Ernest H. Swift Lectureship at the California Institute of Technology (1999)
- Fellow of the Royal Society of London (2000)
- American Chemical Society Award for Creative Invention (2006)
- Gabbay Award (2006)
- Carothers Award for outstanding contributions and advances in industrial applications of Chemistry (2006)
- George Charles de Hevesy Nuclear Pioneer Award (2009)

== Personal life ==
Davison died after a long illness on 14 November 2015 at the age of 79.

== In popular culture ==
In an episode of Friday Night Dinner, family patriarch and chemistry enthusiast Martin Goodman mishears the name "Alison" as "Alan Davison".
