= John A. Osborn =

English inorganic chemist

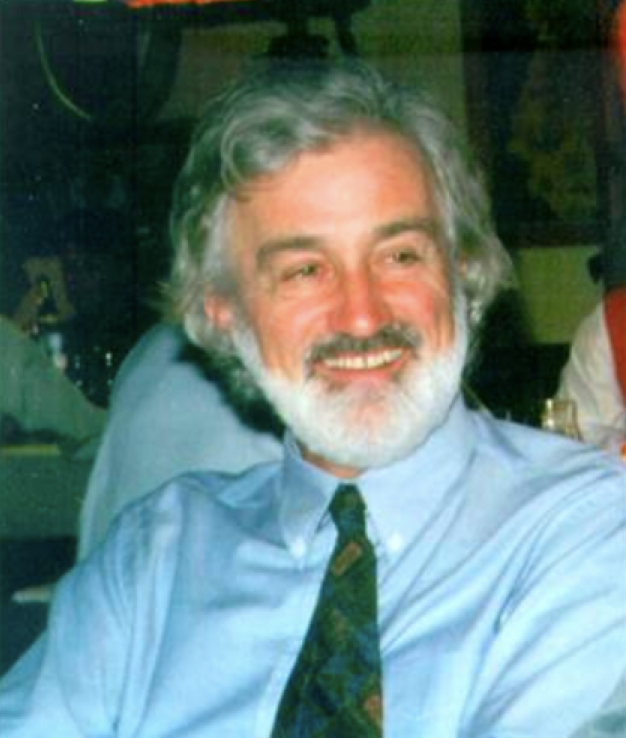
John Osborn

John A. Osborn (1939–2000) was an inorganic chemist who made contributions to organometallic chemistry. During that degree Osborn contributed to the development of Wilkinson's catalyst.

== Education ==
He studied at Cambridge University, receiving a bachelor's degree with honors. In 1962, he obtained a PhD from Imperial College London under the supervision of Sir Geoffrey Wilkinson (Nobel Prize in Chemistry, 1973). During this period, he contributed to the development of Wilkinson's catalyst RhCl(PPh_{3})_{3}. His thesis studies ranged widely.

== Career ==
Osborn's first independent position was at Harvard. His first doctoral student was Richard R. Schrock (Nobel Prize in Chemistry 2005), followed by John R. Shapley and Jay A. Labinger. During this time, the chemistry of [M(diene)(PR_{3})_{2}]^{+} was advanced (M = Rh, Ir), laying the foundation for many subsequent developments. With Schrock, he developed the Schrock-Osborn catalyst [(PR_{3})_{2}RhS_{2}]+ (S = solvent), which is a cationic species derived from the Wilkinson catalyst.

At Harvard, he taught organometallic chemistry and homogeneous catalysis with transition metals, inspiring many students to pursue careers in this field, including Ryōji Noyori (Nobel Prize in Chemistry 2001), who was a postdoctoral student at Harvard at the same time. He met Jean-Marie Lehn (Nobel Prize in Chemistry 1987), who was a visiting professor at Harvard in 1972 and then in 1974, and who invited him to join the Louis Pasteur University of Strasbourg in 1975.

In Strasbourg, he became a university professor and headed a CNRS-university research laboratory until his untimely death. During this period, he developed:

- tungsten(VI)-based olefin metathesis catalysts, known to be extremely active;

- catalytic systems for carbonylation reactions (palladium-based) and hydrosilylation reactions (platinum-based);

- the asymmetric synthesis of amines by hydrogenation.

- the catalytic properties of oxo (M=O) and imido (M=NR) complexes leading to new rhenium(VII) molecular catalysts for the rearrangement of allylic alcohols.
