= Transition metal alkyl complexes =

Coordination complex

Vitamin B12 is a naturally occurring metal-alkyl complex.

Transition metal alkyl complexes are coordination complexes that contain a bond between a transition metal and an alkyl ligand. Such complexes are pervasive and of practical and theoretical interest.

== Scope ==
Most metal alkyl complexes contain other, non-alkyl ligands. Great interest, mainly theoretical, has focused on the homoleptic complexes. Indeed, the first reported example of a complex containing a metal-sp^{3} carbon bond was the homoleptic complex diethylzinc. Other examples include hexamethyltungsten, tetramethyltitanium, and tetranorbornylcobalt.

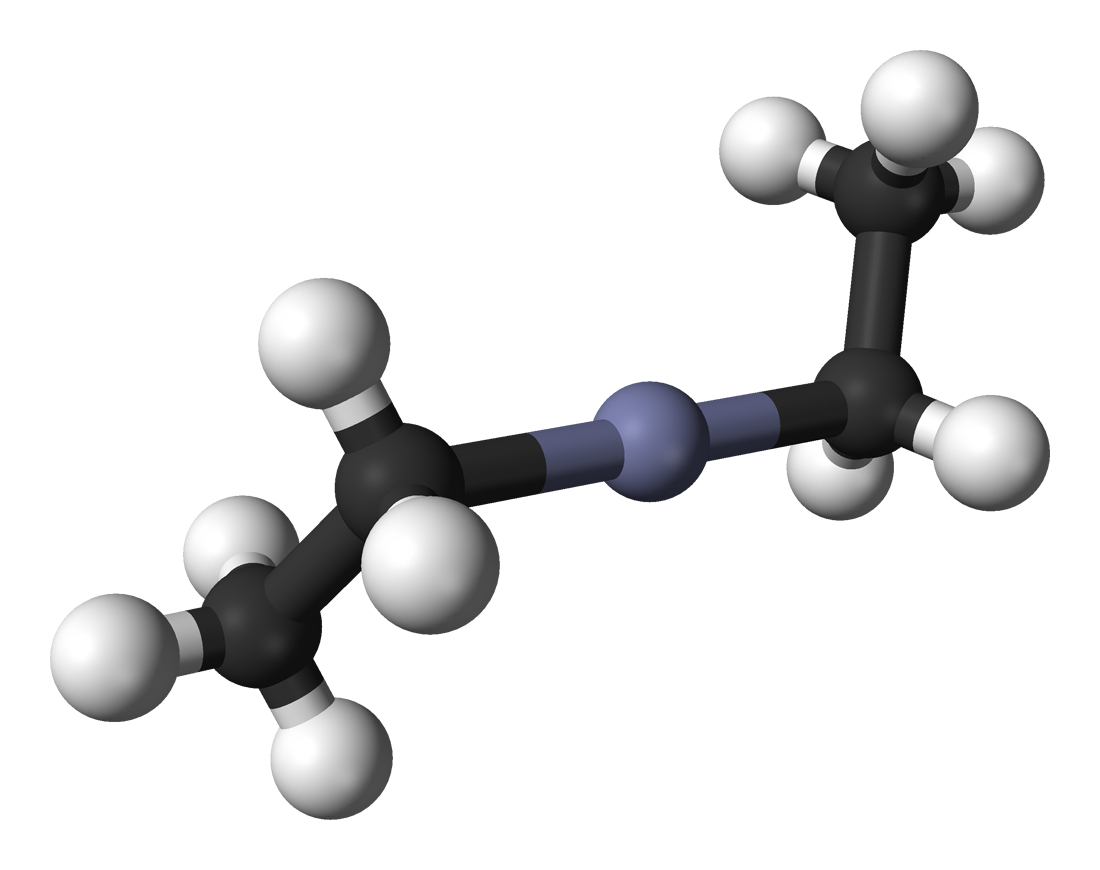
Structure of diethylzinc. The Zn-C bonds measure 194.8(5) pm, while the C-Zn-C angle is slightly bent with 176.2(4)°.

Mixed ligand, or heteroleptic, complexes containing alkyls are numerous. In nature, vitamin B12 and its many derivatives contain reactive Co-alkyl bonds.

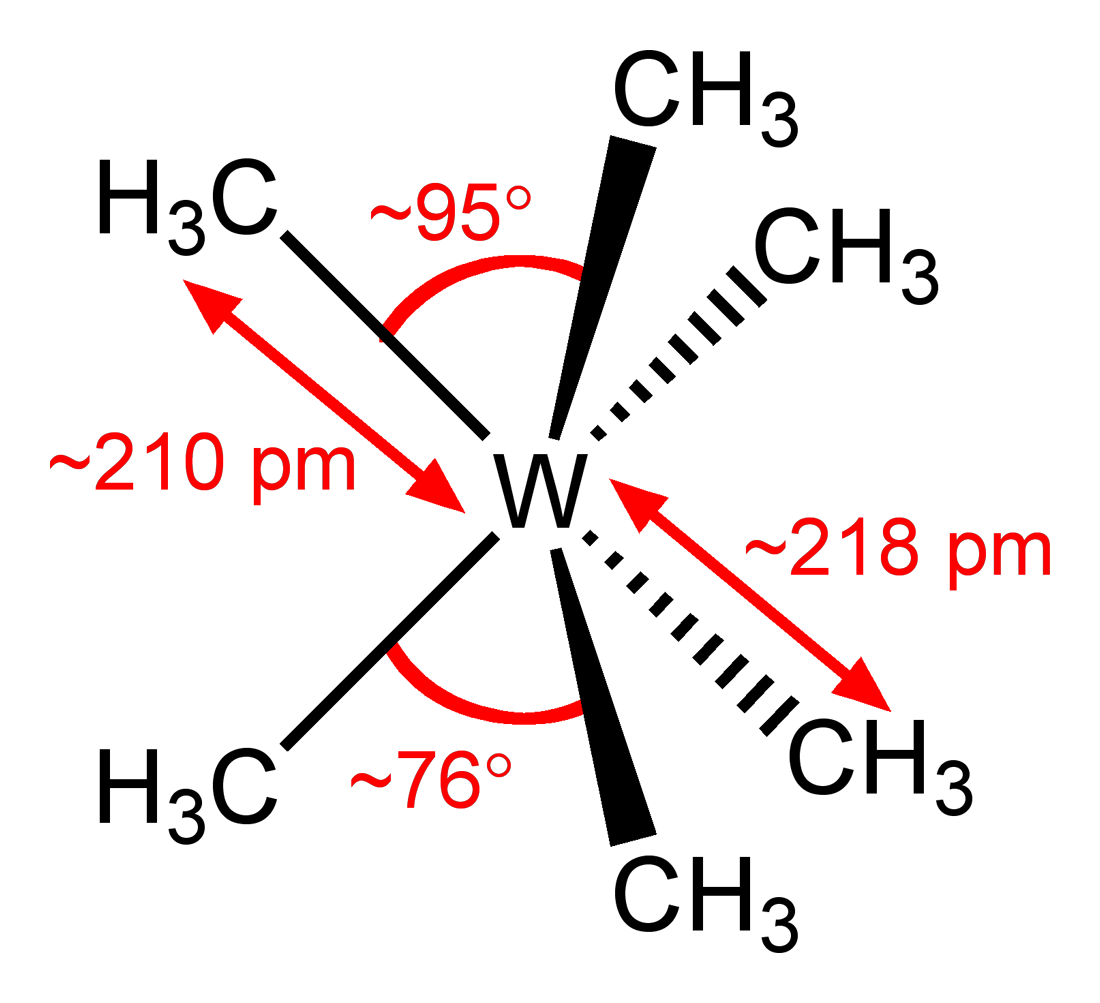
Hexamethyltungsten is an example of a "homoleptic" (all ligands being the same) metal alkyl complex.

Homoleptic metal alkyl complexes
example	comment
Ti(CH_{3})_{4}	only observed as monoetherate, d^{0}
[Ti(CH_{3})_{5}]^{−}	trigonal bipyramidal, d^{0}
[Ti_{2}(CH_{3})_{9}]^{−}	one bridging methyl ligand, d^{0},d^{0}
[Zr(CH_{3})_{6}]^{−}	trigonal prismatic, d^{0}
[Hf(CH_{3})_{6}]^{−}	trigonal prismatic, d^{0}
[Nb(CH_{3})_{6}]^{−}	d^{0}
[Ta(CH_{3})_{6}]^{−}	d^{0}
Mo(CH_{3})_{5}	d^{1}
W(CH_{3})_{6}	trigonal prismatic, d^{0}
[Mn(CH_{3})_{4}]^{2-}	d^{5}
[Mn(CH_{3})_{6}]^{2-}	d^{3}
[Re(CH_{3})_{6}]	d^{1}
[Fe(CH_{3})_{4}]^{−}	low-spin, d^{5}, square planar
[Co(CH_{3})_{4}]^{−}	square planar, d^{6}
[Rh(CH_{3})_{6}]^{3-}	d^{6}
[Ir(CH_{3})_{6}]^{3-}	d^{6}
[Ni(CH_{3})_{4}]^{2-}	d^{8}
[Pt(CH_{3})_{4}]^{2-}	d^{8}
[Au(CH_{3})_{2}]^{−}	d^{10}
[Au(CH_{3})_{4}]^{−}	d^{8}
Zn(CH_{3})_{2}	d^{10}
Cd(CH_{3})_{2}	d^{10}
Hg(CH_{3})_{2}	d^{10}

== Preparation ==
Metal alkyl complexes are prepared generally by two pathways: use of alkyl nucleophiles and use of alkyl electrophiles. Nucleophilic sources of alkyl ligands include Grignard reagents and organolithium compounds. Since many strong nucleophiles are also potent reductants, mildly nucleophilic alkylating agents are sometimes employed to avoid redox reactions. Organozinc compounds and organoaluminium compounds are such milder reagents.

Electrophilic alkylation commonly starts with low valence metal complexes. Typical electrophilic reagents are alkyl halides. Illustrative is the preparation of the methyl derivative of cyclopentadienyliron dicarbonyl anion:

CpFe(CO)_{2}Na + CH_{3}I → CpFe(CO)_{2}CH_{3} + NaI

Many metal alkyls are prepared by oxidative addition:

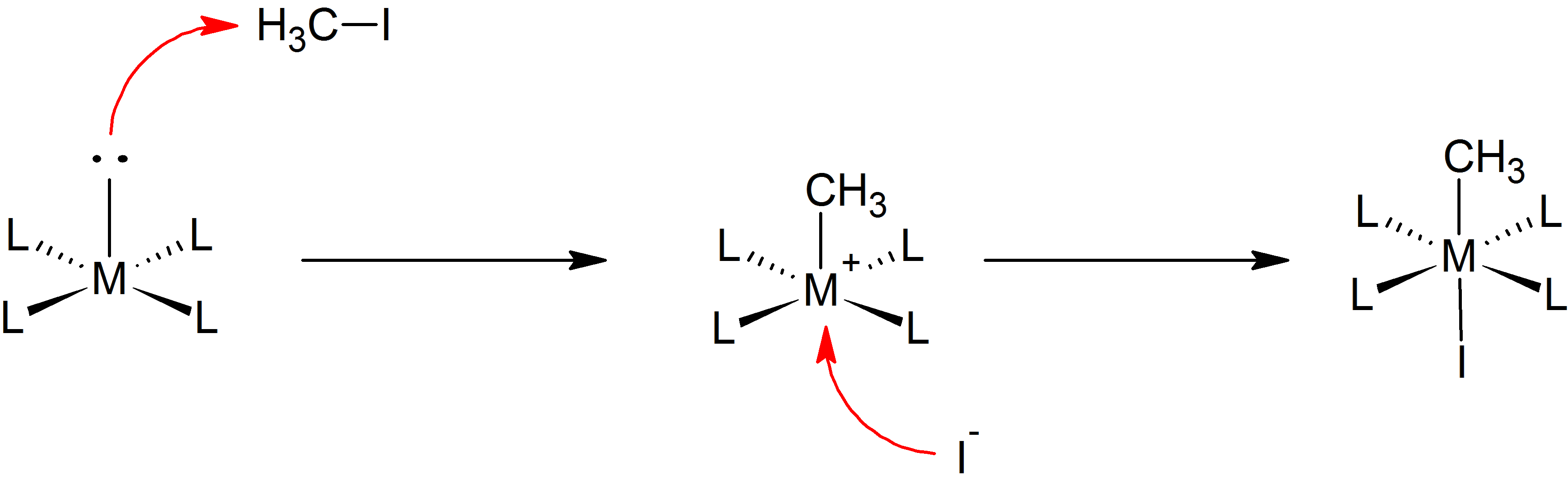

An example is the reaction of a Vaska's complex with methyl iodide.

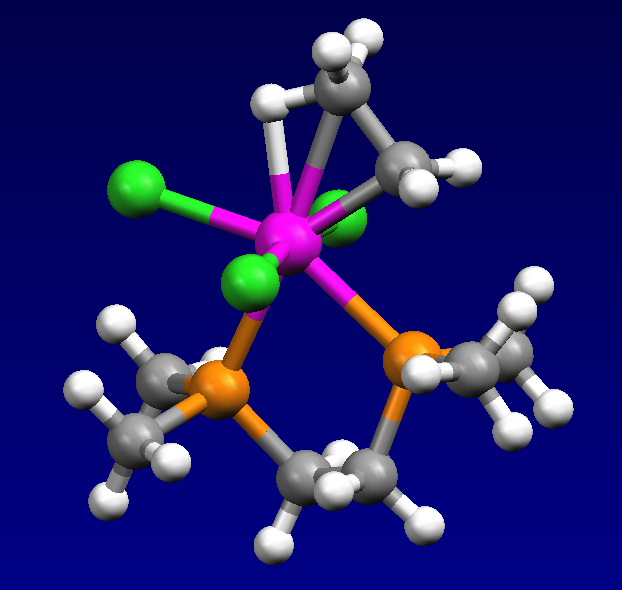
Structure of the alkyl complex (C_{2}H_{5})TiCl_{3}(dmpe), highlighting an agostic interaction between the methyl group and the Ti(IV) center.

== Agostic interactions and beta-hydride elimination ==
Some metal alkyls feature agostic interactions between a C-H bond on the alkyl group and the metal. Such interactions are especially common for complexes of early transition metals in their highest oxidation states.

One determinant of the kinetic stability of metal-alkyl complexes is the presence of hydrogen at the position beta to the metal. If such hydrogens are present and if the metal center is coordinatively unsaturated, then the complex can undergo beta-hydride elimination to form a metal-alkene complex:

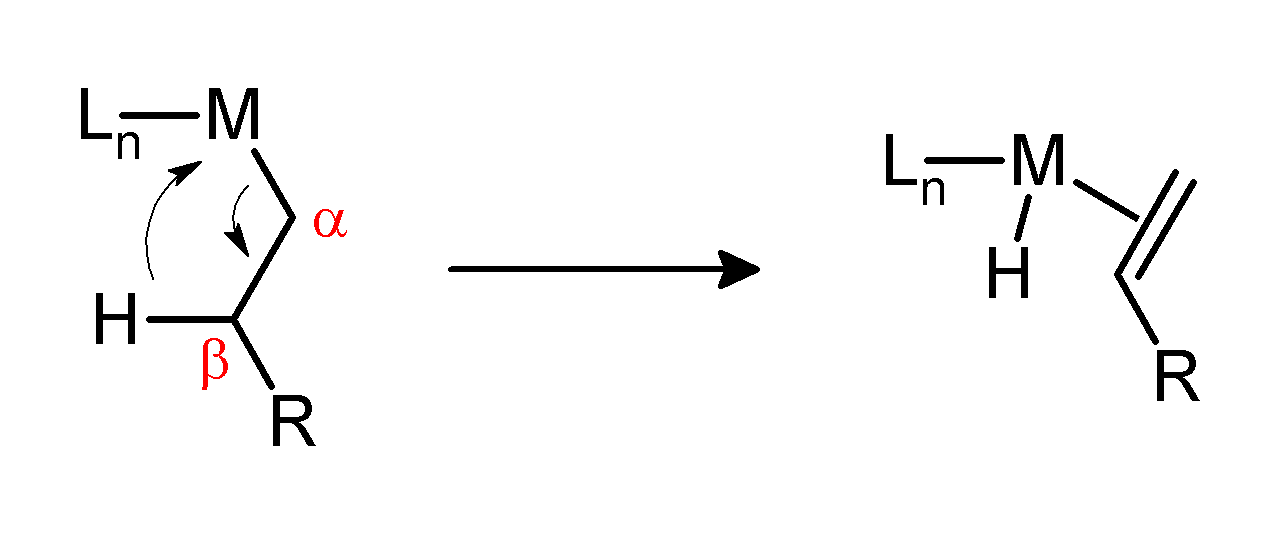

These conversions are assumed to proceed via the intermediacy of agostic interactions.

== Catalysis ==
Many homogeneous catalysts operate via the intermediacy of metal alkyls. These reactions include hydrogenation, hydroformylation, alkene isomerization, and olefin polymerization. It is assumed that the corresponding heterogeneous reactions also involve metal-alkyl bonds.
