= Richard R. Schrock =

American chemist and Nobel laureate (born 1945)

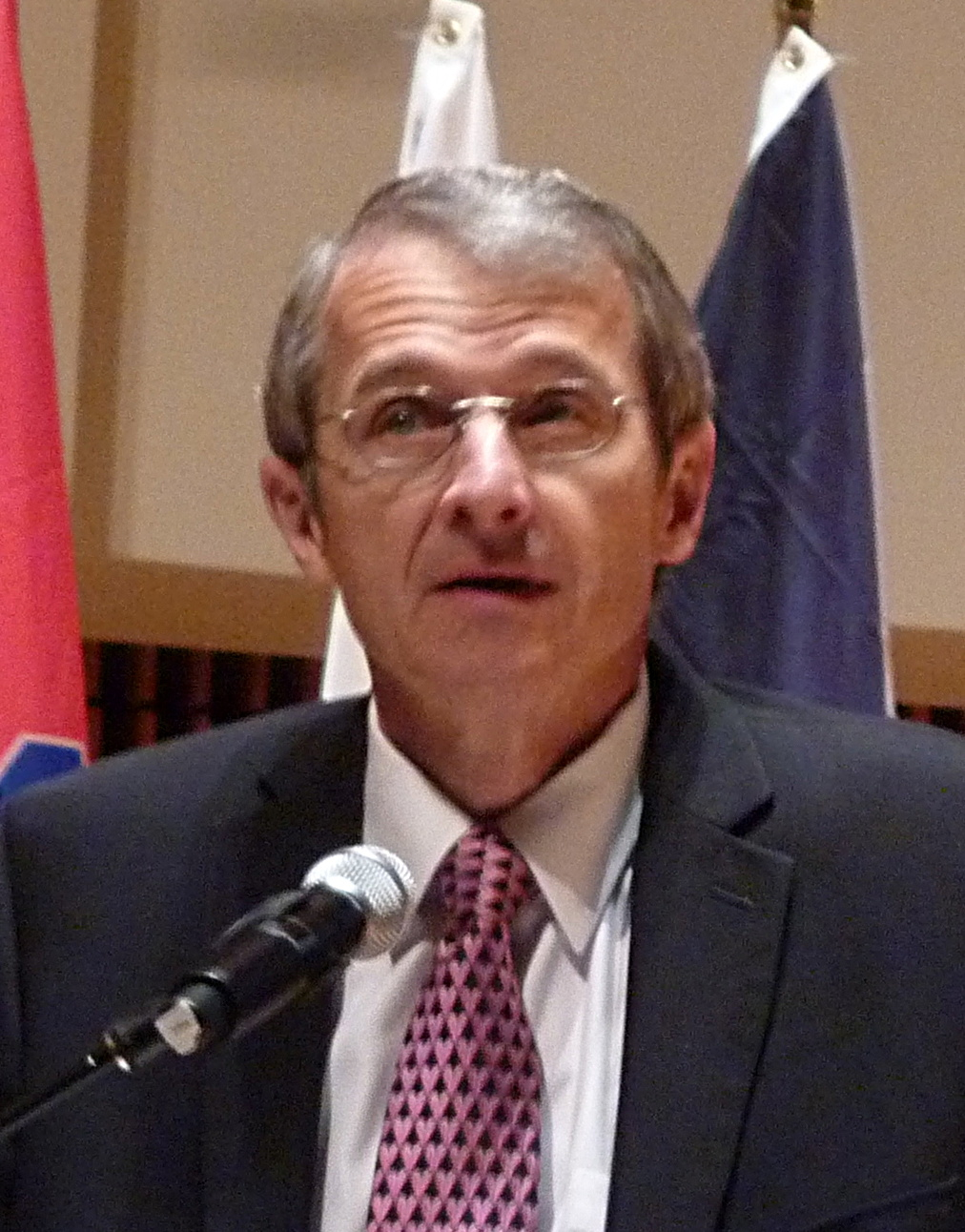
- Richard Schrock during the Opening Ceremony of 44th International Chemistry Olympiad (2012)
- Born: Richard Royce Schrock; January 4, 1945 (age 81); Berne, Indiana, United States
- Education: University of California, Riverside (BA); Harvard University (PhD)
- Known for: Organic chemistry; Olefin metathesis reactions
- Spouse: Nancy Carlson (m. 1971)
- Children: 2
- Awards: Nobel Prize in Chemistry (2005); Basolo Medal (2007); ForMemRS (2008)
- Scientific career
- Fields: Chemistry
- Workplaces: DuPont; MIT; University of Cambridge; University of California, Riverside
- Thesis: Synthesis and study of some Group VIII transition metal catalysts (1972)
- Doctoral advisor: John A. Osborn
- Other academic advisors: Jack Lewis (post doctoral)
- Doctoral students: Guillermo Bazan; Christopher C. Cummins
- Other notable students: Post-docs: Geoffrey Cloke
- Website: web.mit.edu/rrs/www/home.html

Richard Royce Schrock (born January 4, 1945) is an American chemist and Nobel laureate recognized for his contributions to the olefin metathesis reaction used in organic chemistry.

== Education ==
Richard Schrock was born on January 4, 1945, in Berne, Indiana, into an Amish family. Schrock went to Mission Bay High School in Pacific Beach, San Diego, California. He holds a B.A. (1967) from the University of California, Riverside and a Ph.D. (1971) from Harvard University under the direction of John A. Osborn.

== Career ==
Following his PhD, Schrock carried out postdoctoral research at the University of Cambridge with Jack Lewis. In 1972, he was hired by DuPont, where he worked at the Experimental Station in Wilmington, Delaware in the group of George Parshall. He joined the faculty of the Massachusetts Institute of Technology in 1975 and became full professor in 1980.

He has been the Frederick G. Keyes Professor of Chemistry, at MIT since 1989, and is now Professor Emeritus. Schrock is a member of the American Academy of Arts and Sciences, National Academy of Sciences and was elected to the Board of Overseers of Harvard University in 2007.

He is co-founder and member of the board of a Swiss-based company, XiMo, inc., now owned by Verbio, AG, which is focused on the development and application of proprietary metathesis catalysts.

In 2018, Schrock joined the faculty of his alma mater, the University of California, Riverside, where he is now the Distinguished Professor and George K. Helmkamp Founder's Chair of Chemistry. He cited his interest in mentoring junior faculty and students. "My experience as an undergraduate at UCR in research in the laboratory of James Pitts and the quality of the classes in chemistry prepared me for my Ph.D. experience at Harvard. I look forward to returning to UCR for a few years to give back some of what it gave to me," Schrock said.

== Research ==
In 1974 Schrock discovered the alpha hydrogen abstraction reaction, which creates alkylidene complexes from alkyls and alkylidyne complexes from alkylidenes. At MIT Schrock was the first to elucidate the structure and mechanism of so-called 'black box' olefin metathesis catalysts. He showed that the alpha abstraction reaction could be used to prepare molybdenum or tungsten alkylidene and alkylidyne complexes in large variety through ligand variations. Catalysts could then be designed at a molecular level for a given purpose. Schrock has done much work to demonstrate that metallacyclobutanes are the key intermediates in olefin metathesis, while metallacyclobutadienes are the key intermediates in alkyne metathesis. Projects outside of metathesis include elucidating the mechanism of dinitrogen fixation and developing single molecule catalysts which form ammonia from dinitrogen, mimicking the activity of nitrogenase enzymes in biology.

Many supporting ligands have been explored in efforts to better understand the nature of the single molecule catalysts, most notably 2,6-diisopropylphenylimido and adamantylimido, as well as various tert-butyl alkoxides with varying degrees of fluorination. The prototypical Schrock catalyst is (R"O)_{2}(R'N)Mo(CHR) where R = tert-butyl, R' = 2,6-diisopropylphenyl, and R" = C(Me)(CF_{3})_{2}. Such catalysts are now commercially available from such major suppliers as Sigma-Aldrich and XiMo, inc., which is now owned by Verbio, AG, and are used frequently in synthetic applications of olefin metathesis in the laboratory and on a commercial scale. Schrock's work is ongoing with goals of furthering the understanding of metathesis selectivity, developing new catalyst architectures, and elucidating how alkylidenes and alkylidynes are formed naturally from olefins.

== Awards and honors ==
=== Nobel Prize ===
In 2005, Schrock received the Nobel Prize in Chemistry, with Robert H. Grubbs and Yves Chauvin, for his work in the area of olefin metathesis, an organic synthesis technique. In addition to the Nobel Prize, Schrock has won numerous awards including:

- ACS Award in Organometallic Chemistry (1985)
- Harrison Howe Award of the Rochester ACS section (1990)
- Alexander von Humboldt Award (1995)
- ACS Award in Inorganic Chemistry (1996)
- Bailar Medal from the University of Illinois (1998)
- ACS Cope Scholar Award (2001)
- Sir Geoffrey Wilkinson Lecturer and Medalist (2002)
- Sir Edward Frankland Prize Lecturer (2004)
- F. Albert Cotton Award in Synthetic Inorganic Chemistry (2006)
- Theodore Richards Medal from the Northeast ACS section (2006)
- August Wilhelm von Hofmann Medal from the German Chemical Society (2005)
- Basolo Medal (2007)
- Elected a Foreign Member of the Royal Society (ForMemRS) in 2008.
- Chemistry library at the University of Sussex named in his honour (2013)
- Schrock carbenes are named in his honour

== Personal life ==
Schrock married Nancy Carlson in 1971 and has two children, Andrew and Eric. Nancy Schrock was the Thomas F. Peterson Jr. Conservator of Special Collections for the MIT Libraries from 2006 to 2013. The family lives in Winchester, Massachusetts.
