= Alan Cowley =

British chemist (1934–2020)

Alan Herbert Cowley FRS (29 January 1934 – 2 August 2020) was a British chemist, and Robert A. Welch Chair at the University of Texas at Austin. He was a 1976 Guggenheim Fellow.

== Life ==
He earned a BS in 1955, MS in 1956, and PhD in 1958, from University of Manchester. He taught at the University of Texas at Austin, from 1962 to 1998. He was the Sir Edward Frankland Professor of Inorganic Chemistry, at Imperial College, London, from 1988 to 1989.

He died on 2 August 2020.
