= Hexamethyltungsten =

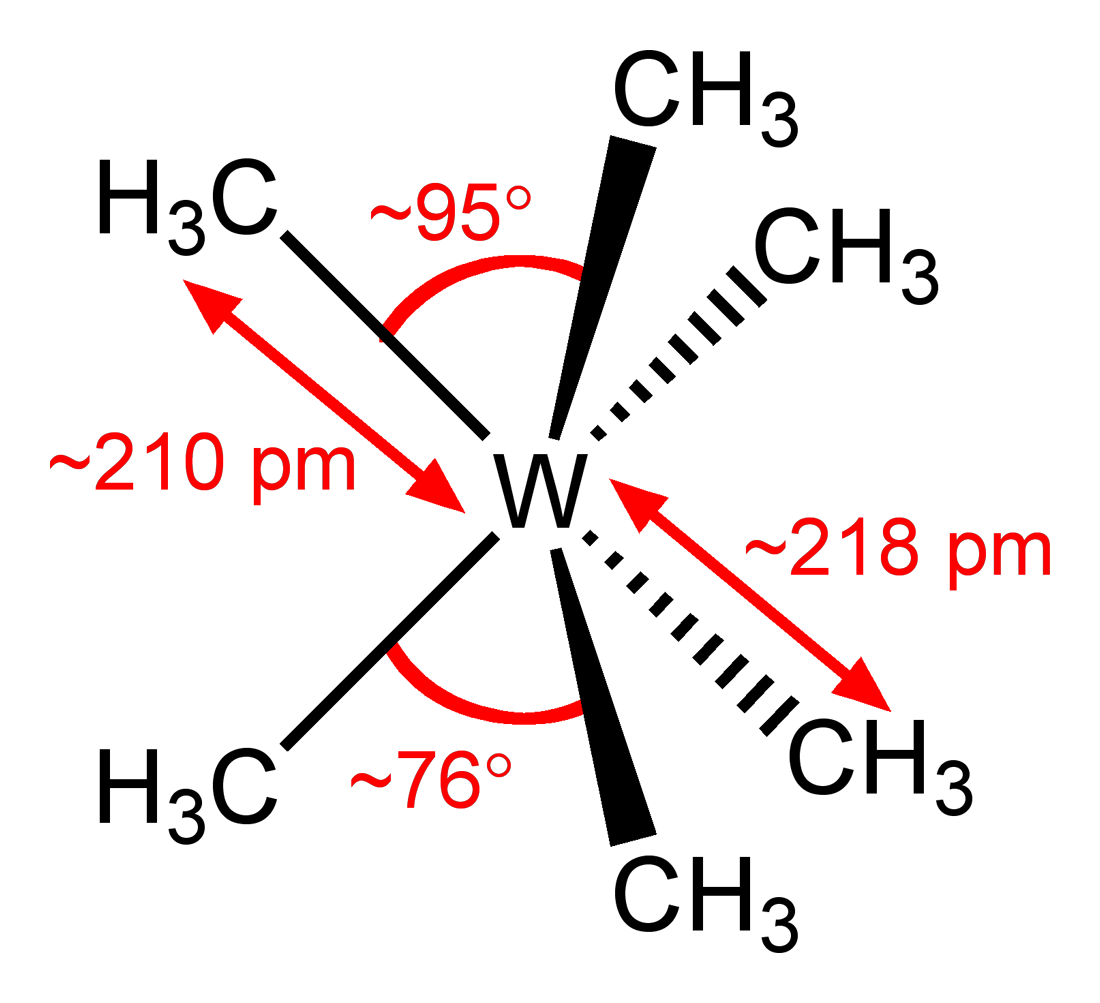
Stereo, skeletal formula of hexamethyltungsten with all implicit hydrogens shown, and assorted dimensions
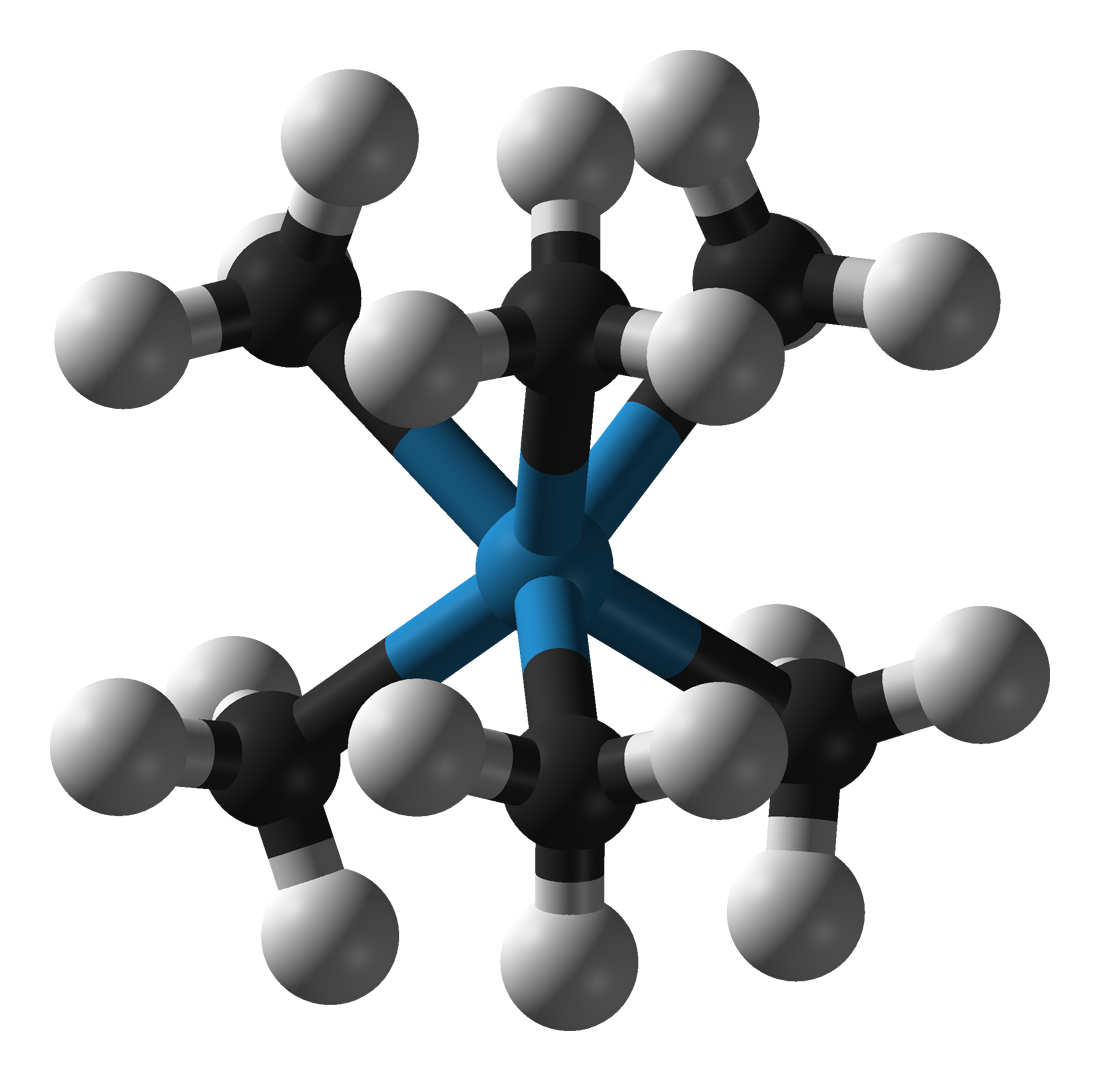
Ball and stick model of hexamethyltungsten

Names
- Other names Tungsten hexamethyl

Identifiers
| CAS Number | 36133-73-0 |
| 3D model (JSmol) | Interactive image |
| ChEBI | CHEBI:30522 |
| ChemSpider | 11659456 |
| Gmelin Reference | 505585 |
| PubChem CID | 142049 |
| CompTox Dashboard (EPA) | DTXSID601027134 |
- InChI: InChI=1S/6CH3.W/h6*1H3; Key: XWAZCLPCQDERBK-UHFFFAOYSA-N
- SMILES: C[W](C)(C)(C)(C)C

Properties
| Chemical formula | C_{6}H_{18}W |
| Molar mass | 274.05 g·mol^{−1} |
| Appearance | Red crystalline solid / Vivid red gas |

Structure
| Molecular shape | Trigonal prismatic |
- Except where otherwise noted, data are given for materials in their standard state (at 25 °C [77 °F], 100 kPa). verify (what is ?) Infobox references

Hexamethyltungsten is the chemical compound W(CH_{3})_{6} also written WMe_{6}. Classified as a transition metal alkyl complex, hexamethyltungsten is an air-sensitive, red, crystalline solid at room temperature; however, it is extremely volatile and sublimes at −30 °C. Owing to its six methyl groups it is extremely soluble in petroleum, aromatic hydrocarbons, ethers, carbon disulfide, and carbon tetrachloride.

== Synthesis ==
Hexamethyltungsten was first reported in 1973 by Wilkinson and Shortland, who described its preparation by the reaction of methyllithium with tungsten hexachloride in diethyl ether. The synthesis was motivated in part by previous work which indicated that tetrahedral methyl transition metal compounds are thermally unstable, in the hopes that an octahedral methyl compound would prove to be more robust. In 1976, Wilkinson and Galyer disclosed an improved synthesis using trimethylaluminium in conjunction with trimethylamine, instead of methyllithium. The stoichiometry of the improved synthesis is as follows:

WCl_{6} + 6 Al(CH_{3})_{3} → W(CH_{3})_{6} + 6 Al(CH_{3})_{2}Cl

Alternatively, the alkylation can employ dimethylzinc:

WX_{6} + 3 Zn(CH_{3})_{2} → W(CH_{3})_{6} + 3 ZnX_{2} (X = F, Cl)

== Molecular geometry ==
W(CH_{3})_{6} adopts a distorted trigonal prismatic geometry with C_{3v} symmetry for the WC_{6} framework and C_{3} symmetry including the hydrogen atoms. The structure (excluding the hydrogen atoms) can be thought of as consisting of a central atom, capped on either side by two eclipsing sets of three carbon atoms, with one triangular set slightly larger but also closer to the central atom than the other. The trigonal prismatic geometry is unusual in that the vast majority of six-coordinate organometallic compounds adopt octahedral molecular geometry. In the initial report, the IR spectroscopy results were interpreted in terms of an octahedral structure. In 1978, a study using photoelectron spectroscopy appeared to confirm the initial assignment of an O_{h} structure.

The octahedral assignment remained for nearly 20 years until 1989 when Girolami and Morse showed that [Zr(CH_{3})_{6}]^{2−} was trigonal prismatic as indicated by X-ray crystallography. They interpreted the non-octahedral structure as the result of a second-order Jahn-Teller effect, and predicted that other d^{0} ML_{6} species such as [Nb(CH_{3})_{6}]^{−}, [Ta(CH_{3})_{6}]^{−}, and W(CH_{3})_{6} would also prove to be trigonal prismatic. This report prompted other investigations into the structure of W(CH_{3})_{6}. Using gas-phase electron diffraction, Volden et al. confirmed that W(CH_{3})_{6} is indeed trigonal prismatic structure with either D_{3h} or C_{3v} symmetry. In 1996, Seppelt et al. reported that W(CH_{3})_{6} had a strongly distorted trigonal prismatic coordination geometry based on single-crystal X-ray diffraction, which they later confirmed in 1998.

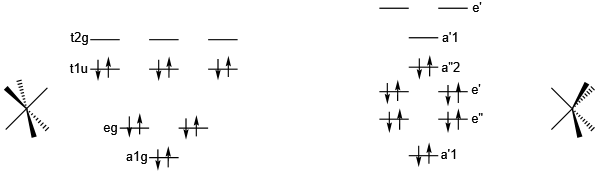
The molecular orbit explanation for the distortion of octahedral complexes into trigonal prismatic complexes

As shown in the top figure at right, the ideal or D_{3h} trigonal prism in which all six carbon atoms are equivalent is distorted to the C_{3v} structure observed by Seppelt et al. by opening up one set of three methyl groups (upper triangle) to wider C-W-C angles (94-97°) with slightly shorter C-W bond lengths, while closing the other set of three methyls (lower triangle) to 75-78° with longer bond lengths.

As suggested originally by Girolami in 1989, deviation from octahedral geometry can be ascribed to a second-order Jahn-Teller distortion. In 1995, before the work of Seppelt and Pfennig but after Girolami's work, Landis and coworkers predicted a distorted trigonal prismatic structure based on valence bond theory and VALBOND calculations.

The history of the structure of W(CH_{3})_{6} illustrates an inherent difficulty in interpreting spectral data for new compounds: initial data may not provide reason to believe the structure deviates from a presumed geometry based on significant historical precedence, but there is always the possibility that the initial assignment will prove to be incorrect. Prior to 1989, there was no reason to suspect that ML_{6} compounds were anything but octahedral, yet new evidence and improved characterization methods suggested that perhaps there were exceptions to the rule, as evidenced by the case of W(CH_{3})_{6}. These discoveries helped to spawn re-evaluation of the theoretical considerations for ML_{6} geometries.

Other 6-coordinate complexes with distorted trigonal prismatic structures include [MoMe_{6}], [NbMe_{6}]^{−}, and [TaPh_{6}]^{−}. All are d^{0} complexes. Some 6-coordinate complexes with regular trigonal prismatic structures (D_{3h} symmetry) include [ReMe_{6}] (d^{1}), [TaMe_{6}]^{−} (d^{0}), and the aforementioned [ZrMe_{6}]^{2−} (d^{0}).

== Reactivity and potential uses ==
At room temperature, hexamethyltungsten decomposes, releasing methane and trace amounts of ethane. The black residue is purported to contain polymethylene and tungsten, but the decomposition of W(CH_{3})_{6} to form tungsten metal is highly unlikely. The following equation is the approximate stoichiometry proposed by Wilkinson and Shortland:

W(CH_{3})_{6} → 3 CH_{4} + (CH_{3})_{2} + W

Like many organometallic complexes, WMe_{6} is destroyed by oxygen. Similarly, acids give methane and unidentified tungsten derivatives, while halogens give the methyl halide and leave the tungsten halide.

A patent application was submitted in 1991 suggesting the use of W(CH_{3})_{6} in the manufacture of semiconductor devices for chemical vapor deposition of tungsten thin films; however, to date it has not been used for this purpose. Rather, tungsten hexafluoride and hydrogen are used instead.

Treatment of W(CH_{3})_{6} with F_{2} diluted with Ne at −90 °C affords W(CF_{3})_{6} in 50% yield as an extremely volatile white solid. Hexamethyltungsten(VI) reacts with trimethylphosphine in light petroleum to give WMe_{6}(PMe_{3}), which in neat PMe_{3}, with U.V. irradiation gives the carbyne complex trans-WMe(:::CMe)(PMe_{3})_{4} in high yield.

== Safety considerations ==
Serious explosions have been reported as a result of working with W(CH_{3})_{6}, even in the absence of air.

== See also ==
- Organometallic chemistry
- Tungsten hexachloride
