= Trigonal prismatic molecular geometry =

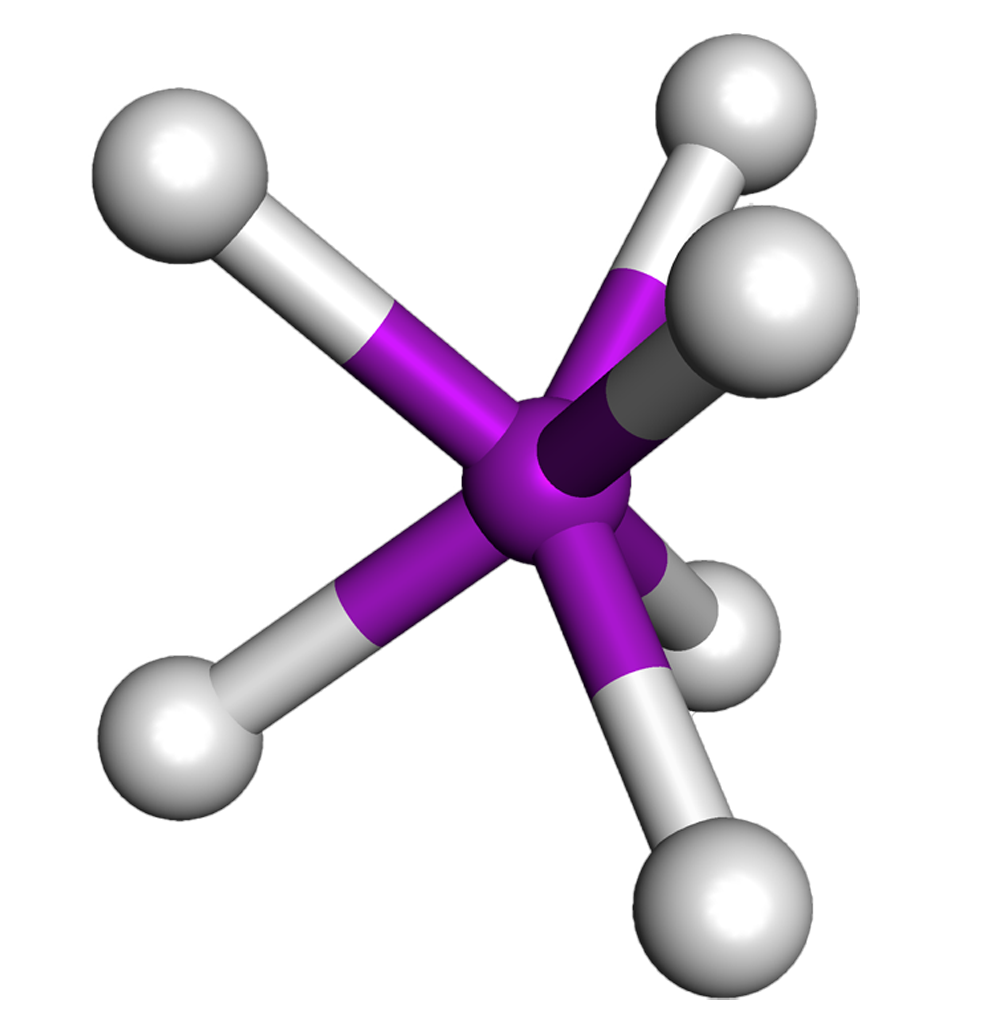
- Examples: W(CH_{3})_{6}
- Point group: D_{3h}
- Coordination number: 6
- μ (Polarity): 0

In chemistry, the trigonal prismatic molecular geometry describes the shape of compounds where six atoms, groups of atoms, or ligands are arranged around a central atom, defining the vertices of a triangular prism. The structure commonly occurs for d^{0}, d^{1} and d^{2} transition metal complexes with covalently-bound ligands and small charge separation. In d^{0} complexes it may be ascribed to sd^{5} hybridization, but in d^{1} and d^{2} complexes the d_{z^{2}} orbital is occupied by nonbonding electron (pair). Furthermore, when unoccupied, said orbital participates in bonding and causes C_{3v} distortion, like in W(CH_{3})_{6}.

== Examples ==
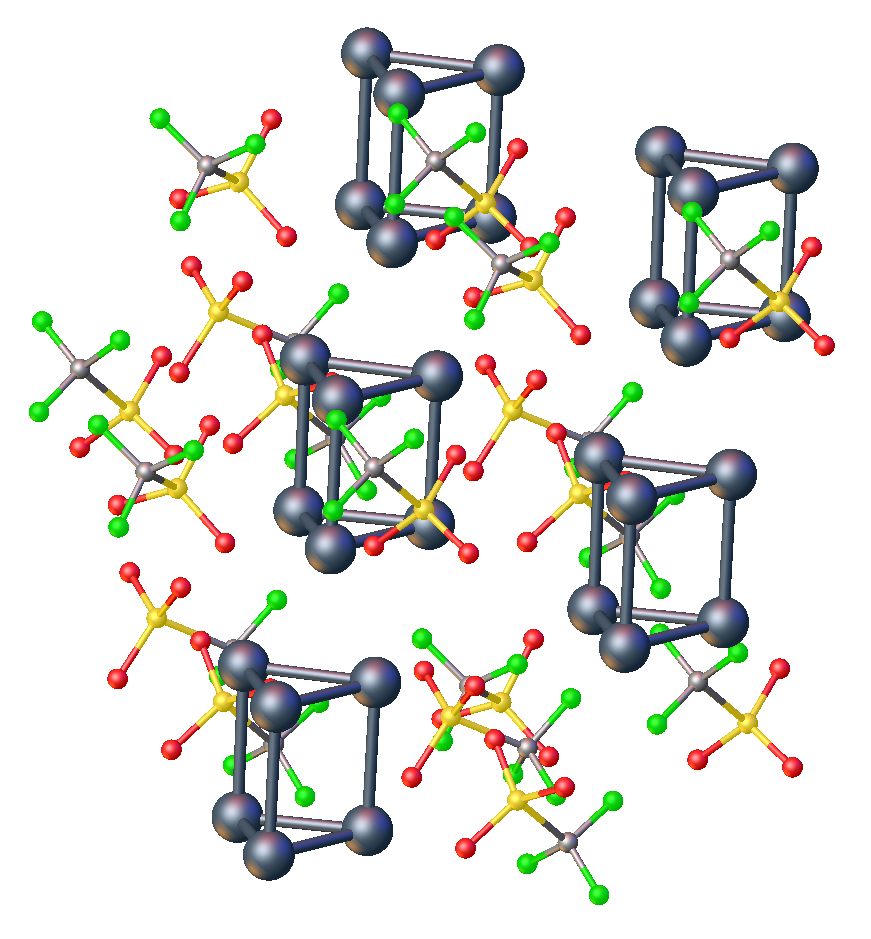
Portion of lattice of [Te_{6}](O_{3}SCF_{3})_{2}. The intra- and inter-triangle Te–Te distances are 2.70 and 3.06 Å, respectively.

Hexamethyltungsten (W(CH_{3})_{6}) was the first example of a molecular trigonal prismatic complex. The figure shows the six carbon atoms arranged at the vertices of a triangular prism with the tungsten at the centre. The hydrogen atoms are not shown.

Some other transition metals have trigonal prismatic hexamethyl complexes, including both neutral molecules such as Mo(CH_{3})_{6} and Re(CH_{3})_{6} and ions such as Ta(CH_{3})^{−}_{6} and Zr(CH_{3})^{2−}_{6}.

The complex Mo(S−CH=CH−S)_{3} is also trigonal prismatic, with each S−CH=CH−S group acting as a bidentate ligand with two sulfur atoms binding the metal atom. Here the coordination geometry of the six sulfur atoms around the molybdenum is similar to that in the extended structure of molybdenum disulfide (MoS_{2}).
