= William B. Tolman =

American Inorganic Chemist

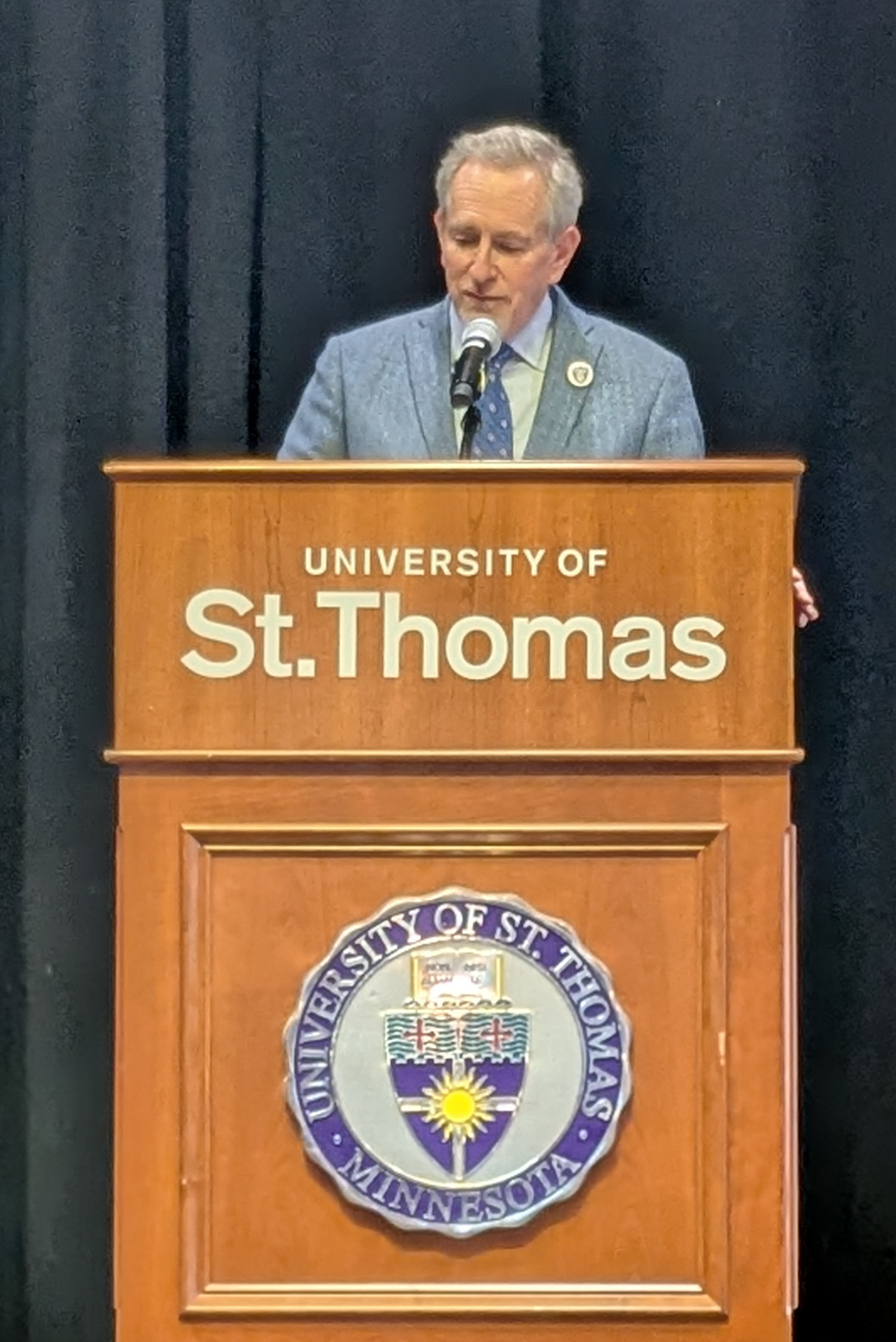
- Tolman speaking at the University of St. Thomas in 2025
- Born: William Baker Tolman; May 20, 1961 (age 65); Cleveland, Ohio
- Education: University of California, Berkeley Ph.D. (1987); Wesleyan University B.A. (1983)
- Known for: Bioinorganic chemistry of copper and dioxygen
- Awards: ACS Award for Distinguished Service in the Advancement of Inorganic Chemistry (2017)
- Scientific career
- Fields: Bioinorganic chemistry
- Workplaces: University of St. Thomas (2022 - Current) Washington University in St. Louis (2018-2022); University of Minnesota (1990-2018) Massachusetts Institute of Technology (1987-1990)
- Thesis: Photochemistry and ligand substitution chemistry of (fulvalene) diruthenium (tetracarbonyl) (1987)
- Doctoral advisor: Peter C. Vollhardt
- Other academic advisors: Alan R. Cutler, Stephen J. Lippard
- Website: sites.wustl.edu/tolmangrouplaboratory/

William B. Tolman (born May 20, 1961, in Cleveland, Ohio) an American inorganic chemist focusing on the synthesis and characterization of model bioinorganic systems, and organometallic approaches towards polymer chemistry. He is currently the Al and Mary Agnes McQuinn Distinguished Chair and Dean of the College of Arts and Sciences at the University of St. Thomas (Minnesota). He has served as Editor in Chief of the ACS journal Inorganic Chemistry, and as a Senior Investigator at the NSF Center for Sustainable Polymers. Tolman is a Fellow of the American Association for the Advancement of Science and the American Chemical Society.

== Early life and education ==
Tolman was born on May 20, 1961, in Cleveland, but grew up in Chelmsford, Massachusetts. He received his B.A. in chemistry from Wesleyan University in 1983, where he conducted organometallic chemistry research with Alan R. Cutler. With Cutler, Tolman studied the bimetallic activation of coordinated ligands of molybdenum cyclopentadienyl complexes.

Tolman then moved on to graduate studies at the University of California, Berkeley, where he worked in the laboratory of Prof. K. Peter C. Vollhardt as a W. R. Grace Graduate Fellow. In Vollhardt's laboratory, Tolman studied photochemistry and ligand substitution reactions of bimetallic coordination complexes with the fulvalene ligand. Tolman graduated with a Ph.D. in chemistry in 1987.

He then conducted his postdoc in the laboratory of Prof. Stephen J. Lippard at the Massachusetts Institute of Technology with the support of a fellowship from the American Cancer Society. With Prof. Lippard, Tolman synthesized novel ligands for coordination complexes that model the active sites of metalloproteins. He then synthesized complexes that model nonheme diiron proteins, and studied their reactivity with O_{2}.

== Career ==
Tolman began his independent career in 1990, as an assistant professor in the Department of Chemistry at the University of Minnesota, Twin Cities (UMN). He was appointed a Distinguished McKnight University Professor in 2000. He previously served as the Chair of the Department of Chemistry at UMN, from 2009 to 2016. In 2018, Tolman moved with his research group to Washington University in St. Louis. Generally, Tolman's research group works on the synthesis of bioinorganic coordination complexes that model the active sites of metalloproteins, as well as the synthesis of organometallic complexes for the polymerization of cyclic esters.

In the summer of 2022, Tolman became the dean of the College of Arts and Sciences at the University of St. Thomas, in St. Paul, Minnesota.

=== Copper-oxygen adducts ===
Tolman's work in the bioinorganic field focuses on Cu-O adducts, specifically copper proteins whose diverse, biological functions include: O_{2} transport, aromatic ring oxidations, biogenesis of hormones. His work studies the potential of 1:1 Cu/O_{2} adducts as catalytic species, which have been known as transient intermediates for more commonly studied 2:1 and even 3:1 Cu/O_{2} molecules. These complexes, while kinetically favored in formation are thermodynamically unstable due to negative entropy values, thus making them more difficult to isolate. Although, increasing ligand sizes on these 1:1 adducts did correlate with slower reaction rate constants; advantageous for isolating and studying these complexes.

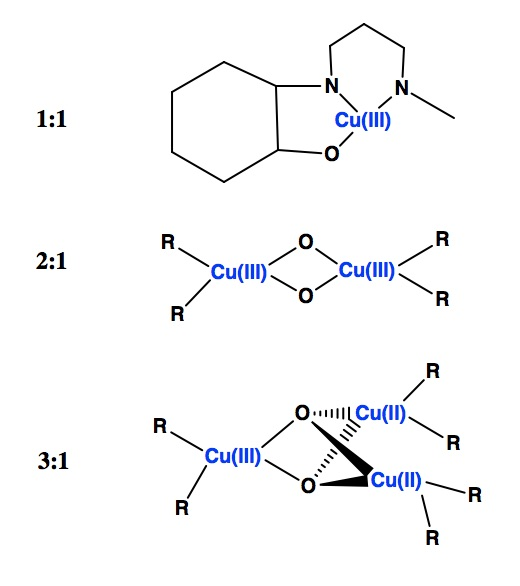
This figure shows copper and oxygen bonded at differing ratios.

Furthermore, his work on high and mixed valent copper species including [CuOH]^{+2} and its conjugate base, [CuO]^{+} is also very notable. His work with [CuOH]^{+2} reveals a high reactivity with C-H and O-H bonds as compared to its conjugate acid pair. This is of importance when trying to replicate biological mechanisms, such as copper-catalyzed oxidation in vitro.

His research has contributed to the discovery and characterization of new biomimetic species. It is his goal to not only identify these compounds, but to comprehensively understand the intermediates and mechanisms with which they play crucial roles in facilitating. In the case of Cu/O_{2} adducts, realizing their biological role and function in copper containing enzymes can give rise to new insights on their biomimetic properties.

Additionally, his lab is searching for alternative, synthetic oxidative catalysis. This includes designing biochemically inspired synthetic catalysts as well as trying O_{2} as a candidate for controlled, in vitro oxidation. Due to high abundances and relatively strong stabilizing capabilities within biological reactions, iron and copper enzymes inspire biomimetic synthetic catalysts. Although these reactions perform with high accuracy and selectivity within the body, many challenges arise when working with O_{2} in vitro because of the undesired and potentially harmful side products that can be generated.

=== Organometallic polymerization catalysts ===
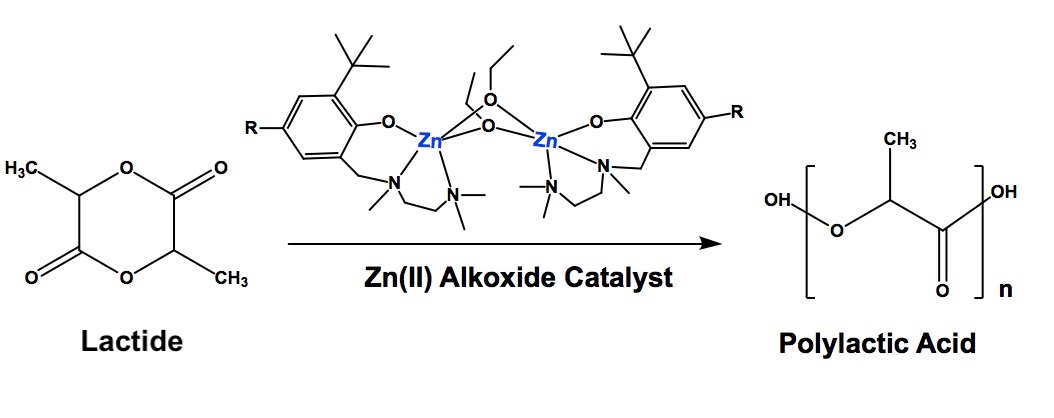
Polymerization of lactide to polylactic acid with a Zn(II) alkoxide catalyst.

Tolman's work on organometallic polymerization catalysis focuses on the development of new metal catalysts for the more efficient polymerization of lactones into biodegradable polymers. An example of this work is the use of Zn(II) or Fe(III) alkoxide catalysts, which can polymerize lactide (LA) into polylactic acid (PLA). PLA is of great interest because it is both biodegradable and a renewable resource. While there are many well known catalysts available to synthesize PLA, not much is known about their mechanism of catalysis - this proves problematic in the design of new and more efficient catalysts. Thus, Tolman's group is pursuing the synthesis and characterization of less structurally complex catalysts. His research has showed that catalysts with lower coordination numbers have higher polymerization activities. His Zn(II) alkoxide catalyst, for example, produced PLA with a high molecular weight at a relatively fast rate.

=== Role in Gianluigi Veglia sexual harassment investigation ===
As UMN Chemistry Department Chair in 2017, Tolman was one of four administrators notified about, and provided the results of, an investigation into allegations involving UMN biochemistry and chemistry professor Gianluigi Veglia. Tolman left UMN the following year for a position in the Arts and Sciences at Washington University in St. Louis.

== Awards ==
Tolman is the recipient of many awards for his research, including an ACS Award for Distinguished Service in the Advancement of Inorganic Chemistry in 2017, the Charles E. Bowers Teaching Award from the University of Minnesota in 2012, a Alexander von Humboldt Foundation Research Award for 2004–2005, a Buck-Whitney Medal from the ACS Eastern New York Section in 2001, a Camille & Henry Dreyfus Teacher–Scholar Award in 1999, and a Searle Scholars Award in 1992.

He was elected a Fellow of the American Chemical Society in 2010, and a Fellow of the American Association for the Advancement of Science in 2006.
