= Richard A. Andersen (chemist) =

Inorganic chemist (1942–2019)

Richard Allan Andersen
- Born: November 16, 1942; Oklahoma, United States
- Died: June 16, 2019 (aged 76)
- Education: University of South Dakota B.A. (1965); University of Wyoming Ph.D. (1973)
- Scientific career
- Fields: Inorganic Chemistry, Organometallic Chemistry
- Workplaces: University of California, Berkeley
- Thesis: Sterically Hindered Beryllium Alkoxides and Some of their Derivatives (1973)
- Doctoral advisor: Geoffrey Coates
- Other academic advisors: Geoffrey Wilkinson
- Doctoral students: John Hartwig, Don Tilley, Gregory Girolami

Richard Allan Andersen (November 16, 1942 – June 16, 2019) was a professor of chemistry at the University of California, Berkeley, and faculty senior scientist at the chemical sciences division of Lawrence Berkeley National Laboratory.

== Early life and career ==
Born in Oklahoma in 1942, Richard Allan Andersen was raised and educated in the small town of Yankton, South Dakota. He obtained his bachelor's degree in 1965 from the University of South Dakota. Andersen pursued graduate studies at the University of Wyoming, working under the supervision of Professor Geoffrey Coates. Andersen was Coates' last student. In 1973, Andersen earned his Ph.D. with studies on several fundamental organometallic and alkoxide compounds of beryllium.

Andersen then spent a year as postdoctoral researcher at the Oslo Centre for Industrial Research. On the day it was announced that Geoffrey Wilkinson and Ernst O. Fisher would share the 1973 Nobel Prize in Chemistry, Andersen received an offer to conduct his postdoctoral research in Wilkinson's laboratory at Imperial College London. Andersen took up this post a few months later, in 1974. In June 1976 he joined the faculty at the University of California, Berkeley's department of chemistry. He remained a professor in the department until his death in 2019.

Andersen was also active in teaching throughout his career, and was well-known for teaching from the primary inorganic chemistry literature, as well as his hands-on approach to teaching undergraduate laboratory courses.

== Research ==
Andersen began his independent research career at UC Berkeley in 1976. Initially his research focused on ligand substitution patterns in quadruply-bonded Mo_{2} complexes. He also studied actinide coordination complexes bearing the sterically bulky amido ligand –N(SiMe_{3})_{2}, including the uranium(III) compound U[N(SiMe_{3})_{2}]_{3,} which was later found to have pyramidal geometry.

== Awards and honors ==
Andersen was awarded many Visiting Professorships around the world, including appointments in Sevilla, Lyon, Montpellier, New South Wales, and Zurich. He was also an Alexander von Humboldt Professor in various locations in Germany (1994). Andersen was also a member of the Royal Chemical Society, American Chemical Society, and Sigma Xi.
