= Geoffrey Wilkinson =

English chemist and Nobel prize winner (1921–1996)

Sir Geoffrey Wilkinson FRS
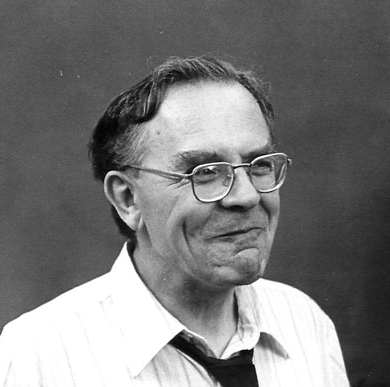
- Wilkinson c. 1976
- Born: 14 July 1921; Todmorden, West Riding of Yorkshire, England
- Died: 26 September 1996 (aged 75); London, England
- Education: Imperial College London (PhD)
- Known for: Wilkinson's catalyst
- Awards: Nobel Prize in Chemistry (1973); Royal Medal (1981); Ludwig Mond Award (1981); Davy Medal (1996)
- Scientific career
- Fields: Inorganic chemistry
- Workplaces: Chalk River Laboratories; University of California, Berkeley; Massachusetts Institute of Technology; Harvard University; Imperial College London
- Thesis: Some physico-chemical observations on hydrolysis in the homogeneous vapour phase (1946)
- Doctoral advisor: Henry Vincent Aird Briscoe
- Other academic advisors: Glenn T. Seaborg (post doctoral advisor)
- Doctoral students: F. Albert Cotton; Andrew R. Barron; Martin A. Bennett; Alan Davison; Malcolm Green; John A. Osborn
- Other notable students: Richard A. Andersen (postdoc)
- Website: The Wilkinson Foundation

Sir Geoffrey Wilkinson FRS (14 July 1921 – 26 September 1996) was a Nobel laureate English chemist who pioneered inorganic chemistry and homogeneous transition metal catalysis.

== Early life and education ==
Wilkinson was born at Springside, Todmorden, in the West Riding of Yorkshire. His father, Henry Wilkinson, was a master house painter and decorator; his mother, Ruth, worked in a local cotton mill. One of his uncles, an organist and choirmaster, had married into a family that owned a small chemical company making Epsom and Glauber's salts for the pharmaceutical industry; this is where he first developed an interest in chemistry.

He was educated at the local council primary school and, after winning a County Scholarship in 1932, went to Todmorden Grammar School. His physics teacher there, Luke Sutcliffe, had also taught Sir John Cockcroft, who received a Nobel Prize for "splitting the atom". In 1939 he obtained a Royal Scholarship for study at Imperial College London, from where he graduated in 1941, with his PhD awarded in 1946 entitled "Some physico-chemical observations of hydrolysis in the homogeneous vapour phase".

== Career and research ==
In 1942 Professor Friedrich Paneth was recruiting young chemists for the nuclear energy project. Wilkinson joined and was sent out to Canada, where he stayed in Montreal and later Chalk River Laboratories until he could leave in 1946. For the next four years he worked with Professor Glenn T. Seaborg at University of California, Berkeley, mostly on nuclear taxonomy. He then became a research associate at the Massachusetts Institute of Technology and began to return to his first interest as a student – transition metal complexes of ligands such as carbon monoxide and olefins.

He was at Harvard University from September 1951 until he returned to England in December 1955, with a sabbatical break of nine months in Copenhagen. At Harvard, he still did some nuclear work on excitation functions for protons in cobalt, but had already begun to work on olefin complexes.

In June 1955 he was appointed to the chair of Inorganic Chemistry at Imperial College London, and from then on worked almost entirely on the complexes of transition metals.

Wilkinson is well known for his popularisation of the use of Wilkinson's catalyst RhCl(PPh_{3})_{3} in catalytic hydrogenation, and for the discovery of the structure of ferrocene. Wilkinson's catalyst is used industrially in the hydrogenation of alkenes to alkanes.

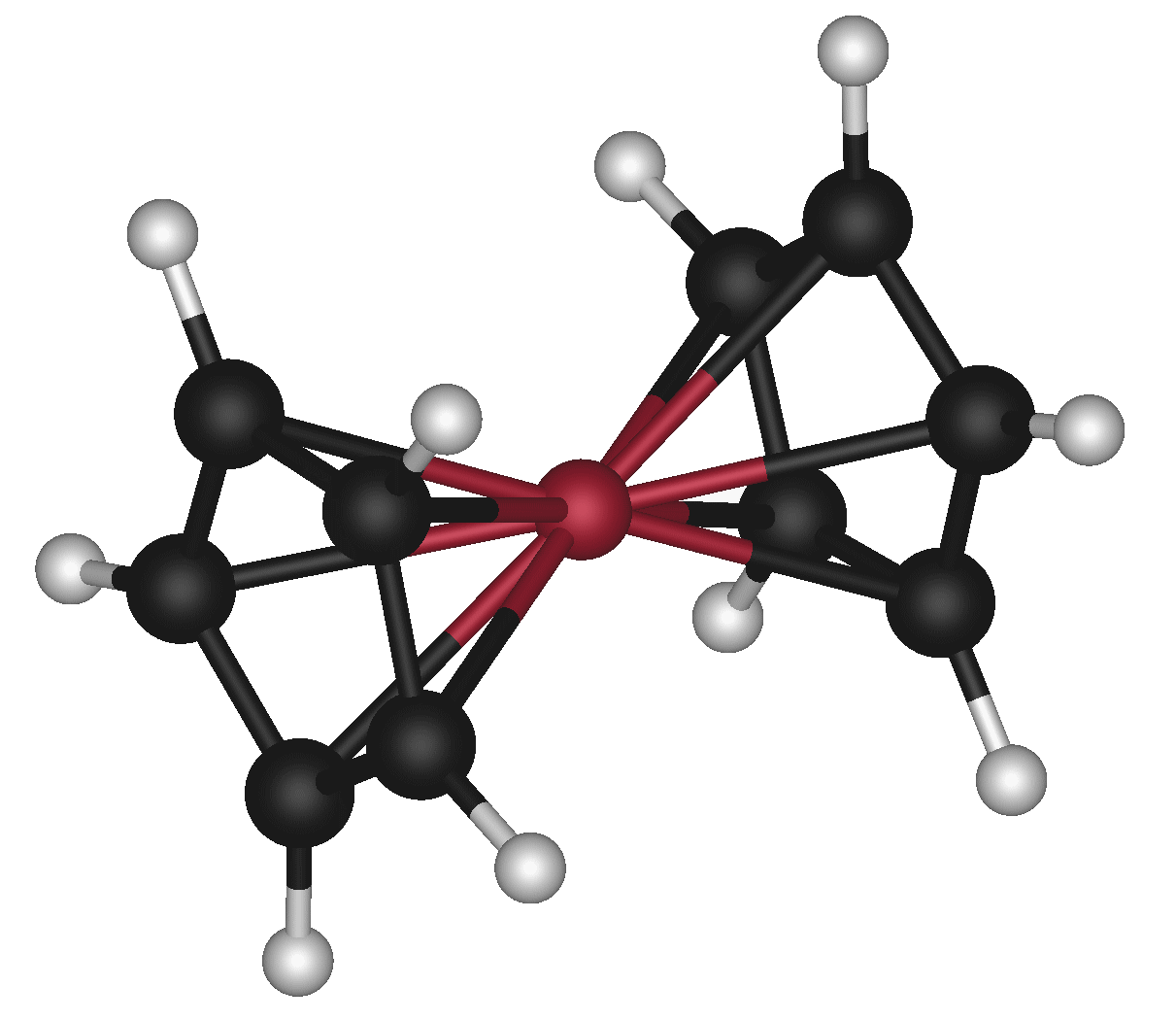
Structure of ferrocene Fe(C_{5}H_{5})_{2}

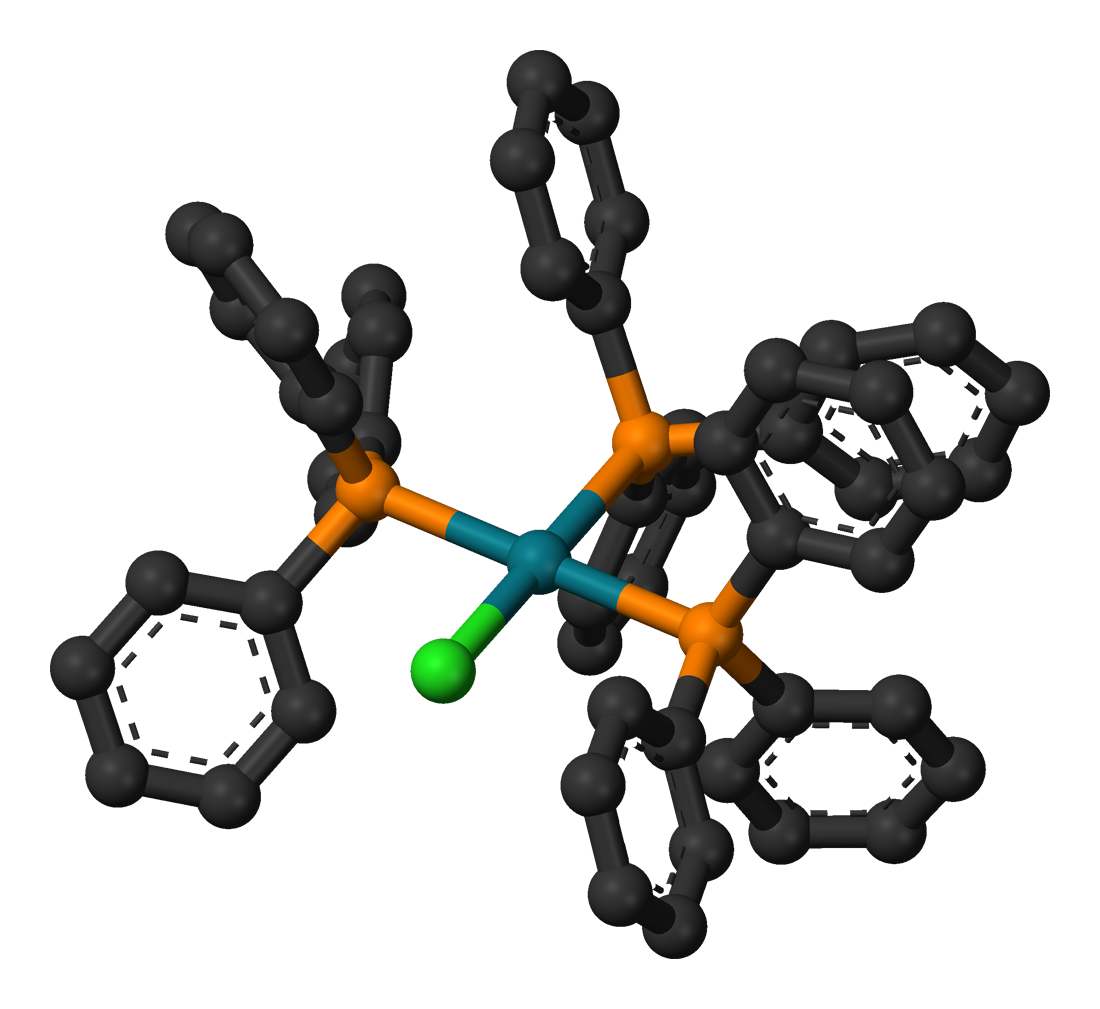
Wilkinson's catalyst RhCl(PPh_{3})_{3}

Wilkinson supervised PhD students and postdoctoral researchers, including F. Albert Cotton, Richard A. Andersen, John A. Osborn, Alan Davison and Malcolm Green. Cotton and Wilkinson collaborated on the book "Advanced Inorganic Chemistry", often referred to simply as "Cotton and Wilkinson", one of the standard inorganic chemistry textbooks.

== Awards and honours ==
Throughout his career, Wilkinson received many prestigious awards, including the Nobel Prize in Chemistry in 1973 for his work on "organometallic compounds" (with Ernst Otto Fischer). Prior to winning the Nobel Prize, he had been elected a Fellow of the Royal Society (FRS) in 1965. In 1968, he won the Lavoisier Medal, awarded by the Chemical Society of France. In 1981, he received the Royal Medal from the Royal Society as well as the Ludwig Mond Award from the Royal Society of Chemistry.

Wilkinson was made a Knight Bachelor by Queen Elizabeth II in the 1976 Birthday Honours. Despite his knighthood, he did not consider himself part of the "establishment" and remained vocally critical of successive British prime ministers, education ministers and university vice-chancellors for insufficient support and funding for the sciences.

Wilkinson also received honorary doctorates and fellowships from several universities, including:

- Columbia University - DSc, 1978
- University of Bath - DSc, 1980
- University of Essex - Honorary Doctorate, 1989
- Imperial College London - Honorary fellowship, 1993

== Personal life ==
Wilkinson was married to Lise Schou, a Danish plant physiologist whom he had met at UC Berkeley. They had two daughters, Anne and Pernille.

== Legacy and commemoration ==
Since 1999, the Royal Society of Chemistry has been awarding the annual Sir Geoffrey Wilkinson Prize (formerly the Sir Geoffrey Wilkinson Lectureship), aimed at celebrating contributions to any area of inorganic chemistry made by a mid-career scientist. The first winner of this prize was Professor Malcolm Green, one of Wilkinson's former students. Since 2022, Imperial College London has been hosting the annual Sir Geoffrey Wilkinson Lecture. Both the Royal Society of Chemistry prize and the annual lecture at Imperial are funded by the Geoffery Wilkinson Charitable Foundation, run by Professor Anne Hardy, one of Wilkinson's daughters. Since 2016, the foundation has also been funding an annual PhD studentship at Imperial in the field of inorganic chemistry.

A blue plaque was installed at 4 Wellington Road, Todmorden in 1990, marking Wilkinson's childhood home. In 2007, the Royal Society of Chemistry erected a plaque at Imperial College London's Chemistry Building in honour of Wilkinson as part of its Chemical Landmark Scheme. Imperial College's Wilkinson Hall, opened in 2009, is named in the chemist's honour.

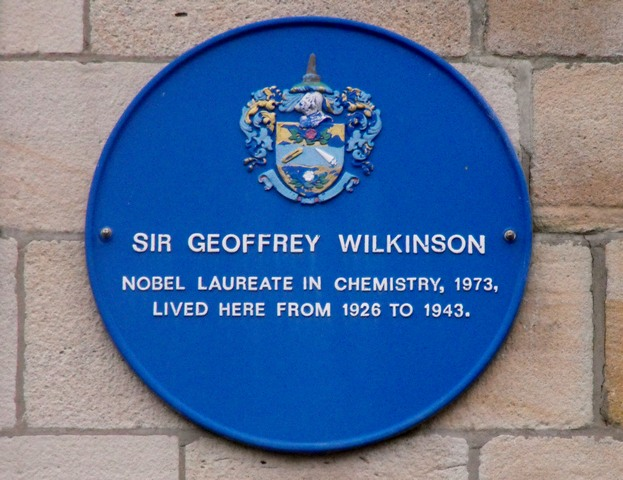
The blue plaque installed at Wilkinson's childhood home in Todmorden, West Yorkshire

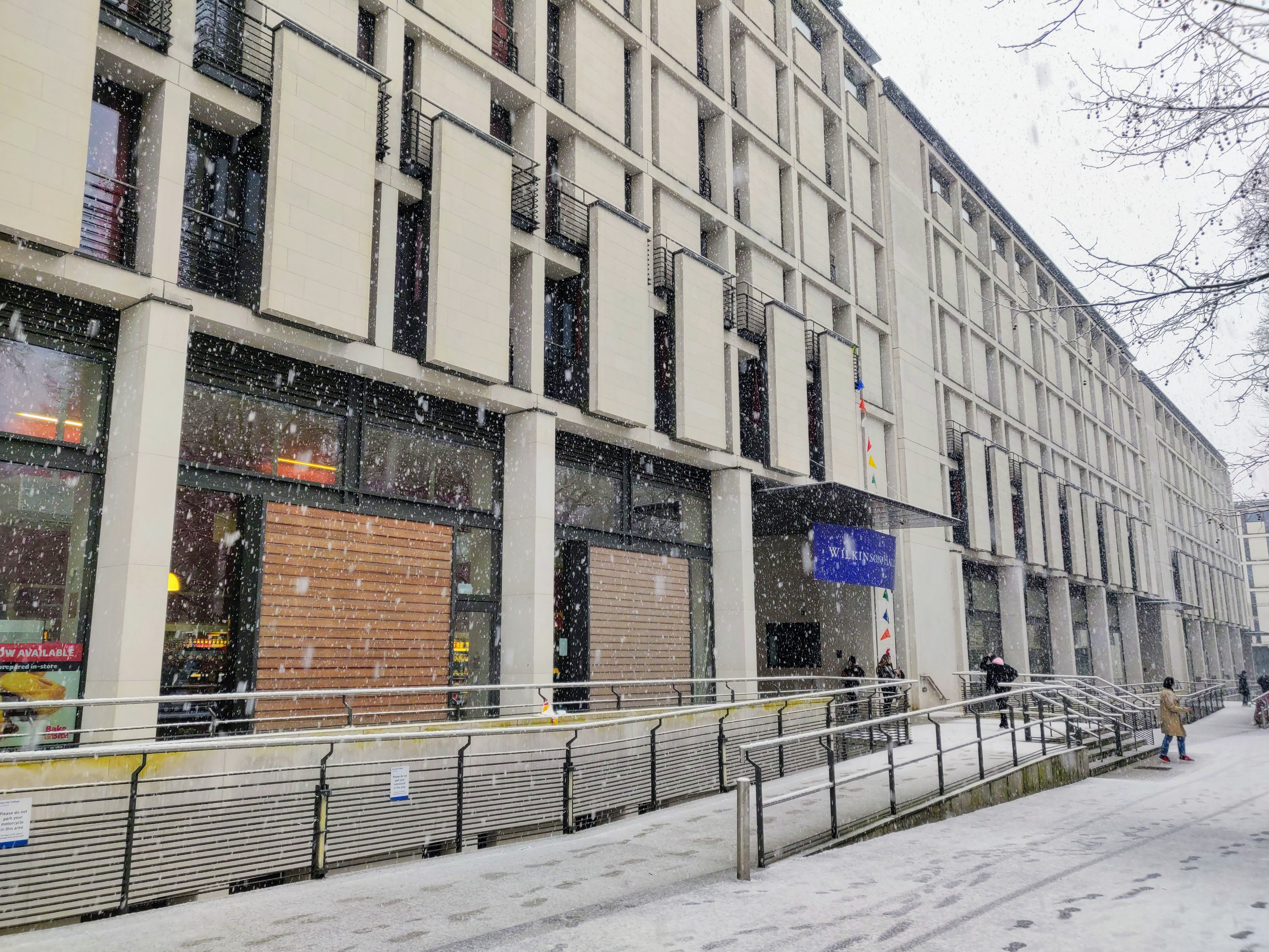
Wilkinson Hall, Imperial College London
