= Beckman Young Investigators Award =

Award administered by the Arnold and Mabel Beckman Foundation

- Awarded for: Innovative young faculty members in the early stages of their academic careers in the chemical and life sciences
- Date: 1991
- Presented by: Arnold and Mabel Beckman Foundation
- Website: http://www.beckman-foundation.org/

The Beckman Young Investigators Award was established by Mabel and Arnold Beckman in 1991, and is now administered by the Arnold and Mabel Beckman Foundation. The Beckman Young Investigator (BYI) Program is intended to provide research support to promising young faculty members in the early stages of their academic careers. Awardees receive grants of roughly $600,000 over four years, "contingent on demonstrated progress after the second year". The intent is to foster "innovative departures" and the invention of methods, instruments and materials that will open up new avenues of research in the chemical and life sciences.

It has been awarded to the following scientists:

== 2021 ==
- Beau Alward
- Roxanne Beltran
- Margaret Byron
- Katherine Davis
- Robert Gilliard
- Tania Lupoli
- Brett McGuire
- Nicolas Pégard
- Alison Wendlandt
- Balyn Zaro
- Yingjie Zhang

== 2020 ==
- John Blazeck
- Jennifer Bridwell-Rabb
- Laura Duvall
- Andrea Giovannucci
- Stavroula Hatzios
- Sarah King
- James McKone
- Yue Wang

== 2019 ==
- Keriann Backus
- Chenfeng Ke
- Wesley Legant
- Frank Leibfarth
- Jarad Mason
- Jia Niu
- Kimberly See
- Leslie Schoop
- Kirk Wangensteen
- Brad Zuchero

== 2018 ==
- Dmitriy Aronov
- Alistair Boettiger
- Henry La Pierre
- Chen Li
- Jean-Hubert Olivier
- Ian Seiple
- Michaela TerAvest
- Ashleigh Theberge
- Weiwei Xie
- Xiaoji Xu

== 2017 ==
- Victor Acosta
- Jeremy Baskin
- Pamela Chang
- Dan Fu
- Erik Grumstrup
- A. Fatih Sarioglu
- Jose Rodriguez
- Bo Wang

== 2016 ==
- Yiyang Gong
- Markita Landry
- Zachary Pincus
- Gabriela Schlau-Cohen
- Sabrina Spencer
- Scott Warren
- Jing-Ke Weng
- Ke Xu

== 2015 ==
- Lawrence David
- David Flannigan
- Yevgenia Kozorovitskiy
- Chang Liu
- Patrick Mercier
- Peter Nemes
- Kang-Kuen Ni
- Alex Shalek

== 2014 ==
- Albert Bowers
- Ludovico Cademartiri
- Prashant Jain
- Reade Roberts
- Wesley Wong
- Yimon Aye
- Yuebing Zheng

== 2013 ==
- Aaron Hoskins
- Christina Stallings
- Delphine Farmer

- Elena Gracheva
- Gordana Dukovic
- Hillel Adesnik
- Poul Petersen

== 2012 ==
- Catherine A. Blish
- Farren J. Isaacs
- Frank Alber
- Louis Bouchard
- William Dichtel

== 2009 ==
- Anne McNeil
- Daniel Zilberman
- David Masopust
- Herschel Wade
- Jon Lai
- Marc Hammarlund
- Nicholas Putnam
- Ruth Ley
- Scott Phillips
- Soichiro Yamada
- Valeria Molinero

== 2008 ==
- Alla Grishok
- Andreas S. Tolias
- Clodagh O'Shea
- E. Charles H. Sykes
- Faik Akif Tezcan
- Ke Hu
- Martin D. Burke
- Michael J. Axtell
- Michelle Chang
- Pieter C. Dorrestein
- Stephen Rogers
- Steven Little
- Tehshik Yoon
- Todd M. Squires
- Vassiliy Lubchenko
- Zefeng Wang

== 2007 ==
- Adrian Salic
- Alexander Deiters
- Amy J. Wagers
- Brent Stockwell
- Christopher W. Bielawski
- Eric S. Huseby
- Garegin Papoian
- Jay A. Gupta
- Joshua J. Coon
- Min Ouyang
- Rachel L. Wilson
- Sean Crosson
- Sean F. Brady
- Shu-Ou Shan
- Siavash K. Kurdistani
- Zemer Gitai

== 2006 ==
- Abraham Stroock
- Andrey S. Krasilnikov
- Anton Nekrutenko
- Arthur Salomon
- David A. Gracias
- David Traver
- Geeta Narlikar
- Hopi Hoekstra
- Jeanne Hardy
- Jeffrey W. Bode
- Jingdong Tian
- Krystyn J. Van Vliet
- Laura Kaufman
- Lei Wang
- Manuel Llinas
- Marc Johnson
- Michael Bulger
- Michael S. Strano
- Mohammad Movassaghi
- Phil S. Baran
- Raymond Schaak
- Sanjay Kumar
- Srinivasan S. Iyengar
- Susan Janicki
- Xi Chen

== 2005 ==
- Audrey P. Gasch
- Carsten Krebs
- Christian Munz
- Christina D. Smolke
- Christopher Chang
- Chuan He
- Glenn Micalizio
- Hyongsok Soh
- Jeffrey J. Gray
- Jing Wang
- Josh Dubnau
- Joshua D. Rabinowitz
- Judith X. Becerra
- Justin P. Gallivan
- Matthew P. DeLisa
- Peng Jin
- Philip LeDuc
- Randy Bartels
- Rebekah Drezek
- Sarah O'Connor
- Stuart Licht
- Theresa M. Reineke
- Volney Sheen
- Yueh-Lin Loo

== 2004 ==
- Akhilesh Pandey
- Brenda S. Schulman
- Brian Kuhlman
- Christine D. Keating
- D. Tyler McQuade
- David M. Rector
- Garth Simpson
- Gavin MacBeath
- Guillermo Ameer
- Jay T. Groves
- Kent L. Hill
- Kevin P. White
- Lara K. Mahal
- Mark J. Schnitzer
- Martin T. Zanni
- Melanie S. Sanford
- Michael H. B. Stowel
- Michael T. Green
- Paul A. Maggard

== 2003 ==
- Adam Matzger
- Alexander Li
- Consuelo de Moraes
- Darrell Irvine
- David Lin
- David Lynn
- Douglas Robinson
- Douglas Smith
- Gregory Odorizzi
- Heather C. Allen
- Kevin Yarema
- Kim Orth
- Kristi Kiick
- Lu Chen
- Paul Hergenrother
- Pingyun Feng
- Rustem Ismagilov
- Sue Biggins
- Xiaowei Zhuang
- Zhan Chen

== 2002 ==
- Andrei Sanov
- Bingwei Lu
- Carla Koehler
- Colin Nuckolls
- Daniel Minor
- David Chan
- David Liu
- Gregory Weiss
- Guoping Feng
- Heather Carlson
- James Schneider
- Jason Hafner
- Melody Swartz
- Peidong Yang
- Shiv Halasyamani
- Yi Sun

== 2001 ==
- Geoffrey Chang
- Gerard C. L. Wong
- Gero Miesenboeck
- Guowei Fang
- Hays S. Rye
- Jonathan Wilker
- Justin Du Bois
- Koen Visscher
- Leslie B. Vosshall
- Linda C. Hsieh-Wilson
- Mark C. Hersam
- Michael J. Caterina
- Paul Cremer
- Paul V. Braun
- William B. Connick
- Zhibin Guan

== 2000 ==
- Aaron W. Harper
- Angela M. Belcher
- Donald H. Burke
- Erik J. Sorensen
- Geoffrey Coates
- James B. Ames
- Jeffrey G. Saven
- Karlene A. Cimprich
- L. Andrew Lyon
- Raffi V. Aroian
- Sarah H. Tolbert
- Sean M. Burgess
- Steven E. Jacobsen
- Vicki Colvin
- Virginia W. Cornish
- Wen Bin Lin

== 1999 ==
- Christopher Lima
- Claudia Turro
- Craig Hunter
- Daniel Feldheim
- Deborah Wuttke
- Douglas Barrick
- George O'Doherty
- John Zhang
- Lee Bardwell
- Mahdi Abu-Omar
- Mei Hong
- Michelle Wang
- Ram Sasisekharan
- Sheila Nirenberg
- Todd Martinez
- Wilfred A. Van Der Donk

== 1998 ==
- Annelise E. Barron
- Carolyn R. Bertozzi
- Charles Brenner
- David Y. Gin
- John L. Bowman
- Joseph Z. Tsien
- Kit J. Pogliano
- Mark C. Lonergan
- Michael D. Sheets
- Richard W. Roberts
- Robert M. Strongin
- Susana Cohen-Cory
- Thomas J. Wandless
- Timothy J. Deming
- William C. Smith
- Yang Dan

== 1997 ==
- Alexei A.Stuchebrukhov
- David S. Bredt
- Elizabeth Gavis
- Jason Shear
- John T. Fourkas
- Michael K. Rosen
- Rafael Yuste
- Raymond Deshaies
- Scott Strobel
- Sonbinh T. Nguyen
- Sonny C. Lee
- Stacey Shane Bent
- Terence Hwa
- Tito A. Serafini
- Weihong Tan
- Yian Shi

== 1996 ==
- Chen-Ming Fan
- Erin Schulman
- Gang-Yu Liu
- Jennifer A. Doudna
- Karl T. Mueller
- Klaus Schmidt-Rohr
- Leemor Joshua-Tor
- Lucio Frydman
- Ronald Breaker
- Roya Maboudian
- Scott Reid
- Shuming Nie
- Stephen J. Kron
- Susan R. Wente
- William Schafer
- Yi Lu

== 1995 ==
- Arthur Palmer
- David Baker
- Frederick M. Hughson
- Jefferson Foote
- Lawrence R. Sita
- Lizbeth Hedstrom
- Marcos Dantus
- Melissa Hines
- Michael J. Mahan
- Michael L. Nonet
- Nancy Allbritton
- Nikola P. Pavletich
- Paul E. Laibinis
- Susan Marqusee

== 1994 ==
- Alcino Silva
- Anna Marie Pyle
- David M. Ornitz
- James D. Marks
- James S. Nowick
- Laura L. Kiessling
- Michael J. Natan
- Norbert Scherer
- Raymond C. Stevens
- Robert T. Kennedy
- Seung Koo Shin
- Yves Rubin

== 1993 ==
- Arlene Sharpe
- David C. Schwartz
- David W. Piston
- Erick M. Carreira
- Jeffrey Field
- John H. Griffin
- Jonathan Ellman
- Luping Yu
- Michael H. Hecht
- Michael J. Sailor
- Nancy Makri
- Reginald M. Penner
- Sheila S. David
- Teresa R. Strecker

== 1992 ==
- A. J. Shaka
- Chad A. Mirkin
- David A. Horne
- Eric T. Kool
- Evan R. Williams
- Jose N. Onuchic
- Leslie Bell
- Martin Yanofsky
- Michael J. Therien
- Patricia A. Bianconi
- Philip A. Anfinrud
- Robert M. Weis

== 1991 ==
- Curtis A. Monnig
- David A. Laude
- Douglas Koshland
- Frederick Cross
- Kathy L. Rowlen
- Maria Jasin
- Mercouri G. Kanatzidis
- Michelle Hanna
- Nancy Carrasco
- Reza Ghadiri
- Ron Frostig
- Sharon L. Neal
