= Robert A. Welch Foundation =

Non-profit foundation for chemistry research

The Welch Foundation, based in Houston, Texas, is one of the United States' oldest and largest private funding sources for chemistry researchers. It is a non-profit organization named for Robert Alonzo Welch, an industrialist who provided the funds to set up the foundation, along with research grants, endowments, and funding for chemical research. Since its founding in 1954, the organization has contributed to the advancement of chemistry through research grants, departmental grant programs, endowed chairs, and other special projects at educational institutions in Texas. The foundation hosts an annual chemical research conference in Houston that attracts chemists from around the globe and also sponsors The Welch Award in Chemistry as well as the Norman Hackerman Award in Chemical Research.

== Grants, scholarships, endowments, and awards ==
- The Welch Award in Chemistry, currently a $500,000 award, which recognizes the value of chemical research contributions for the benefit of humankind.
- The Norman Hackerman award in chemical research, currently a $100,000 award, which recognizes the work of young researchers in Texas.
- Research Grants support fundamental chemical research at universities, colleges, or other educational institutions within the state of Texas.
- Departmental Grants support chemical research by members of the chemistry department faculty at educational institutions in Texas.
- Endowed Chairs provide a faculty position for an eminent scientist. To be considered for an endowed chair, a Texas education institution must have a Ph.D. program in chemistry.
- Catalyst for Discovery Program Grants is intended to accelerate progress in fundamental chemical research by supporting research teams in Texas aimed at significant problems at the leading edge of chemistry. Annually, two grants of up to five million dollars ($5,000,000.00) each will be awarded to highly meritorious proposals.
- The Postdoctoral Fellows Grant Program provides three-year fellowships to recent PhD graduates from around the world to support the development of their chemical research careers in Texas. The aim is to fund fellows who intend to tackle important problems in chemistry in interesting and novel ways in laboratories that provide world-class training.
- The Welch eXperimental (WelchX) Collaboration Retreats aims to bring together Texas researchers to topically focused chemistry meetings and stimulate them to ideate on challenging issues of our time. Early-to mid-career tenured faculty will be invited to this fully in-person summer meeting to stimulate collaborations that foster lasting connections among the participants, thus increasing the density of research ties across Texas and spurring the growth of basic research in the chemical sciences.

== Welch Award in Chemistry ==
Year	Recipient
1972	Karl August Folkers, The University of Texas at Austin
1974	Albert Eschenmoser, Swiss Federal Institute of Technology
1976	Neil Bartlett, University of California, Berkeley
1978	Edgar Bright Wilson, Harvard University
1980	Sune Bergström, Karolinska Institute
1981	Paul Doughty Bartlett, Texas Christian University
1982	Frank Westheimer, Harvard University
1983	Henry Taube, Stanford University
1984	Kenneth Pitzer, University of California, Berkeley
1985	Duilio Arigoni, Swiss Federal Institute of Technology
1986	George C. Pimentel, University of California, Berkeley
1987	Harry George Drickamer, University of Illinois at Urbana-Champaign
1988	Richard Barry Bernstein, University of California, Los Angeles
1989	Norman R. Davidson, California Institute of Technology
1990	John D. Roberts, California Institute of Technology
1990	William von Eggers Doering, Harvard University
1991	Earl R. Stadtman, National Institutes of Health
1991	Edwin G. Krebs, Howard Hughes Medical Institute, University of Washington
1992	Richard Smalley, Rice University
1993	Gilbert Stork, Columbia University
1994	Jack Halpern, The University of Chicago
1994	F. Albert Cotton, Texas A&M University
1995	Jeremy R. Knowles, Harvard University
1995	Robert H. Abeles, Brandeis University
1996	Koji Nakanishi, Columbia University
1997	Ahmed Zewail, California Institute of Technology
1998	Pierre Chambon, College de France
1999	Richard Zare, Stanford University
2000	A. Ian Scott, Texas A&M University
2000	Sir Alan R. Battersby, Cambridge University
2001	Roger D. Kornberg, Stanford University
2002	Harden M. McConnell, Stanford University
2003	Ronald Breslow, Columbia University
2004	Allen J. Bard, The University of Texas at Austin
2005	George M. Whitesides, Harvard University
2006	Daniel E. Koshland, Jr., University of California, Berkeley
2007	William H. Miller, University of California, Berkeley
2007	Noel S. Hush, University of Sydney
2008	Alexander Rich, Massachusetts Institute of Technology
2009	Harry B. Gray, California Institute of Technology
2010	JoAnne Stubbe, Massachusetts Institute of Technology Christopher T. Walsh, Harvard Medical School
2011	John S. Waugh, Massachusetts Institute of Technology
2012	David A. Evans, Harvard University
2013	Louis E. Brus, Columbia University
2014	Robert G. Bergman, University of California, Berkeley
2015	Stephen C. Harrison, Harvard Medical School
2016	Richard H. Holm, Harvard University Stephen J. Lippard, Massachusetts Institute of Technology
2017	John B. Goodenough, University of Texas at Austin
2018	Adriaan Bax, National Institute of Diabetes and Digestive and Kidney Diseases
2019	Armand Paul Alivisatos, University of California Berkeley Charles M. Lieber, Harvard University
2020	Steven L. McKnight, The University of Texas Southwestern Medical Center
2021	Chi-Huey Wong, The Scripps Research Institute
2022	Carolyn R. Bertozzi, Stanford University
2023	Jacqueline Barton, California Institute of Technology
2024	Eric N. Jacobsen, Harvard University
2025	Stuart L. Schreiber, Harvard University Peter G. Schultz, Scripps Research
2026	Robert S. Langer, Massachusetts Institute of Technology

== Norman Hackerman Award in Chemical Research Recipients ==
Year	Recipient
2002	Andrew R. Barron, Rice University
2003	Xiaodong Wang, The University of Texas Southwestern Medical Center
2004	Jianpeng Ma, Baylor College of Medicine and Rice University
2005	Zhijian "James" Chen, The University of Texas Southwestern Medical Center
2006	Paul S. Cremer, Texas A&M University
2007	Patrick G. Harran, The University of Texas Southwestern Medical Center
2008	Francis T.F. Tsai, Baylor College of Medicine
2009	Cecilia Clementi, Rice University
2010	Kim Orth, The University of Texas Southwestern Medical Center
2011	Jason H. Hafner, Rice University
2012	Oleg V. Ozerov, Texas A&M University
2013	Olafs Daugulis, University of Houston
2014	Benjamin P. Tu, The University of Texas Southwestern Medical Center
2015	Stephan Link, Rice University
2016	Christopher J. Ellison, The University of Texas at Austin
2017	Neal M. Alto, The University of Texas Southwestern Medical Center
2017	Delia J. Milliron, The University of Texas at Austin
2018	Jeffrey D. Rimer, University of Houston
2019	Uttam K. Tambar, The University of Texas Southwestern Medical Center
2020	Vincent S. Tagliabracci, The University of Texas Southwestern Medical Center
2021	Ilya J. Finkelstein, The University of Texas at Austin
2022	Guihua Yu, The University of Texas at Austin
2022	Ryan Hibbs, The University of Texas Southwestern Medical Center
2023	Jason S. McLellan, The University of Texas at Austin
2024	Livia Schiavinato Eberlin, Baylor College of Medicine
2025	Haotian Wang, Rice University
2026	Sheel Dodani, The University of Texas at Dallas
