= Joseph Sambrook =

British molecular biologist (1939–2019)

- Born: 1 March 1939; Liverpool, England
- Died: 14 June 2019 (aged 80); Melbourne, Australia
- Education: Australian National University
- Known for: Laboratory manual Molecular Cloning, work on oncoviruses
- Awards: Victorian Government Leadership and Innovation Award
- Scientific career
- Fields: Molecular biology
- Workplaces: MRC Laboratory of Molecular Biology, Salk Institute for Biological Studies, Cold Spring Harbor Laboratory, University of Texas Southwestern Medical Center, Peter MacCallum Cancer Centre
- Doctoral students: Kim Orth

Joseph Frank Sambrook (1 March 1939 – 14 June 2019) was a British molecular biologist known for his studies of DNA oncoviruses and the molecular biology of normal and cancerous cells.

== Education and early career ==
Sambrook was educated at the University of Liverpool (BSc (hons) 1962) and obtained his PhD at the Australian National University in 1966. He did postdoctoral research at the MRC Laboratory of Molecular Biology (1966–67) and the Salk Institute for Biological Studies (1967–69). In 1969 he was hired by James D. Watson to work at the Cold Spring Harbor Laboratory in New York. Watson has been reported to say this was the best hiring decision he ever made. Joe was responsible for creating a combative creative environment at CSHL that fomented discovery. Subsequently, he worked at the University of Texas Southwestern Medical Center (Dallas).

== Achievements ==
Sambrook is best known for his studies on DNA tumor viruses and the molecular biology of normal and neoplastic cells. His Tumour Virus Group at Cold Spring Harbor identified and mapped all of the major genes of adenoviruses and SV40, determined their transcriptional control in infected and transformed cells, and elucidated the mechanism of integration of these viruses into the genome of the host cell. He has also made important contributions to the understanding of intracellular traffic and protein folding and is an influential leader in the field of the molecular genetics of human cancer.

Sambrook is a former director of research at the Peter MacCallum Cancer Centre in Melbourne. He was elected a Fellow of the Australian Academy of Science in 2000. and is a Fellow of the Royal Society. He was the founder and director of the Kathleen Cunningham Consortium for research into familial breast cancer, KConFab, that was established in 1995.

Sambrook has published four editions of the best-selling, highly influential laboratory manual Molecular Cloning, the third in 2001 with David Russell and the fourth in 2012 with Michael R. Green. He is also co-editor of Inspiring Science: Jim Watson and the Age of DNA and Life Illuminated: Selected Papers from Cold Spring Harbor Volume 2, 1972–1994. All three books were published by Cold Spring Harbor Laboratory Press.

In 2009 he was awarded the "Victorian Government Leadership and Innovation Award".

== Personal life ==
Sambrook had three children from his first marriage to Thelma, and a daughter with his second wife, Professor Mary-Jane Gething.
