= Jeff Chang =

Jeff Chang may refer to:

- Jeff Chang (journalist), American music journalist
- Jeff Chang (singer) (born 1967), Taiwanese singer

== See also ==
- Geoffrey Chang, American biologist
- Jeff Chan (disambiguation)
