= Jeff Chan =

Jeff Chan or Jeffrey Chan may refer to:

- Jeff Chan (basketball) (born 1983), Filipino basketball player
- Jeff Chan (saxophonist) (born 1970), American saxophonist
- Jeffery Paul Chan (1942–2022), American author and scholar

== See also ==
- Jeff Chang (disambiguation)
