= Brent Stockwell =

American biochemist

- Born: Bay Terrace, Queens, New York, US
- Known for: discovering Ferroptosis
- Spouse: Melissa Stockwell (m. 2000)
- Awards: Beckman Young Investigators Award

Academic background
- Education: AB, chemistry and economics, Cornell University; PhD, 1999, Harvard University
- Thesis: Forward and reverse chemical genetic studies of transforming growth factor beta signaling (1999)
- Website: stockwelllab.org

Brent Roark Stockwell is an American chemical biologist. He is a Professor of Biological Sciences and Chemistry at Columbia University. In 2012, Stockwell and Scott Dixon discovered ferroptosis and described several of its key features.

== Early life and education ==
Stockwell was born in Bay Terrace, New York and attended Hunter College High School. He received his undergraduate degree in chemistry and economics from Cornell University and his Ph.D. in chemistry at Harvard University. While completing his doctorate degree, Stockwell worked in the laboratory of Stuart Schreiber where he spent eighteen months unsuccessfully investigating a molecule that could shut down the protein TGF-beta. He eventually used naturally occurring molecules to block the effects of TGF-beta, resulting in the discovery that synthetic molecules were unlikely to be successful drug candidates. As a result of his research, Stockwell founded CombinatoRx to develop combinations of FDA-approved drugs to fight disease.

Following his PhD, Stockwell was appointed as a Whitehead Fellow at the Whitehead Institute, where he worked on synthetic lethal screens and cell death. In 2003, he developed the first library of biologically annotated compounds and approved drugs to capture the information underlying cellular mechanisms to give scientists greater and more immediate insight into cell biology mechanisms. He also began a campaign to identify compounds that selectively kill engineered tumor cells, identifying and naming the novel compound erastin.

== Career ==
Upon completing his fellowship, Stockwell joined the faculty at Columbia University as an assistant professor of biological sciences and of chemistry. Early into his tenure at the institution, Stockwell found two new compounds, RSL3 and RSL5, that could kill tumor cells. In order to find drug candidates that could selectively kill tumor cells, Stockwell used cells engineered with a cancer-causing mutation and identical cells lacking the mutation. As a result of his research into undiscovered mechanisms controlling cell death, Stockwell received a 2007 Beckman Young Investigators Award and was named a 2009 Howard Hughes Medical Institute Early Career Scientist. Following this, he was one of six winners of the BioAccelerate NYC Prize to conduct late-stage, "proof-of-concept" research on a new class of drugs to treat cancer in a more selective and non-toxic way.

In 2011, Stockwell published his first book entitled The Quest for the Cure: The Science and Stories Behind the Next Generation of Medicine. Later, using erastin, Stockwell discovered the process of ferroptosis, coined the term ferroptosis, described its key mechanisms, and developed the first chemical probes to control ferroptosis. In 2014, he received one of 10 recipients of the 2014 Lenfest Distinguished Teaching Awards.

During the COVID-19 pandemic, Stockwell co-published Lead compounds for the development of SARS-CoV-2 3CL protease inhibitors through the journal Nature Communications. He was also recognized by City & State as one of the inaugural Life Sciences Power 50 amongst scientists, entrepreneurs and investors. Later in November, Stockwell was again listed by Clarivate as one of the Highly Cited Researchers of the Year.

In 2023, Stockwell was elected to the National Academy of Medicine.

== Selected publications ==
- The Quest for the Cure: The Science and Stories Behind the Next Generation of Medicine (2011)

== Personal life ==
Stockwell is married to Melissa, an Associate Professor of Pediatrics and Population and Family Health at Columbia. Stockwell has two sons.
