= Sheila Nirenberg =

American neuroscientist

- Education: SUNY Albany; Harvard University
- Awards: MacArthur Award, Beckman Young Investigators Award, TED Talk, NYC BioAccelerate Prize
- Scientific career
- Fields: Neuroscience
- Workplaces: Cornell University
- Website: physiology.med.cornell.edu/faculty/nirenberg/lab/

External videos
- ”Sheila Nirenberg, Can we speak the language of the brain?”, TEDMED, 2011
- “Sheila Nirenberg - Q&A”, TEDMED, 2011
- ”MacArthur Fellows Program, Sheila Nirenberg”, MacArthur Foundation, 2013

Sheila Nirenberg is an American neuroscientist and professor at Weill Cornell Medical College. She works in the field of neural coding, developing new kinds of prosthetic devices that can communicate directly with the brain, and new kinds of smart robots. She is a recipient of a MacArthur “genius” award and has been the subject of, or featured in, several documentaries for her technology for treating blindness.

She is currently the Nanette Laitman Professor in Neurology and Neuroscience and a professor of Computational Neuroscience in the Institute for Computational Biomedicine at the Weill Medical College of Cornell University. Additionally, she is the founder of two startup companies, Bionic Sight LLC (prosthetic devices) and Nirenberg Neuroscience LLC (smart robots, AI).

== Early life and education ==
Nirenberg grew up in Westchester, New York, United States. She obtained her bachelor's degree from the State University of New York at Albany and her doctorate from Harvard Medical School. She worked with Constance Cepko, a neurobiologist who was studying development and degeneration of the vertebrate retina. Nirenberg's project focused on developing a new technique to eliminate specific interneuron cell types in order to understand fundamentally how neural circuits work.

== Research career ==
Nirenberg stayed at Harvard University for her postdoctoral work, working in computational neuroscience, then joined the faculty in the Department of Neurobiology at the University of California, Los Angeles (UCLA). She was then recruited to Cornell Medical School (Weill Cornell Medicine), where she is now a full professor A few years later, she was able to decipher the retina's neural code This discovery allowed her to develop a new treatment for blindness. The treatment bypasses damaged retinal cells and directly communicates visual information through the optic nerve to the brain. Nirenberg has published her research in journals such as Nature, PNAS, Neuron, and PLoS One. Her company, Bionic Sight, LLC (https://www.bionicsightllc.com/) is currently running a clinical trial to bring the treatment forward to blind patients (ClinicalTrials.gov identifier: NCT04278131).

== Awards and honors ==
- Bressler Prize, 2022 for Outstanding Accomplishments in Vision Science
- Barbara McClintock Women Innovator Award, 2022
- Crain's Notable Women in Tech, 2019
- MacArthur Award, 2013
- Beckman Young Investigators Award
- Klingenstein Fellowship, 1998
- Frontiers of Science Award
- Stein Oppenheimer Award
