= Jonathan Wilker =

Jonathan Wilker, Ph.D.
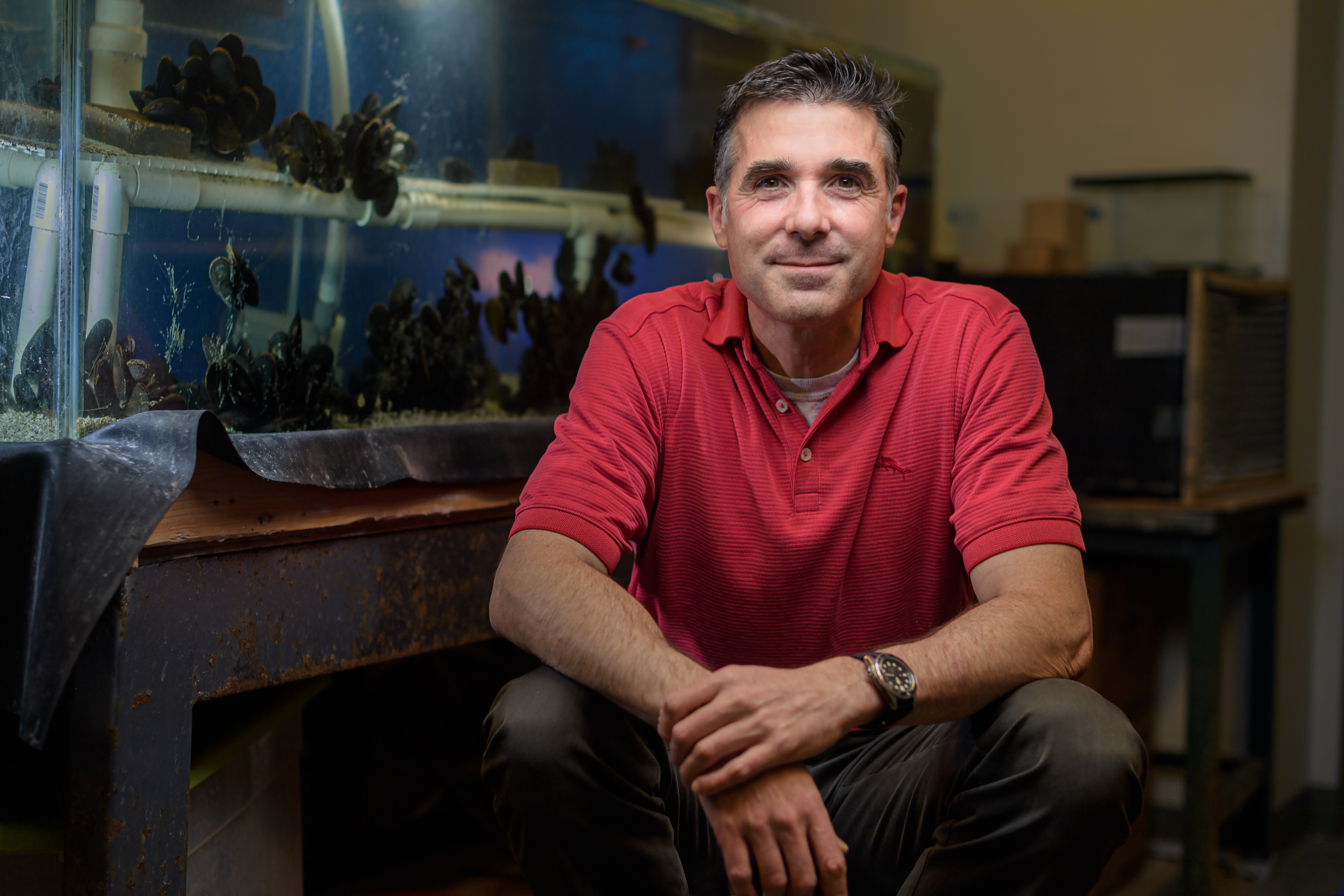
- Jonathan Wilker
- Education: University of Massachusetts, Amherst, Massachusetts Institute of Technology, California Institute of Technology
- Occupations: Professor of Chemistry, Purdue University, Professor of Materials Engineering, Purdue University, Lead Scientist, Mussel Polymers
- Awards: Beckman Young Investigators Award
- Website: https://www.chem.purdue.edu/wilker/

Jonathan Wilker is an American scientist, engineer, and educator who focuses on developing sustainable, marine animal-inspired underwater adhesives for use in surgery, construction, and other applications. His work has been profiled by The New York Times, National Public Radio, Popular Science, Chemical and Engineering News, and his research has been published in many scientific journals, such as Nature, Journal of the American Chemical Society, and ACS Applied Materials & Interfaces. He is a professor at Purdue University in West Lafayette, Indiana, where he teaches courses in inorganic chemistry and bioinorganic chemistry. Wilker has received a number of awards for his teaching including The College of Science Outstanding Teacher Award at Purdue University (2011). In addition to being a faculty member in the Department of Chemistry, he is also a Professor of Materials Engineering at Purdue University. Outside activities include advocacy for federal funding of science research and development.

== Education ==
Wilker grew up in the Boston area. He has said that, when younger, visiting beaches with his parents and, when older, scuba diving have influenced the research pursued in his laboratory. As an undergraduate, Wilker studied chemistry at the University of Massachusetts, Amherst. He was a graduate student at the Massachusetts Institute of Technology in chemistry, working under Stephen Lippard. After graduation he worked at the California Institute of Technology as a postdoctoral scholar in the laboratory of Harry Gray. In 1999 he joined Purdue University to start his own research laboratory.

== Research & Career ==
Wilker's current research focus includes biomaterials, underwater adhesives, sustainability, polymer synthesis, biomimetic materials, marine biology, bioinorganic materials, sealants, coatings, hydrogels, and material characterization. His research group is working to understand how animals adhere to surfaces in the wet marine environment. Much of this work has been with mussels and oysters. Key findings include observations indicating that mussels use iron to cure their protein-based adhesive. Oysters have been shown to produce a cement with chemistry quite different from that of mussels.

Another aspect of Wilker’s research program is in biomimicry. He is using information learned from marine biology to make new adhesive materials. Of note is development of a polymer adhesive that can bond more strongly than commercial Super Glue. Their laboratory has also made what may be the strongest known adhesive for bonding underwater.

Wilker is also working in applications development, in particular using biomimetic materials to develop new adhesives for general use as well as, specifically, for surgeries. One challenge in replacing biomedical sutures and screws is obtaining adhesives that can set in the wet environment of the body.

Wilker has won numerous awards for his research including the PopTech Science Fellowship (2013), the Alfred P. Sloan Foundation Research Fellowship (2002), the Beckman Young Investigators Award (2001), and the National Science Foundation Faculty Early Career Development (CAREER) Award (2001). Wilker has spoken about his research at PopTech (2013) and TEDx Purdue (2018).

In 2019, Wilker and his team launched the company Mussel Polymers Inc, where he acts as Lead Scientist. Mussel Polymers is focused on developing adhesives in the form of poly(catechol-styrene) (PCS), which Wilker and his research team invented at Purdue University.

In 2024, Wilker was noted as an important scientist in sustainability and climate change in the Grist 50 list.
