= Gordana Dukovic =

American physical chemist

Gordana Dukovic is a physical chemist. She is currently a professor in the Department of Chemistry at the University of Colorado Boulder.

== Life and education ==
Gordana Dukovic earned her B.A. at Rutgers University in 2001, majoring in chemistry and minoring in Italian. In her PhD studies, she did research at Columbia University on the spectroscopy of carbon nanotubes with Louis Brus as her advisor. She was awarded a PhD in chemistry with distinction in 2006 for her thesis entitled "Electronic spectra of carbon nanotubes: excitonic states, chemical doping, and chiral interactions." After her PhD, Dukovic did her postdoctoral research on nanoscience and photochemistry with Paul Alivisatos at the University of California, Berkeley.

In 2009, Dukovic became faculty as an assistant professor of chemistry in the Department of Chemistry at the University of Colorado Boulder, where her research group uses nanoscale synthesis and ultrafast spectroscopy to study fundamental problems in nanoscience and how they impact the application of nanoscale materials to solar energy harvesting. In 2016 she was granted tenure to become an associate professor of chemistry.

Her research has been cited over 5900 times.

== Honors and awards ==
Gordana Dukovic has received the following awards:

- 2017 Faculty Fellow, Research and Innovation Office, University of Colorado Boulder
- 2016 Fellow, Renewable and Sustainable Energy Institute
- 2016 Visiting Professor, Claude Bernard University, Lyon, France
- 2015 Provost's Faculty Achievement Award, University of Colorado Boulder
- 2014 Sloan Research Fellow
- 2013 Beckman Young Investigator
- 2013 Cottrell Scholar
- 2012 NSF CAREER Award
- 2012 Scialog Collaborative Innovation Award (with Sean Elliott, Boston University)
- 2012 Fellow, Materials Science and Engineering Program, University of Colorado Boulder
- 2011 ACS PRF Doctoral New Investigator Award
- 2010 Renewable and Sustainable Energy Institute (RASEI) Affiliate
- 2006 Hammet Award, for excellence in studies and research toward the PhD, Columbia University
- 2003 Jack Miller Award, for excellence in teaching, Columbia University
- 2002 Edith and Eugene Blout Scholarship, Columbia University
