= Jason Shear =

American chemist (born 1967)

Jason B. Shear
- Born: February 28, 1967 (age 59); Buffalo, New York, U.S.
- Education: University of Texas at Austin, Stanford University
- Scientific career
- Fields: Biomedical optics, biophotonics, nanotechnology, analytical chemistry
- Workplaces: University of Texas at Austin; Stanford University; Cornell University; Rice University
- Doctoral advisors: Richard N. Zare, Richard H. Scheller, Watt W. Webb (postdoctoral), Thomas E. Mallouk (undergraduate)
- Website: jshear.cm.utexas.edu/jshear/

Jason Ben Shear (born February 28, 1967) is an American chemist and expert in biomaterials and bioengineering. He is currently Professor of Chemistry at the University of Texas at Austin. Shear has been considered one of the pioneers of two-photon photolithography.

== Scientific career ==
Shear received his BS in chemistry from UT Austin in 1989. He then moved to Stanford University to work with Richard Zare and completed his PhD in 1994. He was later an NSF Postdoctoral Fellow at Cornell University where he worked with Watt W. Webb in the laboratory that earlier developed the first two-photon excitation microscopy instrument. Shear returned to Austin to start his own independent lab at the University of Texas in 1996.

The Shear group has developed methods for performing solution-phase chemical separations on time frames more than 1000-fold shorter than previously accomplished, offering insights into reaction pathways of transient reaction products that are more easily characterized from their electrophoretic mobilities than from measurable spectroscopic properties. This method, based on photochemical preparation of reaction intermediates, enabled compounds to be electrophoretically probed using extremely large electric fields over distances as small as several micrometres on timescales as small as several microseconds.

The Shear group has also developed micro-3D-printing technologies for organizing cellular environments, a technology that allows cellular populations to be characterized under well-defined conditions and on scales in which ensemble behaviours begin to emerge. Of particular impact has been their use of these methods to probe bacterial group behaviours that underlie enhanced virulence, including quorum sensing and population-dependent antibiotic resistance.

Shear's lab further developed novel strategies for engineering functionality into 3D printed biomaterials to provide environmentally controlled volume/shape change, chemical capabilities, and electronic properties. He has pioneered high-sensitivity multiphoton-based sensing technologies for microanalyses, developing various strategies for characterizing picoliter-sized biological samples using capillary electrophoretic analysis. Using these methods, the group has demonstrated strategies for analyzing volumes commensurate with subcellular volumes for spectrally diverse native chromophores present in attomole to zeptomole quantities. His lab was involved in foundational work developing broad-based sensor array devices for analysis of various solution-phase sample types, ranging from measurements of bodily fluids such as saliva to the determination of small-molecule components in consumables.

== Awards ==
HHMI Predoctoral Fellow (1990-1994) • Office of Naval Research Young Investigator Award (1997) • Beckman Young Investigators Award (1997) • Searle Scholars Program Award, Kinship Foundation (1998) • National Science Foundation CAREER Award (1999) • Alfred P. Sloan Research Fellowship (1999) • Top 100 Young Innovator citation, MIT Technology Review (1999) • Noted for a “Chemical Development of the Year” by Chemical & Engineering News (2003) • Academy of Medicine, Engineering and Science of Texas protégé (2004, 2005) • American Chemical Society Arthur F. Findeis Award in Analytical Chemistry (2005) • Texas Instruments Visiting Professor in Bioengineering, Rice University (2010–11)

== Personal life ==
Jason's grandfather was Murray Shear, widely considered to be the Father of Chemotherapy. Jason's father David Shear was a professor of biophysics and held faculty appointments at SUNY Buffalo, the University of Georgia at Athens, and the University of Missouri at Columbia.
