= Heather C. Allen =

American chemist

- Education: University of California, Irvine
- Awards: Alexander von Humboldt Research Award
- Scientific career
- Fields: Interfacial phenomena
- Workplaces: Ohio State University
- Website: Allen Group

Heather Cecile Allen is a research chemist and Professor of Chemistry, who leads the Allen Group at The Ohio State University. Allen's research focuses on interfacial phenomena, particularly those involving water and air. Her work has broad application ranging from medicine to climate change. She also develops nonlinear optical spectroscopy and microscopy instruments for the examination of interfacial surfaces Allen has published more than 160 journal papers, and is reported to have an H-index of 58 as of August 2025. She has received a number of awards including the 2022 American Chemical Society Irving Langmuir Award in Chemical Physics, and in 2014 the Alexander von Humboldt Research Award. Allen's work on the structure of water was mentioned in Science magazine's list of the top ten breakthroughs of 2004.

== Education ==
Heather Allen enrolled at Saddleback College, a community college, as an adult student at age 28. Interested in environmental science, she won a Science Scholarship Foundation Fellowship, enabling her to transfer to the University of California, Irvine to earn a chemistry or chemical engineering degree. She received her B.S. degree in chemistry from the University of California, Irvine in 1993, working as a research assistant with Nobel Laureate Frank Sherwood Rowland and Donald R. Blake. She received her Ph.D. in physical chemistry in 1997, working with John C. Hemminger and Barbara J. Finlayson-Pitts. The topic of her Ph.D. thesis was Fundamental surface processes in heterogeneous atmospheric chemistry: Applications to sea-salt (NaCl) and oxide particulate chemistry. She received several awards and postdoctoral fellowships, and did postdoctoral work with Geraldine L. Richmond at the University of Oregon.

== Career ==
Heather Allen joined Ohio State University in 2000, as an assistant professor of environmental chemistry. She went on to become a full professor in the department of chemistry and biochemistry and in the department of pathology. She leads the Allen Group at Ohio State University.

=== Interfacial phenomena ===
Her research focuses on fundamental interfacial phenomena, the molecular organization and orientation at interfaces between gases and liquids, gases and solids, and liquids and solids. She is particularly interested in understanding the activities of ions and molecules in aqueous surface structures. Understanding molecular organization is essential to understanding the ways in which surfaces will react. Her studies of chemical reaction mechanisms have examined water, lipids, and fatty acids, among others.

Her work has relevance to a wide variety of fields, from medicine to climate change. Medically, aqueous surface structures are particularly relevant in the understanding of cell membranes and skin surfaces, which function as gateways to the cell and the body. As a Beckman Young Investigator, Allen studied the biophysics of the lung as a barrier mediating oxygen and carbon dioxide transport, and the importance of pulmonary surfactants. Air, lipids, and water are all involved at the surface of the lung. Molecules of the alveolar lining were found to be important in the efficiency with which the lung could function.

Allen has also examined the development of biomembranes with particular application to the detection of cancer margins. Her team is working on the development of infrared biomarkers and molecular level diagnostics for the use of cancer surgeons.

Allen's studies of interfacial phenomena are also relevant to geophysics, geochemistry and climate. Her work includes studies of how ions and minerals interact at surfaces where they are involved in corrosion and the interactions of pollutants with soil.

The effect of particles at surfaces is important in understanding the behavior of air and water at ocean surfaces, and the health of oceans. Recent research indicates that accumulated ions are present in the ocean's surface layers. Using highly accurate laser beams, researchers were able to see the structures formed by halogen ions, or halides, and surrounding molecules of water in the interfacial area. Halides such as iodide and bromide were found close to the surface, a result which challenged "conventional wisdom" on the subject. Chloride ions were found lower down. Iodide and bromide are unstable and tend to combine with other chemicals to form ozone. This means that fog and ocean spray are more chemically reactive than was previously believed by scientists. Allen's results may cause atmospheric chemists to revise their models of ozone activity and climate change.

The behavior of atmospheric aerosols, particulate matter suspended in the atmosphere, is also related to climate change. Heather Allen is part of a national multidisciplinary group of researchers involved in the Center for Aerosol Impacts on Climate and the Environment (CAICE) who study the effects of atmospheric aerosols. Allen studies the surfaces of cloud systems and their electric fields, to better understand thunderstorms, lightning strikes and the effects of microdroplets on clouds and fogs. With Lisa Van Loon, she has examined the behavior of sulfuric acid and methanol, found as aerosols in the upper atmosphere. Together they can form methyl sulfate, a compound that attracts water droplets and supports cloud formation. While sulfuric acid can reflect light and heat, clouds tend to trap light and heat in the atmosphere. The interplay between sulfuric acid and atmospheric temperature change is therefore more complex than originally thought.

“Aerosols are a major driver of climate change and have major impacts... their effect depends on their composition, size, surface properties, where they’re located in the environment—especially their inherent ability to scatter light, and clouds—all are variables.” Heather C. Allen

=== Instrumentation ===
Heather Allen and the Allen Group are involved in the design of nonlinear optical spectroscopy and microscopy instruments for scientific research. These include vibrational sum frequency generation (VSFG) spectroscopy, and broad-bandwidth sum frequency generation (BBSFG) spectroscopy, used for investigating gas-liquid and solid interfaces. Laser technology uses ultra-fast femtosecond and picosecond laser pulses to examine molecular-level interfaces and observe the orientation and structure of the chemical species within the surface regime, the surface signature. Other techniques used and studied include polarized Raman and infrared spectroscopy techniques, Brewster angle microscopy, and differential optical absorption spectroscopy.

== Awards ==
- 1996 Hertz Fellow, Fannie from John Hertz Foundation Graduate Fellowship
- 2001, Research Innovation Award from Research Corporation
- 2002, NSF CAREER Award
- 2003, Beckman Young Investigators Award
- 2005, Alfred P. Sloan Research Fellowship
- 2006, Camille Dreyfus Teacher-Scholar Award
- 2012, Fellow of the American Association for the Advancement of Science (AAAS)
- 2013, ACS Award for Encouraging Women into Careers in the Chemical Sciences, supported by The Camille and Henry Dreyfus Foundation
- 2014, Alexander von Humboldt Research Award (Germany)
- 2015, University Distinguished Scholar Awards, Ohio State University
- 2017, Alumna of the Year Award, Saddleback Community College, California
- 2022, American Chemical Society (ACS) Irving Langmuir Award in Chemical Physics
