= Raymond Schaak =

Raymond E. Schaak
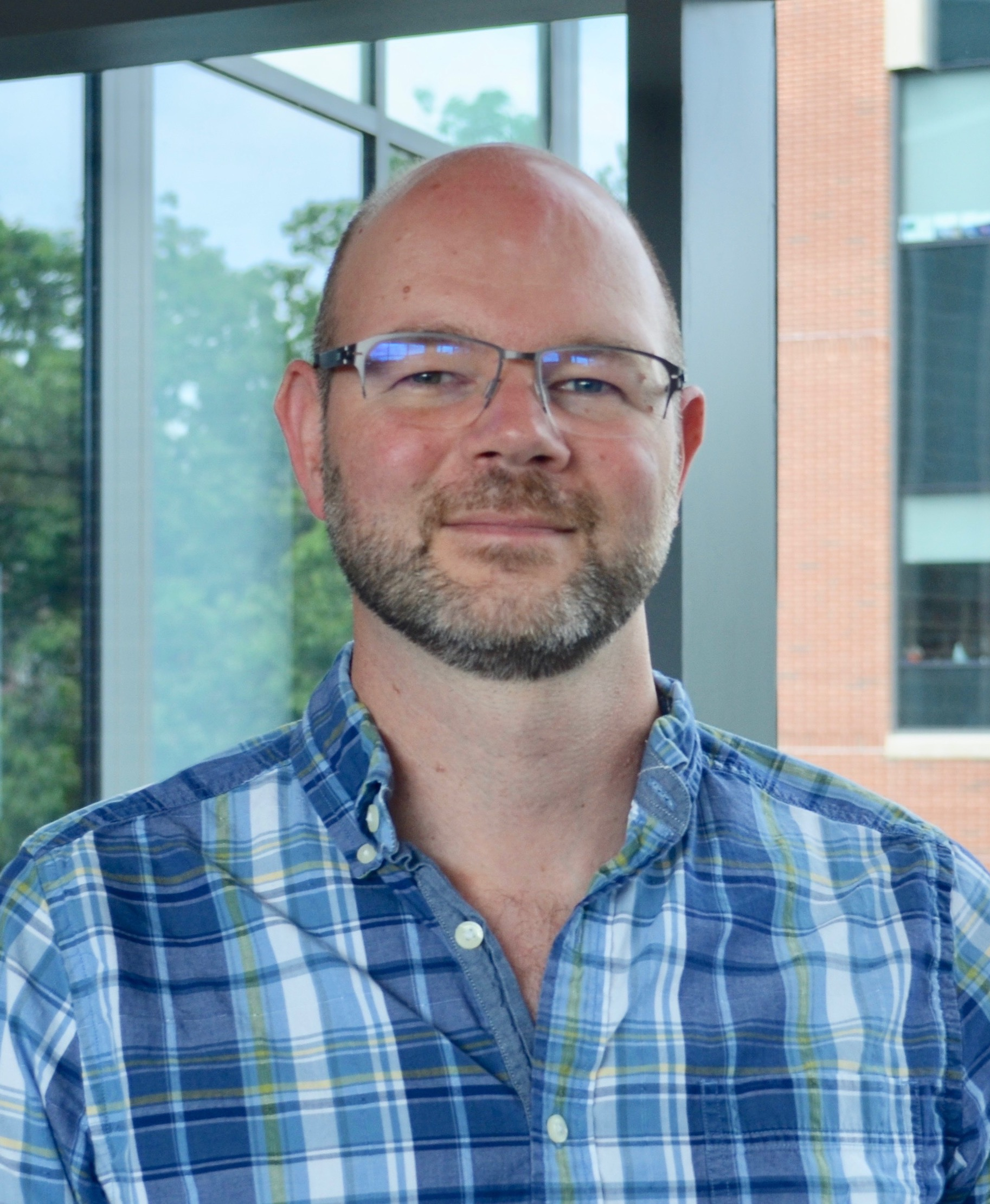
- Education: Lebanon Valley College, Pennsylvania State University
- Awards: National Science Foundation (NSF) CAREER Award (2006); Beckman Young Investigator Award (2006); DuPont Young Professor (2006); Camille Dreyfus Teacher-Scholar (2007); Alfred P. Sloan Research Fellow (2007) the National Fresenius Award (2011); Penn State Faculty Scholar Medal for the Department of Physical Sciences (2012); American Chemical Society (ACS) Inorganic Nanoscience Award (2016); Fellow of the American Association for the Advancement of Science (2017); The Cotton Award (2025)
- Scientific career
- Fields: inorganic nanochemistry
- Workplaces: Texas A&M University, Pennsylvania State University

Raymond E. Schaak is an American chemist and currently a DuPont Professor of Materials and Chemistry at Penn State University. He assumed his position at Penn State in 2007. Prior to this, he was an assistant professor of chemistry at Texas A&M University since 2003. In 2017 he was named a fellow for the American Association for the Advancement of Science.

== Background ==
Raymond Schaak’s research interests primarily lie in the area of synthetic inorganic nanochemistry. His group has made important contributions to the development of a retrosynthetic design of solids and the synthesis of nanoparticles. His interests also include the understanding of chemical reactions that occur with nanoparticles and their formation pathways. Raymond Schaak describes himself as an introvert who masks as an extrovert. Raymond Schaak is also passionate about finding ways to convert catalytic materials that are largely available on earth for energy applications.

== Education ==
Raymond Schaak decided to study chemistry in college because in high school he enjoyed applying math to solve everyday life issues and performing experiments. He began his chemistry research career when he earned his undergraduate degree in chemistry from Lebanon Valley College, then received his Ph. D. from Pennsylvania State University in 2001.

== Career ==
Raymond Schaak worked on as a postdoctoral researcher with Robert Cava at the department of chemistry at Princeton University from 2001-2003. He then began his independent career at Texas A&M as an assistant professor. If he had not become a chemist, he would have become an architect, graphic designer, or photographer.

== Publications ==
=== Research on Nanostructured Nickel Phosphide ===
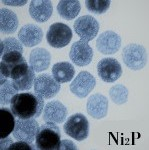

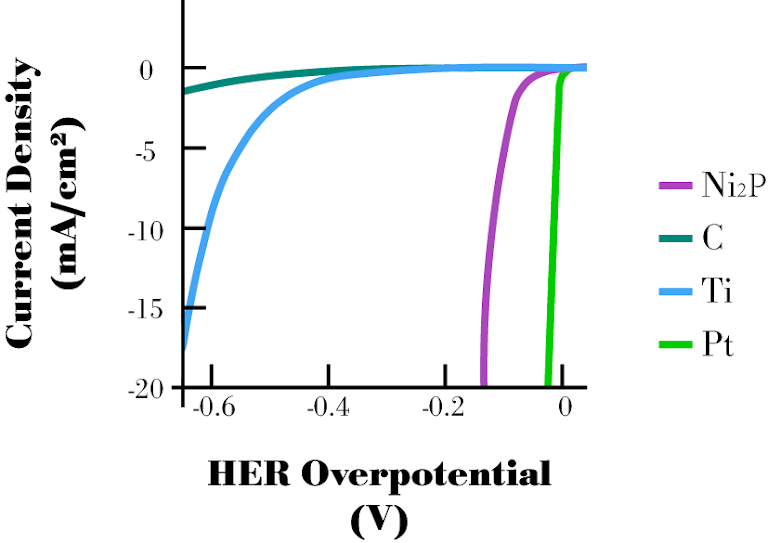

The publication, “Nanostructured Nickel Phosphide as an Electrocatalyst for the Hydrogen Evolution Reaction”, explained electrocatalytic activity and stability of nanostructured nickel phosphide (Ni2P) for the hydrogen evolution reaction (HER) in acidic solutions. Schaak and co-workers also proposed that other known hydrodesulfurization (HDS) catalysts could be candidates of HER electrocatalyst since Ni2P is originally only known as an HDS catalyst.

=== Other Discoveries ===
Schaak’s other achievements include research on cobalt phosphide (CoP) nanoparticles, study about a general strategy for synthesizing transition metal phosphides and study on a one-pot synthetic strategy for accessing hollow CoPt nanospheres with a Co−Pt alloy structure.

== Awards and honors ==
Schaak has received numerous awards and honors for his work and contributions to the chemistry field. In 2006, he has received two awards the National Science Foundation (NSF) CAREER Award and Beckman Young Investigator Award, along with the DuPont Young Professor Grant. He received a teaching award in 2007, where he was recognized as a Camille Dreyfus Teacher-Scholar, and that same year he became an Alfred P. Sloan Research Fellow. In 2011 he was the recipient of the National Fresenius Award, and in 2012 he received the Penn State Faculty Scholar Medal for the Department of Physical Sciences. His most recent awards included the American Chemical Society (ACS) Inorganic Nanoscience Award in 2016, and in 2017 he was named a Fellow of the American Association for the Advancement of Science. Since 2017 Schaak has been serving as an associate editor of ACS Nano journal.
