= Claudia Turro =

American inorganic chemist

- Education: Michigan State University
- Scientific career
- Workplaces: The Ohio State University
- Thesis: A time-resolved study of electron transfer mechanisms: beyond outer-sphere electron transfer (1992)

Claudia Turro is an American inorganic chemist who is the Dow Professor of Chemistry at The Ohio State University (OSU). Since July 2019 she has been the Chair of the OSU Department of Chemistry and Biochemistry. She was elected Fellow of the American Chemical Society in 2010 and is a member of the American Academy of Arts and Sciences (2023) and the National Academy of Sciences (2024).

== Education ==
Claudia Turro earned her B.S. with Honors from Michigan State University in 1987. She completed her Ph.D. in 1992 at the same institution, where she collaborated with Daniel G. Nocera and George E. Leroi. Following this, she was awarded a Jane Coffin Childs Memorial Fund for Medical Research Postdoctoral Fellowship, which allowed her to conduct postdoctoral research at Columbia University with Nicholas J. Turro (no relation) from 1992 to 1995.

== Research and career ==
Turro joined the faculty of The Ohio State University in 1996. She and her group study light-initiated reactions of metal complexes, with applications in photochemotherapy (PCT) and treatment of diseases, luminescent sensors, and solar energy conversion. They investigate the excited states of mononuclear and dinuclear transition metal complexes to enhance their reactivity. Their research focuses on controlling the dynamics of excited states, including photophysical properties and reactivity, such as energy transfer, charge separation, recombination, and photochemical reactions. This understanding is crucial for applications in solar energy, PCT, and sensing.

== Awards and honors ==
- 1998 Early CAREER Award by the National Science Foundation
- 1999 Arnold and Mabel Beckman Foundation Young Investigators Award
- 2010 Elected Fellow of the American Chemical Society
- 2012 Fellow of the American Association for the Advancement of Science
- 2014 Award in Photochemistry from the Inter-American Photochemical Society
- 2016 Recipient of Edward W. Morley Medal from the Cleveland section of the ACS
- 2023 Elected member of the American Academy of Arts and Sciences
- 2024 Elected member of the National Academy of Sciences
- 2026 Josef Michl ACS Award in Photochemistry from the American Chemical Society
- 2026 Named University Distinguished professor at The Ohio State University

== Selected publications ==
- Claudia Turro; Chi K. Chang; George E. Leroi; Robert I. Cukier; Daniel G. Nocera (May 1992). "Photoinduced electron transfer mediated by a hydrogen-bonded interface". Journal of the American Chemical Society. 114 (10): 4013–4015. doi:10.1021/ja00036a081. ISSN 0002-7863. Wikidata Q56519087.
- Jessica D. Knoll; Claudia Turro (1 January 2015). "Control and utilization of ruthenium and rhodium metal complex excited states for photoactivated cancer therapy". Coordination Chemistry Reviews. 282–283: 110–126. doi:10.1016/j.ccr.2014.05.018. ISSN 0010-8545. PMC 4343038. PMID 25729089. Wikidata Q35128594.
- Tyler J Whittemore; Agustin Millet; Hannah J Sayre; Congcong Xue; Brian S Dolinar; Eryn G White; Kimberly Renee Dunbar; Claudia Turro (4 April 2018). "Tunable Rh2(II,II) Light Absorbers as Excited-State Electron Donors and Acceptors Accessible with Red/Near-Infrared Irradiation". Journal of the American Chemical Society. 140 (15): 5161–5170. doi:10.1021/jacs.8b00599. ISSN 0002-7863. PMID 29617115. Wikidata Q52607774.
