= Anne McNeil =

American chemist (born 1977)

Anne J. McNeil
- Born: June 17, 1977 (age 49); Buffalo, New York, U.S.
- Education: College of William & Mary (BS); Cornell University (PhD)
- Scientific career
- Fields: Chemistry
- Workplaces: University of Michigan; Howard Hughes Medical Institute
- Doctoral advisor: David Collum
- Other academic advisors: Timothy M. Swager
- Website: mcneilgroup.chem.lsa.umich.edu

Anne J. McNeil (born June 17, 1977) is an American chemist who currently works at the University of Michigan, where she holds the position of Arthur F. Thurnau Professor of Chemistry and Macromolecular Science and Engineering. In 2017, McNeil was named a fellow of the American Association for the Advancement of Science (AAAS).

== Biography ==
McNeil is from Buffalo, New York. She graduated from the College of William & Mary in 1999 with a Bachelor of Science in chemistry. Her graduate work was with Dave Collum at Cornell University, studying the aggregation kinetics and chemistry of lithium amides and lithium enolates. After earning her PhD in chemistry in 2005, McNeil was a post-doc with Timothy M. Swager at MIT from 2005 to 2007, studying conjugated polymers. She now has two kids and a dog named

She joined the faculty of the University of Michigan in 2007 as an assistant professor of Chemistry and Macromolecular Science and Engineering. She became an Arthur F. Thurnau professor in September 2013, and a professor for the Howard Hughes Medical Institute in 2014.

== Scientific career ==
McNeil's lab at the University of Michigan is known for providing mechanistic understanding to the catalyst transfer polymerization process, helping to show that the likely intermediate is a catalyst-polymer π-complex, but the lab has a diverse focus.

For her work on conjugated polymers, there has been considerable focus on expanding the use of catalyst transfer polymerization to make polymers of novel or hard-to-reach architectures (such as conjugated gradient copolymers or insulating-conducting block copolymers) and for studying the properties of new conjugated polymers or new blends of known polymers in solar cells to improve their performance.

Another focus has been on molecular gelation; McNeil has published molecular gels as sensors of many harmful or hard to detect compounds. This is with the underlying assumption that it is easier to determine if a gel has formed (since it will go from a flowing solution to a gel that resists flow) rather than alternatives, such as if a solution has changed color (which can be difficult to discern if the analyte is strongly colored). McNeil's lab has produced gel-based sensors for mercury ions, nitrite ions, explosives, enzymes, and lead ions, which gel when the analyte is present. Many of the gels outperform current sensors for the same materials in sensitivity and in accuracy.

== Awards ==
McNeil was one of the first class of Beckman Scholars, receiving an award from the Arnold and Mabel Beckman Foundation in 1998. McNeil was also selected for a Beckman Young Investigators Award in 2009.
