= Stuart Licht =

American chemist

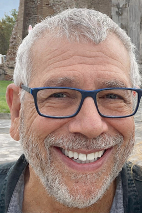
- Born: Stuart Lawrence Licht; 24 July 1954 (age 72); Boston, Massachusetts, U.S.
- Other name: Stuart Light
- Citizenship: USA
- Education: Wesleyan University (BS, MS); Weizmann Institute of Science (PhD)
- Known for: STEP process; CO_{2} conversion to nanocarbons; Molten-air batteries; Aluminium–sulfur battery; Super-iron batteries
- Spouse: Bregt Licht
- Children: 5
- Awards: Beckman Young Investigators Award (2005); Fellow of the Electrochemical Society (2018)
- Scientific career
- Fields: Electrochemistry; Solar energy; Climate mitigation technologies
- Workplaces: George Washington University; Clark University; Technion
- Thesis: (1985)

Stuart Lawrence Licht is an American chemist and academic. He is a Professor Emeritus of Chemistry at George Washington University (GWU). Licht's research focuses on carbon capture to mitigate climate change and the electrochemical conversion of carbon dioxide into nanocarbons and other useful society stables, as well as solar energy, battery chemistry, and physical/analytical chemistry.

His earlier works primarily focused on fundamental physical and analytical chemistry, high efficiency solar cells, and photo-electrochemistry. This included the use of cesium to increase solar cell voltage and solar cells that could store energy for night time use. Prof. Licht's focus expanded to include, electron transfer, batteries and fuel cells, including making the first practical aqueous sulfur batteries (overcoming sulfur inherited insulating properties), super iron batteries (based on iron molecules in a plus six oxidative state, which previously was thought impossible to stabilize), the assembling of micro-electrodes, vanadium diboride batteries and air batteries (redox of 11 or over 11 electrons per vanadium diboride molecule and has energy density over that of gasoline at times), and in 2013 the molten air battery.

After 2009, his work primarily shifted to focus on generating useful molecules, such as graphene nanocarbons (such as CNT, graphene, and CNOs), ammonia, iron, solar fuels such as sungas, and hydrogen using high temperature electrolysis where heat and electricity can come from either renewable or non-renewable energy. High temperature electrolysis per equations outlined in his STEP solar energy conversion process reduces the energy needed for electrolysis with higher efficiencies than that of a heat engine, and using available heat, exogenic reactions, concentrated reactants, and the use of high ionic activity electrolytes (molten salts) facilitates the predicted and observed highest levels of electrical to chemical energy and, separately solar and climate mitigation decarbonization conversion efficiencies.

== Early life and education ==
Licht was born in Boston, Massachusetts. He earned a Bachelor of Science degree in 1976 and a Master of Science in 1980 from Wesleyan University, where he conducted research in molecular quantum mechanics. He completed his Ph.D. in 1985 at the Weizmann Institute of Science in materials chemistry, with a focus on photoelectrochemical solar cells. From 1986 to 1988, he was a postdoctoral fellow at the Massachusetts Institute of Technology (MIT), where he studied, developed theory on, and experimented with microelectrode and chemical diffusion under the guidance of Mark S. Wrighton.

== Academic career ==
From 1988 to 1995, Licht held the Carlson Endowed Chair in Chemistry at Clark University. He subsequently served at the Technion – Israel Institute of Technology from 1995 to 2003, and then chaired the Department of Chemistry at the University of Massachusetts from 2003 to 2008. He also worked as a Program Director at the National Science Foundation. In 2008, he joined George Washington University, where he became Professor Emeritus of Chemistry in 2023.

He has chaired the New England Section of the American Chemical Society and is a Fellow of the Electrochemical Society, where he founded both the New England and Israel sections.

== Research ==
Licht's research is centered on developing carbon-negative technologies. His work on liquid solar solar cells pursued (1) discovery of the role of solution chemistry in the mechanism and enhancement of photoelectrochemical (semiconductors immersed in electrolytes) solar energy conversion, (2) development of a solar cell with built energy charge storage, (3) multi-bandgap photoelectrochemistry, (4) a light addressable sensor and (5) highest solar conversion efficiencies for solar water splitting to produce hydrogen.

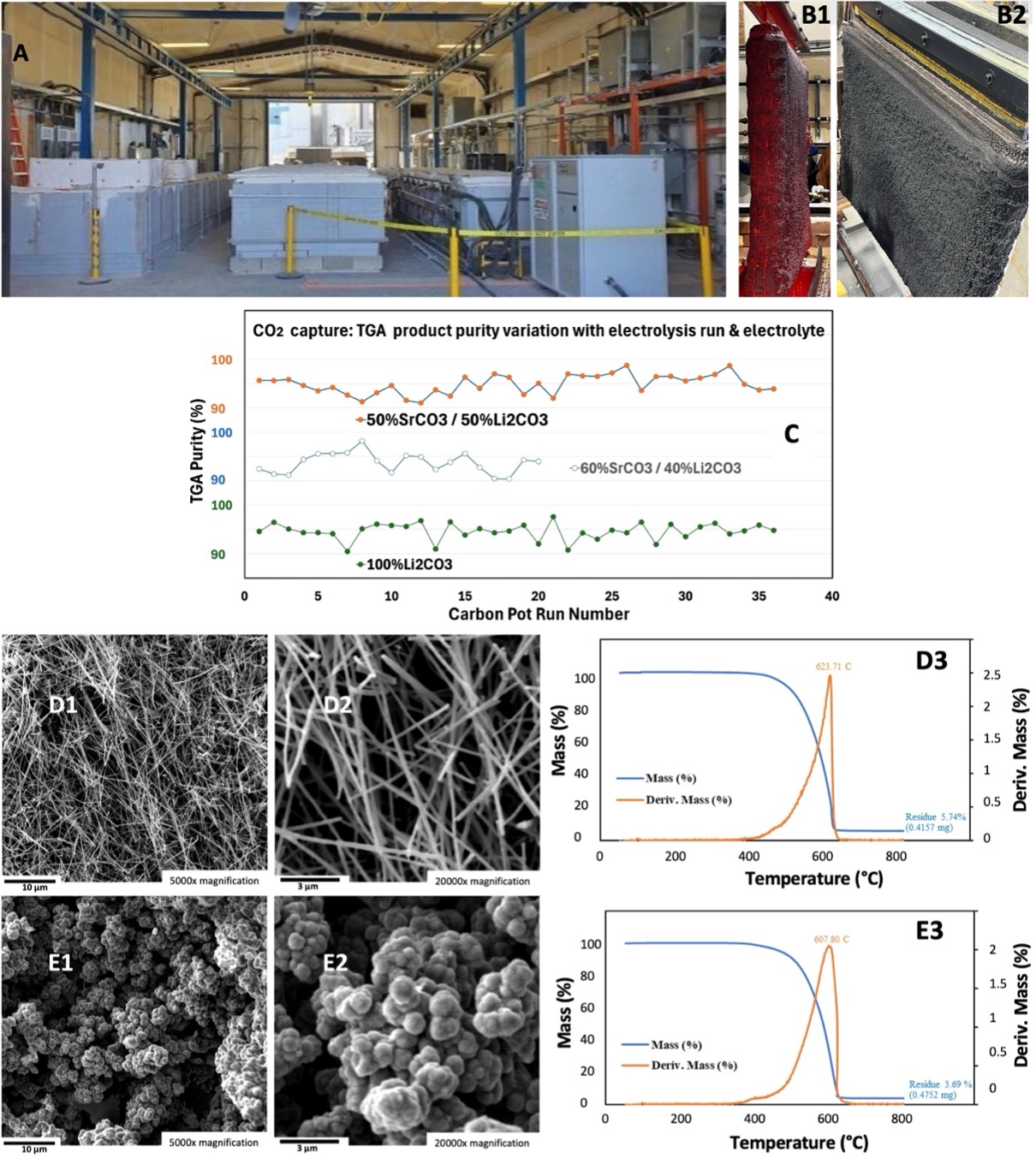
CO_{2} emitted from the Shepard 860 MW NG Power plant in Calgary, CA, using Stuart Licht Technology at his company, is directly converted to carbon nanotubes or carbon nano-onions at high purity by tuning the electrochemical conditions of the C2CNT process using the Genesis Device Modules. Both pure lithium carbonate and strontium/lithium carbonate was used in this technology, with mixed electrolyte being much cheaper and developed later on.

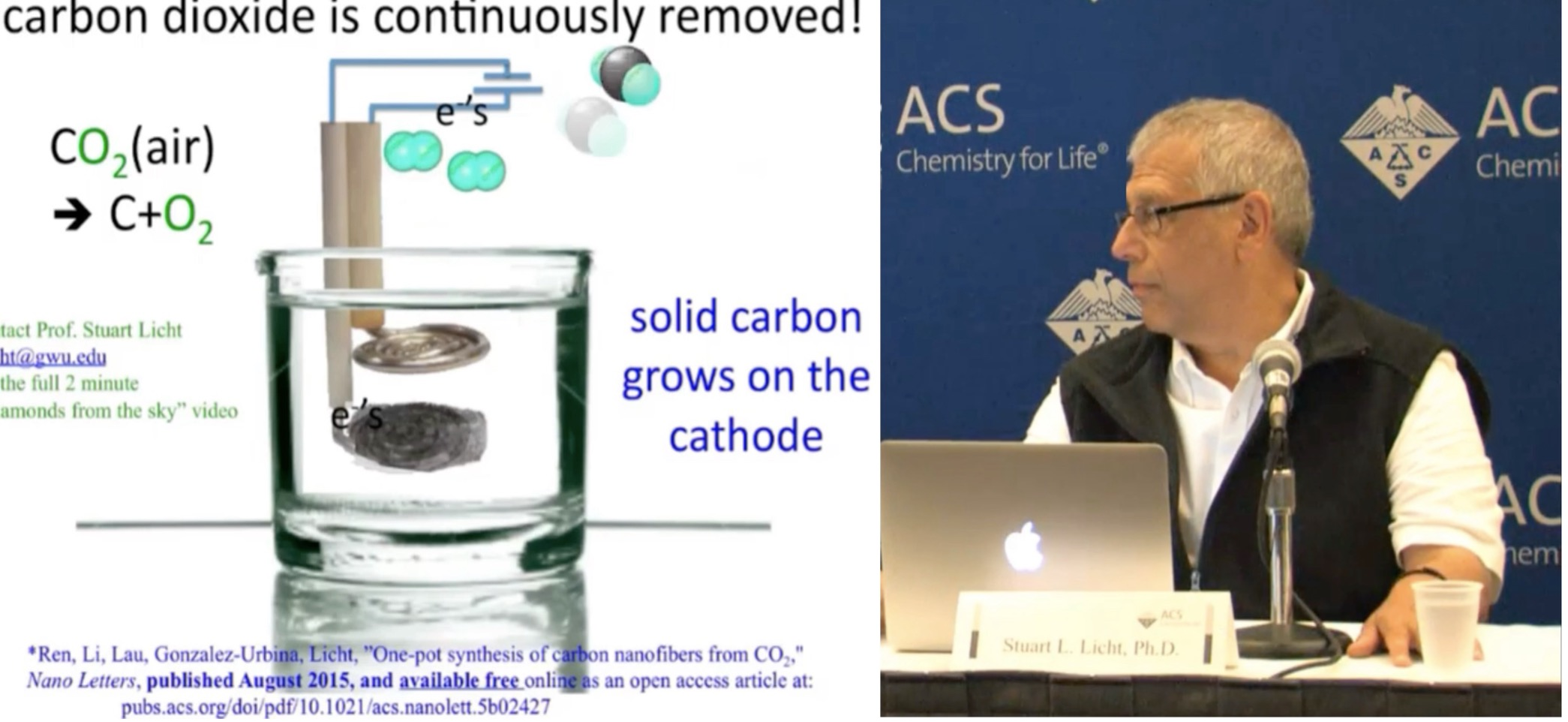
Stuart Licht's ACS Conference on CO2 to CNM (2015).

He is the developer of the Solar Thermal Electrochemical Photo (STEP) process, which combines solar energy and high-temperature electrolysis to eliminate or convert carbon dioxide into solid carbon nanomaterials. Examples of STEP CO_{2} elimination processes are STEP iron and STEP cement. STEP carbon capture converts CO_{2} directly into solid carbon, and in particular, a new chemistry, C2CNT (CO_{2} to carbon nanomaterial technology) decarbonization, which transforms carbon dioxide directly to various graphene nano-allotropes of carbon, such as carbon nanotubes and carbon nano-onions.

In a 2015 "Diamonds from the Sky" American Chemical Society press conference, Prof. Licht described the discovery and the carbon dioxide removal process. The decarbonization chemistry is driven by CO_{2} splitting and a new molten carbonate transition metal nucleation electrolytic growth chemistry into high purity graphene materials such as carbon nanotubes. These electrolytic C2CNT CNTs may be distinguished from common CVD (chemical vapor deposition) grown CNTs. The resulting nanocarbons such as a wide variety of advanced material CNTs, graphene, nano-onions and graphene nano-scaffold, all made from CO_{2}, have applications in composites, cement, EMF shielding, metal replacement, water purification, higher capacity and more rechargeable batteries, plasmas, polymers, medical delivery, and electronics. The STEP Carbon Capture process is designed to both capture and utilize CO_{2}, contributing to climate mitigation efforts.

In addition to carbon conversion, Licht has conducted research in solar water splitting, and battery technologies, including iron(VI) redox systems (nicknamed "super iron battery"), aluminum–sulfur batteries, polysulfide batteries, highest power domain aluminum/permanganate, ferricyanide or peroxide batteries, non-aqueous aluminum and lithium batteries, and molten-air batteries. Licht introduced theoretical and experimental tools for the measurement of aqueous pH beyond14 pH, and other novel analytical methodologies to probe analytes in concentrated medium, including spectroscopy in the domain in which the path of the incident length is shorter than the wavelength of the incident light in the spectroscopy to determine speciation and activity in concentrated media without perturbing the equilibria by dilution. He has also delineated extensive revisions of the fundamental physical chemical constants of high purity water, selenides, sulfides, and iodides.

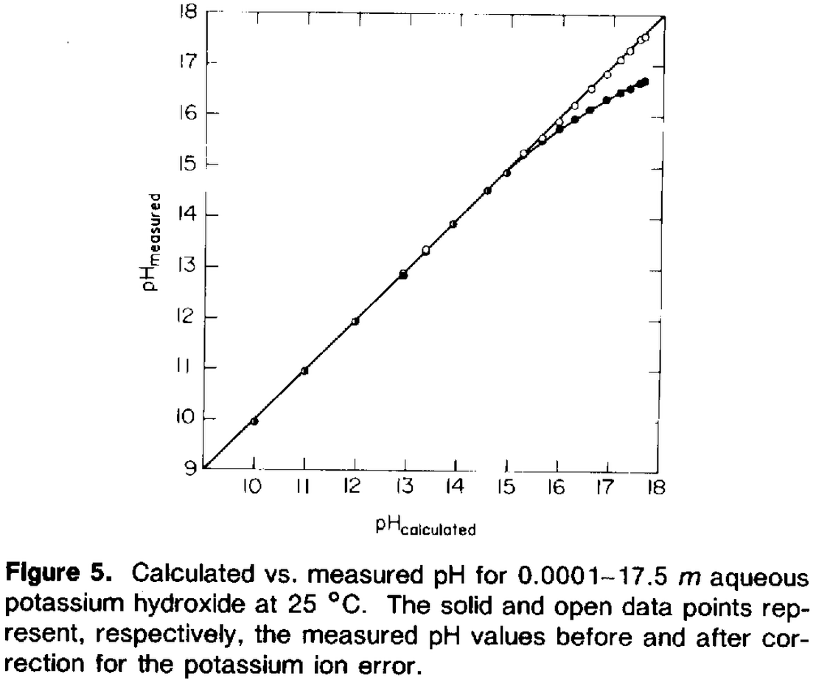
Measurement at extreme basic pH from extremely alkaline solution made by Stuart Licht in 1985.

He has authored numerous scientific publications and holds patents related to physical chemistry, carbon removal, solar energy and energy storage, and books including those on photoelectrochemistry, and solar hydrogen generation.

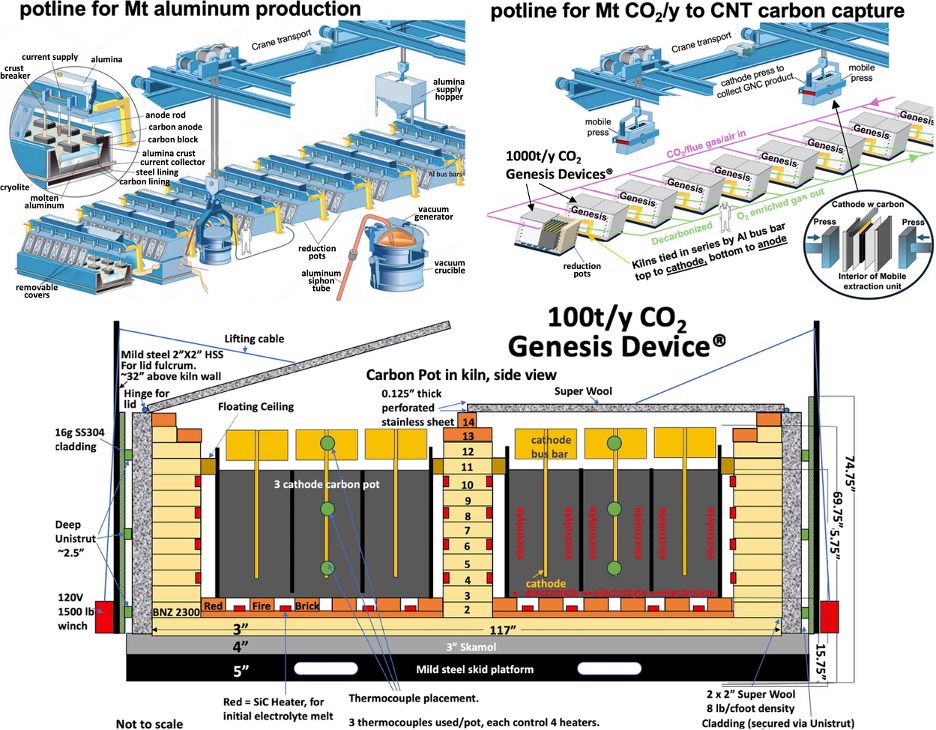
Diagram of Genesis Plant to make CNTs. (Top) Commercially operable aluminum smelting facility. (Bottom left) Design of the current 100t/y (tonne/y) CO2 Genesis Device® for decarbonization and production of GNCs such as CNTs. (Bottom right) Planned design of the Genesis Device to deliver 1Mt/yr CO2 decarbonization (and produce 0.25Mt GNCs) based on the analogous Mt Al facility, using a ten-fold increase (kt/y) from the current module Genesis Device used in series. Copied under Creative Commons License 3.0.

By 2024, Licht's STEP-based carbon conversion technology (Carbon Dioxide to Carbon Nanotubes (C2CNT) had progressed to industrial demonstration through Carbon Corp in Calgary, Canada. Several advances included the decarbonization electrode size was scaled from square centimeters to square meters. Electrochemical tuning of C2CNT enabled CO₂ conversion into specific carbon nanostructures, including magnetic forms, branched "tree" shapes, long, thin, fibers, bamboo, web, pearl, and helical CNTs, as well as doped GNCs, carbon nano-onions, nano-scaffolds, and graphene. Additionally, the group used C2CNT CNM to make pure electrolytic buckypapers and high-strength, electrically conductive electrolytic CNT polymer and cement composites were formed. In addition, the C2CNT electrolyte chemistry was optimized to be an order of magnitude less costly, using strontium instead of lithium carbonate. Both direct air capture and carbon capture and utilization versions of C2CNT were developed. The technology received recognition from the Xprize Foundation for its potential to create valuable products from captured CO_{2} and to reduce the carbon footprint of materials such as cement and polymers.

Extraction of CNT from molten carbonate at Calgary, Canada C2CNT Plant.

Scale-up during this time included developing novel pressing based extraction method to extract carbon nanomaterials from electrolyte at high pressures.

Later on, he investigated C2CNT's CNT to create a unique, cold dusty plasma through microwave radiation efficiently shown below as an image and video.

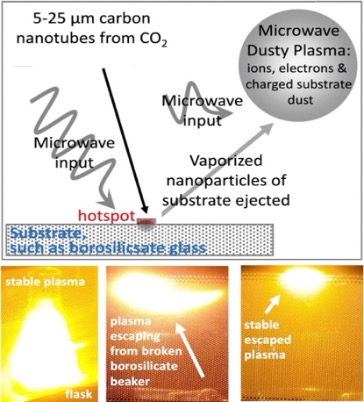
Microwave induced plasma created by C2CNT's CNTs hot enough to melt a flask.

Microwave generating plasma catalyzed by C2CNT CNTs. Hot enough to melt glass beakers.

Licht is the grandson of industrial chemist Joseph Licht, published with his father analytical chemist Truman Licht, and published and patent extensively with his son Gad Licht. His over 900 patents and publications, have often focused on removal of the greenhouse gases. He also has an extensive presence in the journals Nature and Science.

== Selected honors ==
- 2005 Beckman Young Investigators Award
- 2006 Energy Technology Research Award, Electrochemical Society
- 2013 Outstanding Academic Achievement Award, NEPU
- 2015 Presidential Green Chemistry Challenge Award by EPA
- 2015 Open Innovation Energy Storage Prize, BASF
- 2016 Hillebrand Prize
- 2018 Fellow of the Electrochemical Society
- 2019 Distinguished Researcher Award by the George Washington University
- 2022 XFactor XPrize Award for the most valuable product from CO_{2}, Carbon Corp Team Leader by Xprize Foundation.
