= Elizabeth Gavis =

American biologist

- Education: Stanford University; Yale University
- Scientific career
- Workplaces: Princeton University; Whitehead Institute
- Thesis: Characterization of the U̲l̲t̲r̲a̲b̲i̲t̲h̲o̲r̲a̲x̲ proteins of D̲r̲o̲s̲o̲p̲h̲i̲l̲a̲ M̲e̲l̲a̲n̲o̲g̲a̲s̲t̲e̲r̲ (1991)

Elizabeth Gavis is an American biologist who is the Damon B. Pfeiffer Professor of Life Sciences, at Princeton University. Gavis served as the President of the North American Drosophila Board of Directors in 2011.

== Early life and education ==
Gavis was an undergraduate student at Yale University, where she majored in biology and graduated summa cum laude. She developed a passion for research during her summer holidays spent as a summer fellow in the Carnegie Institution for Science, working in the department of embryology, and the Johns Hopkins University. Gavis completed her thesis research in the laboratory of Joseph G. Gall. She moved to the Stanford University School of Medicine for her graduate research, where she earned an MD–PhD in 1990. She was based in the research group of David Hogness. During her doctoral studies Gavis worked on the Bithorax complex. She became increasingly interested in genetics, and particularly developmental gene regulation.

== Research and career ==
Gavis joined the laboratory of Ruth Lehmann at the Whitehead Institute. She was appointed to the faculty at Princeton University in 1994, where she would be promoted to Professor in 2008 and the Damon B. Pfeiffer Endowed Professor in 2016. Gavis spent a year on sabbatical at the University of Cambridge, where she worked with Andrea Brand.

Gavis makes use of Drosophila as a model organism to study Messenger RNA (mRNA) localisation, translation, stability and degradation. She has used single molecule imaging to identify how various mRNAs localise to the back of a developing Drosophila egg. She showed that these mRNAs pack into highly ordered germ granules, which are segregated into germ cell progenitors and their development.

She investigated the hnRNP F/H RNA binding protein Glorund and demonstrated it uses a novel mode of interaction to both bind and repress the RNAs. This mode of interaction may regulate their splicing.

== Academic service ==
Gavis has held various positions in the Genetics Society of America, including serving as the President of the Drosophila Board of Directors. In this capacity she established the Victoria Finnerty Undergraduate Travel Award, which looked to support undergraduate students to attend the Annual Drosophila Conference. She is also involved with science communication activities with the general public.

== Selected publications ==
- S. L. McKnight; Gavis, Elizabeth R.; R. Kingsbury; Axel, Richard (1981). "Analysis of transcriptional regulatory signals of the HSV thymidine kinase gene: Identification of an upstream control region". Cell. 25 (2): 385–398. doi:10.1016/0092-8674(81)90057-x. PMID 6269744. Wikidata Q48408790.
- Gavis, Elizabeth R.; R. Lehmann (1992). "Localization of nanos RNA controls embryonic polarity". Cell. 71 (2): 301–313. doi:10.1016/0092-8674(92)90358-j. PMID 1423595. Wikidata Q50789762.
- Kevin M Forrest; Elizabeth R Gavis (2003). "Live imaging of endogenous RNA reveals a diffusion and entrapment mechanism for nanos mRNA localization in Drosophila". Current Biology. 13 (14): 1159–1168. doi:10.1016/s0960-9822(03)00451-2. PMID 12867026. Wikidata Q48824977.
