= Christopher D. Lima =

American biologist

- Born: Willoughby, Ohio, US
- Spouse: Diane Stockwell (m. 2005)

Academic background
- Education: BA, biochemistry, 1989, Ohio State University; PhD, Biochemistry and Biophysics, 1994, Northwestern University

Christopher David Lima is an American biologist. He is currently Chair and Member at the Sloan Kettering Institute of Memorial Sloan Kettering Cancer Center and an Investigator of the Howard Hughes Medical Institute. He is an elected fellow of the American Academy of Arts & Sciences and National Academy of Sciences.

== Early life and education ==
Lima was born to parents Nancy and David Lima in Willoughby, Ohio. His mother is a former admissions counselor at the Andrews School and his father is a former psychotherapist. He completed his Bachelor of Arts degree in biochemistry from Ohio State University in 1989 and his Ph.D. in biochemistry and biophysics from Northwestern University. Following this, he studied as a Helen Hay Whitney Fellow at Columbia University under the guidance of Wayne Hendrickson.

== Personal life ==
Lima married Diane Stockwell in 2005. They have one son born in 2009.
