= Geoffrey Chang =

21st-century American biologist

Geoffrey Chang is a professor at the University of California, San Diego's Skaggs School of Pharmacy and Pharmaceutical Sciences and Department of Pharmacology, School of Medicine. His laboratory focuses on the structural biology of integral membrane proteins, particularly exploring X-ray crystallography techniques for solving the tertiary structures of membrane proteins that are notoriously resistant to crystallization. The laboratory has specialized in structures of multidrug resistance transporter proteins in bacteria. In 2001, while a faculty member of The Scripps Research Institute, Chang was awarded a Beckman Young Investigators Award, designed to support researchers early in their academic careers, for his work on the structural biology of multidrug resistance. Chang announced a move from Scripps to neighboring UC San Diego in 2012.

In 2007, Chang and coauthors retracted five previously published papers describing the structures of three multidrug transporter proteins after another research group published a widely differing structure, which led to the discovery of a critical bug in the Chang group's custom software tools. Since that time, however, Chang has published other papers in the field of structural biology, and has been awarded a EUREKA grant, "for exceptionally innovative research projects that could have an extraordinarily significant impact on many areas of science," from the National Institutes of Health.

== Retracted papers ==
Chang and coauthors published papers on the structures of multidrug resistance transporters known as EmrE, and MsbA. Although the initial structures were widely considered puzzling in the field due to their unexpected placement of their ATP binding sites in the assembled dimer, the publication of an additional structure in the same protein family indicated that the Chang structures were unlikely to represent the biologically active conformation of the molecules. Chang and coauthors issued retractions of their structural papers on EmrE, and MsbA, citing an error in an internal software utility as the source of the data misinterpretation that led to the appearance of wrongly assembled dimers. The application of a popular protein structure validation tool to one of the retracted MsbA structures results in scores that indicate severe errors in this structure.

The following papers were retracted in 2007:

- Chang, G; Roth, CB (2001). "Structure of MsbA from E. coli: a homolog of the multidrug resistance ATP binding cassette (ABC) transporters". Science. 293 (5536): 1793–800. Bibcode:2001Sci...293.1793C. doi:10.1126/science.293.5536.1793. PMID 11546864. (Retracted, see doi:10.1126/science.314.5807.1875b, PMID 17185584)
- Pornillos, O; Chen, YJ; Chen, AP; Chang, G (2005). "X-ray structure of the EmrE multidrug transporter in complex with a substrate". Science. 310 (5756): 1950–3. Bibcode:2005Sci...310.1950P. doi:10.1126/science.1119776. PMID 16373573. (Retracted, see doi:10.1126/science.314.5807.1875b, PMID 17185584)
- Reyes, CL; Chang, G (2005). "Structure of the ABC transporter MsbA in complex with ADP.vanadate and lipopolysaccharide". Science. 308 (5724): 1028–31. Bibcode:2005Sci...308.1028R. doi:10.1126/science.1107733. PMID 15890884. S2CID 37250061. (Retracted, see doi:10.1126/science.314.5807.1875b, PMID 17185584)
- Chang, G (2003). "Structure of MsbA from Vibrio cholera: a multidrug resistance ABC transporter homolog in a closed conformation". J Mol Biol. 330 (2): 419–30. doi:10.1016/s0022-2836(03)00587-4. PMID 12823979.
- Ma, C; Chang, G (2004). "Structure of the multidrug resistance efflux transporter EmrE from Escherichia coli". Proc Natl Acad Sci USA. 101 (9): 2852–7. Bibcode:2004PNAS..101.2852M. doi:10.1073/pnas.0400137101. PMC 365709. PMID 14970332. (Retracted, see doi:10.1073/pnas.0700711104, PMID 17360700)

The episode has been referenced in both the scientific and popular media as a case study motivating improved software engineering practices in computational biology.

== Recent work ==
In 2009, Chang published a paper in Science, describing a protein that keeps certain substances, including many drugs, out of cells. The protein, called P-glycoprotein or P-gp for short, is one of the main reasons cancer cells are resistant to chemotherapy drugs. In 2010, he led a study published in Nature detailing the structure of the MATE (Multi antimicrobial extrusion protein) family transporter NorM, which belongs to a member of the only remaining class of multidrug resistance transporters left to be described by scientists. The work has implications for combating dangerous antibiotic resistant strains of bacteria, as well as for developing hardy strains of agricultural crops.
