= Jeanne Hardy =

American professor of biological and biophysical chemistry

Jeanne A. Hardy, PH.D.
- Occupations: Professor of Biological and Biophysical Chemistry

Academic background
- Education: Utah State University, University of California - Berkeley
- Doctoral advisor: Hillary C.M. Nelson

Jeanne A. Hardy is an American professor of biological and biophysical chemistry at the University of Massachusetts, Amherst. Her group's work is best known for designing allosteric binding sites and control elements into human proteases.

== Education ==
Hardy received her B.S. and M.S. from Utah State University in 1994, working with Professor Ann Aust on bioinorganic chemistry projects relating to protein binding of iron and asbestos. She received a Ph.D. in 2000 from the University of California, Berkeley, working with Prof. Hillary C.M. Nelson on the structure of Heat Shock Transcription Factor, which plays various roles as a molecular chaperone and an immune stimulant. Her postdoctoral work was undertaken at Sunesis Pharmaceuticals with National Academy of Inventors member and UCSF professor James "Jim" Wells, who told her how to invent tethering.

== Career ==
Hardy joined the University of Massachusetts in 2005. She built a research program upon the biophysics of human proteases. Her research focuses especially on caspases, apoptotic proteins involved in the regulation of cell death, and with impacts in conditions such as Alzheimer's and Parkinson's Disease. Hardy's research group has determined allosteric regulation of caspase-6 selectively by zinc, mutation-based regulation of caspase-7, and lead molecules against heat shock and multiple other cysteine proteases. Purportedly for this work, she was awarded tenure in 2012, and promoted to Full Professor in 2018.

== Awards ==
- 2018 - Inaugural Mahoney Prize in the Life Sciences
- 2014 - Fulbright Scholar, Paris, France
- 2009 - Lilly Teaching Fellowship
- 2008 - Cottrell Scholar Award
- 2003 - NIH Postdoctoral Fellow
- 2000 - JSPS Postdoctoral Fellow
