= Carla Koehler =

American biochemist

Carla Marie Koehler
- Education: University of Wisconsin-River Falls; Iowa State University
- Scientific career
- Workplaces: University of California, Los Angeles
- Thesis: Molecular characterization of bovine mitochondrial DNA (1989)
- Website: Koehler Lab

Carla M. Koehler is an American biochemist who is a professor at the University of California, Los Angeles. Her research considers mitochondria and the processes which import proteins to their appropriate locations in the organelles. She was elected Fellow of the American Association for the Advancement of Science in 2018.

== Early life and education ==
Koehler grew up in rural Wisconsin. She lived on a farm, where she had horses and cows. She helped her parents look after the livestock, including developing breeding methods to increase milk production. She has said these childhood experiences motivated her to pursue a career in genetics. She attended the University of Wisconsin–River Falls and majored in biochemistry. She originally thought that she wanted to be a vet, and attended veterinary school at Iowa State University for one year. Koehler realized that she would rather pursue a career in research, and applied for graduate program in biochemistry at Iowa State. It was during her master's program that she was first introduced to mitochondria, in particular how it was inherited in cows. She remained at Iowa State for her doctoral research, where she joined the laboratory of Alan Myers. Her research considered protein import into the organelles of mitochondria.

== Research and career ==
Koehler was a postdoctoral researcher at the Biozentrum University of Basel, where she studied the processes by which proteins enter mitochondria, in the laboratory of Gottfried Schatz. During her postdoctoral research, she worked on multi protein complexes of the translocase of the outer membrane. She identified several novel translocase of the inner membrane proteins by developing temperature sensitive mutants.

In 1999, Koehler joined the Molecular Biology Institute at the University of California, Los Angeles. Koehler makes use of genetics and biochemistry to understand the biogenesis of mitochondria. She has extensively investigated the import pathways of the translocase of the inner membrane (TIM) and translocase of the outer membrane (TOM) complexes. By understanding these biological pathways, Koehler looks to better understand the dysfunction in mitochondria that can give rise to disease. She spent 2013 on a sabbatical at the National Institutes of Health.

== Awards and honors ==
- 2002 Beckman Young Investigator Program Award
- 2008 Elected Fellow of the American Association for the Advancement of Science
- 2010 University of California, Los Angeles Herbert Newby McCoy Award

== Selected publications ==
- Agnieszka Chacinska; Carla M. Koehler; Dusanka Milenkovic; Trevor Lithgow; Nikolaus Pfanner (21 August 2009). "Importing mitochondrial proteins: machineries and mechanisms". Cell. 138 (4): 628–44. doi:10.1016/j.cell.2009.08.005. ISSN 0092-8674. PMC 4099469. PMID 19703392. Wikidata Q29616477.
- Jin Zhang; Ivan Khvorostov; Jason S Hong; et al. (15 November 2011). "UCP2 regulates energy metabolism and differentiation potential of human pluripotent stem cells". The EMBO Journal. 30 (24): 4860–4873. doi:10.1038/emboj.2011.401. ISSN 0261-4189. PMC 3243621. PMID 22085932. Wikidata Q35626387.
- Jin Zhang; Esther Nuebel; George Q Daley; Carla M Koehler; Michael A. Teitell (1 November 2012). "Metabolic regulation in pluripotent stem cells during reprogramming and self-renewal". Cell Stem Cell. 11 (5): 589–595. doi:10.1016/j.stem.2012.10.005. ISSN 1934-5909. PMC 3492890. PMID 23122286. Wikidata Q41354586.
