= Clodagh O'Shea =

Biologist

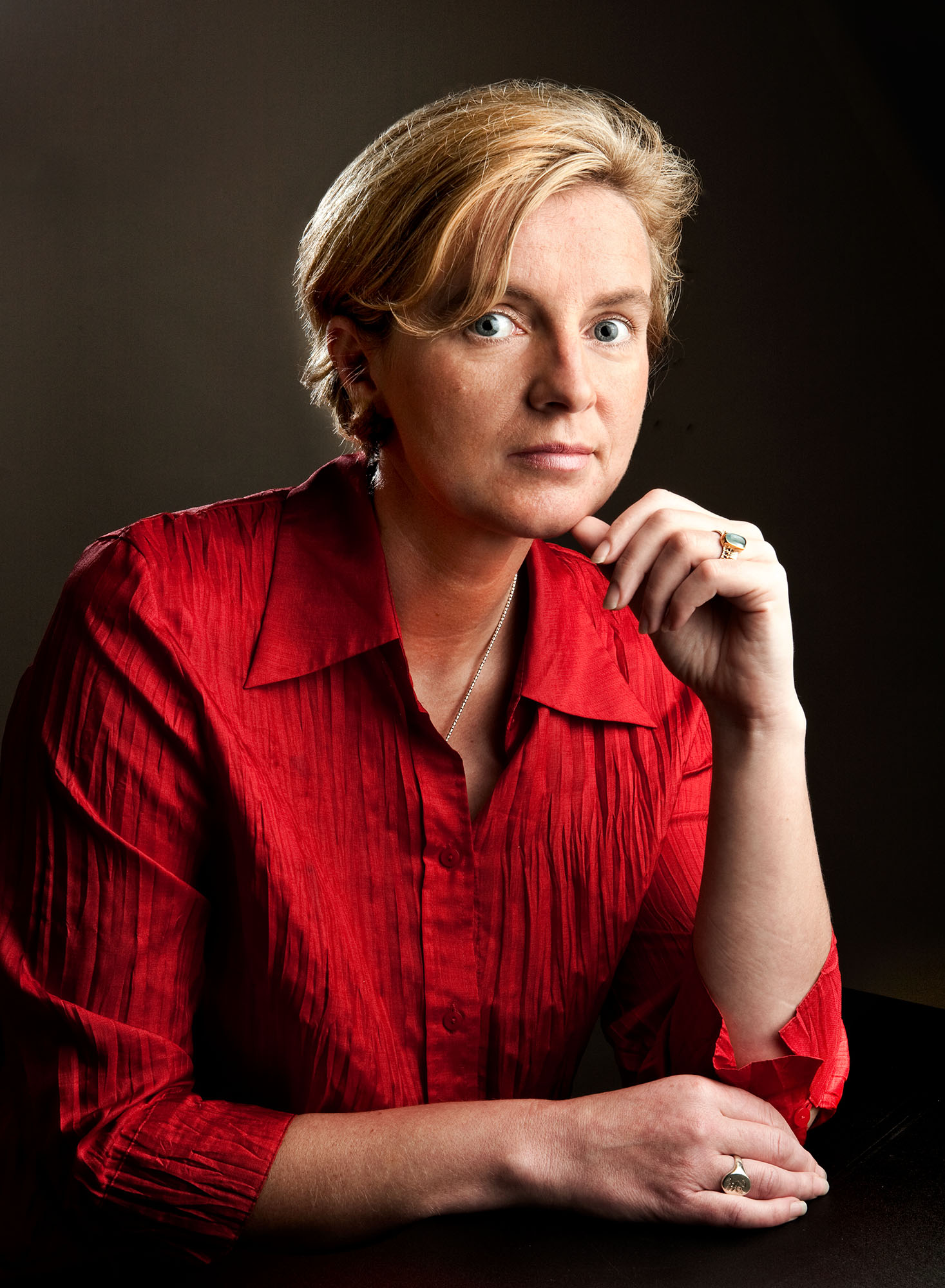
- Born: Cork
- Education: University College Cork (BS) Imperial College London (PhD)
- Occupations: Professor of molecular and cell biology
- Employer: Salk Institute for Biological Sciences
- Known for: Virally targeting cancer cells
- Website: https://www.salk.edu/scientist/clodagh-oshea/

Clodagh C. O'Shea is a professor of molecular and cell biology and current Wicklow Chair at the Salk Institute for Biological Sciences and a scholar at the Howard Hughes Medical Institute. She is also an adjunct professor at UCSD and the Scientific Founder of IconOVir Bio.

== Education ==
Born and raised in Cork, Ireland, O'Shea has a BS in biochemistry and microbiology from University College Cork, Ireland. She obtained a PhD from Imperial College London, revealing key signals that regulate the development of our immune systems. After her graduate studies, she was selected for a Raleigh International expedition to Namibia where she worked on environmental, conservation and development projects. She was a Postdoctoral Fellow at the UCSF Comprehensive Cancer Center, San Francisco, United States.

== Career and research ==
O'Shea joined the faculty at the Salk Institute in 2007. She was promoted to associate professor in 2013, and Full Professor in 2018. O'Shea's group designs synthetic viruses. Her team also developed ChromEMT, which enables the 3D folding of genomic DNA to be visualized in the cell nucleus, revealing the chromatin structures that determine gene activation and cell fate.

O'Shea is the Scientific Founder of IconOVir Bio and Chair of IconOVir's Scientific Advisory Board. The clinical-stage biotechnology company hopes to pioneer the next generation of oncolytic virus therapy to improve the treatment of patients with cancer.

== Selected publications ==
- O'Shea, Clodagh C.; Choi, Serah; McCormick, Frank; Stokoe, David (2 May 2005). "Adenovirus Overrides Cellular Checkpoints for Protein Translation". Cell Cycle. 4 (7): 883–888. doi:10.4161/cc.4.7.1791. PMID 15970698.
- Ringshausen, Ingo; O'Shea, Clodagh C.; Finch, Andrew J.; Swigart, Lamorna Brown; Evan, Gerard I. (December 2006). "Mdm2 is critically and continuously required to suppress lethal p53 activity in vivo". Cancer Cell. 10 (6): 501–514. doi:10.1016/j.ccr.2006.10.010. PMID 17157790.
- Heimbucher, Thomas; Liu, Zheng; Bossard, Carine; McCloskey, Richard; Carrano, Andrea C.; Riedel, Christian G.; Tanasa, Bogdan; Klammt, Christian; Fonslow, Bryan R.; Riera, Celine E.; Lillemeier, Bjorn F. (July 2015). "The Deubiquitylase MATH-33 Controls DAF-16 Stability and Function in Metabolism and Longevity". Cell Metabolism. 22 (1): 151–163. doi:10.1016/j.cmet.2015.06.002. PMC 4502596. PMID 26154057.
- Shah, Govind A.; O'Shea, Clodagh C. (August 2015). "Viral and Cellular Genomes Activate Distinct DNA Damage Responses". Cell. 162 (5): 987–1002. doi:10.1016/j.cell.2015.07.058. PMC 4681434. PMID 26317467.
- Higginbotham, Jennifer M.; O'Shea, Clodagh C. (15 October 2015). Imperiale, M. J. (ed.). "Adenovirus E4-ORF3 Targets PIAS3 and Together with E1B-55K Remodels SUMO Interactions in the Nucleus and at Virus Genome Replication Domains". Journal of Virology. 89 (20): 10260–10272. doi:10.1128/JVI.01091-15. ISSN 0022-538X. PMC 4580165. PMID 26223632.
- Ou, Horng D.; Deerinck, Thomas J.; Bushong, Eric; Ellisman, Mark H.; O'Shea, Clodagh C. (November 2015). "Visualizing viral protein structures in cells using genetic probes for correlated light and electron microscopy". Methods. 90: 39–48. doi:10.1016/j.ymeth.2015.06.002. PMC 4655137. PMID 26066760.
- Tufail, Yusuf; Cook, Daniela; Fourgeaud, Lawrence; Powers, Colin J.; Merten, Katharina; Clark, Charles L.; Hoffman, Elizabeth; Ngo, Alexander; Sekiguchi, Kohei J.; O'Shea, Clodagh C.; Lemke, Greg (February 2017). "Phosphatidylserine Exposure Controls Viral Innate Immune Responses by Microglia". Neuron. 93 (3): 574–586.e8. doi:10.1016/j.neuron.2016.12.021. PMC 5600182. PMID 28111081.
- Ou, Horng D.; Phan, Sébastien; Deerinck, Thomas J.; Thor, Andrea; Ellisman, Mark H.; O'Shea, Clodagh C. (28 July 2017). "ChromEMT: Visualizing 3D chromatin structure and compaction in interphase and mitotic cells". Science. 357 (6349) eaag0025. doi:10.1126/science.aag0025. ISSN 0036-8075. PMC 5646685. PMID 28751582.
- Dekker, Job; Belmont, Andrew S.; Guttman, Mitchell; Leshyk, Victor O.; Lis, John T.; Lomvardas, Stavros; Mirny, Leonid A.; O'Shea, Clodagh C.; Park, Peter J.; Ren, Bing; Politz, Joan C. Ritland; Shendure, Jay; Zhong, Sheng (14 September 2017). "The 4D nucleome project". Nature. 549 (7671): 219–226. Bibcode:2017Natur.549..219D. doi:10.1038/nature23884. PMC 5617335. PMID 28905911.

== Awards ==
- 2007 Emerald Foundation Scholar
- 2008 ACGT Young Investigator Award for Cancer Gene Therapy
- 2008 Arnold and Mabel Beckman Young Investigators Award
- 2009 Sontag Distinguished Scientist Award
- 2011 Science/NSF International Science & Visualization Challenge, People's Choice
- 2016 Howard Hughes Medical Institute Faculty Scholar
- 2018 Paul G. Allen Frontiers Group's Allen Distinguished Investigator
