= Catherine Blish =

Translational immunologist

- Citizenship: United States
- Education: BS, University of California, Davis, Biochemistry (1993) PhD, University of Washington, Immunology (1999) MD, University of Washington (2001) Residency: University of Washington Medical Center (2003) American Board of Internal Medicine, Infectious Diseases (2006)
- Known for: Innate immune system, HIV/AIDS, NK cells
- Awards: ICAAC Young Investigator Award, American Society for Microbiology (2010) NIH Director's New Innovator Award, National Institutes of Health (2013) Elected Member, American Society for Clinical Investigation (2016) Fellow, Infectious Diseases Society of America (2017) Chan Zuckerberg Investigator (2017)
- Scientific career
- Fields: Immunology
- Workplaces: Stanford University
- Website: https://med.stanford.edu/blishlab.html

Catherine Blish is a translational immunologist and professor at Stanford University. Her lab works on clinical immunology and focuses primarily on the role of the innate immune system in fighting infectious diseases like HIV, dengue fever, and influenza. Her immune cell biology work characterizes the biology and action of Natural Killer (NK) cells and macrophages.

For her previous and ongoing work fighting HIV/AIDS, Blish was awarded the 2018 Avant-Garde Award from the National Institute on Drug Abuse.

== Contributions to immunology ==
=== Natural Killer cell immune memory ===
A key concept in the adaptive immune system, and the foundational science behind vaccines, is that some elements of the immune system recognizes antigens it has seen before in a process called as immunological memory. Dr. Blish and colleagues have identified a potential mechanism through which NK cells may also display immune memory. This is unusual and shifts the accepted paradigm because NK cells are typically considered part of the innate immune system, not the adaptive immune system. Dr. Blish and colleagues demonstrate antigen-specific recognition, and memory of viruses and viral antigens by NK cells in mice and primates.

=== Key papers ===
The papers authored or co-authored by Dr. Blish that have been cited ~100 or more times are:

- "Genetic and environmental determinants of human NK cell diversity revealed by mass cytometry," Science Translational Medicine.
- "Intrinsic retroviral reactivation in human preimplantation embryos and pluripotent cells," Nature.
- "Breadth of neutralizing antibody response to human immunodeficiency virus type 1 is affected by factors early in infection but does not influence disease progression," Journal of Virology.
- "Human immunodeficiency virus type 1 superinfection occurs despite relatively robust neutralizing antibody responses," Journal of Virology.
- "Human NK cell repertoire diversity reflects immune experience and correlates with viral susceptibility," Science Translational Medicine.
- "Enhancing exposure of HIV-1 neutralization epitopes through mutations in gp41," PLOS Medicine.
- "HIV-1 subtype A envelope variants from early in infection have variable sensitivity to neutralization and to inhibitors of viral entry," AIDS.

== COVID-19 ==
In 2020, Dr. Blish's lab pivoted to work on SARS-CoV-2 due to the COVID-19 pandemic.

== Honors ==
- Chan Zuckerberg Investigator (2017), Chan Zuckerberg Initiative
- National Institute of Health Director's New Innovator Award (2013)
