= Philip LeDuc =

Philip LeDuc (born June 5, 1970) is the William J. Brown Professor at Carnegie Mellon University (CMU) and the Founding Director of the Center for the Mechanics and Engineering of Cellular Systems. He is in the department of Mechanical Engineering, but also has appointments in Biological Sciences, Computational Biology, Biomedical Engineering, Electrical and Computer Engineering, and Robotics Institute. LeDuc works at the intersection of mechanical engineering, biology, and nature.

== Biography ==
LeDuc earned his bachelor's degree and master's degree in mechanical engineering from North Carolina State University in 1993 and 1995, respectively. In 1998, he completed his Ph.D. at Johns Hopkins University. From 1999 to 2002, LeDuc was a research fellow at Children's Hospital/Harvard Medical School.

In 2002, LeDuc became an assistant professor at CMU. He was promoted to associate professor in 2007, full professor in 2011, and the William J. Brown professor in 2014.

== Awards ==
LeDuc has received a Bill & Melinda Gates Foundation Grand Challenges Award, National Science Foundation CAREER and a Beckman Young Investigator Award (2nd professor ever at Carnegie Mellon to win this award). He is an elected fellow of the American Association for the Advancement of Science (AAAS), Biomedical Engineering Society (BMES), American Society of Mechanical Engineers (ASME), International Academy of Medical and Biological Engineering (IAMBE), and American Institute for Medical Biological Engineering (AIMBE). He was on the Board of Directors of BMES and AIMBE, and the Science Advisory Council of the Beckman Foundation. He also has been a founder of numerous companies including Lifeware Labs and PlacentaAI.

His wife, Rachel, and Philip have a daughter and two sons. He has been involved with many philanthropic organizations including raising money for non-profit organizations and mission trips to Africa and Armenia.

== Selected works ==
LeDuc is the author of over 150 peer-reviewed publications. Some selected ones are:

- Arias-Rosales, A., Wheelock, A.K., Moritz, K., LeDuc, P.*, Cagan, J.* Rembrandt through the Eyes of the Machine: Toward Explainable Human–AI collaboration in Painting Attribution. Proceedings of the National Academy of Sciences (2026; doi.org/10.1073/pnas.262698912).
- Sahai, M., Pantanowitz, L., LeDuc, P.R.*, Cagan, J.* Unsupervised Machine Learning for Placental Disease Using Cell Spatial Organization. Nature Digital Medicine (2026; doi.org/10.1038/s41746 026-03177-1).
- Garg, A., Yang, F., Ozdoganlar, O.B.* LeDuc, P.R. * Physics of Microscale Freeform 3D Printing of Ice. Proceedings of the National Academy of Sciences 121 (30), e2322330121(2024).
- Naglich, A., LeDuc, P.R.* Plant Movement Response to Environmental Mechanical Stimulation Toward Understanding Predator Defense. Advanced Science 2404578 (8),(2024).
- Desatnik, R., Patterson, Z. Gorzelak, P., Zamora, S., LeDuc, P.*, Majidi, C.* Soft Robotics Informs How an Early Echinoderm Moved. Proceedings of the National Academy of Sciences 120(46): e2306580120 (2023).
- Frey, N., Sonmez, U., Minden, J.S.*, LeDuc, P.R.* Microtechnologies for Understanding and Engineering Model Biological Organisms. Nature Communications 13: 3195, DOI: 10.1038/s41467 022-30814-6 (2022).
- Arias-Rosales, A., LeDuc, P.* Shadow Modeling in Urban Environments for Solar Harvesting Devices with Freely Defined Positions and Orientations. Renewable and Sustainable Energy Reviews 164: 112522 (17) (2022).
- Justus, K.B., Lewis, D., Majidi, C.*, LeDuc, P.R.,*, Tan, C.* A Biosensing Soft Robot: Integrating Chemical and Optical Responsive Synthetic Cells with Soft Robotics. Science Robotics 4: eaax0765 (2019).
- Wood, A.R., Garg, R., Justus, K., Cohen-Karni, T., LeDuc, P.R.*, Alan J. Russell, A.J.* Intact Mangrove Root Electrodes for Desalination. RSC Advances 9: 4735-4743 (2019).
- Egan, P., Moore, J., Ehrlicher, A., Weitz, D., Schunn, C.*, Cagan, J.*, LeDuc, P.* Robust Mechanobiological Behavior Emerges in Heterogeneous Myosin Systems. Proceedings of the National Academy of Sciences 114: E8147–E8154 (2017).
- Egan, P., Sinko, R., LeDuc, P.R.*, Keten, S.* The Role of Mechanics in Biological and Bio-Inspired Systems. Nature Communications 6: 7418, DOI: 10.1038/ncomms8418 (2015).
- Kim, Y.T., Hazar, M., Vijayraghavan, D., Song, J., Messner, W.C.*, Davidson, L.A.*, LeDuc, P.R.* Mechanochemical Actuators of Embryonic Epithelial Contractility. Proceedings of the National Academy of Sciences 111, 14366–14371 (2014).
- LeDuc, P.R., Agaba, M., Cheng, C.-M., Gracio, J., Guzman, A., Middelberg, A. Beyond Disease, How Biomedical Engineering Can Improve Global Health. Science Translational Medicine 6, 266fs48 (2014).
- Tan, C., Saurabh, S., Bruchez, M., Schwartz, R.*, LeDuc, P.R.* Molecular Crowding Shapes Gene Expression in Synthetic Cellular Nanosystems. Nature Nanotechnology 8, 602–608 (Cover, 2013).
- LeDuc, P.R.*, Messner, W.C.,* & Wikswo, J.P.* How Do Control-Based Approaches Enter into Biology? Annual Reviews of Biomedical Engineering 13, 369-396 (2011).
- Cheng, C.M., Lin, Y-W, Bellin, R.M., Cheng, C.M., Steward, R., Cheng, Y.-R., LeDuc, P.R.*, & Chen, C-C* Probing Localized Neural Mechanotransduction through Surface-Modified Elastomeric Matrices and Electrophysiology Nature Protocols 714, 5 (4), 714-724 (2010).
- Bellin, R.M.*, Kubicek, J.D., Frigault, M.J., Kamien, A.J., Steward, R., Barnes, H.M., DiGiacomo, M.B., Duncan, L.J., Edgerly, C.K., Morse, E.M., Park, C.Y., Fredberg, J.J., Cheng, C.M., & LeDuc, P.R.* Defining the Role of Syndecan-4 in Mechanotransduction using Surface-Modification Approaches. Proceedings of the National Academy of Sciences 106, 22102-22107 (2009).
- Helmick, L., Antúnez de Mayolo, A., Zhang, Y., Cheng, C.M., Watkins, S.C., Wu, C. & LeDuc, P.* Spatiotemporal Response of Living Cell Structures in Dictyostelium discoideum with Semiconductor Quantum Dots Nano Letters 8, 1303 – 1308 (2008).
- LeDuc, P*., Wong, M*., et al. Toward an In Vivo Biologically-Inspired Nanofactory Nature Nanotechnology 2, 3-7 (2007).
- Takayama, S., Ostuni, E., LeDuc, P., Naruse, K., Ingber, D. E. & Whitesides, G. M. Subcellular positioning of small molecules. Nature 411, 1016. (2001).
- LeDuc, P., Haber, C., Bao, G. & Wirtz, D. Dynamics of individual flexible polymers in a shear flow. Nature 399, 564–6. (1999).

[*] Corresponding Author
