= Prashant K. Jain =

Indian-American scientist

Prashant Jain is an Indian-born American scientist and a professor of chemistry at the University of Illinois Urbana–Champaign where his research laboratory studies the interaction of light with matter, designs nanoparticle catalysts, and develops methods for mimicking plant photosynthesis. He is a Fellow of the American Association for the Advancement of Science and the Royal Society of Chemistry, a TR35 inventor, a Sloan Fellow, a PECASE recipient, a Royal Society of Chemistry Beilby medalist, and a top-cited researcher in chemical sciences.

== Academic background ==
Jain completed his undergraduate education in chemical engineering in Mumbai and his PhD in physical chemistry working with M. A. El-Sayed at Georgia Institute of Technology. He was a Miller Fellow at the University of California at Berkeley, prior to starting his scientific career at the University of Illinois.

== Scientific career ==
Jain is best known for discoveries and insights into plasmon resonances – collective electron oscillations in metal nanoparticles, induced by light excitation and the applications of plasmon resonances in biomedicine, optoelectronics, and chemical catalysis. In the 2010s, Jain and his coworkers at the University of Illinois and the University of California Berkeley discovered that plasmon resonances are not limited to metals, as was thought for decades, but can also be induced in semiconductor nanocrystals or quantum dots by the addition of dopants or defects. He was named a TR35 inventor in 2012 for this innovation. These findings have now been expanded to a large host of semiconductors, including silicon, greatly expanding the class of materials that exhibit plasmons and associated phenomena. Plasmons in semiconductor nanocrystals have potential utility for the development of optical computing.

At the University of Illinois, Jain's laboratory discovered the emergence of new catalytic behavior of noble metal nanoparticles when they are excited by visible light. Under continuous light excitation, the nanoparticles become photocharged. Multiple electrons and holes can be extracted from this photocharged state. As a result, the photoexcited nanoparticle catalyzes unexpected chemical transformations that are not observed in the dark. The catalytic activity depends on the nature of the light. In some cases, thermodynamically uphill reactions, like those in natural photosynthesis, are driven, which suggests that free energy is harvested from photoexcitations.

Jain's other notable contributions include the scaling law of plasmonic interactions and physical principles governing the plasmonic absorption and scattering properties of gold nanoparticles, which now form the basis of nanoparticle-based biomedical theragnostics and sensor technologies. The original paper describing these principles has been cited over 4000 times. An open-source simulation toolkit for designing plasmonic nanostructures, based on this work, has been developed and released for free use by the University of Illinois with funding from the National Science Foundation.

== Recognition ==
Jain was awarded a Guggenheim Fellowship in April 2022. He was named a Fellow of the American Physical Society in 2022 "for the development of plasmonic semiconductors and the use of plasmons to drive simultaneous multielectron reduction reactions with chemical specificity".

== See also ==
- Mostafa El-Sayed
- G. N. Lewis
- Michael Kasha
- Paul Alivisatos
- Localized surface plasmon
- Colloidal gold
- Scale invariance
