= Geeta Narlikar =

Indian–American biochemist

Geeta Jayant Narlikar
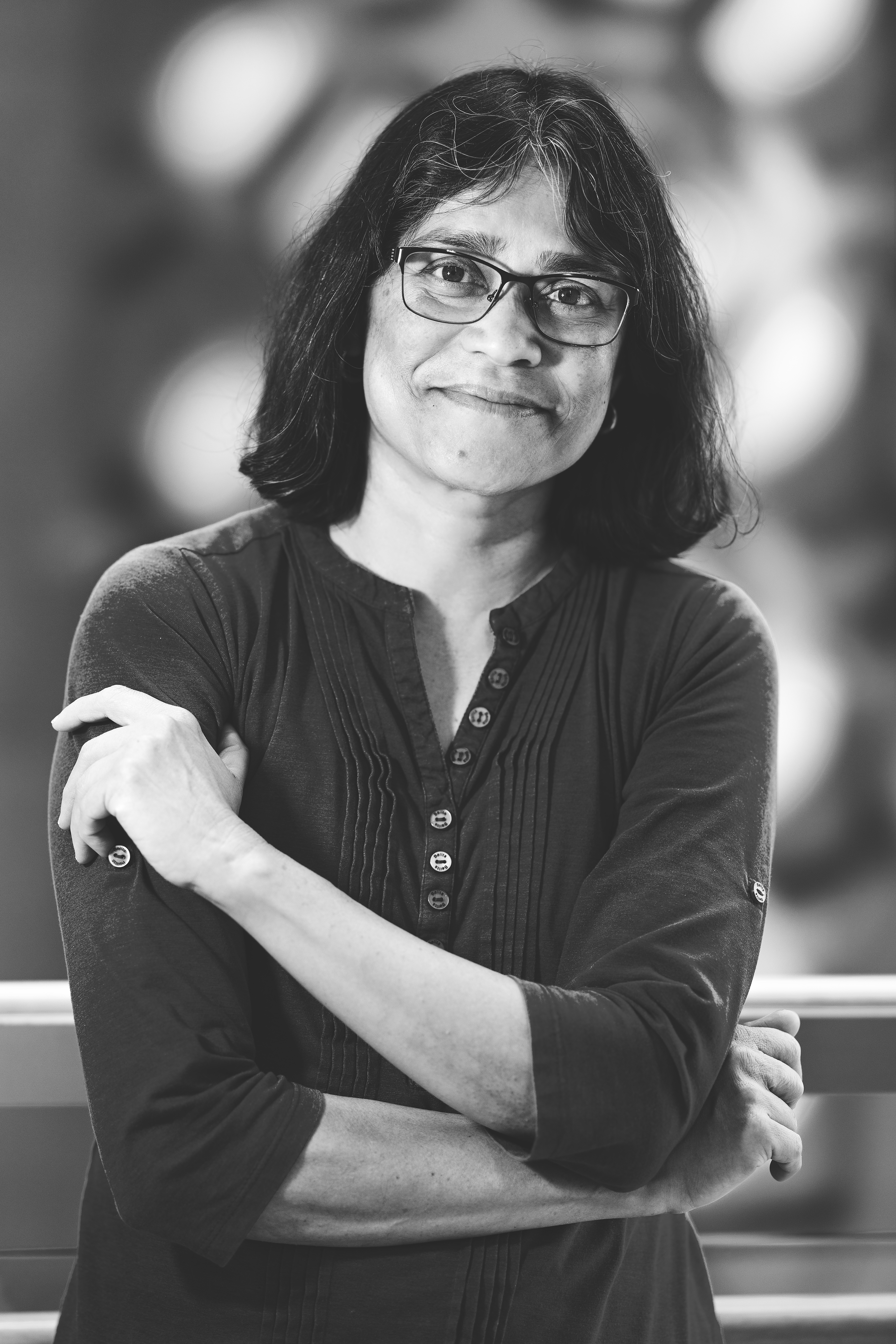
- Geeta Narlikar in 2024
- Education: Stanford University; IIT Bombay
- Scientific career
- Workplaces: University of California, San Francisco
- Thesis: Insights into RNA folding and biological catalysis through investigations with the Tetrahymena ribozyme (1998)
- Website: Narlikar Lab

Geeta J. Narlikar is an Indian–American biochemist who is Professor and Chair of the Biochemistry & Biophysics Department at the University of California, San Francisco. Her research considers epigenetic regulation and genome organisation. She was elected a Member of the National Academy of Sciences in 2021 and a Member of the American Academy of Arts & Sciences in 2024.

== Early life and education ==
Narlikar was born in India. She was an undergraduate student in chemistry at the IIT Bombay. After completing her master's degree, she moved to the United States as a graduate student at Stanford University, where she studied RNA folding and biological catalysis. Narlikar left California for the East Coast of the United States, joining Harvard Medical School as a postdoctoral researcher.

== Research and career ==
Narlikar researches the fundamental processes that underpin epigenetic mechanisms. In particular, she is interested in how nanoscale molecular motors make use of chemical energy to mechanically disrupt the genome. Beyond molecular motors, Narlikar studies the receptor-like behaviour of nucleosomes. Prior to the work of Narlikar, it was assumed that nucleosomes acted as stable and rigid docking sites for DNA. These nucleosomes change shape to regulate access to the underlying DNA. She uncovered the role of HP1a proteins in sequestering part of the genome (heterochromatin) and the role of liquid-liquid phase separation in nucleus reorganisation.

In 2014, Narlikar started to teach a summer course on Chromatin, Epigenetics, and Gene Expression at the Cold Spring Harbor Laboratory.

== Awards and honours ==
- 2006 Beckman Young Investigator Award
- 2008 Lymphoma Society Scholar Award
- 2011 University of California, San Francisco Outstanding Faculty Mentorship Award
- 2018 Biological Mechanisms of Ageing Glenn Award for Research
- 2018 IIT Bombay Distinguished Alumnus Award
- 2021 Elected Fellow of the National Academy of Sciences
- 2024 Elected Member of the American Academy of Arts & Sciences

== Selected publications ==
- Geeta J. Narlikar; Hua-Ying Fan; Robert E. Kingston (22 February 2002). "Cooperation between complexes that regulate chromatin structure and transcription". Cell. 108 (4): 475–87. doi:10.1016/s0092-8674(02)00654-2. ISSN 0092-8674. PMID 11909519. Wikidata Q29614769.
- Adam G Larson; Daniel Elnatan; Madeline M Keenen; et al. (21 June 2017). "Liquid droplet formation by HP1α suggests a role for phase separation in heterochromatin". Nature. 547 (7662): 236–240. Bibcode:2017Natur.547..236L. doi:10.1038/nature22822. ISSN 1476-4687. PMC 5606208. PMID 28636604. Wikidata Q46018754.
- Robert E. Kingston; Geeta J. Narlikar (15 September 1999). "ATP-dependent remodeling and acetylation as regulators of chromatin fluidity". Genes & Development. 13 (18): 2339–52. doi:10.1101/gad.13.18.2339. ISSN 0890-9369. PMID 10500090. Wikidata Q28145156.
