= Krystyn Van Vliet =

American engineer (born 1976)

Krystyn J. Van Vliet
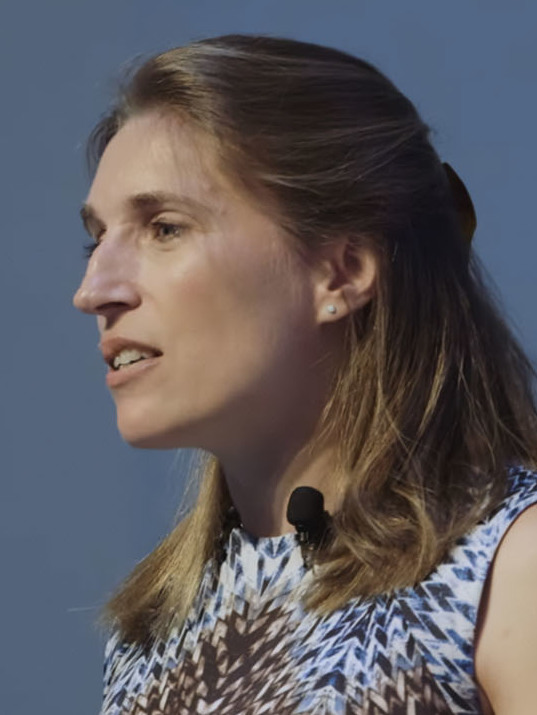
- Born: June 21, 1976 (age 50)
- Occupation: Engineer
- Title: Vice President for Research and Innovation, Cornell University

Academic background
- Education: Brown University (Sc.B.); MIT (Ph.D.)

Academic work
- Institutions: MIT; Cornell University

Krystyn J. Van Vliet (born June 21, 1976) is a professor in the Cornell University College of Engineering, where she has a joint appointment in the Department of Materials Science and Engineering and the Meinig School of Biomedical Engineering. Her research lab specializes in material chemomechanics, the coupling between chemistry and mechanics at material interfaces.

== Education ==
Van Vliet received her Sc.B. degree in Materials Science and Engineering from Brown University in 1998. While an undergraduate at Brown, she suffered grave head injuries in a car accident, and fought successfully to regain her memory, judgment, speech and other communication skills.

Van Vliet earned her Ph.D. in Materials Science and Engineering from Massachusetts Institute of Technology (MIT) in 2002.

== Career ==
Van Vliet joined the faculty at MIT in 2004 and was named MIT's associate provost in 2017. She became MIT's first associate vice president for research in 2021. She joined Cornell University as vice president for research and innovation in February 2023.
