= Robert Gilliard =

American chemist and academic

Robert J. Gilliard
- Born: Hartsville, South Carolina
- Education: University of Georgia; Clemson University
- Scientific career
- Workplaces: Massachusetts Institute of Technology; University of Virginia; ETH Zurich; Case Western Reserve University
- Thesis: Group 2 organometallic chemistry : an excursion into the chemistry of highly reactive organoberyllium complexes (2014)

Robert J. Gilliard, Jr. is an American chemist and researcher who is the Novartis Professor of Chemistry at the Massachusetts Institute of Technology. His research involves the synthesis of conjugated boron-doped materials for electronics, photoactive heterocycles for biomedical applications, hydride-rich molecules for energy storage and reaction development, and main-group element reagent design for small-molecule activation. He is an Associate Editor for the Journal of the American Chemical Society and has served as a member of the editorial advisory board for Chemical Science, Inorganic Chemistry, Chemical Communications, and Angewandte Chemie, among other scientific journals.

== Early life and education ==
Gilliard is from Hartsville, South Carolina. He attended Hartsville High School, where he was president of the student body. He was an undergraduate student at Clemson University, where he studied chemistry and worked on organometallic transition metal compounds, catalysis, and chemical sensors.

He moved to the University of Georgia for his doctoral research, where he worked alongside Gregory H. Robinson. His doctoral research focused on Group 2 organometallic chemistry. He was a UNCF Merck Fellow at ETH Zurich with Prof. Hansjörg Grützmacher and Ford Foundation Fellow Case Western Reserve University with Prof. John Protasiewicz, and worked on highly reactive phosphorus species.

== Research and career ==
In 2017, Gilliard joined the faculty at the University of Virginia, where he was promoted to associate professor in 2022. He spent 2021 as a Martin Luther King Jr. Visiting professor at Massachusetts Institute of Technology, and moved there in January 2023.

Gilliard investigates molecular systems for energy storage and catalysis. He has investigated smart materials that are responsive to external stimuli, such as light, heat and mechanical force. Gilliard has proposed thermochromic materials that could be used in combat uniforms when soldiers adapt to different temperatures or terrains. The thermochromic materials developed by Gilliard contain thermoluminescent air-stable, colour-tuneable borafluorenium ions.

Gilliard has also investigated polycyclic aromatic hydrocarbons for energy conversion. He introduces main-group atoms into polycyclic aromatic hydrocarbons and investigates the optical and electronic properties. He has shown that the introduction of boron can facilitate modulation of electronic structure or the ability to activate gas molecules such as carbon dioxide. He has demonstrated alkaline earth complexes with redox- and coordination-state flexibility that offer new possibilities for bond activation, and bismuth-containing small molecules for C-H activation.

== Awards and honors ==
- 2020 Chemical & Engineering News Talented 12
- 2021 Thieme Chemistry Journals Award
- 2021 Negative Emissions Science Scialog Collaborative Innovation Award
- 2021 National Science Foundation CAREER Award
- 2021 Alfred P. Sloan Research Fellow in Chemistry
- 2021 Organometallics Distinguished Author Award
- 2021 Beckman Young Investigator Award
- 2021 Packard Fellowship for Science and Engineering
- 2022 University of Virginia Research Excellence Award
- 2022 National Organization for the Professional Advancement of Black Chemists and Chemical Engineers Lloyd N. Ferguson Young Scientist Award for Excellence in Research
- 2023 American Chemical Society Harry Gray Award for Creative Work in Inorganic Chemistry
- 2023 Robert Holland Jr. Award, Research Corporation for Science Advancement

== Selected publications ==
- Barker, Joshua; Obi, Akachukwu; Dickie, Diane; Gilliard, Robert (2023). "Boron-Doped Pentacenes: Isolation of Crystalline 5,12- and 5,7-Diboratapentacene Dianions". Journal of the American Chemical Society. 145 (4): 2028–2034. Bibcode:2023JAChS.145.2028B. doi:10.1021/jacs.2c11494. PMID 36689632. S2CID 256192152.
- Wentz, Kelsie; Molino, Andrew; Freeman, Lucas; Dickie, Diane; David, Wilson; Gilliard, Robert (2023). "Approaching Dianionic Tetraoxadiborecine Macrocycles: 10-Membered Bora-Crown Ethers Incorporating Borafluorenate Units". Angewandte Chemie International Edition. 62 (5) e202215772. doi:10.1002/anie.202215772. PMID 36437238. S2CID 254043076.
- Wentz, Kelsie; Molino, Andrew; Freeman, Lucas; Dickie, Diane; Wilson, David; Gilliard, Robert (2022). "Activation of Carbon Dioxide by 9-Carbene-9-borafluorene Monoanion: Carbon Monoxide Releasing Transformation of Trioxaborinanone to Luminescent Dioxaborinanone". Journal of the American Chemical Society. 144 (36): 16276–16281. Bibcode:2022JAChS.14416276W. doi:10.1021/jacs.2c06845. PMID 36037435. S2CID 251931742.
- Hollister, Kimberly; Molino, Andrew; Breiner, Grace; Walley, Jacob; Wentz, Kelsie; Conley, Ashley; Dickie, Diane; Wilson, David; Gilliard, Robert (2022). "Air-Stable Thermoluminescent Carbodicarbene-Borafluorenium Ions". Journal of the American Chemical Society. 144 (1): 590–598. Bibcode:2022JAChS.144..590H. doi:10.1021/jacs.1c11861. PMID 35016509. S2CID 245713340.
- Wang, Guocang; Walley, Jacob; Dickie, Diane; Pan, Sudip; Frenking, Gernot; Gilliard, Robert (2020). "A Stable, Crystalline Beryllium Radical Cation". Journal of the American Chemical Society. 142 (10): 4560–4564. Bibcode:2020JAChS.142.4560W. doi:10.1021/jacs.9b13777. PMID 32088963. S2CID 211262005.
