= Delphine Farmer =

Canadian chemist

Delphine Kasimira Farmer
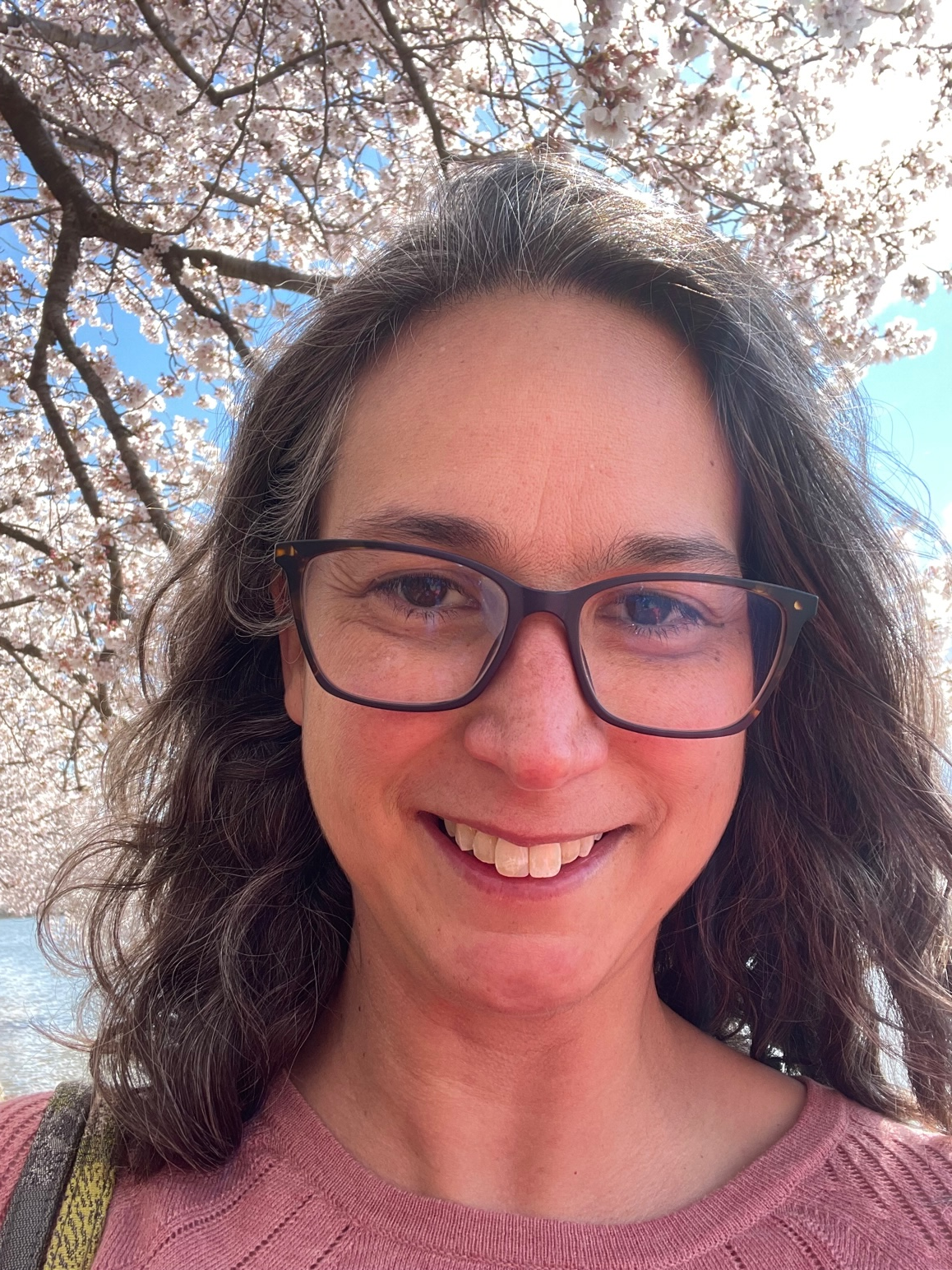
- Farmer at the National Cherry Blossom Festival in 2022
- Education: McGill University; University of California, Berkeley
- Scientific career
- Workplaces: Colorado State University
- Thesis: Biosphere-atmosphere exchange of reactive nitrogen oxides between the atmosphere and a ponderosa pine forest (2007)

Delphine Farmer is a Canadian chemist who is a professor at the Colorado State University. Her research considers the development of scientific instruments for atmospheric science. She was awarded the American Geophysical Union Atmospheric Sciences Ascent Award in 2022.

== Early Life and Education ==
Farmer grew up on Vancouver Island, British Columbia, Canada. Her father, David M. Farmer, was an oceanographer, and she spent her childhood playing in his laboratory. She has credited her love of physics to a high school teacher, and her love of chemistry to an undergraduate lecturer.

Farmer was an undergraduate student at McGill University, and a postgraduate student at the University of California, Berkeley. During her doctoral studies, she spent a year in the Sierra Nevada, where she used mass spectrometry to understand the mountain air. Farmer then moved to the University of Colorado Boulder, spending a month in the Amazon rainforest.

== Research and Career ==
External videos
- "621: Delphine Farmer, PhD – Indoor vs Outdoor Air Chemistry: Cooking, Cleaning and COVID", IAQ Radio, April 2, 2021

In 2011, Farmer joined Colorado State University, leading the aerosols-research group. Farmer studies outdoor and indoor atmospheric chemistry. She looks to understand the sources and sinks of trace gases in the atmosphere. She spent 2014 as a Resident Fellow in the Colorado State University School of Global Environmental Sustainability.

Farmer studies the impact of wildfires on air quality, and has flown through wildfire smoke plumes to monitor scientific instruments. She also used ground-based data from the Atmospheric Radiation Measurement Southern Great Plains observatory. She made her measurements using an ultra-high-sensitivity aerosol spectrometer, which uses a laser to determine the size of aerosol particles.

Farmer was awarded the American Geophysical Union Atmospheric Sciences Ascent Award in 2022 for her work on black carbon deposition, which included field monitoring data from Oliktok Point, Alaska.

During the COVID-19 pandemic, Farmer studied the quality of indoor air and the use of disinfectants. She warned that the inappropriate use of chemicals like bleach and hydrogen peroxide can expose people to breathing toxic molecules. Soap and water were preferable for washing surfaces and were less likely to react with surfaces or materials in air to form toxic chemicals.

Farmer and Marina E. Vance were leaders of the HOMEChem project (House Observations of Microbial and Environmental Chemistry), which studied the indoor environment using a test house at the University of Texas at Austin. Because no one lived in the house, researchers could do controlled studies to observe the effects of specific activities, such as cooking, cleaning, and ventilation. Depending on the order activities that occurred in the house, chemicals from different events reacted to form new chemical products. Researchers used a wide variety of measuring instruments to observe organic compounds and oxidants (e.g. hydroxyl radicals, ozone, and nitrogen oxides).

After the Marshall Fire in Boulder County, Colorado in December 2021, Farmer and others developed the Chemical Assessment of Surfaces and Air study (CASA, 2022) to examine the effects of smoke in homes. They used the Residential Test Facility (RTF) at the National Institute of Standards (NIST) in Gaithersburg, Maryland as a test house. Researchers found that volatile organic compounds (VOCs) from smoke stick to indoor surfaces such as floors, walls, and ceilings. There they build up "reservoirs" which continue to be released back into household air over hours, days, or even months. They continue to interact with other chemicals in the air and on surfaces. Air purifiers could remove some VOCs temporarily from the air, but did not remove smoke VOCs that had attached to surfaces. To remove surface VOCs, scientists vacuumed, dusted and wiped down surfaces using a commercially available bleach-free cleaning solution.

Farmer has also studied the blooming of the Titan arum, or corpse flower, known for its rare flowering and intense stink.

== Selected publications ==
- Li, J; Link, MF; Pandit, S; Webb, MH; Mayer, KJ; Garofalo, LA; Rediger, KL; Poppendieck, DG; Zimmerman, SM; Vance, ME; Grassian, VH; Morrison, GC; Turpin, BJ; Farmer, DK (October 13, 2023). "The persistence of smoke VOCs indoors: Partitioning, surface cleaning, and air cleaning in a smoke-contaminated house". Science Advances. 9 (41) eadh8263. Bibcode:2023SciA....9H8263L. doi:10.1126/sciadv.adh8263. PMC 10575580. PMID 37831770.
- Wang, C; Bottorff, B; Reidy, E; Rosales, CMF; Collins, DB; Novoselac, A; Farmer, DK; Vance, ME; Stevens, PS; Abbatt, JPD (November 3, 2020). "Cooking, Bleach Cleaning, and Air Conditioning Strongly Impact Levels of HONO in a House". Environmental Science & Technology. 54 (21): 13488–13497. Bibcode:2020EnST...5413488W. doi:10.1021/acs.est.0c05356. ISSN 0013-936X. PMID 33064464.
- Wang, C; Collins, DB; Arata, C; Goldstein, AH; Mattila, JM; Farmer, DK; Ampollini, L; DeCarlo, PF; Novoselac, A; Vance, ME; Nazaroff, WW; Abbatt, JPD (February 2020). "Surface reservoirs dominate dynamic gas-surface partitioning of many indoor air constituents". Science Advances. 6 (8) eaay8973. Bibcode:2020SciA....6.8973W. doi:10.1126/sciadv.aay8973. PMC 7030931. PMID 32128415.
- Farmer, DK; Vance, ME; Abbatt, JPD; Abeleira, A; Alves, MR; Arata, C; Boedicker, E; Bourne, S; Cardoso-Saldaña, F; Corsi, R; DeCarlo, PF; Goldstein, AH; Grassian, VH; Ruiz, LH; Jimenez, JL; Kahan, TF; Katz, EF; Mattila, JM; Nazaroff, WW; Novoselac, A; O'Brien, RE; Or, VW; Patel, S; Sankhyan, S; Stevens, PS; Tian, Y; Wade, M; Wang, C; Zhou, S; Zhou, Y (2019). "Overview of HOMEChem: House Observations of Microbial and Environmental Chemistry". Environmental Science: Processes & Impacts. 21 (8): 1280–1300. Bibcode:2019ESPI...21.1280F. doi:10.1039/C9EM00228F. PMID 31328749.
- Pöschl, Ulrich; S T Martin; Baerbel Sinha; et al. (2010). "Rainforest aerosols as biogenic nuclei of clouds and precipitation in the Amazon". Science. 329 (5998): 1513–1516. doi:10.1126/science.1191056. PMID 20847268. Wikidata Q57264108.
- M. J. Cubison; A. M. Ortega; P. L. Hayes; et al. (2011). "Effects of aging on organic aerosol from open biomass burning smoke in aircraft and laboratory studies". Atmospheric Chemistry and Physics. 11 (23): 12049–12064. Bibcode:2011ACP....1112049C. doi:10.5194/acp-11-12049-2011. Wikidata Q59715246.
- C. L. Heald; J. H. Kroll; J. L. Jimenez; et al. (2010). "A simplified description of the evolution of organic aerosol composition in the atmosphere". Geophysical Research Letters. 37 (8). Bibcode:2010GeoRL..37.8803H. doi:10.1029/2010gl042737. Wikidata Q57264099.
