= Paul Cremer =

Paul S. Cremer
- Born: 1967 (age 58–59); United States
- Education: University of Wisconsin–Madison (B.A.), University of California, Berkeley (Ph.D.)
- Known for: Ion-specific effects, biological interfaces, surface chemistry
- Awards: Langmuir Lecture Award (2017), ANACHEM Award (2016), Fellow of the American Chemical Society (2009), Fellow of the American Association for the Advancement of Science (2010)
- Scientific career
- Fields: Physical chemistry, Biophysics, Surface chemistry
- Workplaces: Pennsylvania State University, Texas A&M University
- Doctoral advisor: Gabor A. Somorjai

Paul S. Cremer (born 1967) is an American chemist and biophysicist whose work focuses on ion-specific effects, biological interfaces, and surface chemistry. He is currently the J. Lloyd Huck Chair in Natural Sciences and a Professor of Chemistry and of Biochemistry & Molecular Biology at Pennsylvania State University.

== Early life and education ==
Cremer earned his B.A. from the University of Wisconsin–Madison in 1990. He completed his Ph.D. in Chemistry at the University of California, Berkeley in 1996, under the supervision of Gabor A. Somorjai. He then pursued postdoctoral work at Stanford University (1996–1998) as a Sigal Postdoctoral Fellow, working on supported lipid bilayers and biomembranes.

== Academic career ==
Cremer began his independent academic career at Texas A&M University. He joined as Assistant Professor of Chemistry in 1998, then later Associate Professor and full Professor until 2012. In 2012, he was named Distinguished Professor of Chemistry at Texas A&M. In 2013, he moved to Penn State, accepting the J. Lloyd Huck Chair in Natural Sciences and holding joint appointments in Chemistry and Biochemistry & Molecular Biology.

== Research and contributions ==
Cremer’s research sits at the intersection of physical chemistry, analytical chemistry, and biophysics, with a strong emphasis on the molecular-level behavior of ions, interfaces, and membranes. Some of his key themes include: Ion specific (Hofmeister) effects on proteins, polymers, and macromolecules in aqueous systems. Supported lipid bilayers, biomembrane interfaces, and how ions interact with or perturb these systems. Surface and interfacial spectroscopy (e.g. sum-frequency generation) and microfluidic / lab-on-chip platforms to probe interface phenomena. Investigations into how weakly hydrated anions interact preferentially with macromolecules, and how the size, shape, and hydration of ions modulate adsorption behavior. He leads the Cremer Research Group at Penn State, which works on sensing, nanomaterials, surface chemistry, and interface biophysics. He has been PI or co-PI on grants in areas such as ion mobility in aqueous systems, ion adsorption to polymers and interfaces, and development of biosensor platforms. His work is highly cited: his Google Scholar profile indicates large citation counts and a strong impact in his fields. As of Oct. 2025, his number of publications listed on Google Scholar profile is 320, received ~30500 citations. This productivity and citation impact place him among the most influential scientists globally, ranked high among the world's top 2% scientists, a list created by a Stanford research group.

== Honors, awards, and service ==
Prof. Cremer has received a number of distinguished honors: Langmuir Lecture Award, American Chemical Society (2017), ANACHEM Award (2016), Pittcon Lecturer (2016), J. Lloyd Huck Chair in Natural Sciences, Penn State (2013), Distinguished Professor, Texas A&M University (2012) Fellow of the American Association for the Advancement of Science (2010), Fellow of the American Chemical Society (2009), Arthur E. Martell Chair of Chemistry (2007), Camille Dreyfus Teacher-Scholar Award (2003), Alfred P. Sloan Research Fellow (2002), Beckman Young Investigator Award (2001), NSF CAREER Award (2001), Office of Naval Research Young Investigator Award (2000), 3M Nontenured Faculty Award, Research Corporation Innovation Award, and others for early-stage research recognition.

== Google Scholar Profile ==
- Google Scholar Profile
