= Kim Orth =

American biochemist

- Education: Texas A&M University; UCLA School of Medicine; University of Texas Southwestern Medical Center
- Scientific career
- Workplaces: University of Texas Southwestern Medical Center

Kim Orth is a microbiologist and biochemist. She is the Earl A. Forsythe chair in biomedical science and professor of molecular biology and biochemistry at UT Southwestern. She is a Howard Hughes Medical Institute investigator and a member of the National Academy of Sciences. Her research focuses on bacterial pathogenesis.

Kim Orth graduated from Texas A&M University in 1984 with a B.S. in biochemistry. She went to the UCLA School of Medicine for an M.S. in biological chemistry, and then to University of Texas Southwestern Medical Center for a PhD in biochemistry and molecular biology.

== History and research ==
After obtaining her PhD in Biological Chemistry at UT Southwestern Medical Center, she moved with her husband to the University of Michigan. Over the course of 7 years at University of Michigan, she had multiple productive postdocs in various fields while becoming a working mother of two. During her final postdoc at the University of Michigan, she discovered the field of host-pathogen interactions. After two years of working in this field, she accepted faculty position in 2001 at UT Southwestern Medical Center in the Department of Molecular Biology, and became an Earl A. Forsythe Chair in Biomedical Science.

Over the years, she worked in labs doing protein chemistry, Drosophilia genetics, cell biology, biochemistry and molecular microbial genetics. Using these tools, Dr. Orth developed a program to identify bacterial virulence factors and uncover their molecular activity.

== Awards ==
- 2003 Beckman Young Investigators
- 2006 Burroughs Wellcome Investigator in Pathogenesis of Infectious Disease
- 2012 ASBMB Young Investigator Award
- 2016 Elected fellow of the American Academy of Microbiology
- 2018 ASBMB Merck Award
- 2020 National Academy of Sciences
- 2026 ASBMB Earl and Thressa Stadtman Distinguished Scientist Award
