= Potassium tris(3,5-dimethyl-1-pyrazolyl)borate =

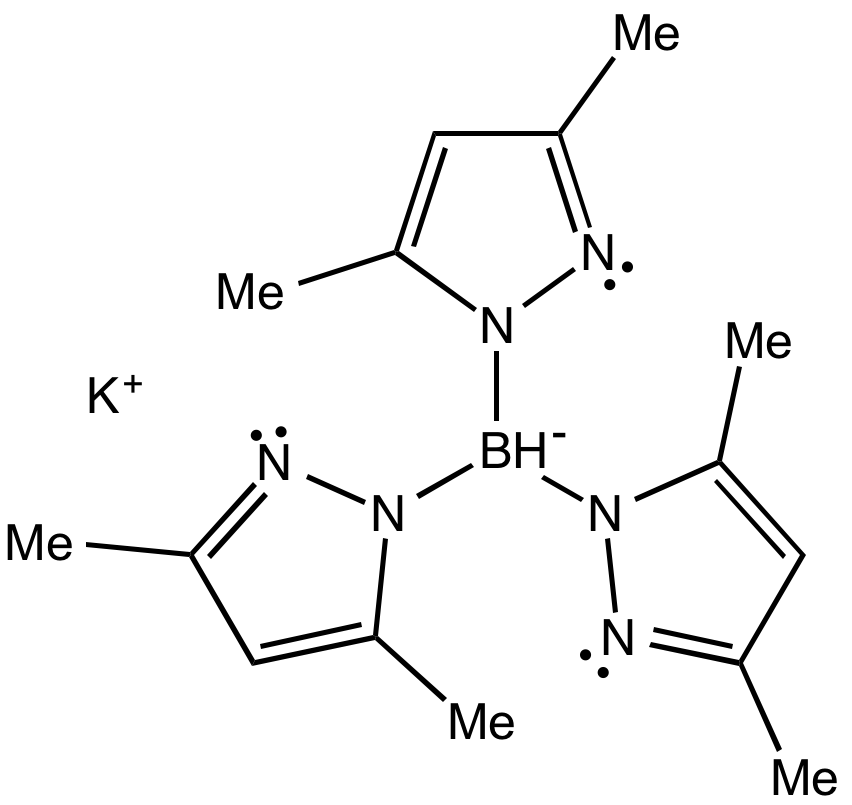

Names
- IUPAC name Potassium tri(3,5-dimethyl-1-pyrazolyl)borohydride
- Other names Tp* ligand

Identifiers
CAS Number	17567-17-8
3D model (JSmol)	Interactive image
ChemSpider	2007
ECHA InfoCard	100.203.488
EC Number	678-433-5
PubChem CID	23663216
CompTox Dashboard (EPA)	DTXSID60635418
- InChI: InChI=1S/C15H22BN6.K/c1-10-7-13(4)20(17-10)16(21-14(5)8-11(2)18-21)22-15(6)9-12(3)19-22;/h7-9,16H,1-6H3;/q-1;+1 Key: NTWZGFNSHCFHIJ-UHFFFAOYSA-N
- SMILES: [BH-](n1c(cc(n1)C)C)(n2c(cc(n2)C)C)n3c(cc(n3)C)C.[K+]

Properties
Chemical formula	C_{15}H_{22}BKN_{6}
Molar mass	336.28 gmol_{−1}
Appearance	White solid
Melting point	292 to 301 °C (558 to 574 °F; 565 to 574 K)
- Except where otherwise noted, data are given for materials in their standard state (at 25 °C [77 °F], 100 kPa). Infobox references

Potassium tris(3,5-dimethyl-1-pyrazolyl)borate, abbreviated KTp*, is the potassium salt of the anion HB((CH_{3})_{2}C_{3}N_{2}H)_{3}. Tp*^{−} is a tripodal ligand that binds to a metal in a facial manner, more specifically a Scorpionate ligand. KTp* is a white crystalline solid that is soluble in polar solvents, including water and several alcohols.

== Synthesis ==
KTp* is synthesized in a manner similar to that of KTp by the reaction of potassium borohydride and 3,5-dimethylpyrazole. Hydrogen gas is evolved as each of the pyrazole reacts at the boron. The rate of B-N bond formation becomes more difficult with each successive 3,5-dimethylpyrazolyl due to the increase in steric hindrance around the boron:

3 Me_{2}C_{3}N_{2}H_{2} + KBH_{4} → KHB(Me_{2}C_{3}N_{2}H)_{3} + 3 H_{2}

The required dimethylpyrazole is obtained by condensation of hydrazine and acetylacetone.

== Role as ligand ==
The active binding sites in Tp*^{−} are the three nitrogen centers that are not bonded to the boron. Although more weakly binding than cyclopentadienyl ligands, Tp*^{−} is still a tightly coordinating. The benefit of Tp*^{−} over its sister compound Tp^{−} is the addition of the methyl groups on the pyrazolyl rings, which increases the steric hindrance of the ligand enough that only one Tp*^{−} can bind to a metal. This leaves the remaining coordination sites available for catalysis.

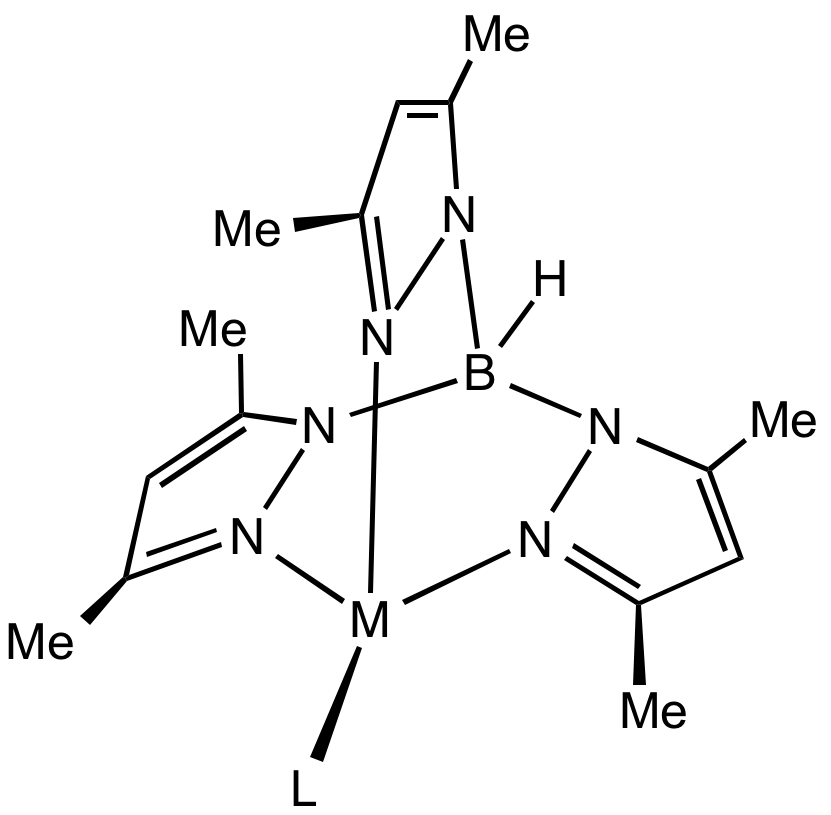
Structure of generic Tp*M complex illustrating the steric protection afforded by the methyl groups.
