= Trisoxazolines =

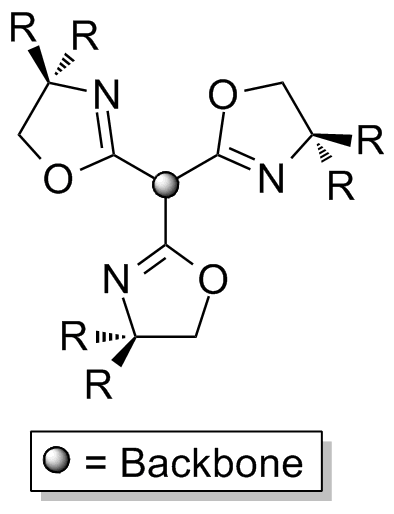
The general structure of trisoxazoline

Trisoxazolines (Often abbreviated TRISOX or TOX) are a class of tridentate, chiral ligands composed of three oxazoline rings. Despite being neutral they are able to form stable complexes with high oxidation state metals, such as rare earths, due to the chelate effect. The ligands have been investigated for molecular recognition and their complexes are used in asymmetric catalysts and polymerisation.

== Synthesis ==
Trisoxazolines can either be synthesised directly, from suitable tripodal starting materials, or built up in a modular manner. These approaches can be used to give ligands of differing symmetries, with the direct synthesis route giving homochiral ligands with C_{3} rotational symmetry and the modular approach typically being used to give asymmetric compounds (C_{1} symmetry), which are either heterochiral or possess a mix of both chiral and achiral groups. These differences in symmetry can significantly effect the coordination chemistry of the ligands and the catalytic activity of their complexes, with C_{3} symmetric ligands often being better for asymmetric catalysis.

=== Direct methods ===
Suitable tripodal compounds, such as trimesic acid and nitrilotriacetic acid, can be converted directly to trisoxazolines. The simplicity of this approach is beneficial, however it only allows a limited variety of structures to be produced, due to the limited range of available starting materials.

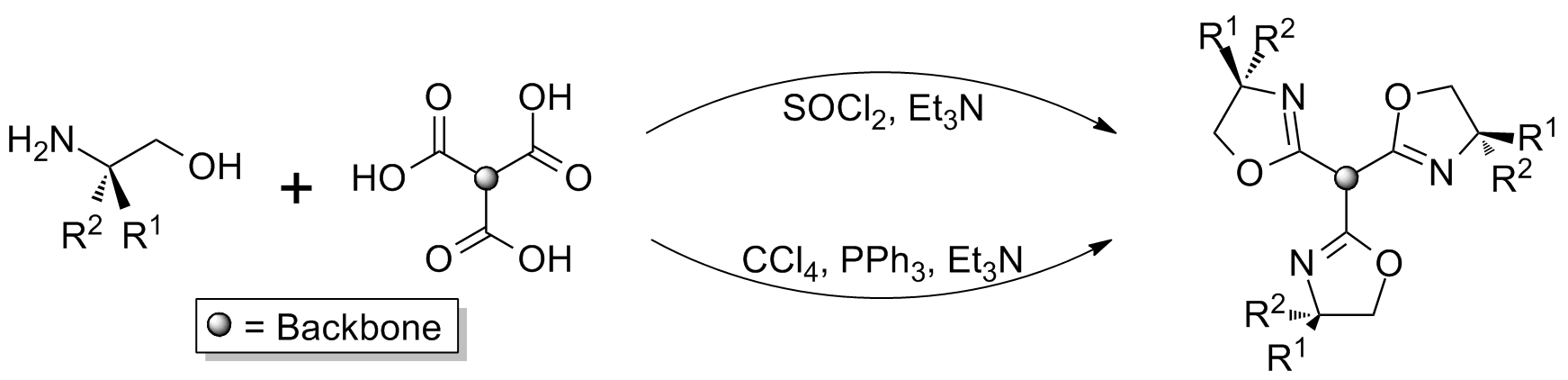

=== Modular methods ===
Modular synthesis allows for a more diverse range of structures, however the multi-step reactions can result in lower overall yields. In general synthesis involves the generation of separate mono‑oxazoline (typically halogenated) and bis-oxazoline units, which are then coupled using a strong base such as ^{t}BuLi or KN(SiMe_{3})_{2}.

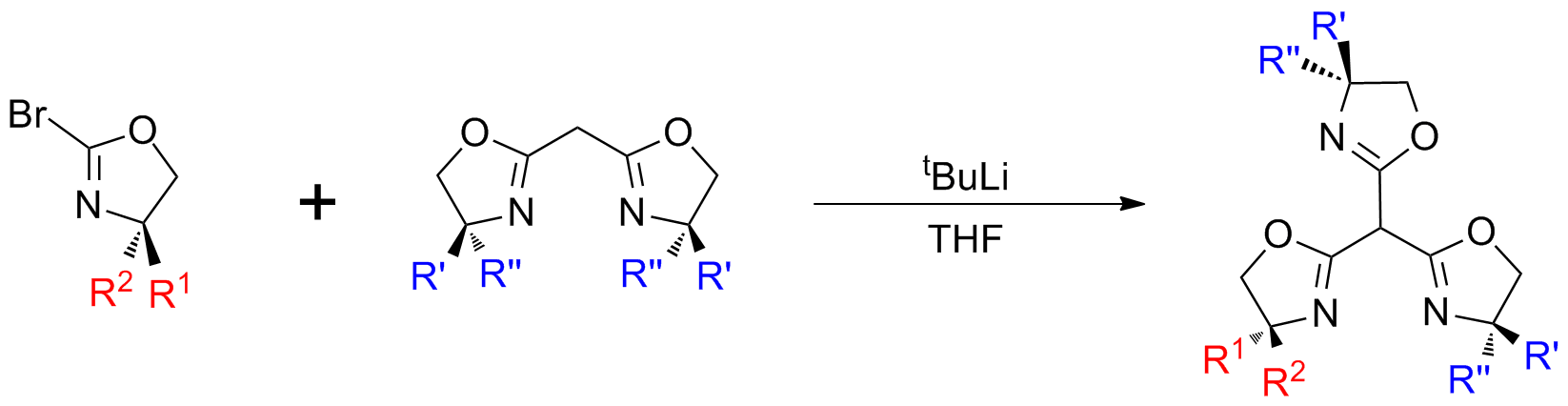

In addition to the inclusion of heterochirality, modular synthesis also allows for the synthesis of 'lopsided' structures which have application as scorpionate ligands.

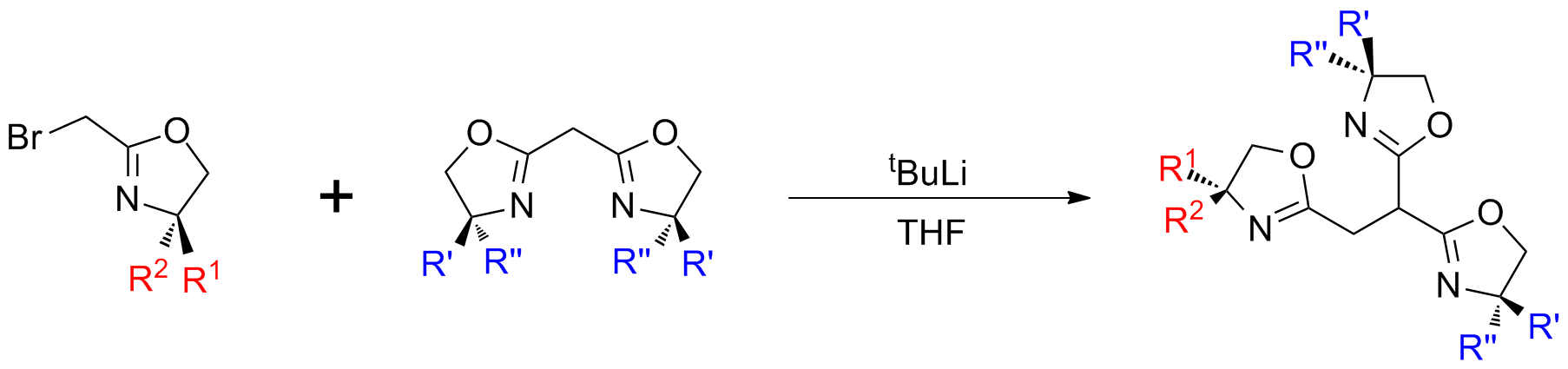

== In catalysis ==
=== Friedel–Crafts reaction ===
Trisoxazolines have been used for the copper catalysed Friedel–Crafts alkylation of indoles, largely with alkylidene malonates, with good yields and ee's reported. A number of interesting solvent effects have also been observed, including a relationship between enantioselectivity and the steric bulk of the solvent when using of alcohols and a reversal of enantioselectivity when changing the reaction solvent from coordinating solvents to weakly coordinating solvents.

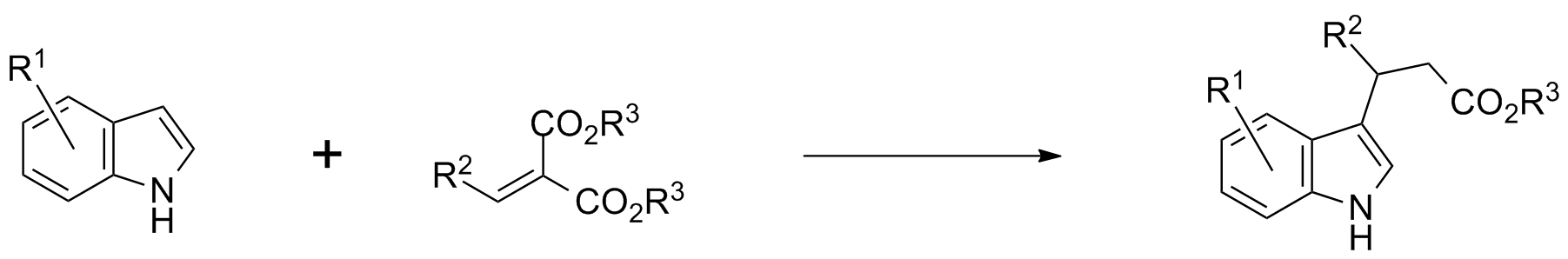

=== Polymerisation ===
Rare-earth complexes incorporating TRISOX ligands have been found to be highly effective catalysts for the polymerisation of α-alkenes and are notable for producing polyolefins with very high tacticities. Computational modelling of the polymerisation mechanism indicates that kinetic factors likely account for the high tacticity.

== Molecular recognition ==
Trisoxazolines baring a benzene backbone have been investigated for molecular recognition and have shown promising selectivity for the recognition of ammonium alkylammonium and sugar species, including examples of chiral recognition.

== See also ==
- Bisoxazoline ligands (BOX)
- Phosphinooxazolines (PHOX)
- Trisoxazolinylborate
- Trispyrazolylborate
