= Phox =

Phox may refer to:

- Phox (band)
- PhoX, a proof assistant based on high order logic
- PHOX2A, a protein
- PHOX2B, a protein
- Phosphinooxazolines, a class of chiral ligands commonly abbreviated as PHOX
  - (S)-iPr-PHOX, a specific PHOX ligand
