= Pyrazolidine =

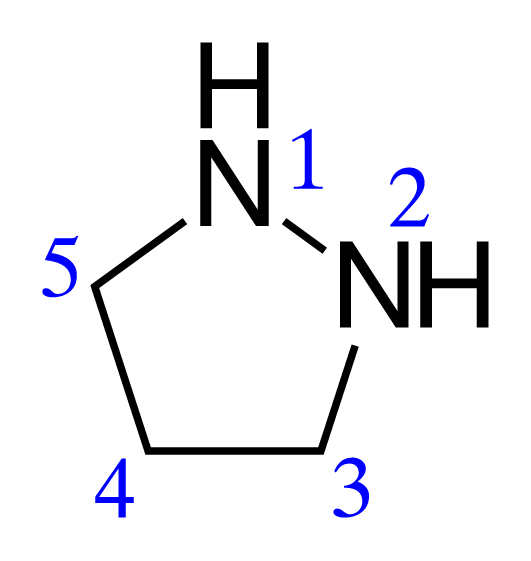

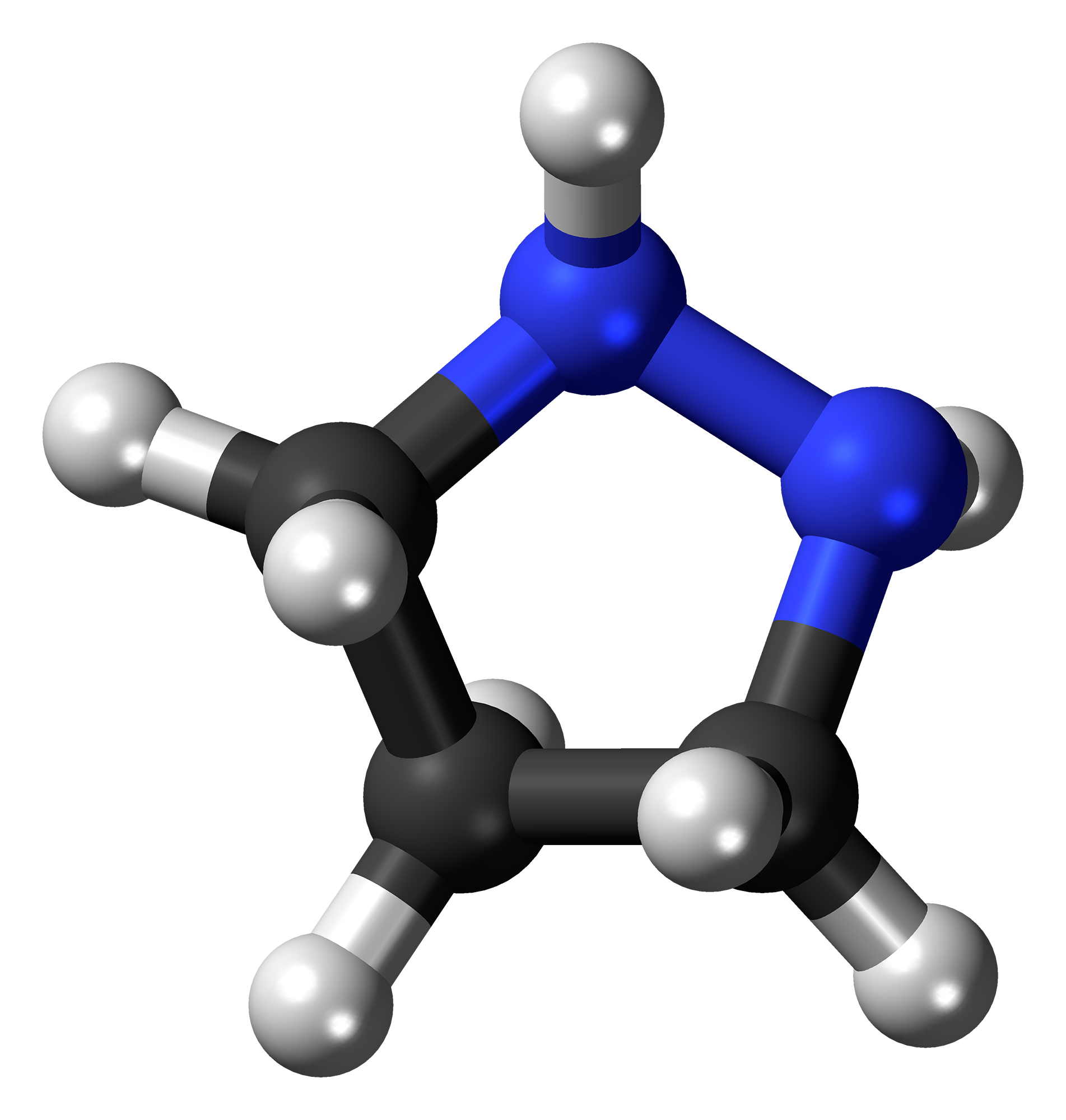

Names
- Preferred IUPAC name Pyrazolidine
- Other names 1,2-Diazolidine

Identifiers
CAS Number	504-70-1
3D model (JSmol)	Interactive image
ChEBI	CHEBI:33138
ChemSpider	71365
PubChem CID	79033
UNII	Y0MA3161MR
CompTox Dashboard (EPA)	DTXSID30198444
- InChI: InChI=1S/C3H8N2/c1-2-4-5-3-1/h4-5H,1-3H2 Key: USPWKWBDZOARPV-UHFFFAOYSA-N; InChI=1/C3H8N2/c1-2-4-5-3-1/h4-5H,1-3H2 Key: USPWKWBDZOARPV-UHFFFAOYAM
- SMILES: C1CNNC1

Properties
Chemical formula	C_{3}H_{8}N_{2}
Molar mass	72.10902
Density	1.00 g/cm^{3} (20 °C)
Melting point	10 to 12 °C (50 to 54 °F; 283 to 285 K)
Boiling point	138 °C (280 °F; 411 K)
Refractive index (n_{D})	1.477
- Except where otherwise noted, data are given for materials in their standard state (at 25 °C [77 °F], 100 kPa). verify (what is ?) Infobox references

Pyrazolidine is a heterocyclic compound. It is a liquid that is stable in air, but it is hygroscopic.

== Preparation ==
Pyrazolidine can be produced by cyclization of 1,3-dichloropropane or 1,3-dibromopropane with hydrazine:

Cl−(CH_{2})_{3}−Cl + N_{2}H_{4} → C_{3}H_{8}N_{2} + 2 HCl
Br−(CH_{2})_{3}−Br + N_{2}H_{4} → C_{3}H_{8}N_{2} + 2 HBr

== See also ==
- Pyrazole
- Pyrazoline
