= Potassium trispyrazolylborate =

Names
- Preferred IUPAC name Potassium tri(1H-pyrazol-1-yl)boranuide

Identifiers
CAS Number	18583-60-3
3D model (JSmol)	Interactive image; Interactive image
ChemSpider	2007131
ECHA InfoCard	100.203.487
PubChem CID	2725019
CompTox Dashboard (EPA)	DTXSID00635417
- InChI: InChI=1S/C9H10BN6.K/c1-4-11-14(7-1)10(15-8-2-5-12-15)16-9-3-6-13-16;/h1-10H;/q-1;+1 Key: IBNGZWIUPDMZMG-UHFFFAOYSA-N; InChI=1/C9H10BN6.K/c1-4-11-14(7-1)10(15-8-2-5-12-15)16-9-3-6-13-16;/h1-10H;/q-1;+1 Key: IBNGZWIUPDMZMG-UHFFFAOYAZ
- SMILES: [H][B-](N1N=CC=C1)(N2N=CC=C2)N3N=CC=C3.[K+]; [BH-](n1cccn1)(n2cccn2)n3cccn3.[K+]

Properties
Chemical formula	C_{9}H_{10}BKN_{6}
Molar mass	252.13 g·mol^{−1}
Melting point	188 to 189 °C (370 to 372 °F; 461 to 462 K)
- Except where otherwise noted, data are given for materials in their standard state (at 25 °C [77 °F], 100 kPa). verify (what is ?) Infobox references

Potassium trispyrazolylborate, commonly abbreviated KTp, is the potassium salt with the formula KHB(C_{3}N_{2}H_{3})_{3}. This salt is the source of the trispyrazolylborate ligand.

KTp is a white crystalline solid that is soluble in polar solvents, alcohols, and water. The synthesis of KTp involves potassium borohydride and pyrazole without a solvent.

KBH_{4} + 3 C_{3}N_{2}H_{4} → KHB(C_{3}N_{2}H_{3})_{3} + 3 H_{2}

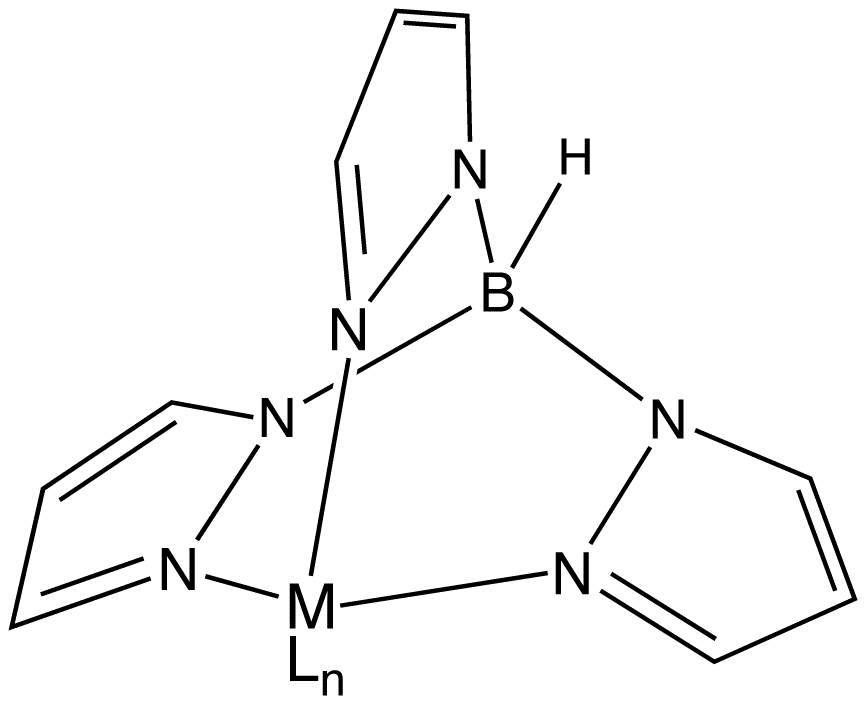
Idealized structure of a Tp ligand bound to a metal center ML_{n}.

The tris(pyrazolyl)borate forms octahedral coordination compounds with the formula M[Tp]_{2} with first-row transition metals. KTp also forms 1:1 complexes, for example it can be converted to K[TpMo(CO)_{3}];

KTp + Mo(CO)_{6} → K[TpMo(CO)_{3}] + 3 CO

When K[TpMo(CO)_{3}] is treated with butyl nitrite it yields the neutral orange complex TpMo(CO)_{2}NO.

K[TpMo(CO)_{3}] + BuONO → TpMo(CO)_{2}NO + CO + KOBu
