= Valinol =

Names
- Preferred IUPAC name (2S)-2-Amino-3-methylbutan-1-ol
- Other names (S)-(+)-2-Amino-3-methyl-1-butanol

Identifiers
CAS Number	16369-05-4 (DL); 2026-48-4 (L); 4276-09-9 (D)
3D model (JSmol)	(DL): Interactive image; (L): Interactive image; (D): Interactive image
ChemSpider	71352 (DL); 556322 (L); 5323522 (D)
ECHA InfoCard	100.036.734
PubChem CID	79019 (DL); 640993 (L); 6950587 (D)
UNII	F4FX82ATU2
CompTox Dashboard (EPA)	DTXSID70862814
- InChI: (DL): InChI=1S/C5H13NO/c1-4(2)5(6)3-7/h4-5,7H,3,6H2,1-2H3 Key: NWYYWIJOWOLJNR-UHFFFAOYSA-N; (L): InChI=1S/C5H13NO/c1-4(2)5(6)3-7/h4-5,7H,3,6H2,1-2H3/t5-/m1/s1 Key: NWYYWIJOWOLJNR-RXMQYKEDSA-N; (D): InChI=1S/C5H13NO/c1-4(2)5(6)3-7/h4-5,7H,3,6H2,1-2H3/t5-/m0/s1 Key: NWYYWIJOWOLJNR-YFKPBYRVSA-N
- SMILES: (DL): CC(C)C(CO)N; (L): CC(C)[C@@H](CO)N; (D): CC(C)[C@H](CO)N

Properties
Chemical formula	C_{5}H_{13}NO
Molar mass	103.165 g·mol^{−1}
Appearance	White to yellow crystalline powder
Density	0.926 g/mL
Melting point	30 to 34 °C (86 to 93 °F; 303 to 307 K)
Boiling point	189 to 190 °C (372 to 374 °F; 462 to 463 K)
Solubility in water	Very soluble

Hazards
- GHS labelling
Pictograms	(GHS07: Exclamation mark)
Signal word	Warning
Hazard statements	H315, H319, H335
Precautionary statements	P261, P305+P351+P338
Flash point	90°C closed cup
Safety data sheet (SDS)	Sigma Aldrich
- Except where otherwise noted, data are given for materials in their standard state (at 25 °C [77 °F], 100 kPa). Infobox references

Valinol is an organic compound named after, and commonly produced from, the amino acid valine. The compound is chiral and is produced almost exclusively as the S‑isomer (also designated as the L‑isomer), due to the abundant supply of S-valine. It is part of a broader class of amino alcohols.

== Synthesis ==
Valinol can be generated by converting the carboxylic group of valine to an alcohol with a strong reducing agent such as lithium aluminium hydride, or with NaBH_{4} and I_{2} (forming the borane–tetrahydrofuran complex). In both cases the valinol produced can be subsequently purified by short path distillation.

== Reactions ==
Valinol is mainly used to prepare chiral oxazolines, a process which can be achieved via a variety of methods. These oxazolines are principally used as ligands in asymmetric catalysis.

== See also ==
- (S)-iPr-PHOX - an oxazoline ligand made using valinol
