= Phosphinooxazolines =

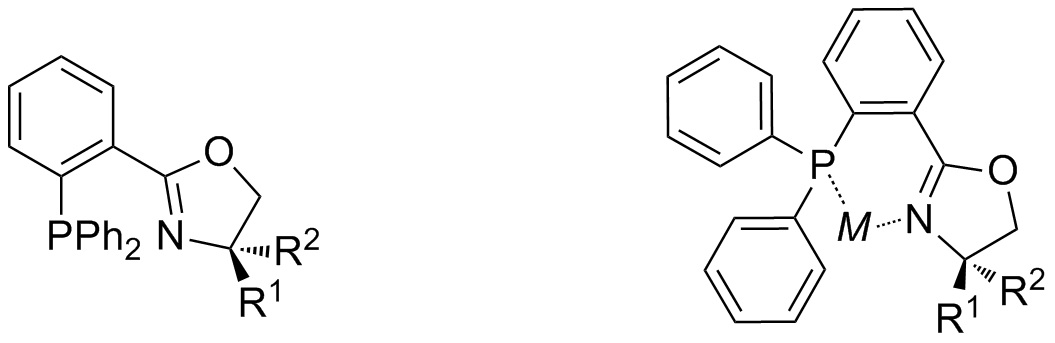
Chiral phosphinooxazoline (PHOX) in its free and coordinated forms

Phosphinooxazolines (often abbreviated PHOX) are a class of chiral ligands used in asymmetric catalysis. Colorless solids, PHOX ligands feature a tertiary phosphine group, often diphenyl, and an oxazoline ligand in the ortho position. The oxazoline, which carries the stereogenic center, coordinates through nitrogen, the result being that PHOX ligands are P,N-chelating ligands. Most phosphine ligands used in asymmetric catalysis are diphosphines, so the PHOX ligands are distinctive. Some evidence exists that PHOX ligands are hemilabile.

== Synthesis ==
The synthesis of phosphinooxazolines is modular. Methods exist for installing the phosphine ligand before the oxazoline and the reverse. Commonly a phenyloxazoline is combined with a source of diphenylphosphine. Methods for doing this depend on the nature of the substituent in the X position:

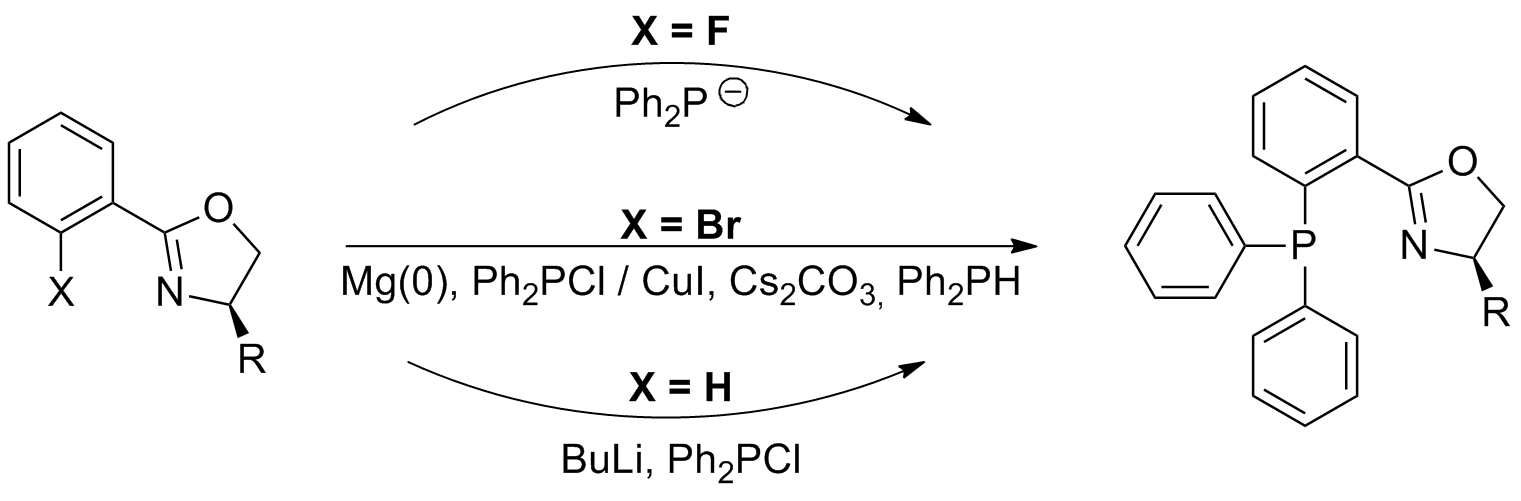

- When X = fluorine coupling involves anionic displacement with a alkali metal diphenylphosphide.
- 2-Bromoaryl oxazolines can be converted into a Grignard reagent, which react with chlorodiphenylphosphine. Alternatively, the aryl bromide can be coupled with diphenylphosphine via a copper iodide-catalysed reaction.
- Aryl oxazolines undergo directed ortho lithiation, and the resulting 2-lithio derivative then can be treated with chlorodiphenylphosphine.

Of these methods, the copper iodide catalysed reaction method is popular.

== Catalysis ==
Phosphinooxazoline complexes have been widely tested in homogeneous catalysis.

=== Allylic substitutions ===
PHOX-based palladium complexes catalyse enantioselective allylic substitutions.

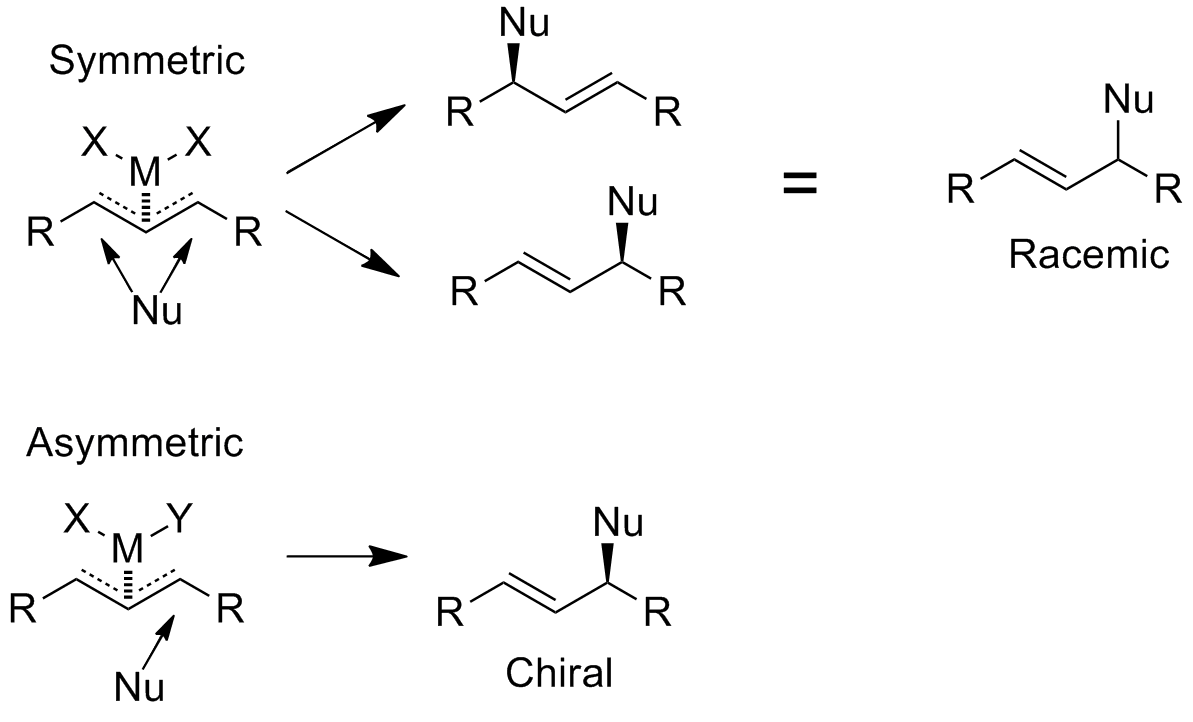

Substitutions include allylic alkylations (Tsuji-Trost reaction), aminations, and sulfonylations.

=== Heck Reaction ===

Palladium complexes containing chiral phosphinooxazolines are efficient catalysts for the Heck reaction. Pd-PHOX catalysts have also been used for intramolecular Heck reactions and examples exist where they have been shown to be superior to more common ligands such as BINAP.

=== Asymmetric Hydrogenation ===
In asymmetric hydrogenation iridium complexes of phosphinooxazolines catalyse 'classic' hydrogenation. Related ruthenium and palladium catalysts effect transfer hydrogenation. In addition to theoretical studies, the structural and kinetic properties

== See also ==
Other oxazoline based ligands

- (S)-iPr-PHOX - A specific PHOX ligand
- Bisoxazolines (BOX)
- Trisoxazolines (TRISOX)

Structurally related ligands

- Trost ligand
- Diphenyl-2-pyridylphosphine
