= Polyoxazolines =

Polyoxazolines are a class of biopolymers formed from oxazolines, which are 5 membered rings containing nitrogen and oxygen. These polymers can be utilized in a variety of potential biomedical applications, such as drug conjugation for targeted drug delivery and other nanomaterials. Research has noted their particularly stealthy nature, which is defined as a lack of an immunogenic response when utilized in vivo.

== Overview of biopolymers ==
Natural and synthetic polymers, such as cellulose, collagen, biodegradable poly(ethylene glycol) (PEG), and others have widely been used in biomedical engineering. A popular biopolymer choice is PEG, and the conjugation of biopharmaceuticals to PEG is a process called PEGylation which has led to a number of important macromolecule drugs through modulation of their therapeutic properties. An alternative to PEG for use in biopolymers is Poly(2-oxazoline), or POx, which possesses an R group which can be modified unlike PEG. A similar alternative is Poly(6-oxazine), which utilizes 6 membered rings instead of 5 membered rings, which also can be utilized for biomedical applications.

== History and development ==
Oxazolines are a type of cyclic imino ethers that comprise a five-membered ring. For the synthesis of POx, a living cationic ring-opening polymerization method (CROP) is utilized. This CROP synthesis was first discovered in 1956, when Swarc reported the first living polymerization, in which the termination of the polymer chain is controlled, opening up the field of living polymerizations. In 1966 and 1967, four different research groups reported the first utilization of this CROP synthesis for synthesizing POx specifically. In 1966, POx was introduced as an FDA approved food additive, due to its nontoxicity.

== Synthesis ==
In this synthesis 2-oxazoline attacks an initiator functionalized with a counter anion, X, to create a cationic intermediate after the initiation step. This intermediate is then attacked by another 2-oxazoline in the propagation step. Finally, the polymerization ends in the termination step with attack on the cationic 2-oxazoline with a terminator. Change of the initiator can implement a variety of different functional groups into the polymer. The common types of initiators include methyl 4-nitro(methyl)benzenesulfonate, methyl trifluoromethanesulfonate, chloroformate, acid halide, and brominated hydrocarbon. The terminator can also be used to implement various functionalities, and since this is added at the end of the synthesis, this can be utilized to introduce CROP incompatible groups into the polymer through their side chains. Many different terminators are commonly utilized, such as hydroxyl or amino, which can attenuate solubility or later be utilized in conjugation. Furthermore, the living nature of the polymerization enables control over areas such as molecular weight and molar mass distribution.

Generic overview of the CROP synthesis

== General properties ==
POx have a wide range of physical properties which are applicable for biomedical uses. POx are stable at high temperatures, enabling broad temperature range usability. Additionally, their tertiary amide-bearing backbone provides enhanced stability against oxidative degradation. POx can be also modulated with a variety of hydrophilic and hydrophobic monomers to attenuate solubility. Different POx can be attenuated to possess different lower critical solution temperatures (LCST), contributing to their solubility and miscibility in a variety of organic solvents and aqueous solutions. In addition, some POx can possess strong thermo-responsivity, enabling use of POx in cell sheet engineering.

Varying hydrophobicity of different POx molecules and comparison to polypeptides

POx has differentiated itself from the popular choice of PEG for use in biopolymers. Anti-PEG antibodies have been observed in a significant number of patients, including 25% of patients never treated with PEG drugs, possibly due to its ubiquity in cosmetics and food additives. This immunogenic response could contribute to accelerated blood clearance after multiple injections. POx has found attention in this regard; it does not illicit an immunogenic response. POx exhibit a peptidomimetic structure composed of a tertiary amide backbone, but unlike natural polypeptides, POx cannot be degraded by proteases. In addition to its biocompatibility, POx has been shown to exhibit higher stability and tunability than PEG with the presence of its third functional R group handle. Furthermore, POx can be utilized for the fabrication of antifouling coatings, which can be resistant to physiological conditions for longer periods with respect to their PEG analogues. For solubility, POx can be tuned to be more hydrophilic than PEG, which can help in therapeutics and drug delivery.

== Utilization ==
Example of Micelle for Hydrophobic Compound Delivery using POx Polymers

POx can be utilized in a variety of nanomaterials. POx can be used for the creation of biocompatible surfactants. POx can also be utilized in micelles for the facilitation of hydrophobic compound delivery in aqueous solutions (Figure 4). Research has reported that POx can possess self assembly properties and can form micelles. A different utilization for POx is in hydrogels, which can form spherical nanogels in aqueous solutions for drug delivery. These three-dimensional structures, formed through crosslinking polymers, provide an opportunity to model the complex and transformable environment of the extra cellular membrane. Furthermore, these POx hydrogels can be used to created water-stable scaffolds. For other nanomaterial uses, POx can be used in functionalized nanoparticles with a variety of materials, such as Au. These nanoparticles can be utilized for targeted drug delivery. POx can be used in microgels, which can be useful for neuronal cell culture.

Example of POx Protein/Drug Conjugates Functionalized with Imaging Material for in vivo imaging

POx can be used in covalent protein/drug conjugates. Similarly to how PEG can be covalently linked with proteins for targeted drug delivery, POx can be utilized for the same purpose. In addition, imaging material can be conjugated for use in in vivo imaging. These functionalizations can be facilitated through POx’s well documented compatibility with Copper Catalyzed Click reactions. Overall, this strategy has showcased promising initial results for use in cancer detection.
