= Aminomethyl propanol =

Names
- Preferred IUPAC name 2-Amino-2-methylpropan-1-ol
- Other names Isobutanol-2-amine; Aminoisobutanol; 2-Amino-2-methyl-1-propanol

Identifiers
CAS Number	124-68-5
3D model (JSmol)	Interactive image
ChemSpider	13835861
ECHA InfoCard	100.004.282
PubChem CID	11807
UNII	LU49E6626Q
CompTox Dashboard (EPA)	DTXSID8027032
- InChI: InChI=1S/C4H11NO/c1-4(2,5)3-6/h6H,3,5H2,1-2H3 Key: CBTVGIZVANVGBH-UHFFFAOYSA-N
- SMILES: CC(C)(CO)N

Properties
Chemical formula	C_{4}H_{11}NO
Molar mass	89.138 g·mol^{−1}
Density	0.934 g/cm^{3}
Melting point	30–31 °C (86–88 °F; 303–304 K)
Boiling point	165.5 °C (329.9 °F; 438.6 K)
Solubility in water	Miscible
Solubility in alcohols	Soluble

Hazards
- Occupational safety and health (OHS/OSH)
Main hazards	Irritant
- GHS labelling
Pictograms	(GHS07: Exclamation mark)
Signal word	Warning
Hazard statements	H315, H319, H412
Precautionary statements	P264, P264+P265, P273, P280, P302+P352, P305+P351+P338, P321, P332+P317, P337+P317, P362+P364, P501
NFPA 704 (fire diamond)	2 2 0
- Except where otherwise noted, data are given for materials in their standard state (at 25 °C [77 °F], 100 kPa). Infobox references

Aminomethyl propanol (AMP) is an organic compound with the formula H_{2}NC(CH_{3})_{2}CH_{2}OH. It is colorless liquid that is classified as an alkanolamine. It is a useful buffer and a precursor to numerous other organic compounds.

Aminomethyl propanol is typically sold as a solution of the material in water, for which different concentrations are available.

== Synthesis ==
Aminomethyl propanol can be produced by the hydrogenation of 2-aminoisobutyric acid or its esters.

== Properties ==
Aminomethyl propanol is soluble in water and about the same density as water.

== Uses ==
Aminomethyl propanol is used for the preparation of buffer solutions. It is a component of the drugs ambuphylline and pamabrom. It is also used in cosmetics.

It is a precursor to oxazolines via its reaction with acyl chlorides. Via sulfation of the alcohol, the compound is also a precursor to 2,2-dimethylaziridine.

Aminomethyl propanol is used as an intermediate the synthesis of fepradinol, isobucaine, and radafaxine. Tucatinib is another use.
