= Ambuphylline =

Names
- IUPAC name 1,3-dimethyl-7H-purine-2,6-dione : 2-amino-2-methylpropan-1-ol
- Other names Theophylline aminoisobutanol, bufylline

Identifiers
| CAS Number | 5634-34-4 |
| 3D model (JSmol) | Interactive image |
| ChEMBL | ChEMBL2104089 |
| ChemSpider | 20536 |
| ECHA InfoCard | 100.024.616 |
| KEGG | D02884 |
| PubChem CID | 21850 |
| UNII | VOU5V0B772 |
| CompTox Dashboard (EPA) | DTXSID60204880 |
- InChI: InChI=1S/C7H8N4O2.C4H11NO/c1-10-5-4(8-3-9-5)6(12)11(2)7(10)13;1-4(2,5)3-6/h3H,1-2H3,(H,8,9);6H,3,5H2,1-2H3 Key: SEIRRUDMPNNSCY-UHFFFAOYSA-N; InChI=1/C7H8N4O2.C4H11NO/c1-10-5-4(8-3-9-5)6(12)11(2)7(10)13;1-4(2,5)3-6/h3H,1-2H3,(H,8,9);6H,3,5H2,1-2H3 Key: SEIRRUDMPNNSCY-UHFFFAOYAX
- SMILES: O=C2N(c1nc[nH]c1C(=O)N2C)C.OCC(N)(C)C

Properties
| Chemical formula | C_{11}H_{19}N_{5}O_{3} |
| Molar mass | 269.30 g/mol |
| Appearance | Crystalline, slightly yellowish white powder |
| Melting point | 254 to 256 °C (489 to 493 °F; 527 to 529 K) |
| Solubility in water | Freely soluble. |

Pharmacology
| ATC code | R03DA10 (WHO) |
- Except where otherwise noted, data are given for materials in their standard state (at 25 °C [77 °F], 100 kPa). verify (what is ?) Infobox references

Ambuphylline (or bufylline) is a combination of theophylline and aminoisobutanol used as a bronchodilator. It also acts and may be used as a diuretic.
