= Crossmember =

Structural component in motor vehicles

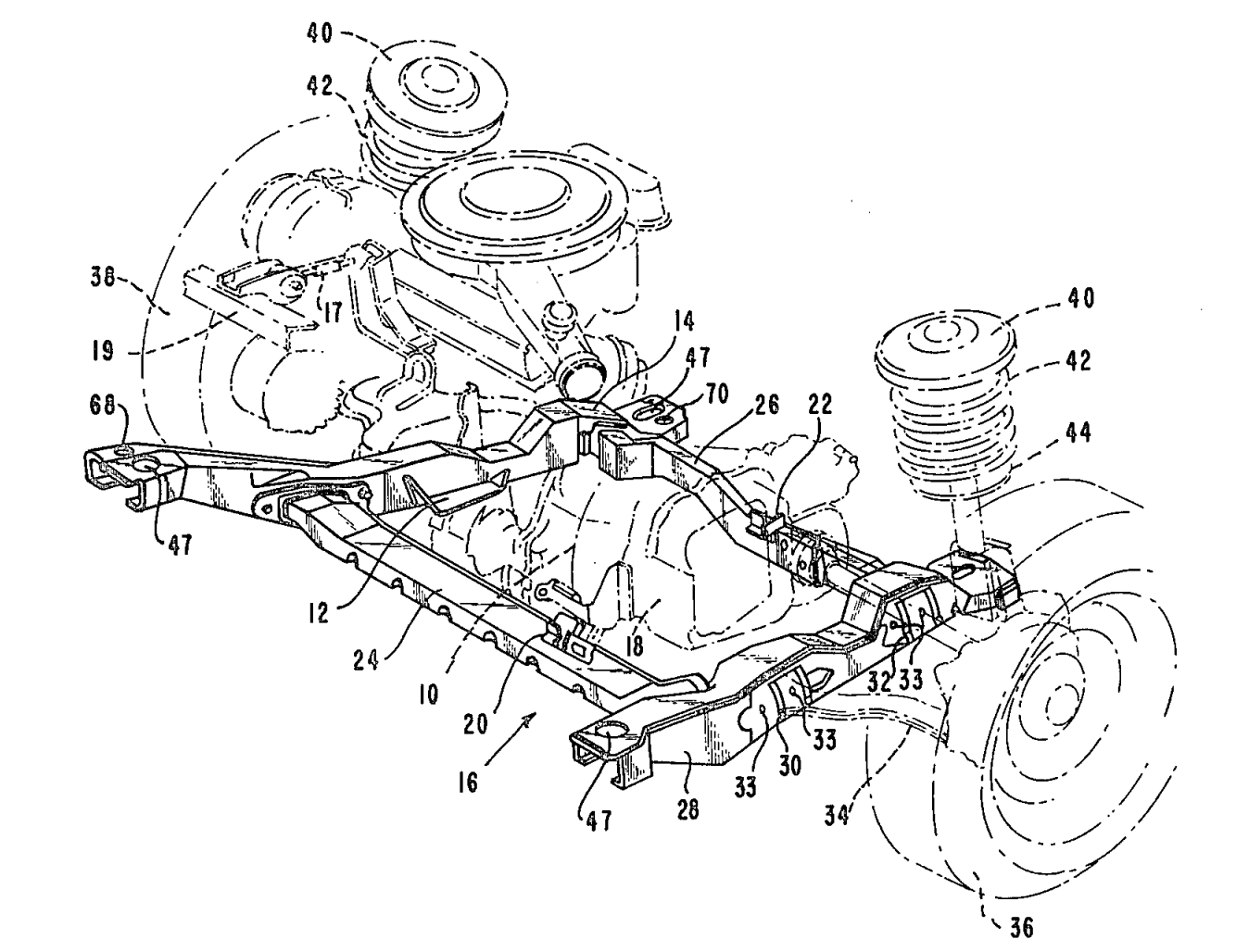

A crossmember, also known as a K-frame, is a structural component that is transverse to the main structure of a vehicle. In the automotive industry, this term typically refers to a steel component, often boxed, that is bolted across the underside of a monocoque (unibody) motor vehicle to support the engine and the transmission. For the suspension of any car to operate correctly, ensuring proper handling and maintaining body panel alignment, the frame must be strong enough to cope with the loads applied to it. It must also resist deflection and have sufficient torsional strength to withstand twisting forces.

A "K" member is a specific type of crossmember found in vehicles with longitudinally-mounted engines. It contains the engine mounts and is essential for the stability and alignment of the engine and transmission. Typically, this crossmember is designed in an "Ɪ" section to provide the necessary structural integrity.

== In early Ford vehicles ==
In early Ford vehicles, different types of crossmembers were used depending on the model and era. For example:

- The Model T featured a simple "ladder" frame design without a K-member or X-member.
- The Model A frame, while more substantial than the Model T, still used a basic ladder design and was fitted with front, center, and rear crossmembers.
- In contrast, the 1932 Ford frame was equipped with a K-member for enhanced structural support.
- Ford frames from 1933 to 1948 included a substantial X-member, offering greater rigidity and torsional strength compared to earlier designs.
