= 3,5-Dimethylpyrazole =

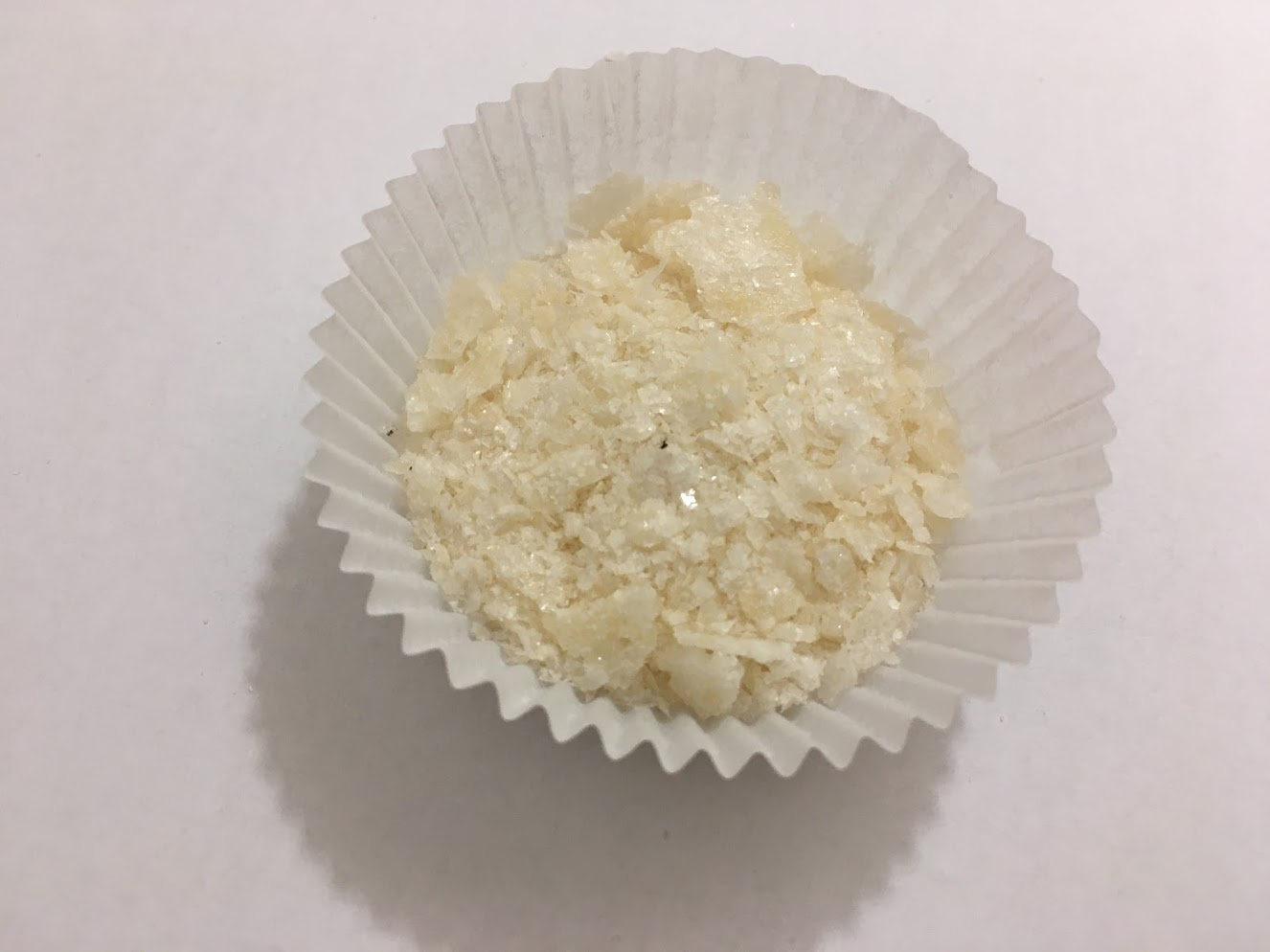

Names
- Preferred IUPAC name 3,5-Dimethyl-1H-pyrazole

Identifiers
CAS Number	67-51-6
3D model (JSmol)	Interactive image
ChEMBL	ChEMBL1828957
ChemSpider	5975
ECHA InfoCard	100.000.597
EC Number	200-657-5
PubChem CID	6210
UNII	H21N865K9J
CompTox Dashboard (EPA)	DTXSID5058777
- InChI: InChI=1S/C5H8N2/c1-4-3-5(2)7-6-4/h3H,1-2H3,(H,6,7) Key: SDXAWLJRERMRKF-UHFFFAOYSA-N
- SMILES: CC1=CC(=NN1)C

Properties
Chemical formula	C_{5}H_{8}N_{2}
Molar mass	96.133 g·mol^{−1}
Appearance	White solid
Density	1.027 g/cm^{3}
Melting point	107.5 °C (225.5 °F; 380.6 K)
Boiling point	218 °C (424 °F; 491 K)

Hazards
- GHS labelling
Pictograms	(GHS07: Exclamation mark) (GHS08: Health hazard)
Signal word	Warning
Hazard statements	H302, H315, H319, H335, H361, H373
Precautionary statements	P201, P202, P260, P264, P270, P271, P280, P281, P301+P312, P302+P352, P304+P340, P305+P351+P338, P308+P313, P312, P314, P321, P330, P332+P313, P337+P313, P362, P403+P233, P405, P501
- Except where otherwise noted, data are given for materials in their standard state (at 25 °C [77 °F], 100 kPa). Infobox references

3,5-Dimethylpyrazole is an organic compound with the formula (CH_{3}C)_{2}CHN_{2}H. It is one of several isomeric derivatives of pyrazole that contain two methyl substituents. The compound is unsymmetrical but the corresponding conjugate acid (pyrazolium) and conjugate base (pyrazolide) have C_{2v} symmetry. It is a white solid that dissolves well in polar organic solvents.

It is a precursor to a variety of ligands that are widely studied in coordination chemistry including trispyrazolylborate, a trispyrazolylmethane, and a pyrazolyldiphosphine.

Condensation of acetylacetone and hydrazine gives 3,5-dimethylpyrazole:

CH_{3}C(O)CH_{2}C(O)CH_{3} + N_{2}H_{4} → (CH_{3}C)_{2}CHN_{2}H + 2 H_{2}O

It has found use as a blocking agent for isocyanates.
