= Trisoxazolinylborate =

Class of chemical compounds

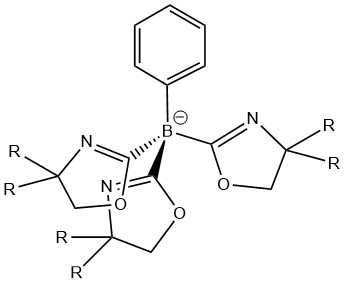
Trisoxazolinylborate ligand

Tris(oxazolinyl)borate compounds are a class of tridentate ligands; often abbreviated To^{R}, where R is the substituent on the oxazoline ring. Most commonly the substituent is either a methyl, propyl, tert-butyl or hydrogen. The formation of anionic boron backbone with addition of a phenyl group on boron allows the ligand to strongly bind to the metal center. It results in a more robust complex.

Tris(oxazolinyl)borates can be characterised as scorpionate ligands and may be compared to tris(pyrazolyl)borate and trisoxazoline ligands. In bulky pyrazolylborate (Tp) derivatives, isomerization may occur via 1,2-shifts; additionally B–N bond cleavage is a common decomposition pathways for the Tp ligands. The oxazoline-based ligands with B-C linkages avoid these decomposition problems.

== Synthesis ==
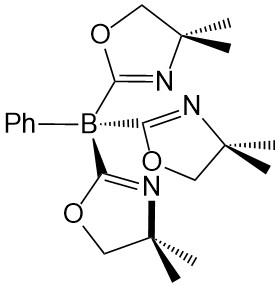
Tris(4,4-dimethyl-2-oxazolinyl)phenyl borate (To^{M})

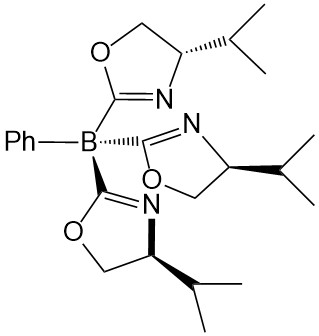
Tris(4S-isopropyl-2-oxazolinyl)phenylborate (To^{P})

The first example of a trisoxazolinylborate ligand was tris(4,4-dimethyl-2-oxazolinyl)phenyl borate (To^{M}). This was prepared by a reaction of dichlorophenylborane with 3 equivalents of 2-lithio-4,4-dimethyl-2-oxazolide. Later variants, such as tris(4S-isopropyl-2-oxazolinyl)phenylborate (To^{P}) have been prepared in an analogous manner.

PhBCl_{2} + 3 Li(Oxaz-Me_{2}) → PhB(Oxaz-Me_{2})_{3} + 3 LiCl

== Complexes of To^{R} ==
The first coordination complexes made using To^{M} ligands were based around zirconium (IV), as the sterically bulky ligands were able to stabilise the highly reactive metal centers. To^{M}Zr(IV) complexes were prepared by salt metathesis using LiTo^{M} and TlTo^{M} and ZrCl_{4}. The formed complex To^{M}ZrCl_{3} was found to be quite robust and showed C_{3}V symmetry in both solution and solid state.

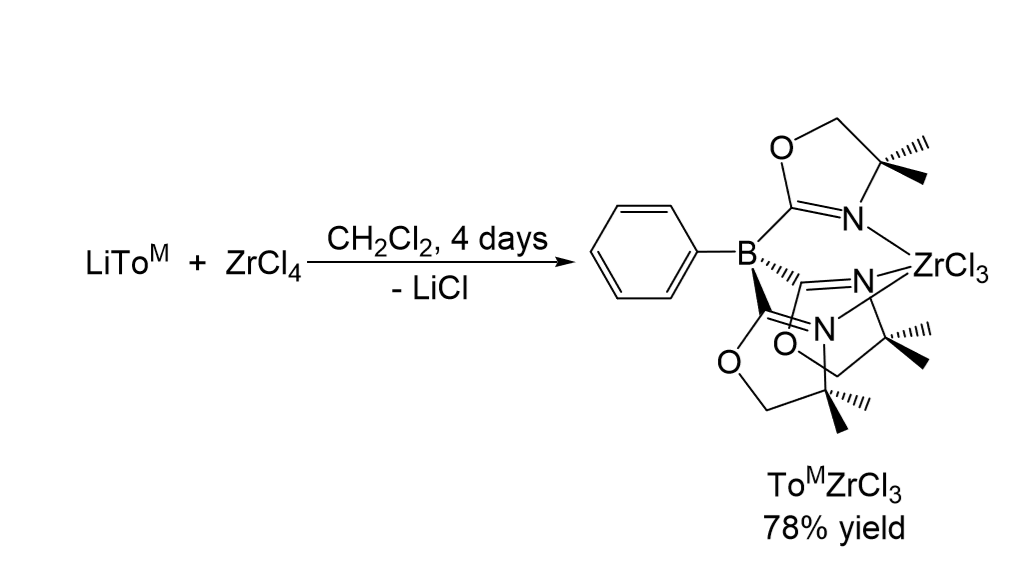
Preparation of (To^{M})ZrCl_{3} ligand

Lithium tris(4,4-dimethyl-2-oxazolin-2-yl) phenyl borate (LiTo^{M}) is used as a transfer agent. However TlTo^{M} frequently is as a more effective transfer agent than LiTo^{M} because of the higher solubility of the Tl salt and the insolubility of thallium chloride by-products. In contrast, lithium halide byproducts from preparations employing LiTo^{M} can cause purification problems.

Another example for the coordinating chemistry of To^{M} is the formation of To^{M}MgMe by the reaction of equimolar amounts of HTo^{M} and MgMe^{2}(O_{2}C_{4}H_{8})_{2}. In addition, the reaction of two equivalents of HTo^{M} with MgMe_{2}(O_{2}C_{4}H_{8})_{2} gives the homoleptic To^{M}_{2}Mg compound. This compound can also be obtained by the reaction between one equivalent of HTo^{M} and To^{M}MgMe revealing that Mg in To^{M}MgMe is an active center for the chemical reactions. According to 1H NMR spectroscopic data, To^{M}_{2}Mg shows C_{s} symmetry. In these reactions HTo^{M} is used as the transfer agent. Coordination chemistry of iridium(I) centers with To^{P} has been shown by the preparation of [Ir(To^{P})(COD)] (COD =1,5-C_{8}H_{12}) by the reaction of LiTo^{P} and 0.5 equivalent of [Ir(μ-Cl)(COD)]_{2}.

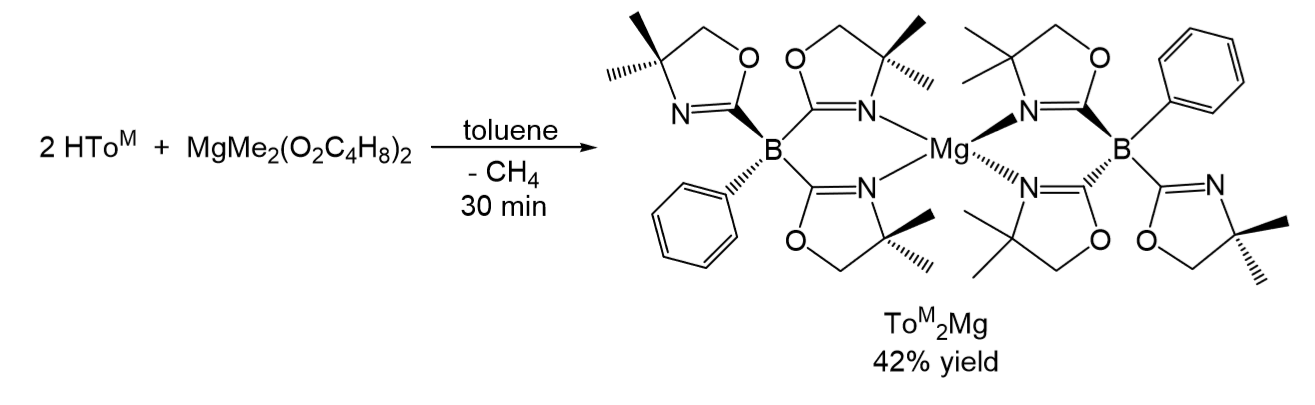
Preparation of (To^{M})_{2}Mg ligand

== Catalysis ==
To^{M}MgMe is an effective precatalyst for the cross-dehydrocoupling of Si-H bonds in organosilanes and N-H bonds in amines to give Si-N bonds and H_{2}. Furthermore, tris(oxazolinyl)borate yttrium alkyl and amide compounds (To^{M}YR_{2}) can be used as precatalysts for the cyclization of aminoalkenes.

== See also ==
- Trisoxazolines
- Trispyrazolylborate
