= Alkanolamine =

Organic compounds with hydroxyl and amino groups on an alkane backbone

In organic chemistry, alkanolamines (amino alcohols) are organic compounds that contain both hydroxyl (−OH) and amino (−NH_{2}, −NHR, and −NR_{2}) functional groups on an alkane backbone. Alkanolamines' bifunctionality and physicochemical characteristics lead to their use in many applications, such as textiles, cosmetics, agricultural chemical intermediates, drugs, and metal working fluids. Alkanolamines are present in many approved drugs and thousands of natural products. Two amino acids are alkanolamines, formally speaking: serine and hydroxyproline.

- Tropane alkaloids such as
Alkanolamines

Methanolamine, from the reaction of ammonia with formaldehyde

Ethanolamine

2-Amino-2-methyl-1-propanol is a precursor to oxazolines

Valinol is derived from the amino acid valine

Sphingosine is a component of some cell membranes.

Alkanolamines usually have high-solubility in water due to the hydrogen bonding ability of both the hydroxyl group and the amino group. Alkanoamines have also shown a broad toxicity for a variety of organisms, including parasites, insect larvae and eggs, and microbes. Studies have also shown that the antimicrobial effect of alkanolamines increases in higher pH's. Most alkanolamines are colorless.

== 1-Aminoalcohols ==
1-Aminoalcohols are better known as hemiaminals. Methanolamine is the simplest member. 1-Aminoalcohols tend to be labile, readily converting to more highly condensed derivatives or hydrolyzing to the amine and carbonyl.

== 2-Aminoalcohols ==
=== Routes ===
2-Aminoalcohols are often generated by the reaction of amines with epoxides:

C_{2}H_{4}O + R−NH_{2} → RNHC_{2}H_{4}OH

Hydrogenation or reduction of amino acids gives a large family of chiral 2-aminoalcohols:

RCH(NH_{2})CO_{2}H + 2 H_{2} → RCH(NH_{2})CH_{2}OH + H_{2}O

Examples include prolinol (from proline), valinol (from valine), tyrosinol (from tyrosine). Some 2-aminoalcohols are produced by the Sharpless asymmetric amino hydroxylation.

=== Uses and examples ===
Simple alkanolamines are used as solvents, synthetic intermediates, and high-boiling bases.

2-Aminoalcohols have been used as synthetic building blocks and chiral auxiliaries.Amino ethanols have been proven to be vital precursors for chiral morpholines and piperazines. Key members: ethanolamine, dimethylethanolamine, N-methylethanolamine, Aminomethyl propanol. Two popular drugs, often called alkanolamine beta blockers, are members of this structural class: propranolol, pindolol. 2-Aminoalcohols can also be found in the direct action subgroup of adrenergic drugs such as epinephrine, isoproterenol, phenylephrine and isoetarine.

Other medicinally useful derivative of ethanolamine: Isoetarine, veratridine, veratrine, epinephrine (adrenaline), norepinephrine (noradrenaline), atropine.

== 1,3- to 1,7-amino alcohols ==
Two examples of longer aminoalcohols include Heptaminol, a cardiac stimulant, and propanolamines.

1,3-Aminoalcohols are present in several bioactive molecules, such as Sedinone, Dumetorine, and Hygroline. 1,3-Aminoalcohols have been synthesized through a couple methods. Similar to 2-aminoalcohols, 1,3 aminoalcohols can be formed through ring openings, such as an azo-ring opening and addition. 1,3-aminoalcohols can also be synthesized through an azo-aldol condensation or an intermolecular C-H activation.

1,4 and 1,5-aminoalcohols have been synthesized through the reduction of cyclic amides. Catalyzed alkylation of primary amines with 1,4-butanediol is another synthetic route for 1,4-aminoalcohols. Larger amino alcohol (1,5 - and up) synthesis is comparatively underdeveloped. Electrochemical ring-openings can produce 1,3 to 1,7-aminoalcohols.
