= Pyrazole =

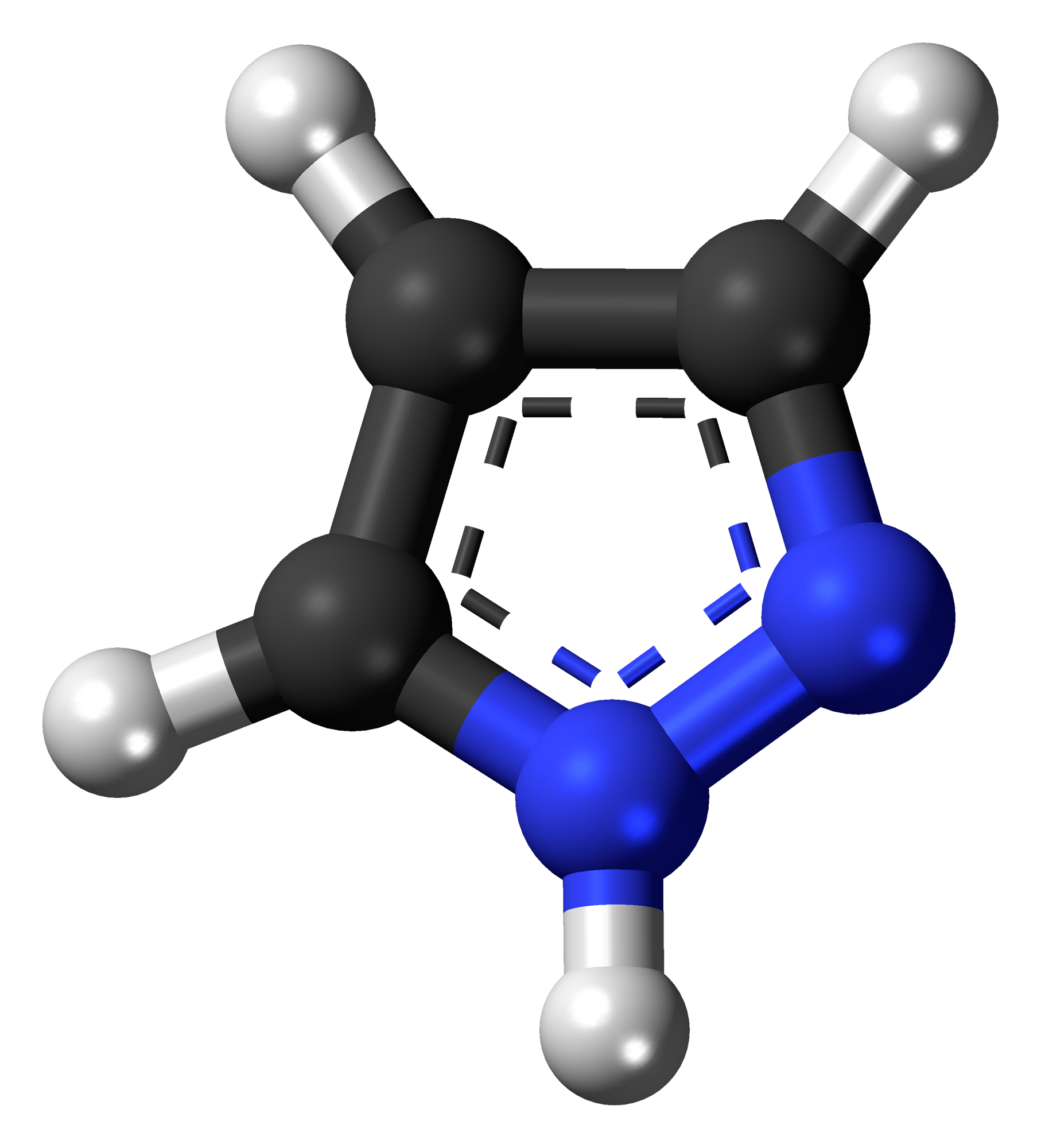

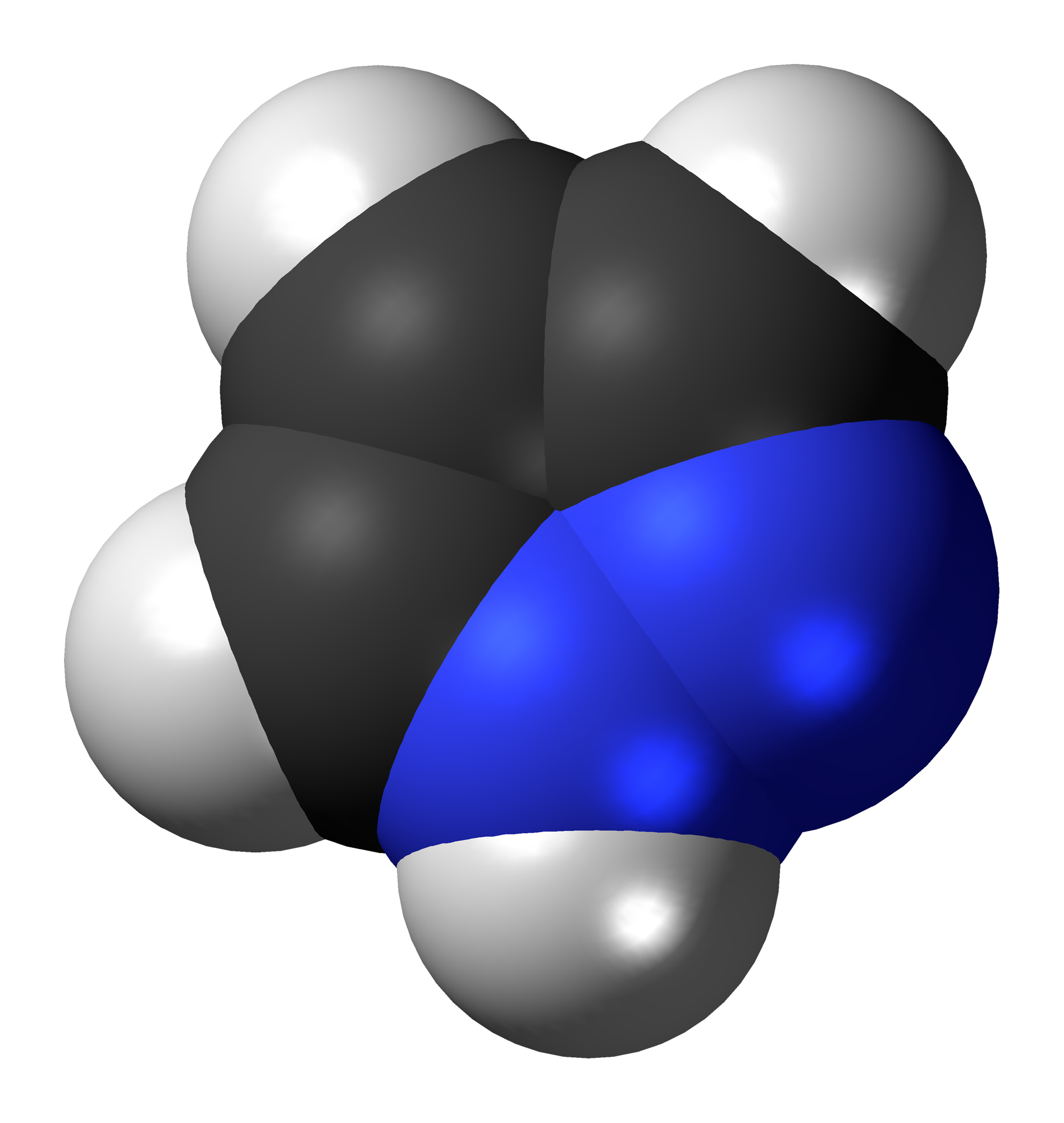

Names
- Preferred IUPAC name 1H-Pyrazole
- Systematic IUPAC name 1,2-Diazacyclopenta-2,4-diene
- Other names 1,2-Diazole

Identifiers
CAS Number	288-13-1
3D model (JSmol)	Interactive image
Beilstein Reference	103775
ChEBI	CHEBI:17241
ChEMBL	ChEMBL15967
ChemSpider	1019
DrugBank	DB02757
ECHA InfoCard	100.005.471
EC Number	206-017-1
Gmelin Reference	1360
KEGG	C00481
PubChem CID	1048
UNII	3QD5KJZ7ZJ
CompTox Dashboard (EPA)	DTXSID2059774
- InChI: InChI=1S/C3H4N2/c1-2-4-5-3-1/h1-3H,(H,4,5) Key: WTKZEGDFNFYCGP-UHFFFAOYSA-N; InChI=1/C3H4N2/c1-2-4-5-3-1/h1-3H,(H,4,5) Key: WTKZEGDFNFYCGP-UHFFFAOYAW
- SMILES: c1cn[nH]c1

Properties
Chemical formula	C_{3}H_{4}N_{2}
Molar mass	68.079 g·mol^{−1}
Melting point	66 to 70 °C (151 to 158 °F; 339 to 343 K)
Boiling point	186 to 188 °C (367 to 370 °F; 459 to 461 K)
Basicity (pK_{b})	11.5

Hazards
- GHS labelling
Pictograms	(GHS05: Corrosive) (GHS06: Toxic) (GHS07: Exclamation mark) (GHS08: Health hazard)
Signal word	Danger
Hazard statements	H302, H311, H315, H318, H319, H335, H372, H412
Precautionary statements	P260, P262, P264, P264+P265, P270, P271, P273, P280, P301+P317, P302+P352, P304+P340, P305+P351+P338, P305+P354+P338, P316, P317, P319, P321, P330, P332+P317, P337+P317, P361+P364, P362+P364, P403+P233, P405, P501
- Except where otherwise noted, data are given for materials in their standard state (at 25 °C [77 °F], 100 kPa). verify (what is ?) Infobox references

Pyrazole is an organic compound with the formula (CH)_{3}N_{2}H. It is a heterocycle characterized as an azole with a 5-membered ring of three carbon atoms and two adjacent nitrogen atoms, which are in ortho-substitution. Pyrazoles are also a class of compounds that have the ring C_{3}N_{2} with adjacent nitrogen atoms. Pyrazole itself has few applications but many substituted pyrazoles are of commercial interest. Notable drugs containing a pyrazole ring are celecoxib (celebrex) and the anabolic steroid stanozolol.

== Properties ==
Pyrazole is a weak base, with pK_{b} 11.5 (pK_{a} of the conjugate acid 2.49 at 25 °C). According to X-ray crystallography, the compound is planar. The two C-N distances are similar, both near 1.33 Å

== History ==
The term pyrazole was given to this class of compounds by German Chemist Ludwig Knorr in 1883. In a classical method developed by German chemist Hans von Pechmann in 1898, pyrazole was synthesized from acetylene and diazomethane.

== Preparation ==
Pyrazoles are synthesized by the reaction of α,β-unsaturated aldehydes with hydrazine and subsequent dehydrogenation:

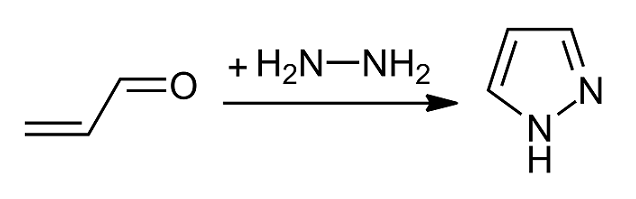

Substituted pyrazoles are prepared by condensation of 1,3-diketones with hydrazine (Knorr-type reactions). For example, acetylacetone and hydrazine gives 3,5-dimethylpyrazole:

CH_{3}C(O)CH_{2}C(O)CH_{3} + N_{2}H_{4} → (CH_{3})_{2}C_{3}HN_{2}H + 2 H_{2}O

A wide variety of pyrazoles can be made so:

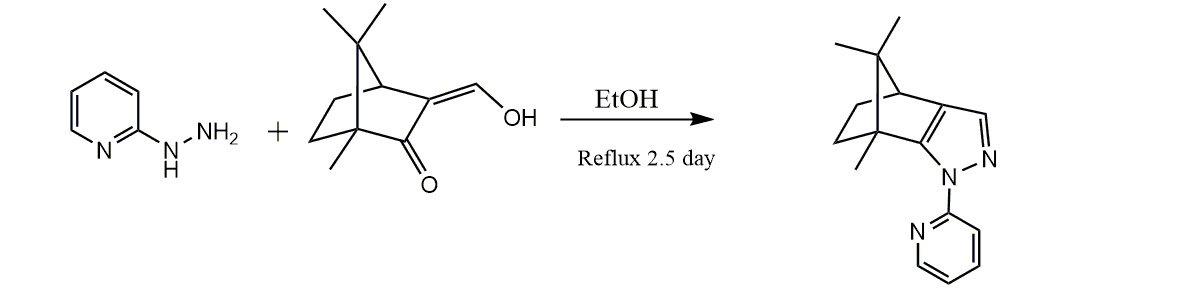
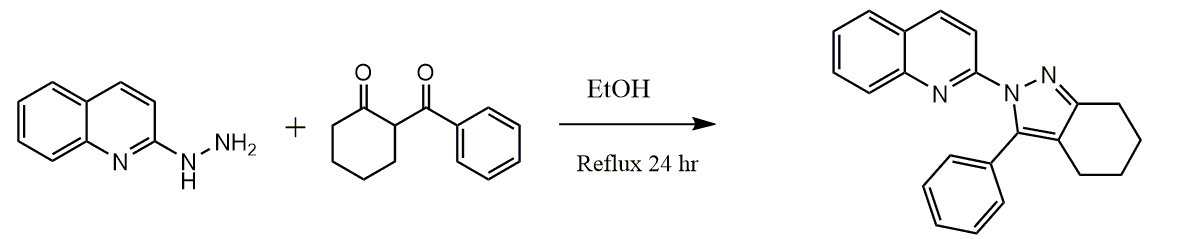
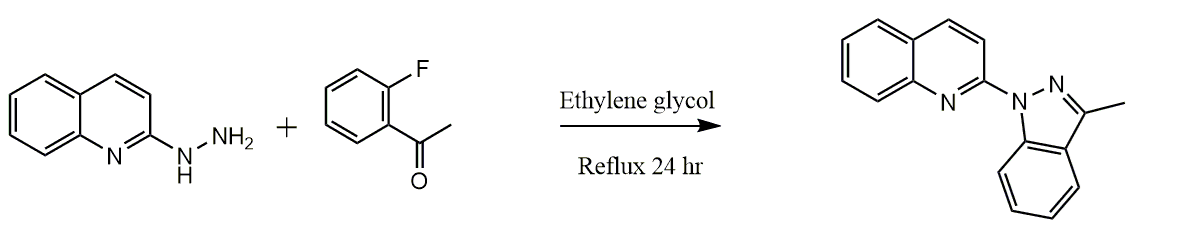

== Occurrence and uses ==
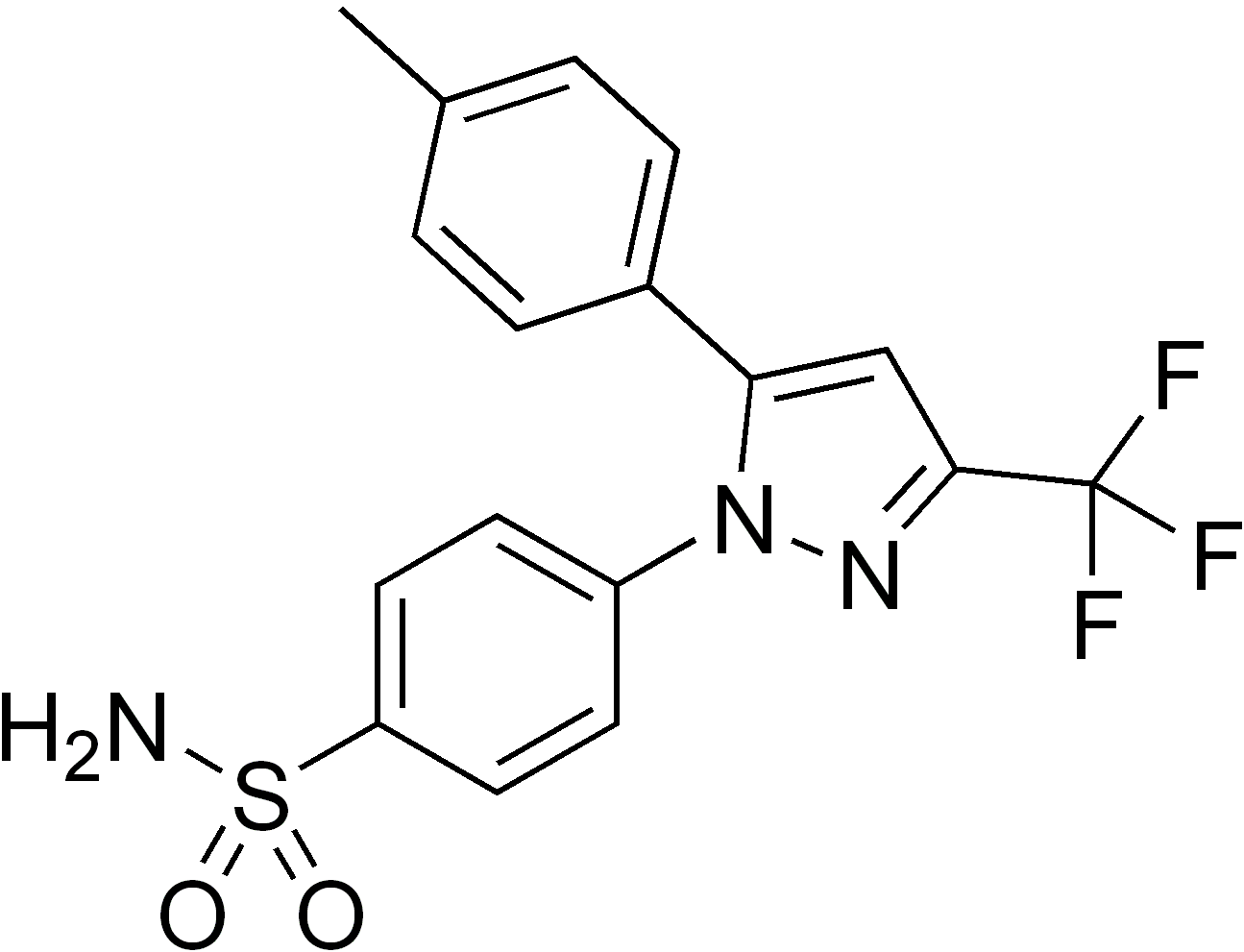
Celecoxib, a pyrazole-derived analgesic

In 1959, the first natural pyrazole, 1-pyrazolyl-alanine, was isolated from seeds of watermelons.

In medicine, derivatives of pyrazole are widely used, including celecoxib and similar COX-2 inhibitors, zaleplon, betazole, and CDPPB. The pyrazole ring is found within a variety of pesticides as fungicides, insecticides and herbicides, including fluoxapiprolin, fenpyroximate, fipronil, tebufenpyrad and tolfenpyrad. Pyrazole moieties are listed among the highly used ring systems for small molecule drugs by the US FDA

3-(Difluoromethyl)-1-methyl-1H-pyrazole-4-carboxylic acid is used in the manufacture of six commercial fungicides which are inhibitors of succinate dehydrogenase.

Pyrazole is an inhibitor of the alcohol dehydrogenase enzyme, and, as such, is used as an adjuvant with ethanol, to induce alcohol dependency in experimental laboratory mice.

=== Conversion to scorpionates ===
Pyrazoles react with potassium borohydride to form a class of ligands known as scorpionate. Pyrazole itself reacts with potassium borohydride at high temperatures (~200 °C) to form a tridentate ligand known as Tp ligand:

== See also ==
- 3,5-dimethylpyrazole
- Pyrazolidine, fully saturated analogue
- imidazole, structural analogue of pyrazole with two non-adjacent nitrogen atoms.
- isoxazole, another analogue, the nitrogen atom in position 1 replaced by oxygen.
