= (S)-iPr-PHOX =

Names
- Preferred IUPAC name (4S)-2-[2-(Diphenylphosphanyl)phenyl]-4-(propan-2-yl)-4,5-dihydro-1,3-oxazole

Identifiers
| CAS Number | 148461-14-7 |
| 3D model (JSmol) | Interactive image |
| ChemSpider | 7983538 |
| PubChem CID | 9807779 |
| UNII | 9BR74U8QLZ |
| CompTox Dashboard (EPA) | DTXSID60403391 |
- InChI: InChI=1S/C24H24NOP/c1-18(2)22-17-26-24(25-22)21-15-9-10-16-23(21)27(19-11-5-3-6-12-19)20-13-7-4-8-14-20/h3-16,18,22H,17H2,1-2H3/t22-/m1/s1 Key: OUQSAXROROGQEE-JOCHJYFZSA-N
- SMILES: CC(C)[C@H]1COC(=N1)C2=CC=CC=C2P(C3=CC=CC=C3)C4=CC=CC=C4

Properties
| Chemical formula | C_{24}H_{24}NOP |
| Molar mass | 373.436 g·mol^{−1} |
| Appearance | White solid |
| Melting point | 85 to 90 °C (185 to 194 °F; 358 to 363 K) |
- Except where otherwise noted, data are given for materials in their standard state (at 25 °C [77 °F], 100 kPa). Infobox references

(S)-iPr-PHOX, or (S)-2-[2-(diphenylphosphino)phenyl]-4-isopropyl-4,5-dihydrooxazole, is a chiral, bidentate, ligand derived from the amino alcohol valinol. It is part of a broader class of phosphinooxazolines ligands and has found application in asymmetric catalysis.

== Preparation ==
(S)-iPr-PHOX is prepared using the amino alcohol valinol, which is derived from valine. The phosphine moiety may be introduced first, by a reaction between 2-bromobenzonitrile and chlorodiphenylphosphine; the oxazoline ring is then formed in a Witte Seeliger reaction. This yields an air stable zinc complex which must be treated with bipyridine in order to obtain the free ligand. Synthesis is performed under argon or nitrogen to avoid contact with air, however the final product is not air sensitive.

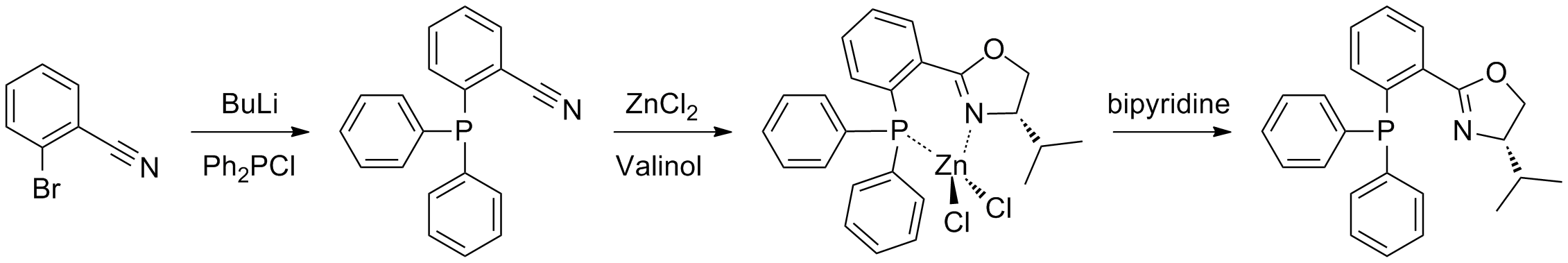

== Uses ==
Iridium complexes incorporating (S)-iPr-PHOX have been used for asymmetric hydrogenation.
