= Pyrazoline =

Pyrazolines
1-Pyrazoline
2-Pyrazoline
3-Pyrazoline

Identifiers
| CAS Number | 36118-45-3 (unspecified isomer); (1-pyrazoline): 2721-43-9; (2-pyrazoline): 109-98-8; (3-pyrazoline): 6569-23-9 |
| 3D model (JSmol) | (1-pyrazoline): Interactive image; (2-pyrazoline): Interactive image; (3-pyrazoline): Interactive image |
| ChemSpider | (1-pyrazoline): 457111; (2-pyrazoline): 60321; (3-pyrazoline): 3368027 |
| ECHA InfoCard | 100.048.057 |
| PubChem CID | (1-pyrazoline): 524190; (2-pyrazoline): 66962; (3-pyrazoline): 4156003 |
- InChI: (1-pyrazoline): InChI=1S/C3H6N2/c1-2-4-5-3-1/h1-3H2 Key: DNXIASIHZYFFRO-UHFFFAOYSA-N; (2-pyrazoline): InChI=1S/C3H6N2/c1-2-4-5-3-1/h2,5H,1,3H2 Key: MCGBIXXDQFWVDW-UHFFFAOYSA-N; (3-pyrazoline): InChI=1S/C3H6N2/c1-2-4-5-3-1/h1-2,4-5H,3H2 Key: KEQTWHPMSVAFDA-UHFFFAOYSA-N
- SMILES: (1-pyrazoline): C1CCN=N1; (2-pyrazoline): C1=NNCC1; (3-pyrazoline): C1=CCNN1

Properties
| Chemical formula | C_{3}H_{6}N_{2} |
| Molar mass | 70.095 g·mol^{−1} |
- Except where otherwise noted, data are given for materials in their standard state (at 25 °C [77 °F], 100 kPa). Infobox references

Pyrazoline is a heterocyclic chemical compound with the molecular formula C_{3}H_{6}N_{2}. Pyrazoline and its derivatives are intermediates in the synthesis of more complex chemical compounds.
