= Diphenyl-2-pyridylphosphine =

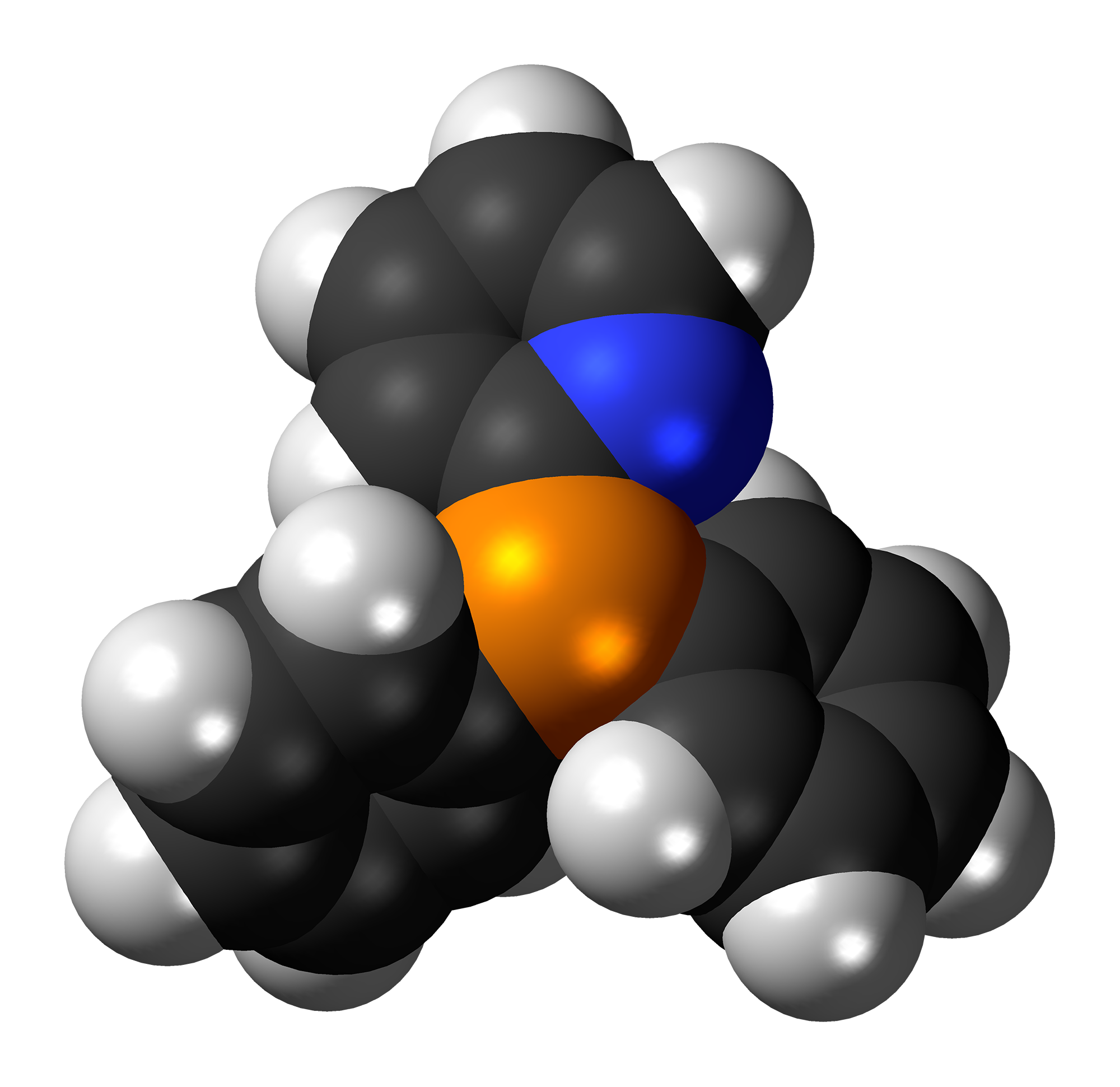

Names
- Preferred IUPAC name 2-(Diphenylphosphanyl)pyridine
- Other names 2-(Diphenylphosphino)pyridine; Diphenyl-2-pyridylphosphine

Identifiers
CAS Number	37943-90-1
3D model (JSmol)	Interactive image
ChemSpider	540361
ECHA InfoCard	100.157.265
PubChem CID	621893
UNII	4K685YSU7Y
CompTox Dashboard (EPA)	DTXSID00347462
- InChI: InChI=1S/C17H14NP/c1-3-9-15(10-4-1)19(16-11-5-2-6-12-16)17-13-7-8-14-18-17/h1-14H Key: SVABQOITNJTVNJ-UHFFFAOYSA-N; InChI=1/C17H14NP/c1-3-9-15(10-4-1)19(16-11-5-2-6-12-16)17-13-7-8-14-18-17/h1-14H Key: SVABQOITNJTVNJ-UHFFFAOYAU
- SMILES: C1=CC=C(C=C1)P(C2=CC=CC=C2)C3=CC=CC=N3

Properties
Chemical formula	C_{17}H_{14}NP
Molar mass	263.280 g·mol^{−1}
Appearance	White crystalline solid
Melting point	85 °C (185 °F; 358 K)
Boiling point	163 °C (325 °F; 436 K)

Hazards
- Occupational safety and health (OHS/OSH)
Main hazards	GHS07 Acute toxicity (oral, dermal, inhalation), category 4 Skin irritation, category 2 Eye irritation, category 2 Skin sensitization, category 1 Specific Target Organ Toxicity – Single exposure, category 3
- Except where otherwise noted, data are given for materials in their standard state (at 25 °C [77 °F], 100 kPa). verify (what is ?) Infobox references

Diphenyl-2-pyridylphosphine is an organophosphorus compound with the formula P(C_{6}H_{5})_{2}(2-C_{5}H_{4}N). It is the most widely used mono-pyridylphosphine ligand. Other mono-pyridylphosphines ligands (3-, 4-) are not common in chemical literature; however, tris-pyridylphosphines have been thoroughly investigated as ligands in transition metal complexes used for catalysis. Pyridylphosphines, including diphenyl-2-pyridylphosphine, may bind transition metals as monodentate or bidentate ligands4. Diphenyl-2-pyridylphosphine behaves as a P-bound monodentate ligand, or a P,N-bound bidentate ligand. Diphenyl-2-pyridylphosphine is a sought after ligand for its ability to relay protons to transition metals such as palladium(II) in homogeneous catalysis.

== Synthesis ==
Diphenyl-2-pyridylphosphine is prepared from 2-lithiopyridine with chlorodiphenylphosphine:

Diphenyl-2-pyridylphosphine is an integral ligand in the Pd(II) catalyzed carbonylation of alkynes. The pi-donor ability of one bidentate P,N-coordinated ligand is highly stabilizing to the metal center. While a second monodentate, N-protonated ligand transfers protons to the metal to be used in catalysis. The role of the pyridyl group in this catalytic cycle is evident when the ligand is replaced by triphenyl phosphine, and rates of catalysis a greatly decreased. This catalytic process is an important step in the production of polymers, and other fine chemicals.

RC_{2}H + CO + XH + Pd cat → RCCH_{2}COX + RCHCHCOX Pd cat = Pd(OAc)_{2}/Ph_{2}PPy/ CH_{3}SO_{3}H R=alkyl, aryl X=OH, OR’, NR_{2}’ Scheme 1: Carbonylation of alkynes by cationic Pd(II) catalyst with a diphenyl-2-pyridylphosphine ligand.
