= Oxazoline =

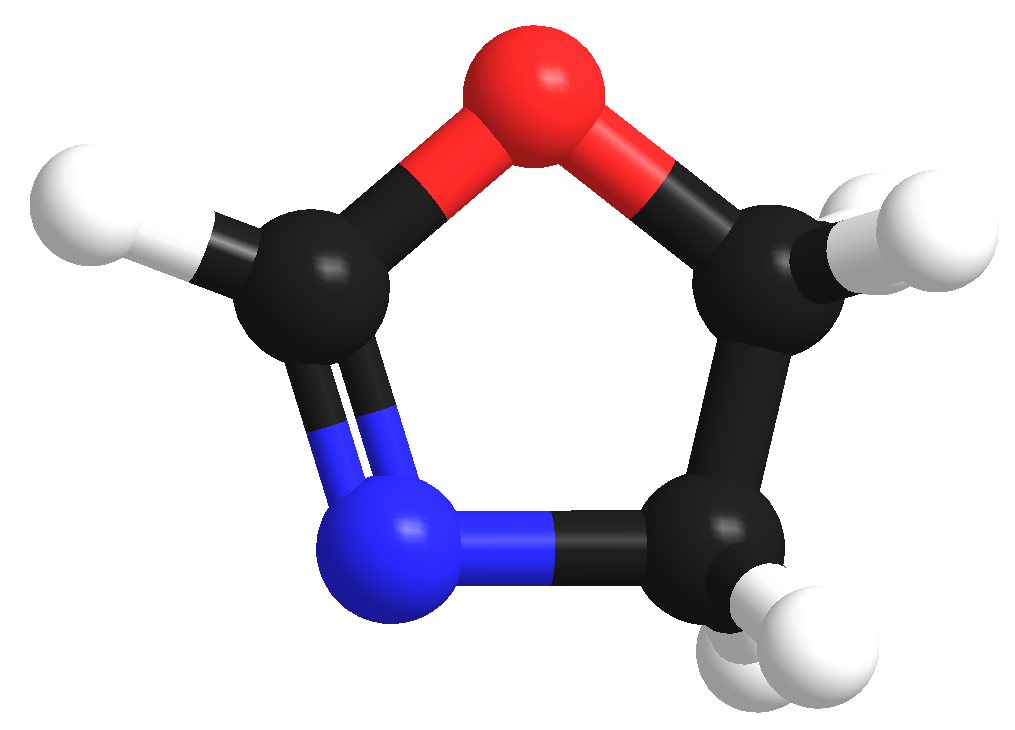

Names
- Preferred IUPAC name 4,5-Dihydro-1,3-oxazole
- Other names Δ2-oxazoline

Identifiers
CAS Number	504-77-8 (2-oxazoline); 95879-85-9 (3-oxazoline); 6569-13-7 (4-oxazoline)
3D model (JSmol)	Interactive image
ChEBI	generic: CHEBI:38327
ChemSpider	61465
ECHA InfoCard	100.007.274
EC Number	208-000-4
PubChem CID	68157
UNII	31TB4J57Y5 (2-oxazoline)
CompTox Dashboard (EPA)	DTXSID9052139
- InChI: InChI=1S/C3H5NO/c1-2-5-3-4-1/h3H,1-2H2 Key: IMSODMZESSGVBE-UHFFFAOYSA-N
- SMILES: N\1=C\OCC/1

Properties
Chemical formula	C_{3}H_{5}NO
Molar mass	71.079 g·mol^{−1}
Density	1.075^{unit?}
Boiling point	98 °C (208 °F; 371 K)
- Except where otherwise noted, data are given for materials in their standard state (at 25 °C [77 °F], 100 kPa). verify (what is ?) Infobox references

Oxazoline is a five-membered heterocyclic organic compound with the formula C_{3}H_{5}NO. It is the parent of a family of compounds called oxazolines (emphasis on plural), which contain non-hydrogenic substituents on carbon and/or nitrogen. Oxazolines are the unsaturated analogues of oxazolidines, and they are isomeric with isoxazolines, where the N and O are directly bonded. Two isomers of oxazoline are known, depending on the location of the double bond.

Oxazoline itself has no applications however oxazolines have been widely investigated for potential applications. These applications include use as ligands in asymmetric catalysis, as protecting groups for carboxylic acids and increasingly as monomers for the production of polymers.

== Isomers ==
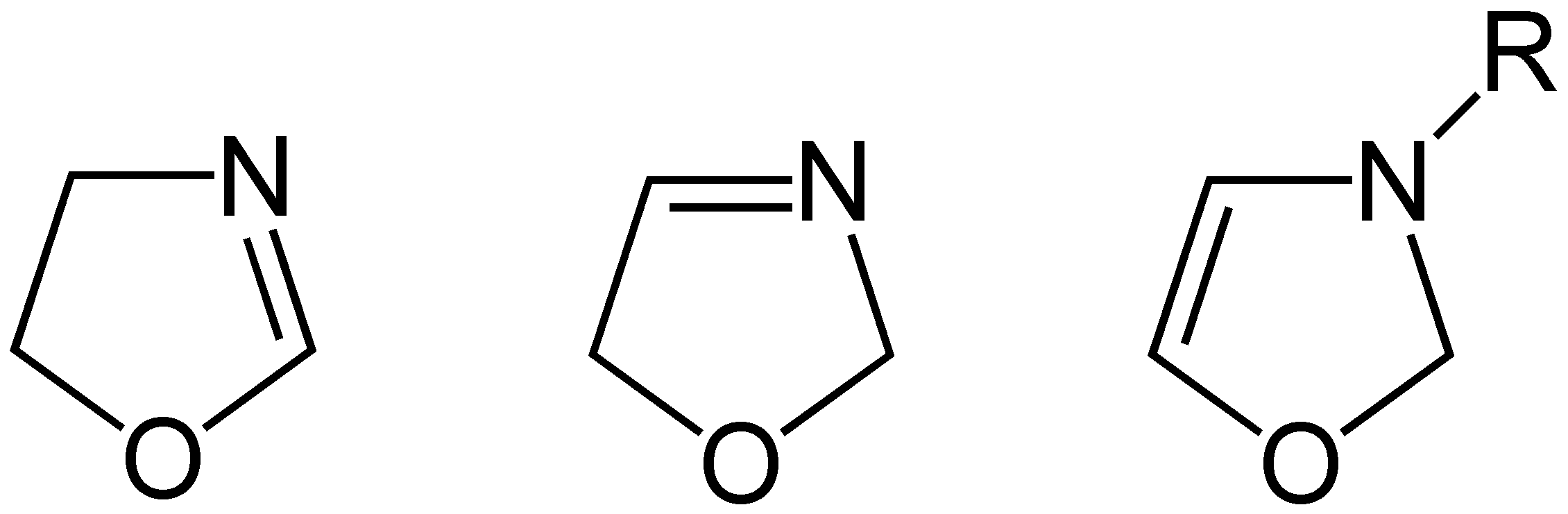
2‑oxazoline, 3‑oxazoline, and 4‑oxazoline (from left to right)

Three structural isomers of oxazoline are possible depending on the location of the double bond, however only 2‑oxazolines are common. 4‑Oxazolines are formed as intermediates during the production of certain azomethine ylides but are otherwise rare. 3‑Oxazolines are even less common but have been synthesised photochemically and by the ring opening of azirines. These three forms do not readily interconvert and hence are not tautomers.

Three other isomers exist in which the O and N atoms are adjacent, these are known as isoxazolines: 2‑isoxazoline, 3‑isoxazoline and 4‑isoxazoline.

== Synthesis ==
The synthesis of 2-oxazoline rings is well established and in general proceeds via the cyclisation of a 2-amino alcohol (typically obtained by the reduction of an amino acid) with a suitable functional group. The overall mechanism is usually subject to Baldwin's rules.

=== From carboxylic acids ===
The usual route to oxazolines entails reaction of acyl chlorides with 2-amino alcohols. Thionyl chloride is commonly used to generate the acid chloride in situ, care being taken to maintain anhydrous conditions, as oxazolines can be ring-opened by chloride if the imine becomes protonated. The reaction is typically performed at room temperature. If reagents milder than SOCl_{2} are required, oxalyl chloride can be used. Aminomethyl propanol is a popular precursor amino alcohol.

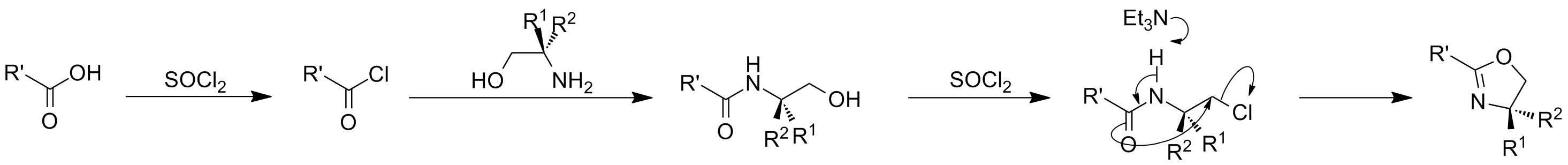

Modification of the Appel reaction allows for the synthesis of oxazoline rings. This method proceeds under relatively mild conditions, however, owing to the large amounts of triphenylphosphine oxide produced, is not ideal for large-scale reactions. The use of this method is becoming less common, due to carbon tetrachloride being restricted under the Montreal Protocol.

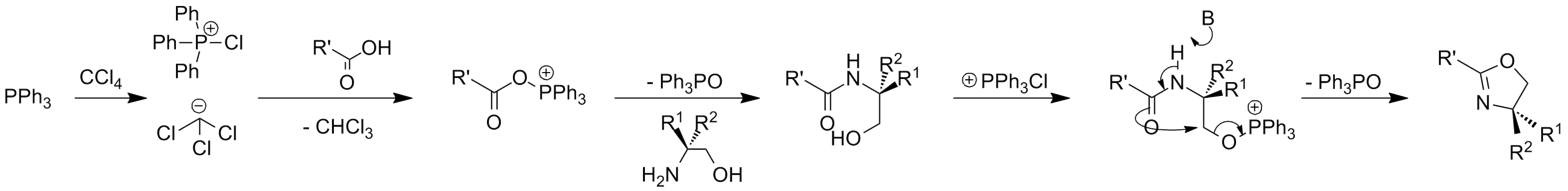

=== From aldehydes ===
The cyclisation of an amino alcohol and an aldehyde produces an intermediate oxazolidine which can be converted to an oxazoline by treatment with a halogen-based oxidising agent (e.g. NBS, or iodine); this potentially proceeds via an imidoyl halide. The method has been shown to be effective for a wide range of aromatic and aliphatic aldehydes however electron rich aromatic R groups, such as phenols, are unsuitable as they preferentially undergo rapid electrophilic aromatic halogenation with the oxidising agent.

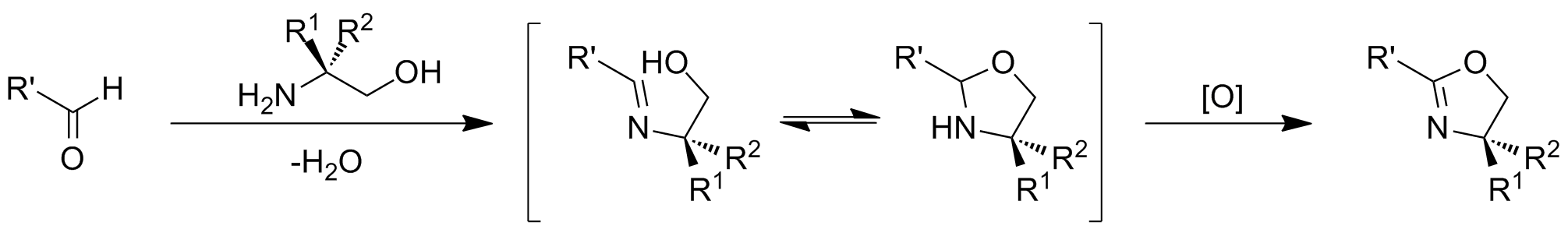

=== From nitriles ===
The use of catalytic amounts of ZnCl_{2} to generate oxazolines from nitriles was first described by Witte and Seeliger, and further developed by Bolm et al. The reaction requires high temperatures to succeed and is typically performed in refluxing chlorobenzene under anhydrous conditions. A precise reaction mechanism has never been proposed, although it is likely similar to the Pinner reaction; preceding via an intermediate amidine. Limited research has been done into identifying alternative solvents or catalysts for the reaction.

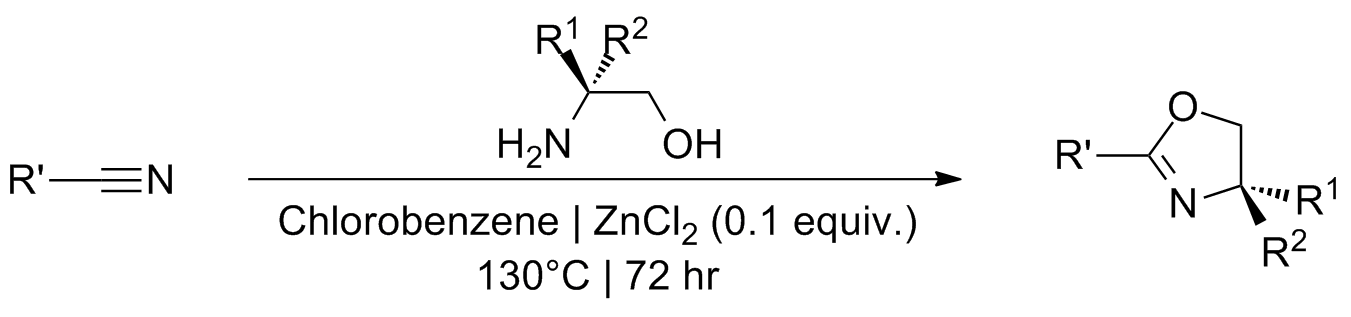

== Applications ==
=== Ligands ===
Ligands containing a chiral 2-oxazoline ring are used in asymmetric catalysis due to their facile synthesis, wide range of forms and effectiveness for many types of catalytic transformation.

2-Substituted oxazolines possess a moderately hard N-donor. Chirality is easily incorporated by using 2-amino alcohols prepared by the reduction of amino acids; which are both optically pure and inexpensive. As the stereocentre in such oxazolines is adjacent to the coordinating N-atom, it can influence the selectivity of processes occurring at the metal centre. The ring is thermally stable and resistant to nucleophiles, bases, radicals, and weak acids as well as being fairly resistant to hydrolysis and oxidation; thus it can be expected to remain stable in a wide range of reaction conditions.

Major classes of oxazoline based ligand include:

- Bis-oxazolines (BOX)
- Phosphinooxazolines (PHOX) for example (S)-iPr-PHOX

Notable specialist oxazoline ligands include:

- Tris-oxazolines (TRISOX)
- Bis(oxazolinato)s
- Trisoxazolinylborate ligands

=== Polymers ===
Some 2-oxazolines, such as 2-ethyl-2-oxazoline, undergo living cationic ring-opening polymerisation to form poly(2-oxazoline)s. These are polyamides and can be regarded as analogues of peptides; they have numerous potential applications and have received particular attention for their biomedical uses.

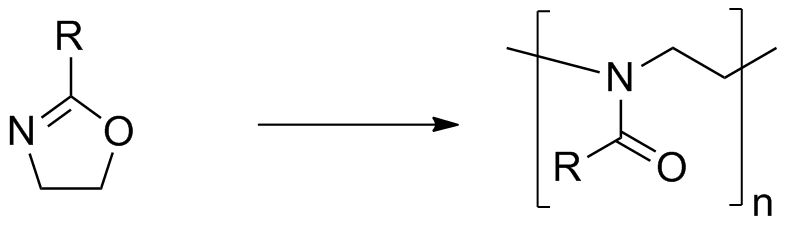

=== Analysis of fatty acids ===
The dimethyloxazoline (DMOX) derivatives of fatty acids are amenable to analysis by gas chromatography.

=== Protecting groups ===
Oxazolines are a rare protecting group for esters.

== See also ==
Structural analogues

- Benzoxazole: where the oxazoline is fused onto a benzene ring.
- Oxazole: which has two double bonds
- Oxazolidine: which has no double bonds
- Thiazoline: where the oxygen is replaced by sulphur

Other pages

- Aminorex a drug bearing an oxazoline ring
