= Trispyrazolylborate =

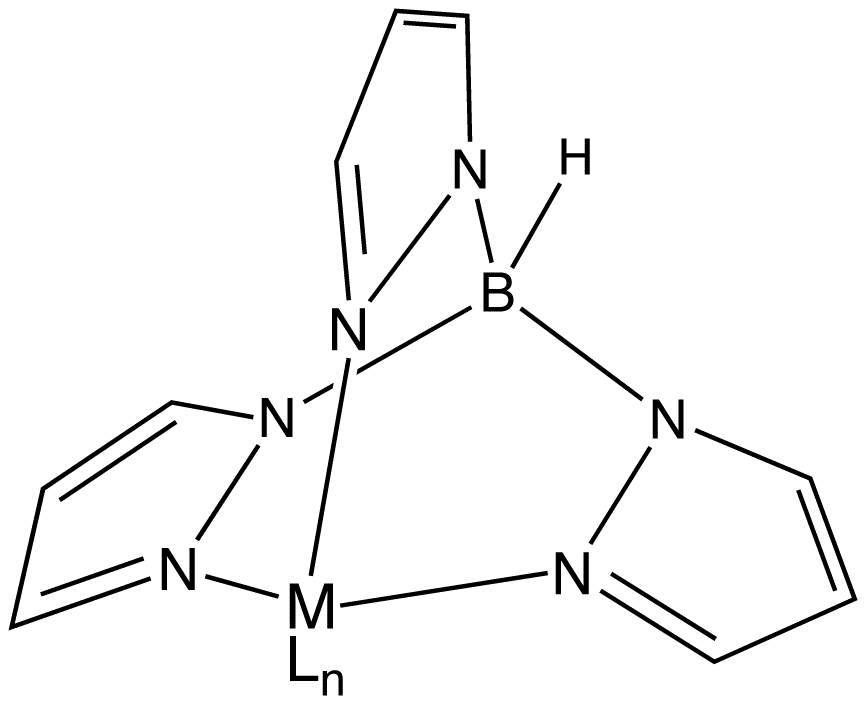
Idealized structure of a Tp ligand bound to a metal center ML_{n}

The trispyrazolylborate ligand, abbreviated Tp^{−}, is an anionic tridentate and tripodal ligand. Trispyrazolylborate refers specifically to the anion [HB(C_{3}N_{2}H_{3})_{3}]^{−}. However, the term can also be used to refer to derivatives having substituents on the pyrazolyl rings. This class of compounds belongs to the family of ligands called scorpionate ligands.

== Tp ligands ==
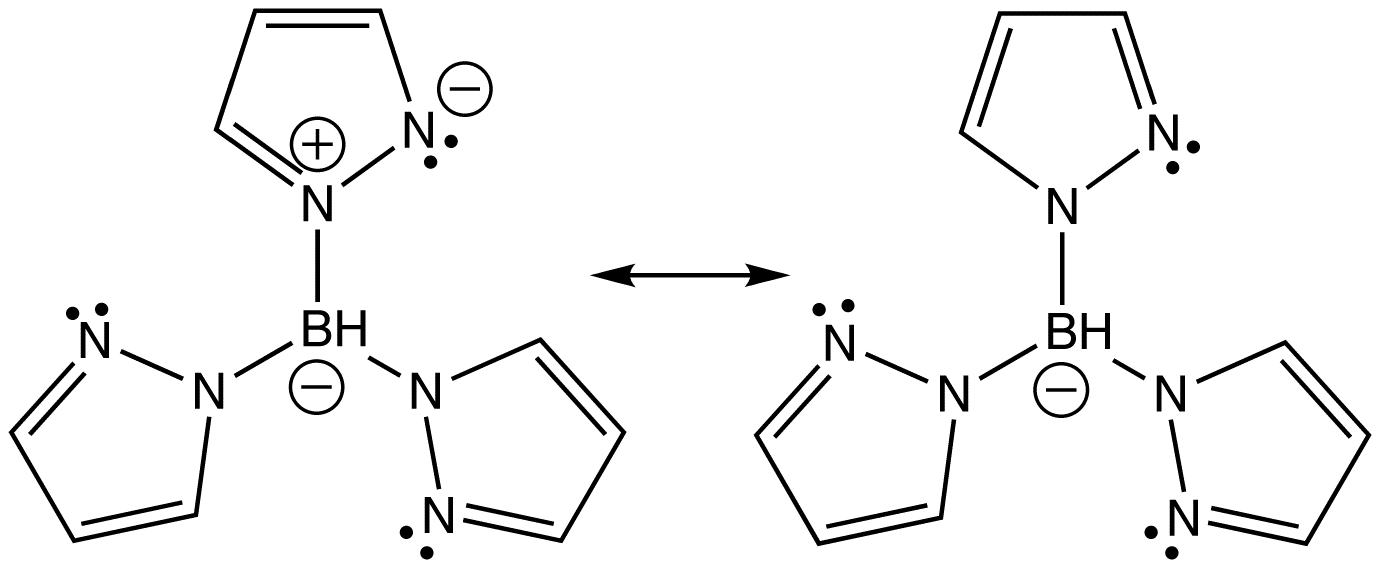
Two of several resonance structures of trispyrazolylborate

As suggested by the resonance structures, the nitrogen centers that are not bonded to boron are basic. These centers bind to three adjacent sites of a metal such that the simple adducts have C_{3v} symmetry. The facial bonding mode is reminiscent of cyclopentadienyl ligands, although the ligand field stabilization energy of Tp^{−} is weaker as indicated by the fact that FeTp_{2} is a spin-crossover complex whereas ferrocene is low-spin.

The Tp ligands are usually prepared from the reaction of pyrazole with potassium borohydride:

KBH_{4} + 3 C_{3}H_{3}N_{2}H → K[HB(C_{3}N_{2}H_{3})_{3}] + 3H_{2}

Intermediates include the monopyrazolylborate ([H_{3}B(C_{3}N_{2}H_{3})]^{−}) and the bispyrazolylborate ([H_{2}B(C_{3}N_{2}H_{3})_{2}]^{−}). KTp is a colourless solid that is soluble in polar solvents with a melting point of 188–189 °C.

=== Substituted tris(pyrazolyl)borates ===
Condensation of 3-substituted pyrazoles with borohydride affords the corresponding substituted Tp derivatives. The substituent forces boron to the less hindered nitrogen center. Thus 3-phenylpyrazole gives HB(C_{3}N_{2}H_{2}Ph)_{3}]^{−}, abbreviated [Tp^{Ph}]^{−}, wherein the phenyl substituents project away from the metal. Analogously 3-isopropylpyrazole gives HB(C_{3}N_{2}H_{2}^{i}Pr)_{3}]^{−}, abbreviated [Tp^{iPr}]^{−}. 3,5-Dimethylpyrazole gives the hexamethylated ligand [HB(C_{3}N_{2}HMe_{2})_{3}]^{−}, sometimes called Tp*^{−}. Because pyrazoles are readily prepared from 1,3-diketones, a large number of substituted Tp complexes are possible. Derivatives are known with perfluorinated, chiral, and functional substituents.

== Examples ==
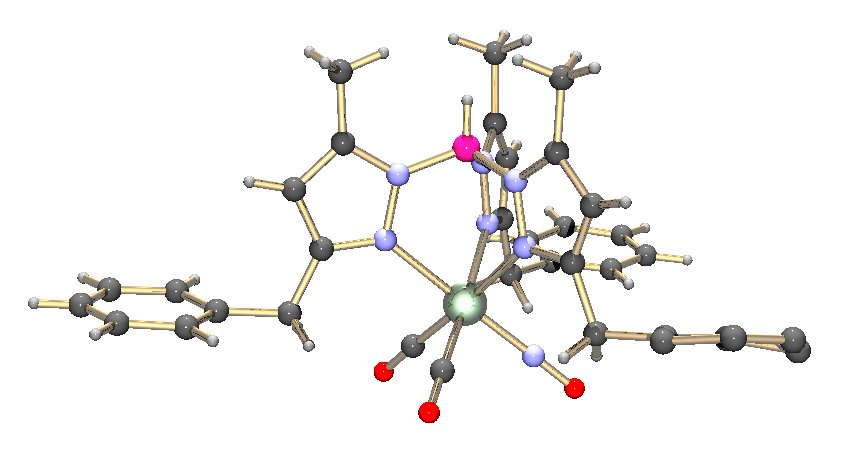
Structure of the piano stool complex Tp^{Bn,Me}Mo(CO)_{2}NO.

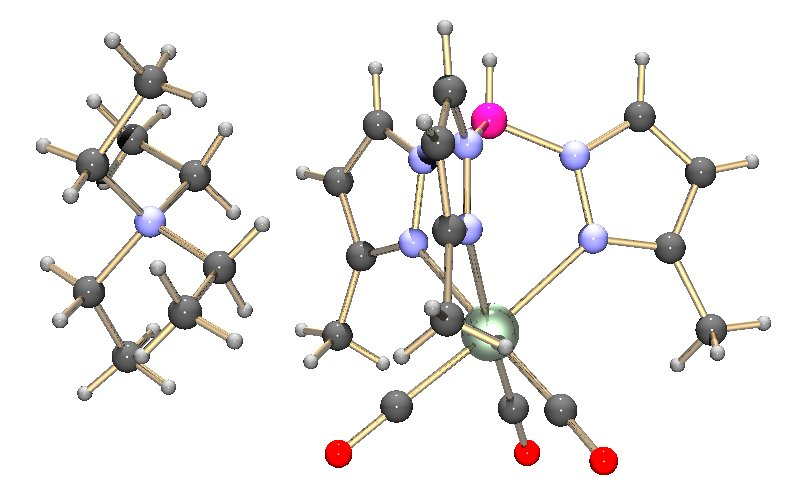
Structure of the anionic piano stool complex [Tp^{Me}Mo(CO)_{3}]^{−} together with the counterion [NEt_{4}]^{+}.

Illustrative of the synthetic routes to Tp^{R}^{−} complexes, MnBr(CO)_{5} and KTp react as follows:

MnBr(CO)_{5} + KTp → TpMn(CO)_{3} + KBr + 2 CO

Electronically related compounds are known, such as CpMn(CO)_{3} and [(9-ane-S3)Mn(CO)_{3}]^{+}. The labile acetonitrile complex Mo(CO)_{3}(MeCN)_{3} reacts with KTp to give the anion [MoTp(CO)_{3}]^{−}, which can be crystallised as its tetraethylammonium salt (see figure):

Mo(CO)_{3}(CH_{3}CN)_{3} + KTp → K[TpMo(CO)_{3}] + 3 CH_{3}CN

Protonation, allylation, and nitrosylation of this salt gives the corresponding neutral hydride, allyl, and nitrosyl (see figure) derivatives.

The inductive effect of substituents on the pyrazolyl groups is illustrated by the values of ν_{CO} for Tp^{CF_{3}}CuCO (2201 cm^{−1}) versus Tp^{Me}CuCO (2137 cm^{−1}).

Although of no practical value, trispyrazolylborate compounds have been applied to a variety of themes. In bioinorganic chemistry, some of the first crystallizable copper dioxygen complexes were obtained using this ligand platform, including examples of the Cu_{2}(μ-η^{2},η^{2}-O_{2}) bonding mode. Models for hemerythrin, an enzyme with a diiron active site, and xanthine oxidase, a molybdoenzyme, have been examined. In such model complexes, the Tp^{−} simulates the coordination environment provided by three imidazole ligands in proteins.

In organometallic chemistry, Tp*Rh(CO)_{2} and related complexes participate in C–H activation reactions.

Derivatives of Grignard reagents can be generated, such as Tp^{^{i}Bu}MgCH_{3}.

== See also ==
- Trisoxazolinylborate
