= Potassium borohydride =

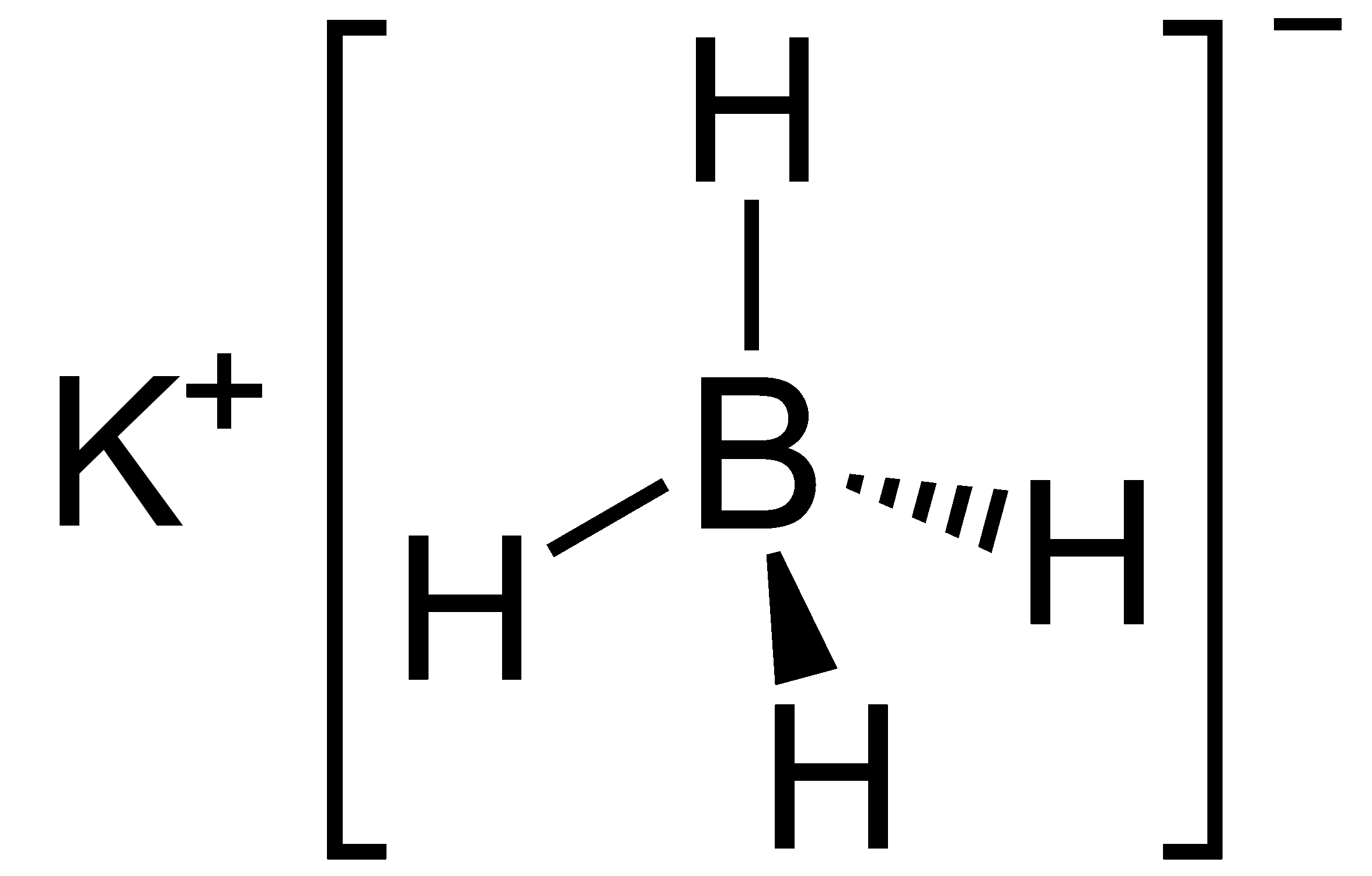

Names
- IUPAC name Potassium tetrahydroborate
- Other names Potassium tetrahydridoborate Borate(1-), tetrahydro-, potassium (1:1)

Identifiers
CAS Number	13762-51-1
3D model (JSmol)	Interactive image
ChemSpider	55580
ECHA InfoCard	100.033.949
EC Number	237-360-5
PubChem CID	4192641
UNII	0WS230DTGF
UN number	1870 (POTASSIUM BOROHYDRIDE)
CompTox Dashboard (EPA)	DTXSID50929853
- InChI: InChI=1S/BH4.K/h1H4;/q-1;+1 Key: ICRGAIPBTSPUEX-UHFFFAOYSA-N
- SMILES: [BH4-].[K+]

Properties
Chemical formula	K[BH_{4}]
Molar mass	53.94 g·mol^{−1}
Appearance	colorless solid
Density	1.17 g/mL
Melting point	607 °C (1,125 °F; 880 K) decomposes
Solubility in water	19g/100g
Solubility in methanol	3.9g/100g

Hazards
- GHS labelling
Pictograms	(GHS02: Flammable) (GHS05: Corrosive) (GHS06: Toxic)
Signal word	Danger
Hazard statements	H261, H301, H311, H314, H331
Precautionary statements	P280, P305+P351+P338, P309, P310, P370+P378, P402+P404

Related compounds
Other anions	Potassium hydride
Other cations	Lithium borohydride; Sodium borohydride
- Except where otherwise noted, data are given for materials in their standard state (at 25 °C [77 °F], 100 kPa). Infobox references

Potassium borohydride, also known as potassium tetrahydroborate, is an inorganic compound with the formula KBH_{4}.

== Preparation ==
It can be obtained through the reaction of sodium borohydride with aqueous potassium hydroxide in a methanol or water solvent:

NaBH_{4} + KOH → KBH_{4} + NaOH

== Properties ==
Potassium is a colorless solid that is stable at room temperature and in an aqueous alkaline solution. Potassium borohydride has a hydrogen desorption temperature of 584 °C, higher than for lithium borohydride or sodium borohydride.

Like the related Na^{+}, Rb^{+}, and Cs^{+} salts, potassium borohydride crystallizes in a sodium chloride lattice type, space group Fm3m.

== As a reagent ==
Often potassium borohydride behaves similarly to the more common sodium borohydride, but solubility considerations sometimes recommend the potassium salt. One example is the synthesis of potassium trispyrazolylborate (KTp). The procedure involves heating potassium borohydride and pyrazole without a solvent.

KBH_{4} + 3 C_{3}N_{2}H_{4} → KHB(C_{3}N_{2}H_{3})_{3} + 3 H_{2}

Diborane is produced by treating potassium borohydride with phosphoric acid.

In combination with bismuth trichloride, it forms a reagent for the reduction of nitro group to the hydroxylamine.
