= Scorpionate ligand =

Tridentate ligand which "pinches" the central metal atom

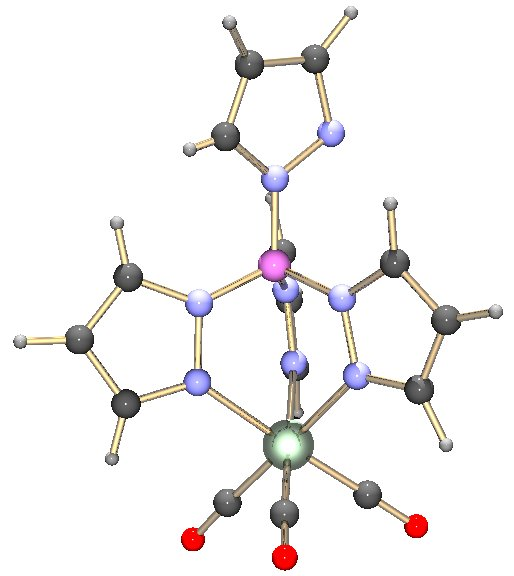
An example of a manganese complex of a homoscorpionate, the organic ligand has four pyrazole groups attached to a boron. The other three ligands attached to the metal are carbonyl (carbon monoxide) ligands

In coordination chemistry, a scorpionate ligand is a tridentate (three-donor-site) ligand that binds to a central atom in a fac manner. The most popular class of scorpionates are the hydrotris(pyrazolyl)borates or Tp ligands. These were also the first to become popular. These ligands first appeared in journals in 1966 from the then little-known DuPont chemist of Ukrainian descent, Swiatoslaw Trofimenko. Trofimenko called this discovery "a new and fertile field of remarkable scope".

The term scorpionate comes from the fact that the ligand can bind a metal with two donor sites like the pincers of a scorpion; the third and final donor site reaches over the plane formed by the metal and the other two donor atoms to bind to the metal. The binding can be thought of as being like a scorpion grabbing the metal with two pincers before stinging it.

While many scorpionate ligands are of the Tp class, many other scorpionate ligands are known. For example, the Tm and tripodal phosphine classes have an equally good claim to be scorpionate ligands. Many of the scorpionate ligands have a central boron atom which bears a total of four groups, but it is possible to create ligands which use other central atoms.

== Homoscorpionates vs. heteroscorpionates ==
Trofimenko's initial work in the field was with the homoscorpionates where three pyrazolyl groups are attached to a boron. Since this work a range of ligands have been reported where more than one type of metal binding group is attached to the central atom; these are the heteroscorpionates.

Many other chemists continue to explore the possibilities of scorpionate ligand alternatives, such as:

- utilizing pyrrole, imidazole, or indole compounds in place of the pyrazole rings²;
- the possibility of tripodal heptadentate ligands such as N_{4}O_{3} from the ligand tris[6-((2-N,N-diethylcarbamoyl)pyridyl)methyl]amine³;
- Sulfur donor groups such as those found in the Tm ligand or oxygen donor groups.
- changing the ligands to alter the type of molecular encapsulation needed to metals;
- for very different applications, "heteroscorpionate ligands" have been examined of hybrid scorpionate/cyclopentadienyl-lithium compounds such as [Li(2,2-bis(3,5-dimethylpyrazol-1-yl)1,1-diphenylethylcyclopentadienyl(THF)] which catalyzes olefin polymerization.

== Isolobality ==
Since the work by Wilkinson and others on ferrocene, a vast amount of work has been done on cyclopentadienyl complexes. It was soon understood by many organometallic chemists that a Cp ligand is isolobal to Tp. As many insights into chemistry can be obtained by the study of a series of closely related compounds (where only one feature is changed) a great deal of organometallic chemistry has been done using Tp (and more recently Tm) as a co-ligand on the metal.

The Tp, Tm, trithia-9-crown-3 (a sulfur version of a small crown ether) and cyclopentadienyl (Cp) ligands related ligands and form related complexes. These ligands donate the same number of electrons to the metal, and the donor atoms are arranged in a fac manner covering a face of a polyhedron.

The Tp and Tm ligands are isolobal with the Cp ligands. For example, the Cp manganese tricarbonyl complex is a half sandwich compound, with one face of the Cp ligand binding to the metal atom. The tricarbonyl manganese complex of trithia-9-crown-3 has the three sulfur atoms binding to the metal atom in the same place as the Cp ligand and using the same sort of orbitals for the bonding.

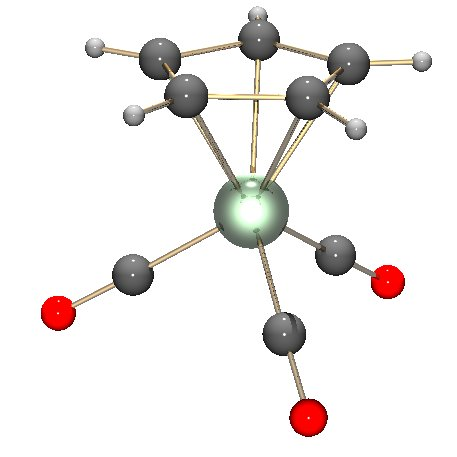
Cyclopentadienyl manganese tricarbonyl

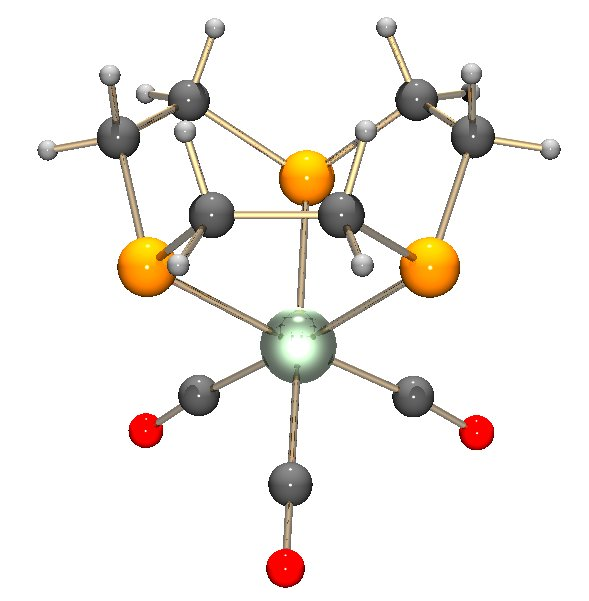
Trithia-9-crown-3 manganese tricarbonyl

While the geometry of the Tp ligands do not allow the formation of simple borane complexes with the metals, the geometry of the Tm ligands (and sometimes their bidentate versions Bm) are such that with late transition metals such as osmium and platinum it is possible to turn the Tm ligand inside out to form a borane to which the metal forms a dative bond.

Here is the manganese complex of Tm with (again three carbonyls).

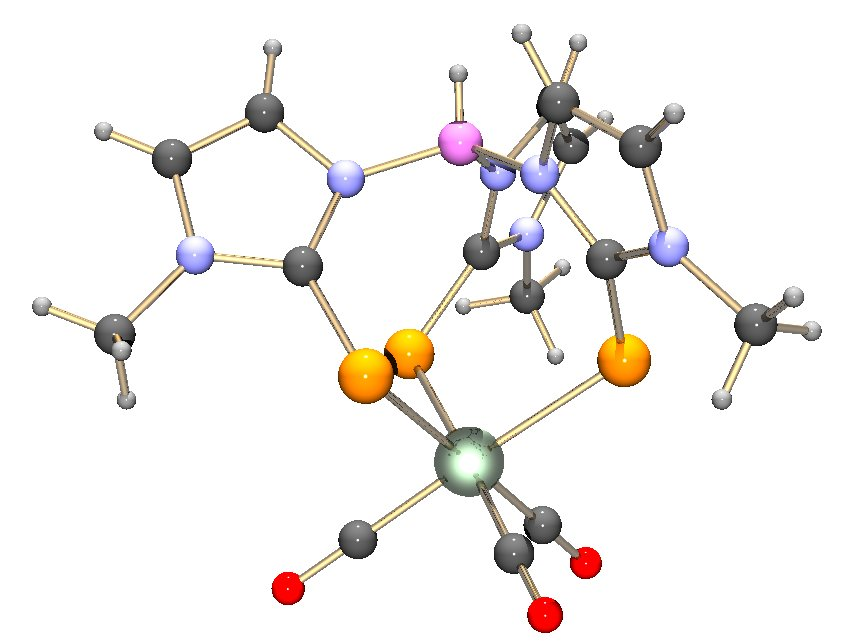

== Tp class ==
The tris(pyrazolyl)borate ligand is often known as Tp to many inorganic chemists - using different pyrazoles substituted in the 3,4, and 5 positions, a range of different ligands can be formed. In this article we will group all the trispyrazolylborates together.

These compounds are usually synthesized by reacting pyrazole with alkali-metal borohydrides, such as sodium borohydride NaBH_{4}, under reflux. H_{2} is evolved as the borohydride is sequentially converted first to pyrazolylborate [H_{3}B(C_{3}N_{2}H_{3})], then to bis(pyrazolyl)borate [H_{2}B(C_{3}N_{2}H_{3})_{2}], and finally to tris(pyrazolyl)borate [HB(C_{3}N_{2}H_{3})_{3}]. Bulky pyrazolyl borates can be prepared from 3,5-disubstituted pyrazoles, such as the dimethyl derivative. These bulky pyrazolyl borates have proven especially valuable in the preparation of catalysts and models for enzyme active sites. Utilizing scorpionate ligands in the syntheses of metal catalysts may allow simpler and more accurate methods to be developed. Ligands allow for good shielding of the bound metal while strong sigma bonds between the nitrogens and the metal stabilize the metal; these attributes help scorpionate compounds with creating highly symmetrical supramolecular silver complexes and olefin polymerization (with the compound hydrotris(pyrazolyl) borate Mn).

== Tm class ==
By replacing the nitrogen donor of a Tp ligand atoms with sulfur atoms, a class of ligands known as Tm can be made. These are related to the thioureas.¹; Several research groups including Anthony F. Hill's group have been working on this ligand class. To form NaTm {Na^{+} HB(mt)_{3}^{−}), Methimazole and sodium borohydride are heated together.

Coordination chemistry with ruthenium, rhodium, osmium, molybdenum, tungsten, and other metals has been reported.

== Other ==
A range of tripodal phosphines such as HC(CH_{2}PR_{2})_{3}, N(CH_{2}CH_{2}PPh_{2})_{3} and P(CH_{2}CH_{2}PMe_{2})_{3} have been reviewed. The tetra amine (tris(2-aminoethyl)amine) can be reacted with salicylaldehyde to form a ligand which can bind with three oxygens and three nitrogens to a metal. Tris(pyrazolyl)methane (Tpm) is another class of scorpionate ligands, notable for having identical geometry and very similar coordination chemistry to Tp with only a difference in charge between them. Another variation is the Trisoxazolinylborate ligand.

Hydrotris(pyrazolyl)aluminate (Tpa) complexes have similar coordination geometries to Tp complexes, however Tpa ligands are more reactive due to the weaker Al-N and Al-H bonds, compared to B-N and B-H bonds of Tp ligands, which results in either Tpa ligand transfer, pyrazolate transfer, or hydride transfer with MX_{2} (M = Mg, Mn, Fe, Co, Ni, Cu, Zn; X = Cl, Br).

== See also ==
- Pincer ligands
