= Semicorrin =

Semicorrins are a class of chiral, C_{2}-symmetric, bidentate nitrogen-donor ligands derived from pyroglutamic acid. Structurally inspired by natural corrinoid and porphinoid metal complexes, semicorrins are characterized by a rigid framework containing a vinylogous amidine system embedded in a bicyclic structure. Semicorrins have been designed specifically for use in asymmetric catalysis and have shown high enantioselectivity in several transition metal-catalyzed transformations, particularly with copper and cobalt complexes. The conformational rigidity and C_{2}-symmetry of semicorrins restrict the number of possible catalyst–substrate arrangements and thereby the number of competing diastereomeric transition states.

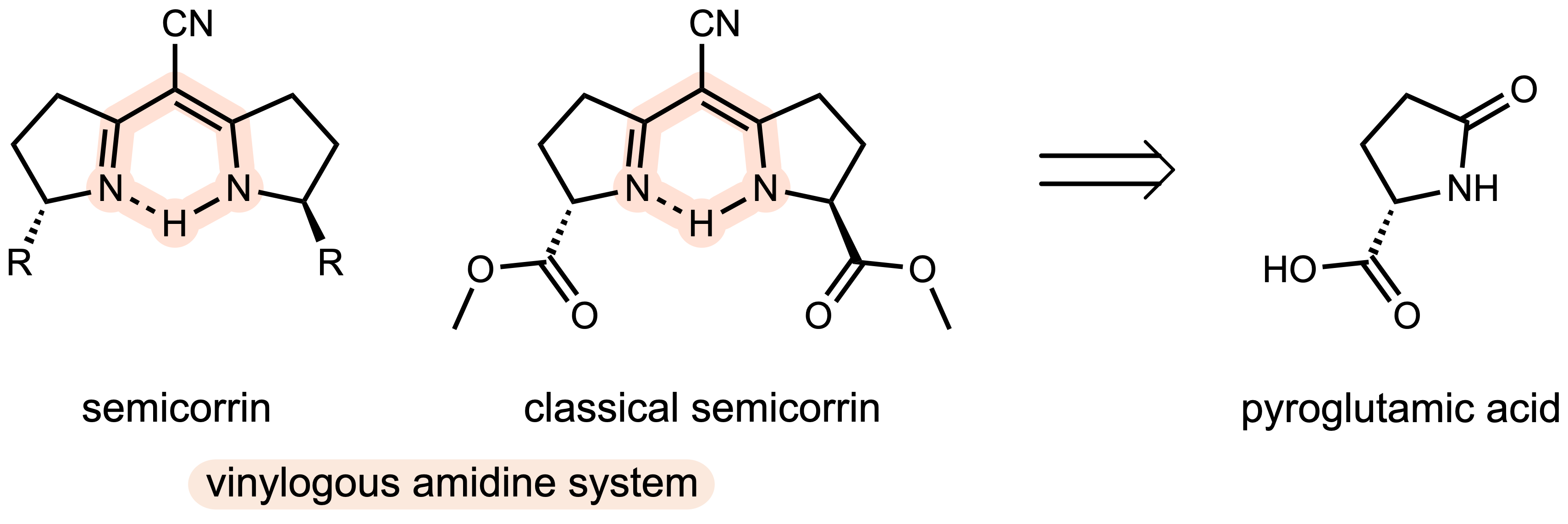
Semicorrin ligand

Semicorrins readily form chelate complexes with a range of transition metals, including Co(II), Cu(II), Ni(II), Pd(II), and Rh(I). Depending on the metal ion, ligand structure, and reaction conditions, both mono- and bis(semicorrinato) complexes can be synthesized. For example, a stable, hydroxyisopropyl-substituted mono(semicorrinato)copper(II) complex was prepared with copper(II) acetate under neutral conditions; this complex could be converted to the corresponding bis(semicorrinato)copper(II) complex by the addition of base.

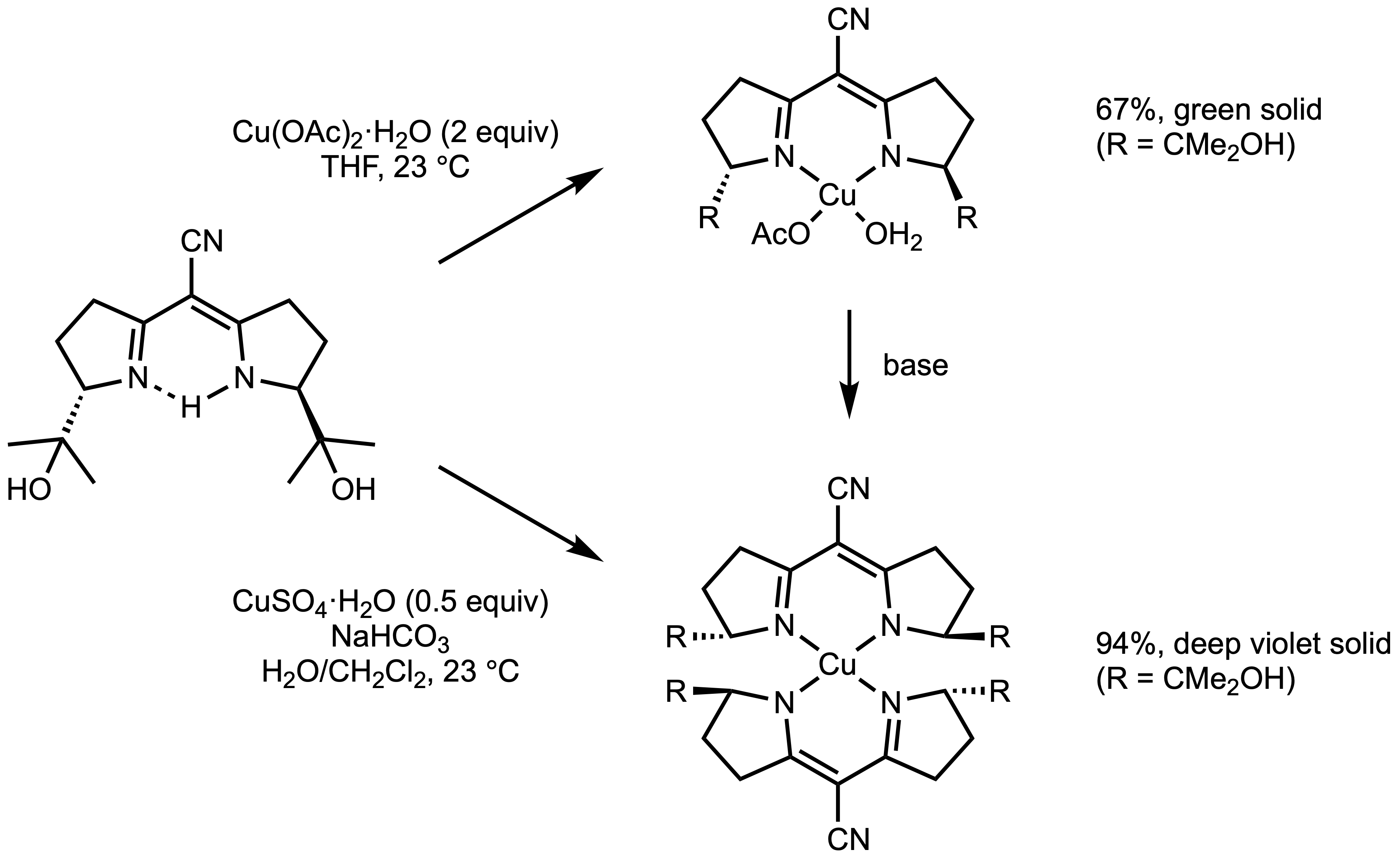
Semicorrin complexes

== History ==
Inspired by earlier work from Eschenmoser's group, as well as foundational studies by Noyori and Aratani on chiral salicylaldimine ligands for asymmetric carbenoid cyclopropanation, semicorrin ligands were first developed in the 1980s by Pfaltz and coworkers at ETH Zürich. Semicorrins had originally been synthesized as intermediates in the total synthesis of corrinoid and hydroporphinoid compounds like vitamin B_{12} (cobalamin) or coenzyme F_{430}, a hydroporphinoid nickel complex involved in bacterial methanogenesis. With a background in corrin chemistry from his graduate work in Eschenmoser's laboratory, Pfaltz recognized that the vinylogous amidine motif found in corrinoid and porphinoid ligands could serve as a starting point for designing C_{2}-symmetric ligands for metal-catalyzed reactions. He hypothesized that such ligands could exert strong stereocontrol in asymmetric reactions if chirality elements were placed near the coordination sites.

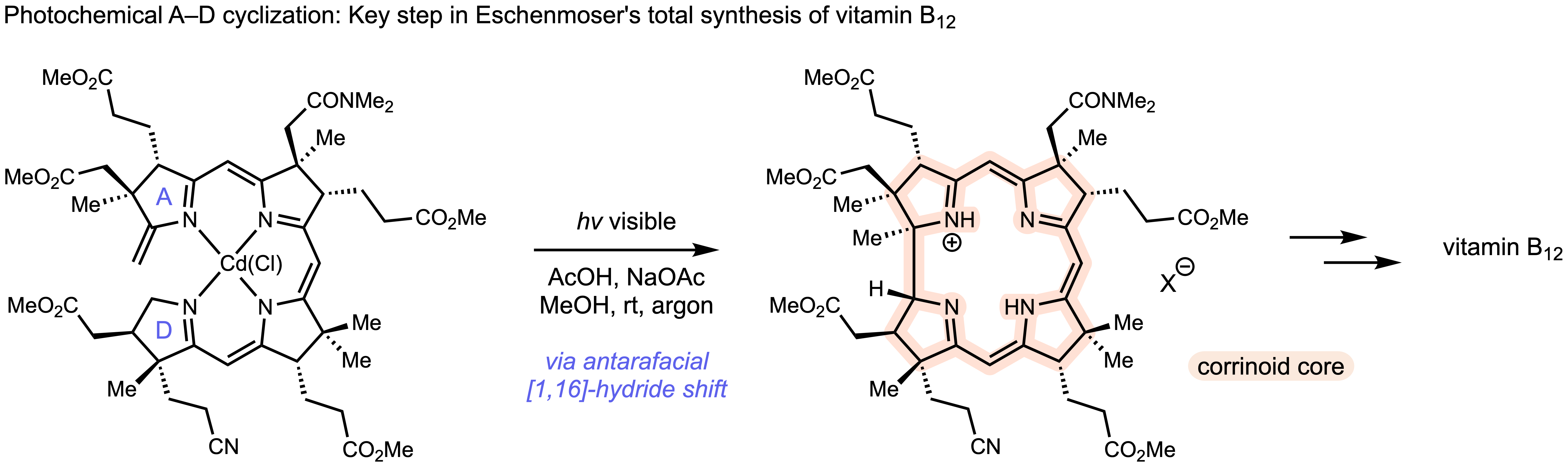
Corrinoid core of vitamin B12

== Synthesis ==
Semicorrins feature a bicyclic structure connected via a central vinylogous amidine system. Each pyrrole-derived ring features a stereogenic center adjacent to the metal coordination site, enabling effective asymmetric induction due to the close proximity of chirality to the metal center. The classical synthetic route to semicorrins involves condensation of an imino ester (2) with an enamine (5), both derived from commercially available (+)- or (−)-pyroglutamic acid (1). This strategy was first devised by Eschenmoser during his synthetic studies towards the corrin system and later adapted for chiral ligand synthesis by Pfaltz. Pfaltz's route proceeds via methanolysis of 1 to afford methyl pyroglutamate, treatment with Meerwein's salt to give imino ester 2, condensation with 3 to yield enamine 4, and decarboxylation under acidic conditions to afford enamine 5. Condensation of fragments 2 and 5 under acidic conditions (e.g. trifluoroacetic acid) then yields semicorrin ligand 6, which can be obtained on a multigram scale in overall yields of 30–40%.

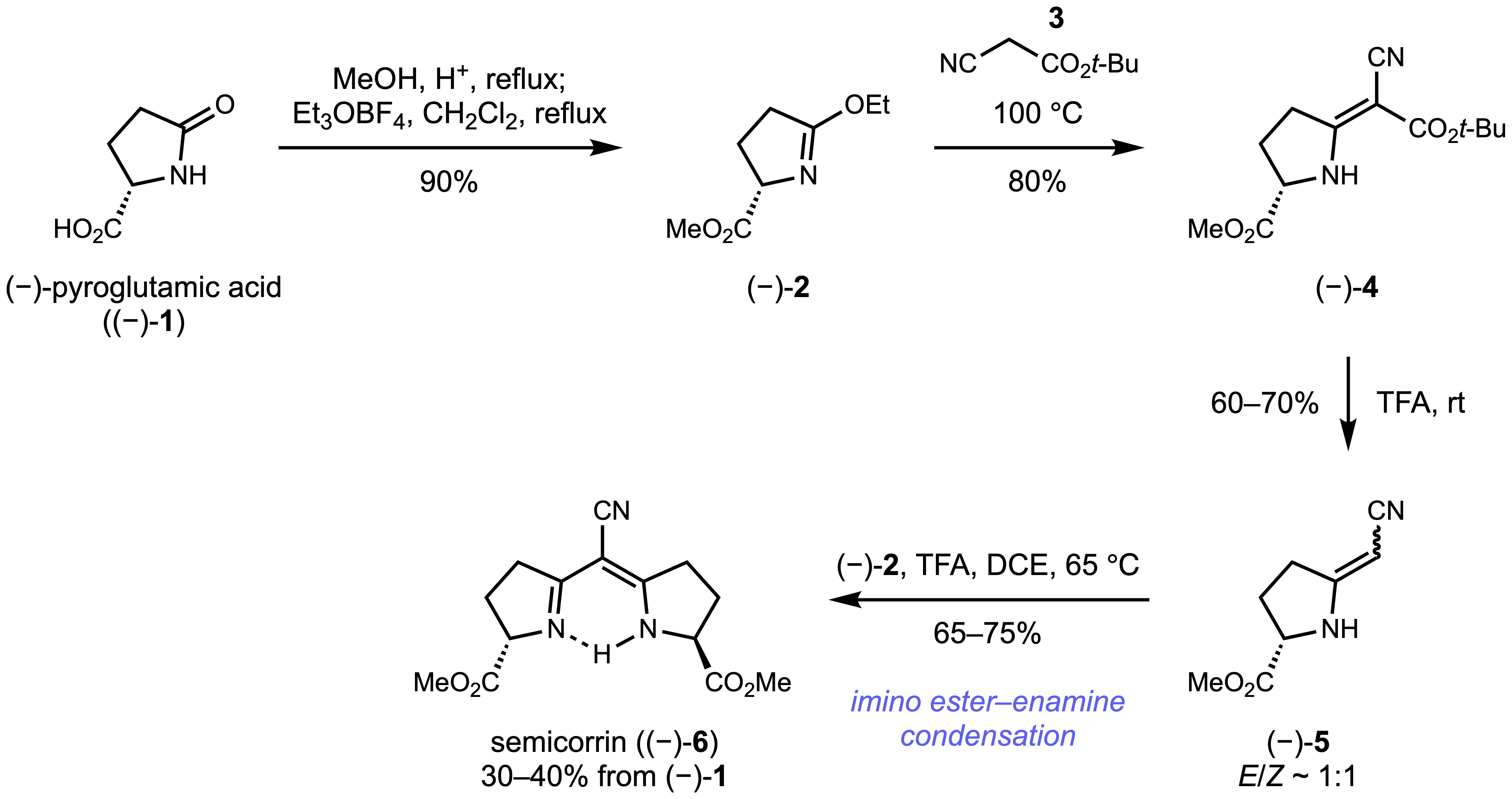
Semicorrin synthesis

The resulting ligands can be further modified at the ester substituents to tune steric and electronic properties. Common derivatives include the sterically demanding hydroxyisopropyl (10, from methyl Grignard addition to 6) and (trialkylsilyloxy)methyl semicorrins (11, from reduction of 6 followed by silylation of the resulting alcohol 7), which have proven useful in asymmetric catalysis. Alternatively, the substituents at the stereogenic centers can be diversified early in the synthesis by modifying the carboxyl group of pyroglutamic acid.

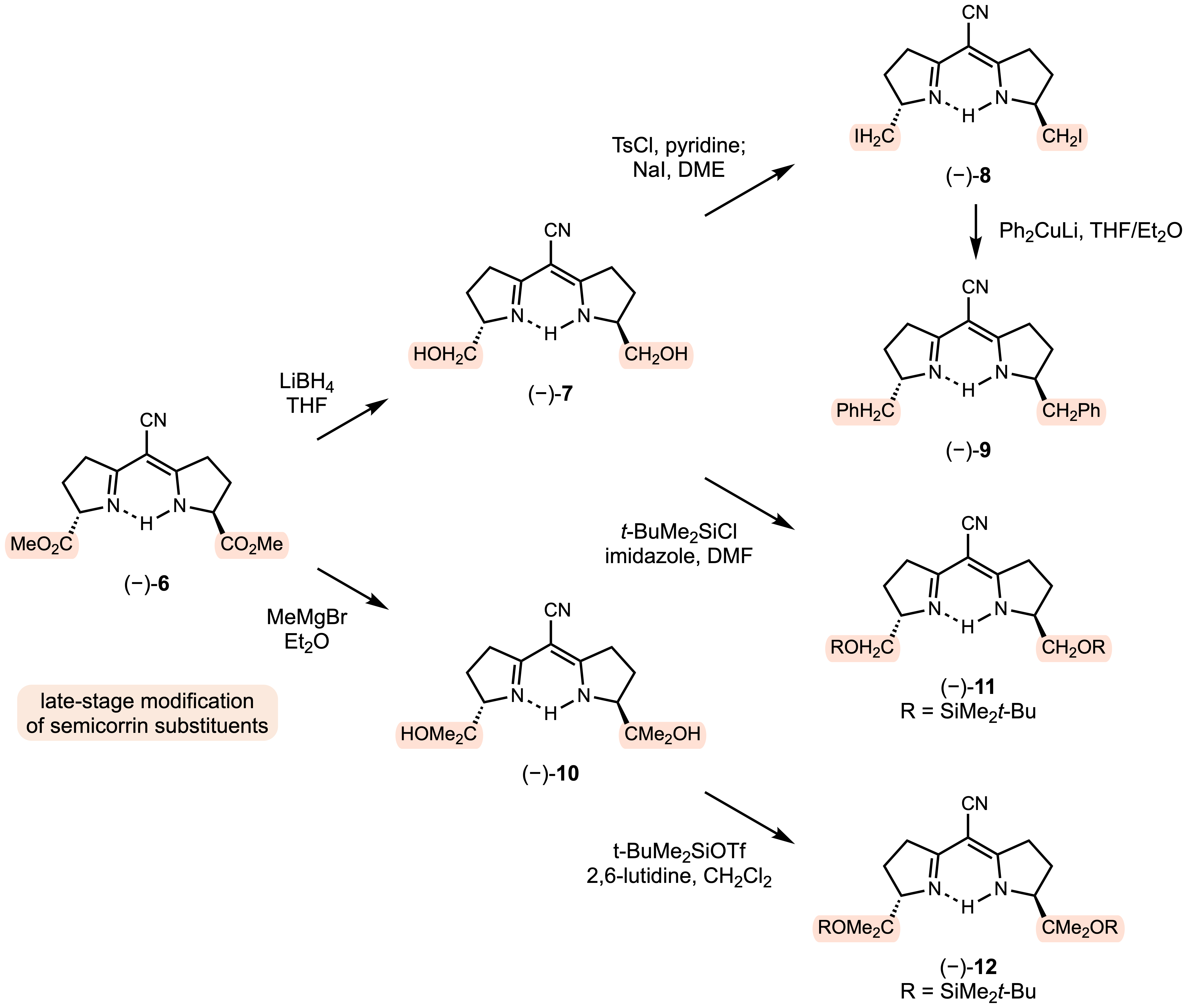
Semicorrin modification

== Applications in asymmetric catalysis ==
=== Copper-catalyzed cyclopropanations ===
The first successful application of semicorrin complexes was Pfaltz's copper-catalyzed, enantioselective cyclopropanation of alkenes with α-diazo esters, affording enantioenriched cyclopropanecarboxylates. This work was inspired by Noyori's and Aratani's pioneering studies with (salicylaldiminato)copper(II) catalysts. In Pfaltz's protocol, a stable bis(semicorrinato)copper(II) complex (1) serves as a catalyst precursor. The active catalyst, which is presumed to be a mono(semicorrinato)copper(I) complex (2), is formed in situ either by heating in the presence of the diazo compound or by reduction with phenylhydrazine at room temperature. Alternatively, the active copper(I) catalyst can be generated in situ from the free ligand and copper(I) tert-butoxide.

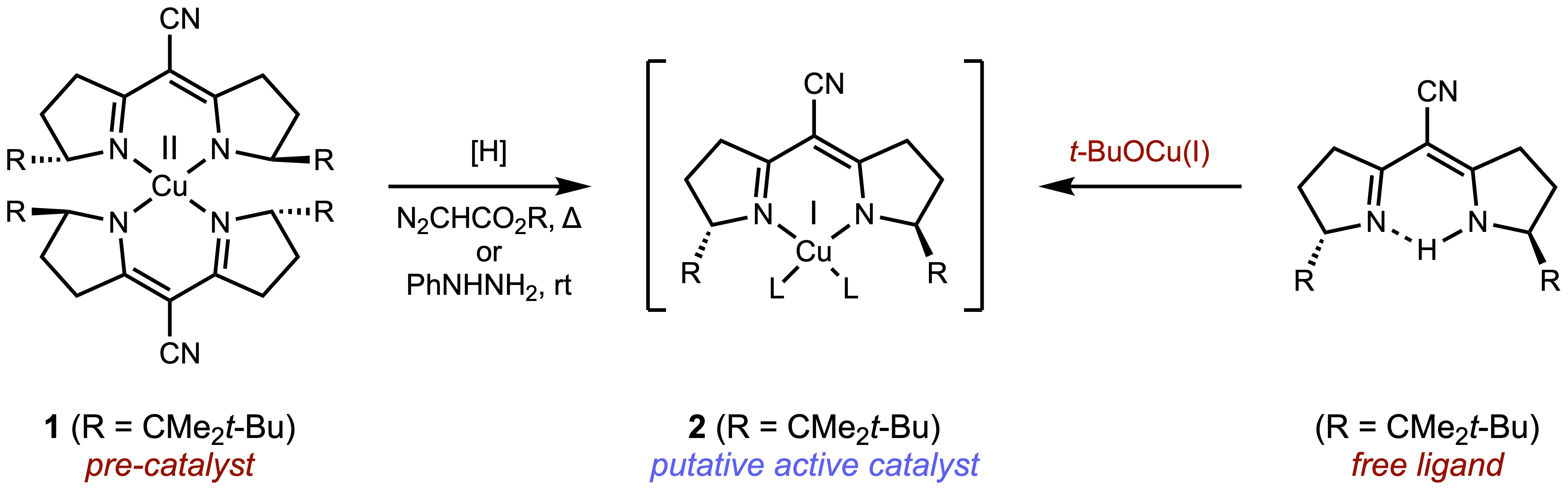
Cyclopropanation active catalyst

High enantioselectivities were obtained with terminal alkenes, dienes, and some 1,2-disubstituted alkenes. While Pfaltz's (semicorrinato)copper catalysts provide excellent enantioselectivities with monosubstituted alkenes, their performance with 1,2-di- and trisubstituted alkenes is surpassed by Aratani's (salicylaldiminato)copper catalysts. Moderate trans/cis-selectivity is a common limitation of both systems (vide infra). Besides Pfaltz's and Aratani's catalysts, chiral copper(I) bis(oxazoline) (BOX), dinuclear rhodium(II) carboxylate, amidate, or phosphate, and ruthenium(II) diphosphine complexes have also exhibited strong enantiocontrol in diazo-mediated cyclopropanations.

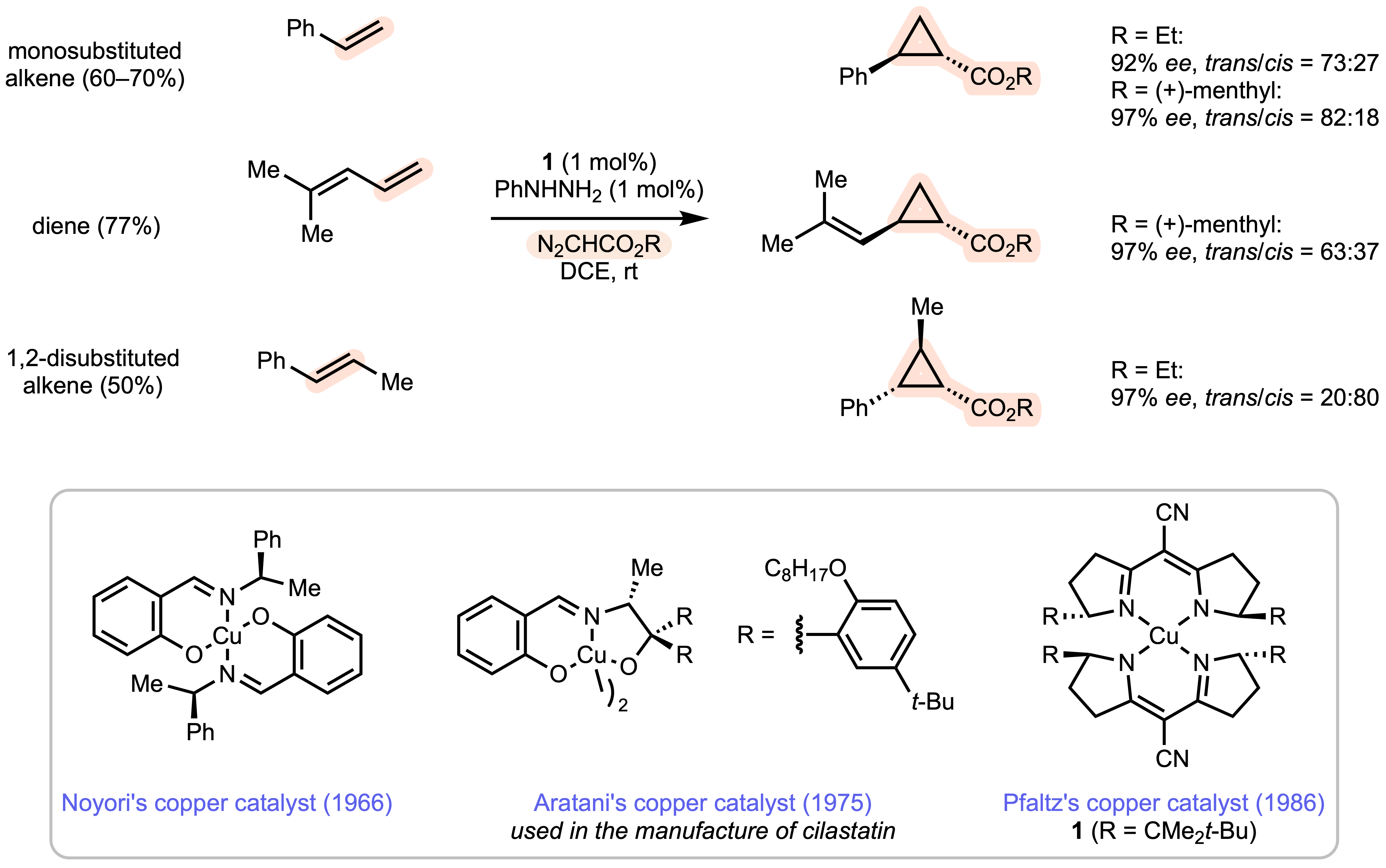
Cyclopropanation of olefins

(Semicorrinato)copper complexes have also been employed in the intramolecular, enantioselective cyclopropanation of alkenyl diazo ketones, affording moderate to high enantioselectivities. With the same substrates, low to moderate enantioselectivities were observed using Aratani's (salicylaldiminato)copper(II) catalysts. On the other hand, allyl diazoacetates showed significantly lower enantioselectivities under Pfaltz's conditions. This selectivity trend is reversed for chiral rhodium(II) complexes, which provide high enantioselectivities with allyl diazoacetates and low enantioselectivities with alkenyl diazo ketones.

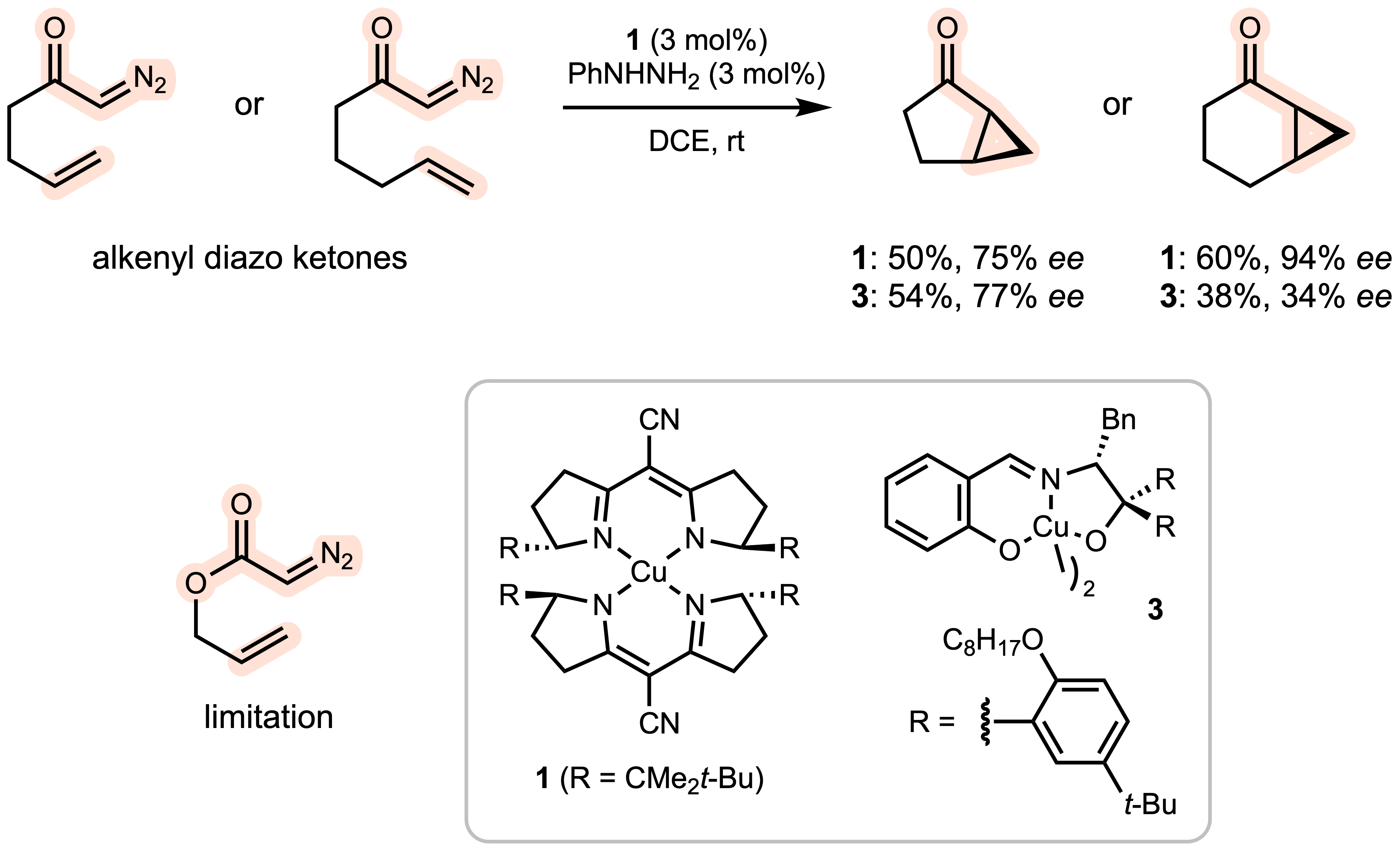
Cyclopropanation of other compounds

A mechanistic rationale for the high stereoselectivity observed in cyclopropanations catalyzed by (semicorrinato)copper complexes was proposed by Pfaltz. In line with the commonly accepted mechanism of transition metal-catalyzed reactions with diazo compounds, Pfaltz suggested that the active (semicorrinato)copper(I) catalyst reacts with the diazo compound to generate a copper carbene intermediate (4). The carbene ligand is oriented to minimize steric interaction with the R^{1} substituents of the semicorrin ligand and to maximize bonding interactions with the incoming alkene. The alkene approaches with the more substituted side facing away from the semicorrin ligand. Carbene transfer to the alkene can then proceed from either side of the semicorrin ligand (pathways a and b). Depending on the direction of attack, the carboxy group at the carbenoid center either moves forward (pathway a) or backward (pathway b) relative to the plane bisecting the semicorrin ligand. In the latter case, a repulsive steric interaction occurs between the carboxy group and the R^{1} substituent of the semicorrin ligand, which corresponds to the minor transition state. Pathway a, which leads to either the trans-(1S)- or cis-(1S)-cyclopropanecarboxylate, does not experience such a steric interaction and is therefore expected to be favored, consistent with the experimental findings. This model also explains why the trans/cis selectivity depends predominantly on the structures of the alkene and diazo compound, while the effect of the catalyst structure is negligible. For example, the trans/cis ratio increases when ethyl diazoacetate is replaced by bulkier diazo esters.

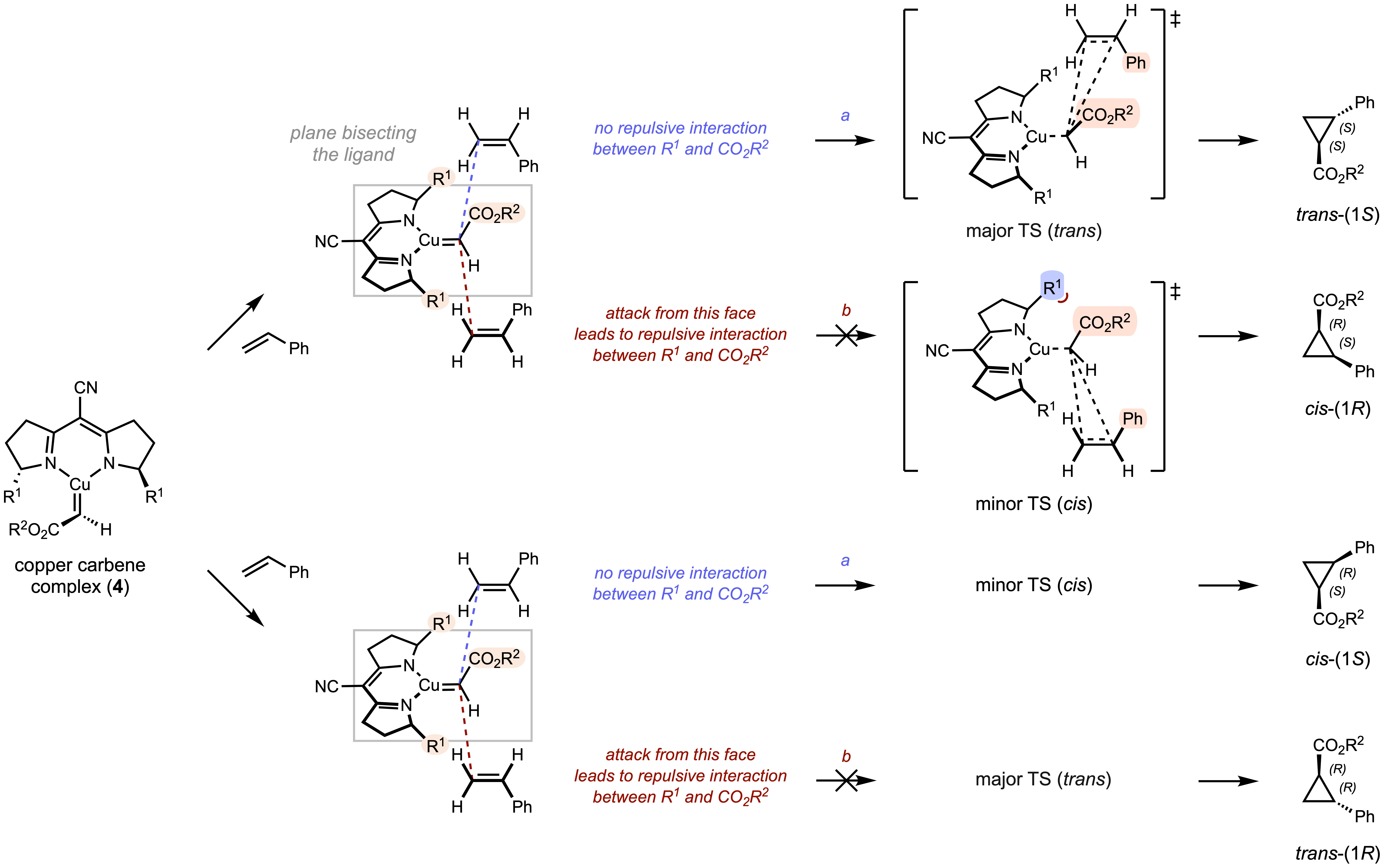
Cyclopropanation origin of stereoselectivity

=== Cobalt-catalyzed reductions ===
Another successful application of semicorrin complexes is Pfaltz's cobalt-catalyzed, enantioselective conjugate reduction of β-substituted, α,β-unsaturated esters and amides, yielding enantioenriched saturated products. Inspired by earlier work from Fischli on a moderately enantioselective, vitamin B_{12}-catalyzed conjugate reduction of similar substrates, Pfaltz discovered that (semicorrinato)cobalt complexes, generated in situ from cobalt(II) chloride and free ligand, catalyze the conjugate reduction of α,β-unsaturated esters in quantitative yields and with high enantioselectivity. Using sodium borohydride as the reducing agent, reactions were carried out at room temperature under inert atmosphere in a mixture of ethanol and dimethylformamide. Due to the acid sensitivity of the semicorrin ligand, acidic reducing agents such as zinc/acetic acid or even zinc/ammonium chloride proved unsuitable. The reaction is stereospecific, affording either the (R)- or (S)-enantiomer depending on the double bond configuration of the substrate. Isolated double bonds were inert under reaction conditions, and no reduction of conjugated double bonds occurred in the absence of catalyst. Pfaltz's method has been successfully applied in total synthesis, including in Kocienski's synthesis of pseudopterosin aglycones and White's synthesis of (+)-kalkitoxin.

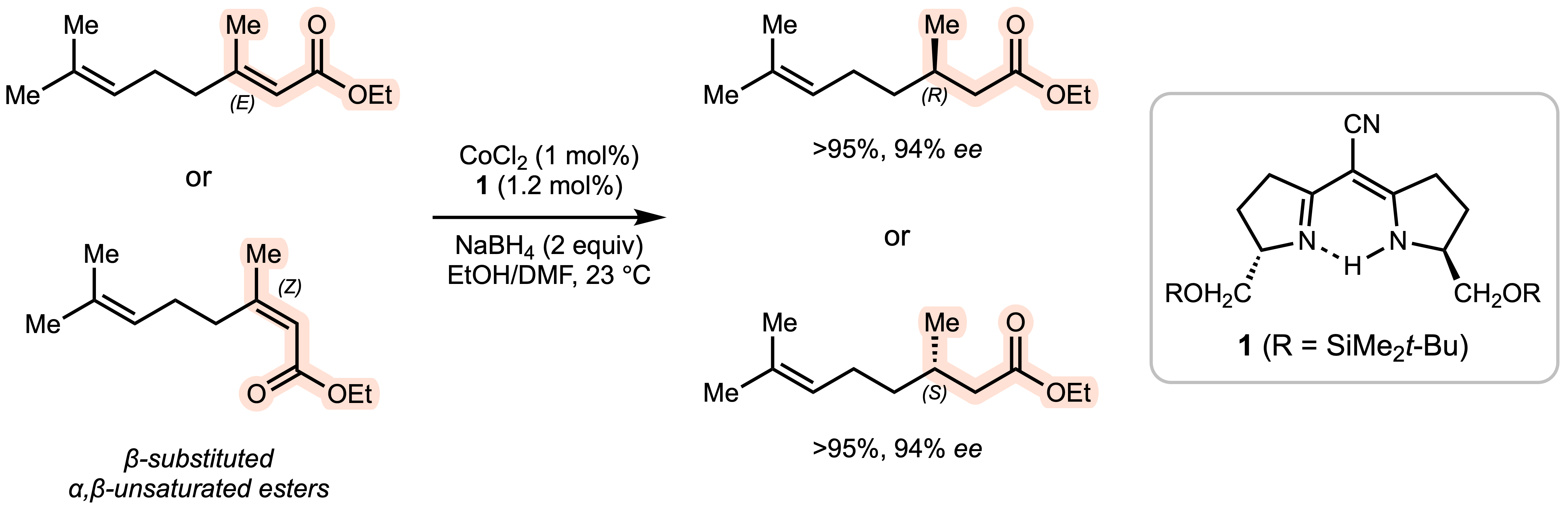
Conjugate reduction of esters

The reduction of β-substituted, α,β-unsaturated primary and secondary amides could be achieved under the same reaction conditions, affording quantitative yields and even higher enantioselectivities (up to 99% ee). Tertiary amides reacted sluggishly and with distinctly lower selectivity. In the case of amides with extended conjugation, only the α,β-double bond was reduced (>95:5 r.r.). Beyond esters and amides, cobalt semicorrin catalysts have also enabled moderately enantioselective reductions of β-substituted, α,β-unsaturated nitriles, phosphonates, and sulfones. The method could, however, not be extended to α,β-unsaturated ketones, for which the uncatalyzed background reaction with sodium borohydride competes with the cobalt-catalyzed process.

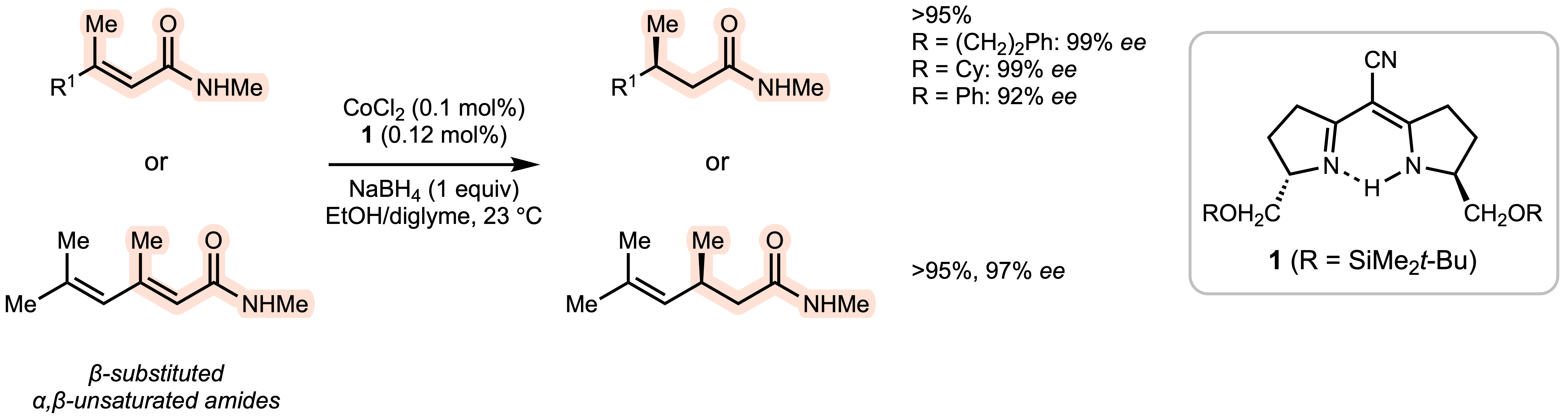
Conjugate reduction of amides

Pfaltz's conjugate reduction of β-substituted, α,β-unsaturated esters and amides was complementary to earlier methods using rhodium or ruthenium phosphine catalysts, such as Noyori's Ru(II)-BINAP complexes, which require the presence of a free carboxy, amide, or hydroxy function next to the double bond. Pfaltz's method was later adapted by Reiser, who optimized the reaction for cobalt(II) complexes of azabis(oxazoline) (azaBOX) ligands, which can be conveniently synthesized in three steps from the aminoalcohol chiral pool (see Related ligands). Further examples of catalysts for asymmetric conjugate reduction of α,β-unsaturated carbonyl compounds include chiral copper hydride catalysts developed by Buchwald and later Lipshutz, which evolved from Stryker's reagent; chiral aminocatalysts discovered independently by MacMillan and List, which employ Hantzsch ester as the hydride source; and more recently Cramer's chiral diazaphospholenes. Conjugate reductions have also been reported with various other transition metals such as Rh, Ru, Pd, and Ni, although Co and Cu remain the most widely employed.

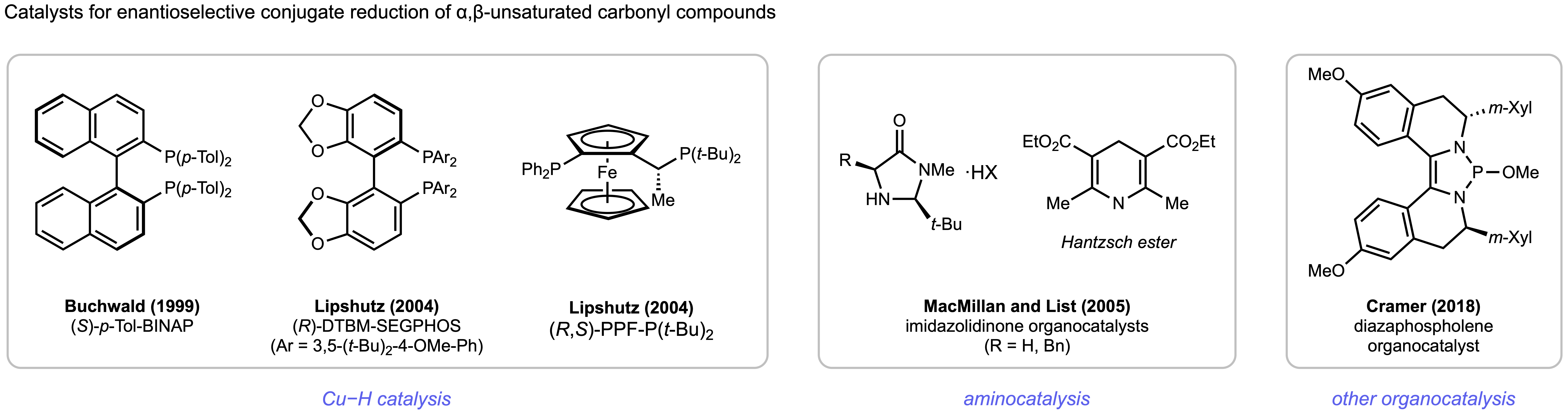
Conjugate reduction other catalysts

Deuterium labeling experiments revealed that the β-H atom in the product originates from the borohydride, while the α-H atom is introduced via proton transfer from the alcohol solvent. Formation of the α-C–H bond was found to be non-stereoselective in experiments with α-substituted substrates, leading to racemic mixtures. These observations are consistent with the commonly invoked mechanism of cobalt-catalyzed conjugate reduction, although direct mechanistic evidence remains scarce. A cobalt hydride species (2), which can undergo 1,4-addition to the substrate, is typically proposed as the active catalyst. Several mechanistic pathways can be envisioned for the conjugate addition step. One possibility involves coordination of the substrate to cobalt followed by inner-sphere hydride transfer via a six-membered cyclic transition state (3). The resulting cobalt enolate (4) could then undergo protodemetalation to furnish the product, while the cobalt hydride catalyst is regenerated via transmetalation with borohydride. Alternatively, the cobalt enolate itself could participate directly in transmetalation with the reducing agent, affording the regenerated cobalt hydride and, upon quenching, the saturated product.

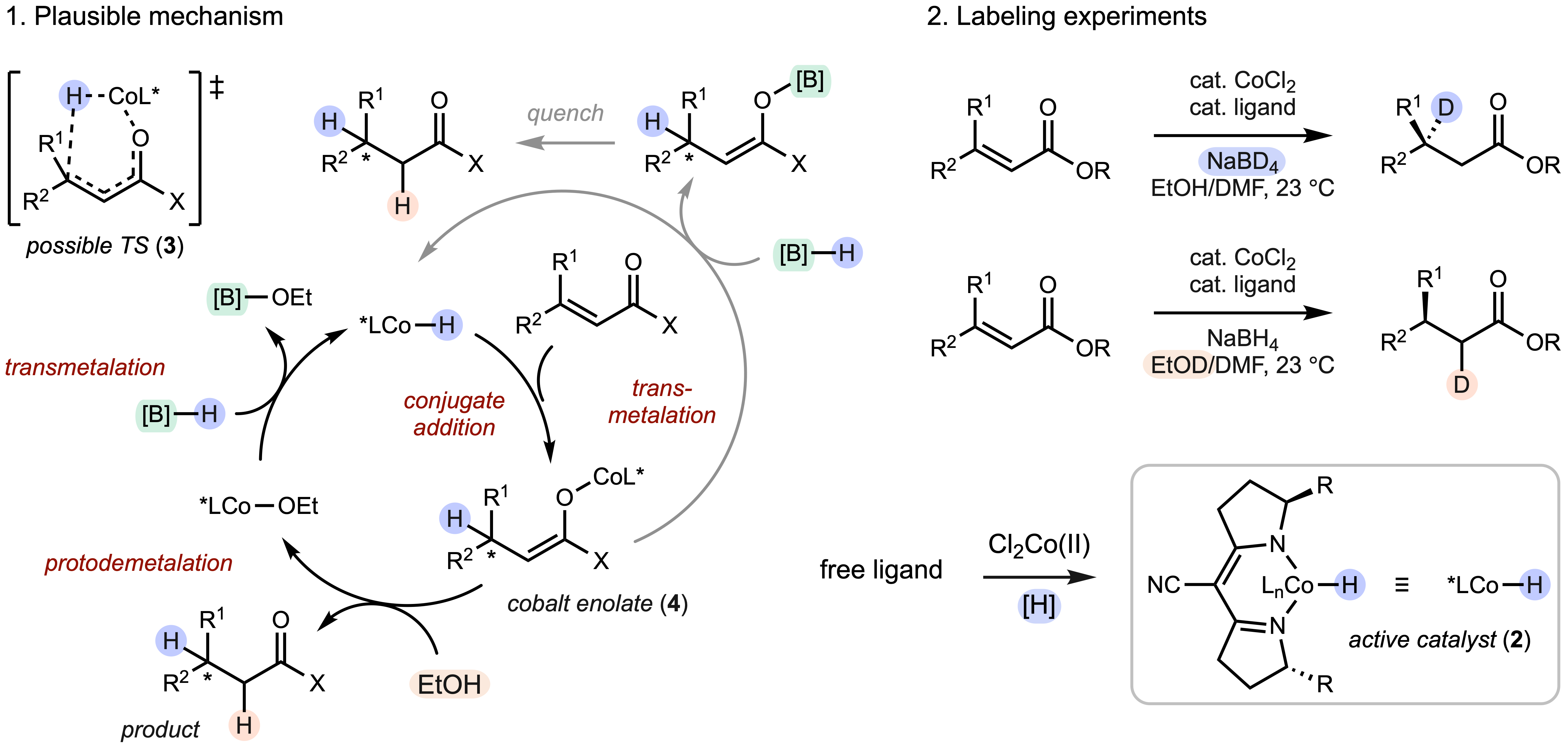
Conjugate reduction mechanism

== Related ligands ==
=== History ===
Semicorrins are historically important because they were part of a surge in the development of C_{2}-symmetric ligands for asymmetric catalysis. Previous studies by Noyori and Aratani on chiral copper salicylaldimine catalysts for asymmetric carbenoid cyclopropanation led to Brunner's discovery of chiral oxazoline ligands in 1984. Although these ligands were not effective in cyclopropanation, affording only 5% ee, they inspired the development of pyridine-oxazoline (PyOX, 1) ligands. PyOX were introduced by Brunner in 1986 as chiral ligands for the enantioselective monophenylation of diols, achieving up to 30% ee in initial studies. That same year, Pfaltz reported a highly enantioselective carbenoid cyclopropanation catalyzed by a copper semicorrin complex, which reached remarkable enantioselectivities of up to 97%. Despite their high performance, these ligands were never widely adopted by the synthetic community due to their lengthy, low-yielding synthesis (see Synthesis).

Brunner's work on oxazoline ligands inspired the development of tridentate pyridine-bis(oxazoline) (PyBOX, 2) ligands by Nishiyama, who in 1989 reported a highly enantioselective hydrosilylation of ketones with enantiomeric excesses of up to 94%. A year later, Masamune introduced bis(oxazoline) (BOX, 3) ligands in the context of asymmetric carbenoid cyclopropanation. The same ligands were independently developed by Evans, Pfaltz, and Corey for enantioselective cyclopropanation and Diels–Alder reactions, as reported in 1991. These studies achieved exceptionally high enantioselectivities, affording enantioenriched products in up to 99% optical purity. The impressive results obtained with semicorrin and BOX ligands prompted the development of many other C_{2}-symmetric, bidentate nitrogen-donor ligands in the subsequent years. Notable examples include bi(oxazolines) (BiOX, 4), reported by Helmchen in 1991 for the enantioselective hydrosilylation of ketones; aza-semicorrins (5), introduced by Pfaltz in 1992 for enantioselective carbenoid cyclopropanation and allylic substitution; and aza-bis(oxazolines) (AzaBOX, 7), developed by Reiser in 2000 for similar applications.

Another structurally related but less commonly used example is cyano-bis(oxazoline) (CN-BOX, 6), first employed by Corey in 1993 for the enantioselective formation of cyanohydrins from aldehydes. More recently, these ligands were applied to the enantioselective decarboxylative arylation of α-amino acids by MacMillan and Fu. Semicorrins and CN-BOX are L,X-type ligands that act as σ- and π-electron donors, while aza-semicorrins and oxazoline-derived ligands are typically L,L-type (or L,L,L-type in the case of PyBOX) ligands that tend to be weaker σ-donors or even π-acceptors. Out of these ligands, PyOX, PyBOX, and BiOX are probably the most widely used after the ubiquitous BOX ligands.

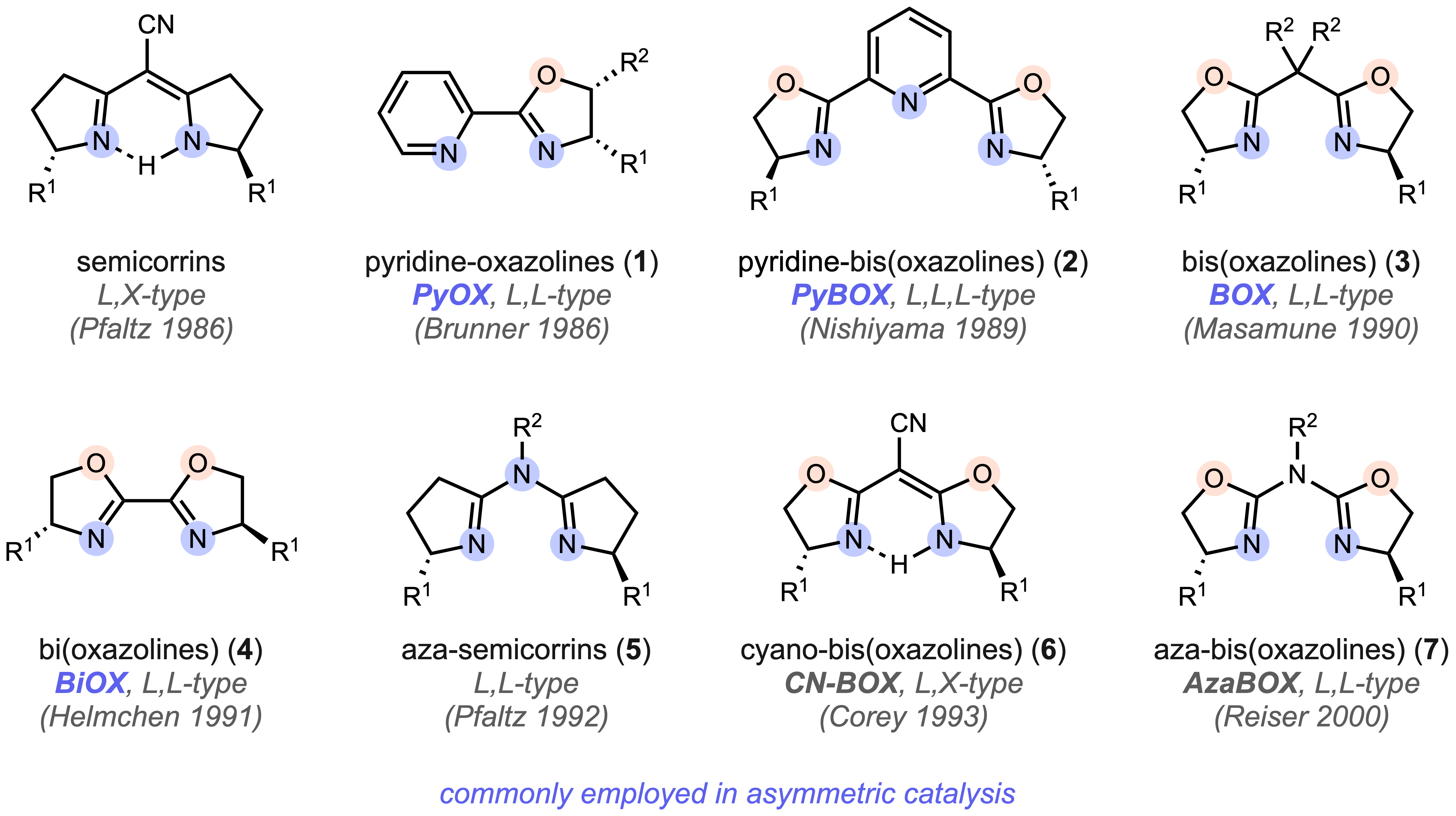
Semicorrin related ligands

=== Synthesis ===
Chiral bis(oxazolines) are attractive ligands because they are easily accessible from aminoalcohols. A wide variety of enantiomerically pure aminoalcohols are commercially available while others are conveniently prepared by lithium aluminum hydride reduction of α-amino acids. Several methods have been developed for the synthesis of BOX ligands. One of the most common approaches, pioneered by Corey, involves the condensation of aminoalcohols and malonyl chlorides with triethylamine, followed by treatment with thionyl chloride and subsequent base-promoted cyclization. An alternative method, introduced by Fischer and Lehn, relies on the condensation of aminoalcohols and malonimidate hydrochloride salts. Malonimidate hydrochlorides are commercially available but can also be readily prepared by treatment of malononitrile with hydrochloric acid in an alcohol solvent. A third strategy, first reported by Witte in 1974 and later adapted by Bolm for ligand synthesis, enables the direct condensation of aminoalcohols and malononitrile in the presence of catalytic zinc(II) chloride.

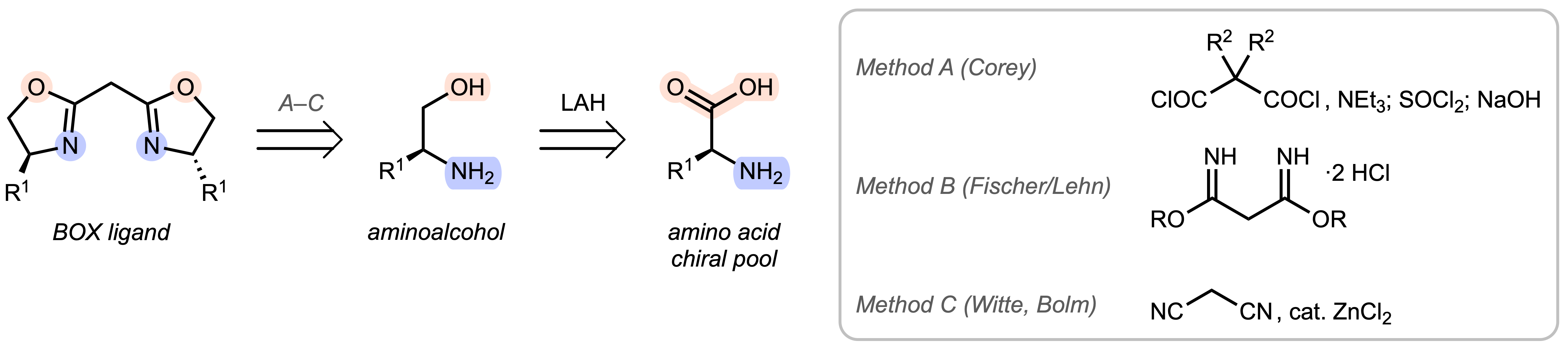
BOX synthesis

== See also ==
- Enantioselective synthesis
- C2-Symmetric ligands
- Bisoxazoline ligand
- Oxazoline
- Vitamin B12 total synthesis
- Asymmetric hydrogenation
- Metal-catalyzed cyclopropanations
- Nucleophilic conjugate addition
- Copper hydride
