= Sea plume =

Sea plume may refer to:

- Antillogorgia, a genus of sea fans, including:
  - Antillogorgia americana, the slimy sea plume
  - Antillogorgia bipinnata, the bipinnate sea plume
- Asparagopsis taxiformis, the red sea plume, a species of red algae
- Muriceopsis flavida, the rough sea plume, an octocoral of the genus Muriceopsis
