= Erogorgiaene =

- 2D model of erogorgiaene

Names
- IUPAC name (1S,4R)-1,6-Dimethyl-4-[(2S)-6-methylhept-5-en-2-yl]-1,2,3,4-tetrahydronaphthalene

Identifiers
3D model (JSmol)	Interactive image
ChemSpider	7992643
PubChem CID	9816893
- InChI: InChI=1S/C20H30/c1-14(2)7-6-8-16(4)19-12-10-17(5)18-11-9-15(3)13-20(18)19/h7,9,11,13,16-17,19H,6,8,10,12H2,1-5H3/t16-,17-,19+/m0/s1 Key: JWQVCYABIGUFIY-JENIJYKNSA-N
- SMILES: C[C@H]1CC[C@@H](C2=C1C=CC(=C2)C)[C@@H](C)CCC=C(C)C

Properties
Chemical formula	C_{20}H_{30}
Molar mass	270.460 g·mol^{−1}
- Except where otherwise noted, data are given for materials in their standard state (at 25 °C [77 °F], 100 kPa). Infobox references

Erogorgiaene is a bicyclic compound found in marine octocoral Psuedoptergorgia elisabethae. It is used as an intermediate to synthesize pseudopterosin and is made by dehydrogenizing elisabethatriene so that a benzene ring is formed.

== Research ==
Erogorgiaene was found to have potential as an antibiotic against mycobacterium tuberculosis. However, limited natural supply and expensive chemical synthesis keeps the usage of the antiboitic very low.
