= Bisoxazoline ligand =

Class of chiral ligands

Bis(oxazoline) ligands (often abbreviated BOX ligands) are a family of organic compounds consisting of a linked pair of oxazoline rings. Chiral versions of the 2,2'-bisoxazolines have been of particular interest as ligands in homogeneous catalysis. They are sometimes called privileged chiral ligands.

== Synthesis ==
The synthesis of oxazoline rings is well established and in general proceeded via the cyclisation of a 2‑amino alcohol with any of a number of suitable functional groups. In the case of bis(oxazoline)s, synthesis is most conveniently achieved by using bi-functional starting materials; as this allows both rings to be produced at once. Of the materials suitable, dicarboxylic or dinitrile compounds are the most commonly available and hence the majority bis(oxazoline) ligands are produced from these materials.

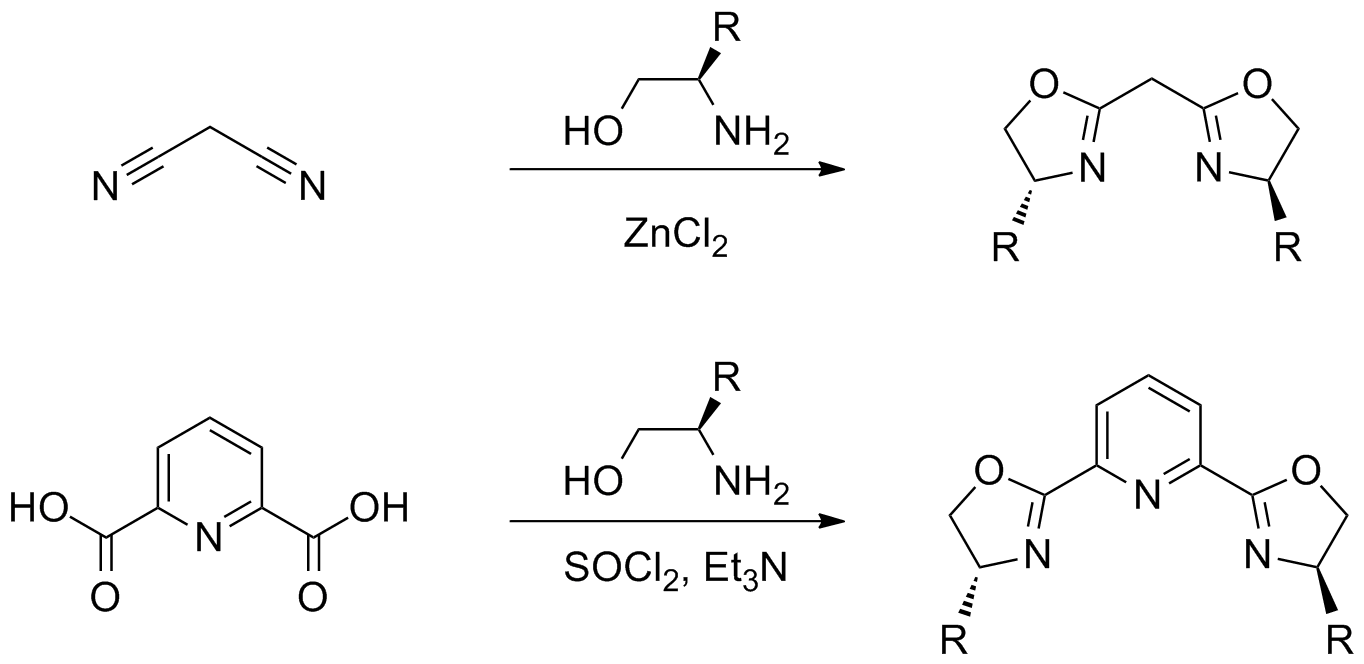

Part of the success of the BOX and PyBOX motifs lies in their convenient one step synthesis from malononitrile and dipicolinic acid, which are commercially available at low expense. Chirality is introduced with the amino alcohols, as these are prepared from amino acids and hence are chiral (e.g. valinol).

== Catalytic applications ==
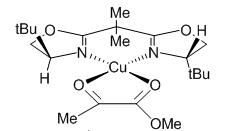
Structure of the proposed Cu-BOX adduct of ketoester substrate. 2+ charge not shown

The C2‑symmetric bisoxalines with CH_{2} or pyridine linkers (often generalised BOX and PyBOX respectively) have been employed in asymmetric catalysis. For the methylene bridged BOX ligands the stereochemical outcome is consistent with a twisted square planar intermediate. Enantioselectivity is observed for aldol-type reactions, Mannich-type reactions, ene reaction, Michael addition, Nazarov cyclization, and hetero-Diels-Alder reaction.

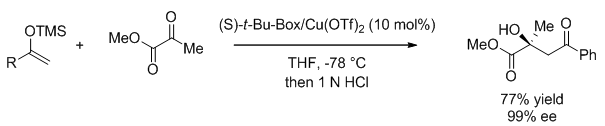
Box stereochemical model

On the other hand, two-point binding on a Lewis acid bearing the meridially tridentate PyBOX ligand would result in a square pyramidal complex. A study using (benzyloxy)acetaldehyde as the electrophile showed that the stereochemical outcome is consistent with the carbonyl oxygen binding equatorially and the ether oxygen binding axially.

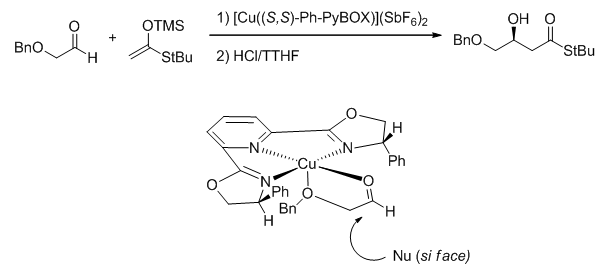
PyBox stereochemical model

Metal complexes incorporating bis(oxazoline) ligands are effective for a wide range of asymmetric catalytic transformations. The neutral character of bis(oxazoline)s makes them well suited to use with noble metals, with copper complexes being particularly common. Their most important and commonly used applications are in carbon–carbon bond forming reactions.

=== Carbon–carbon bond forming reactions ===
Complexes of bis(oxazoline)s catalyze a range of asymmetric cycloaddition reactions. The first application of BOX ligands in carbenoid cyclopropanations and has been expanded to include 1,3-Dipolar cycloaddition and Diels-Alder reactions. Bisoxazoline ligands have also been found to be effective for aldol, Michael, and ene reactions, amongst many others

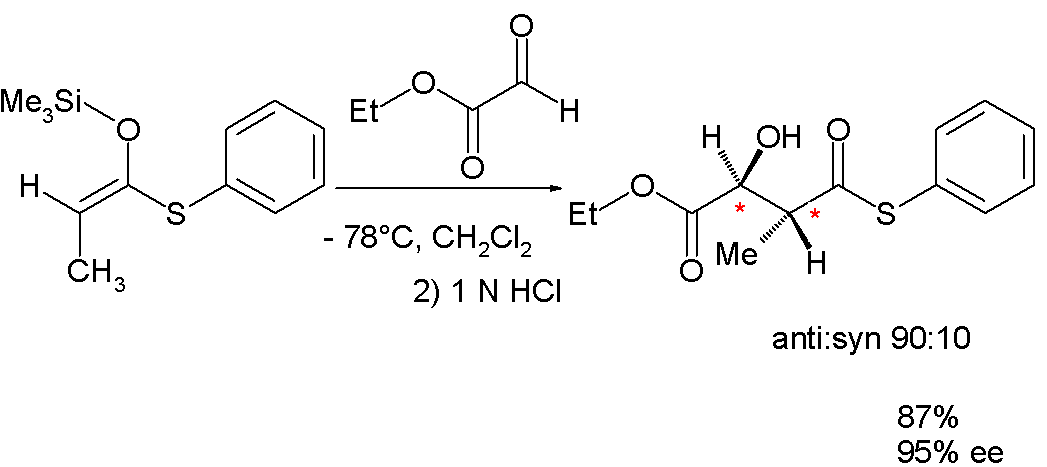
(DibenzylBOX)Sn(OTf)_{2}-catalyzed asymmetric aldol reaction.

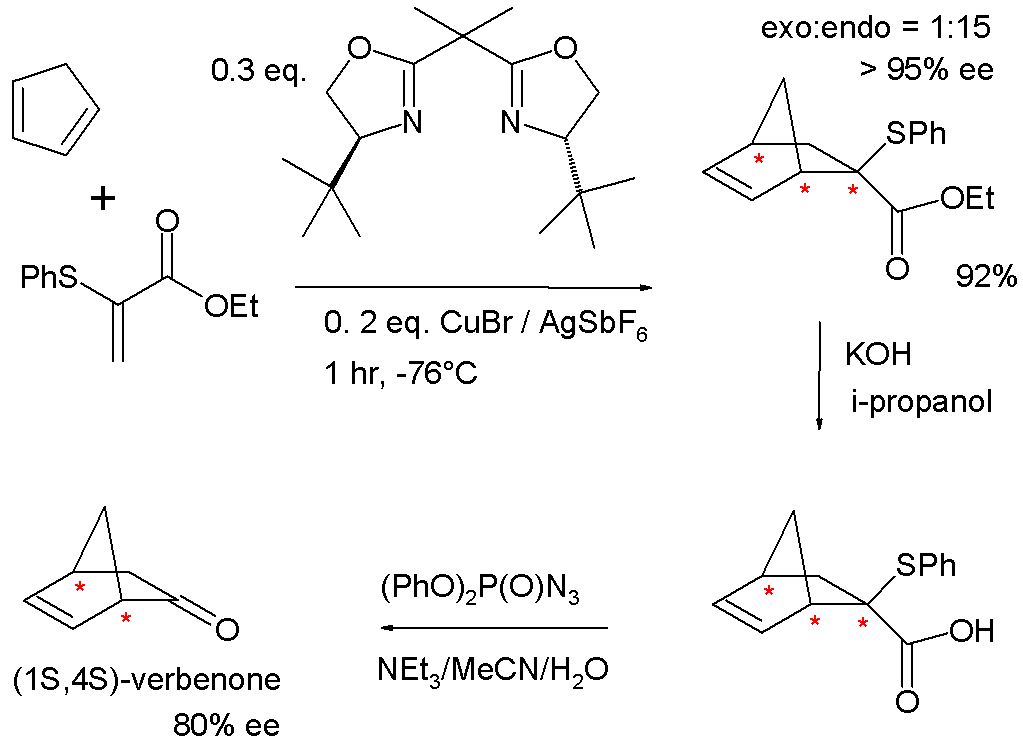
Aggarwal 1998: BOX assisted Diels-Alder reaction resulting in verbenone synthesis. The final conversion with diphenylphosphoryl azide involves a modified Curtius rearrangement

=== Other reactions ===
The success of bis(oxazoline) ligands for carbenoid cyclopropanations led to their application for aziridination. Another common reaction is hydrosilylation, which dates back to the first use of PyBOX ligands. Other niche applications include as fluorination catalysts and for Wacker-type cyclisations.

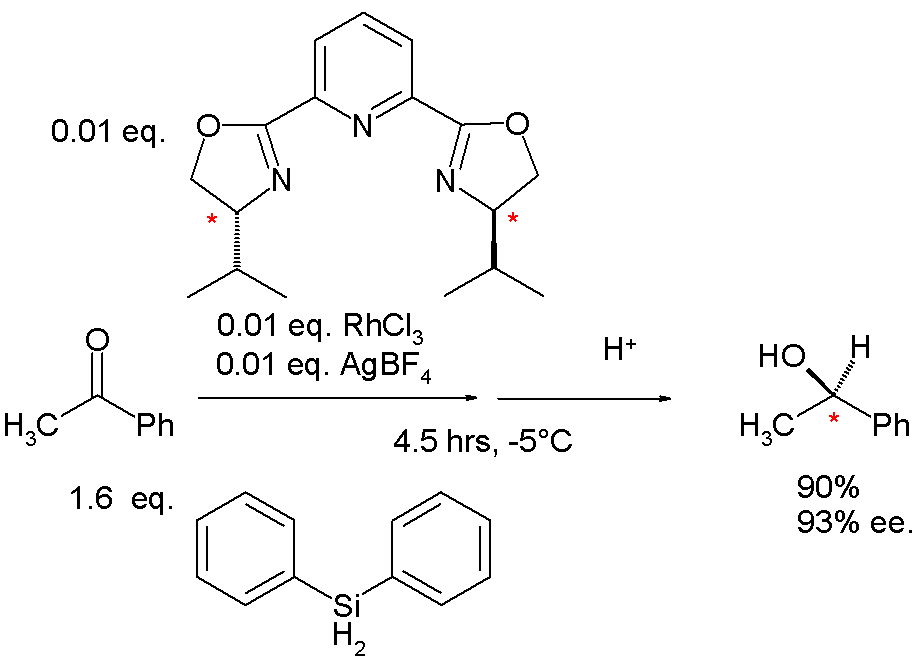
Nishiyama 1989: Enantioselective hydrosilylation

== History ==
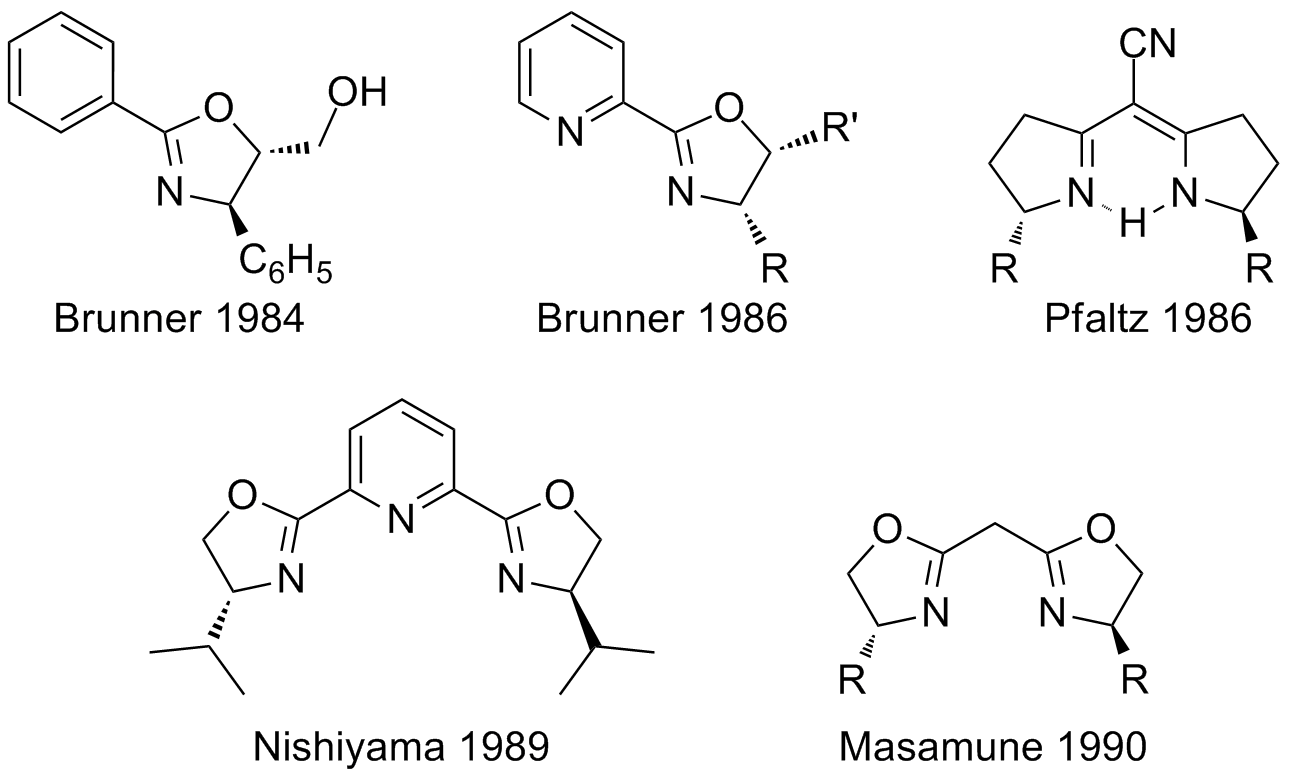
Oxazoline-related ligands of historical interest

Oxazoline ligands were first used for asymmetric catalysis in 1984 when Brunner et al. showed a single example, along with a number of Schiff bases, as being effective for enantioselective carbenoid cyclopropanation. Schiff bases were prominent ligands at the time, having been used by Ryōji Noyori during the discovery of asymmetric catalysis in 1968 (for which he and William S. Knowles would later be awarded the Nobel Prize in Chemistry). Brunner's work was influenced by that of Tadatoshi Aratani, who had worked with Noyori, before publishing a number of papers on enantioselective cyclopropanation using Schiff bases.

In this first usage the oxazoline ligand performed poorly, giving an ee of 4.9% compared to 65.6% from one of the Schiff base ligands. However Brunner reinvestigated oxazoline ligands during research into the monophenylation of diols, leading to the development of chiral pyridine oxazoline ligands, which achieved ee's of 30.2% in 1986 and 45% in 1989. In the same year Andreas Pfaltz et al. reported the use of C_{2}‑symmetric semicorrin ligands for enantioselective carbenoid cyclopropanations, achieving impressive results with ee's of between 92-97%. Reference was made to both Brunner's and Aratani's work, however the design of the ligands was also largely based on his earlier work with various macrocycles. A disadvantage of these ligands however, was that they required a multi-step synthesis with a low overall yield of approximately 30%.

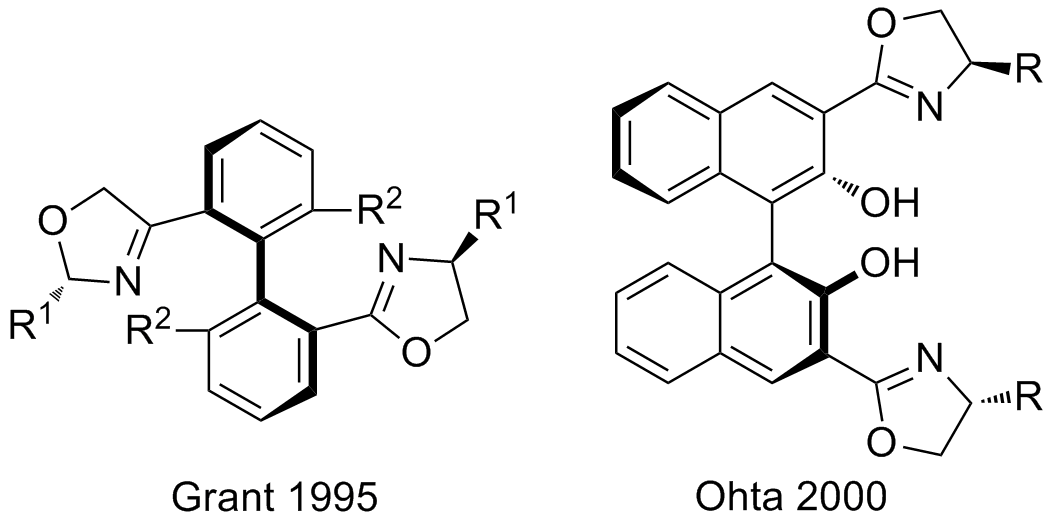
C_{2}-symmetric bis(oxazoline) ligands with axial chirality

Brunner's work led to the development of very first bisoxazolines by Nishiyama et al., who synthesised the first PyBox ligands in 1989. These ligands were used in the hydrosilylation of ketones; achieving ee's of up to 93% The first BOX ligands were reported a year later by Masamune et al. and were first used in copper catalysed carbenoid cyclopropanation reactions; achieving ee's of up to 99% with 1% molar loadings. This was a remarkable result for the time and generated significant interest in the BOX motif. As the synthesis of 2-oxazoline rings was already well established at this time (literature reviews in 1949 and 1971), research proceeded quickly, with papers from new groups being published within a year. and review articles being published by 1996. Today a considerable number of bis(oxazoline) ligands exist; structurally these are still largely based around the classic BOX and PyBOX motifs, however they also include a number of alternative structures, such as axially chiral compounds.

== See also ==
- Phosphinooxazolines (PHOX)
- Trisoxazolines (TRISOX)
