= Elisabethatriene =

Names
- Preferred IUPAC name (1R,4S,4aR)-4-Methyl-1-[(2S)-6-methylhept-5-en-2-yl]-7-methylidene-1,2,3,4,4a,5,6,7-octahydronapthalene

Identifiers
CAS Number	334499-19-3
3D model (JSmol)	Interactive image
ChemSpider	8140918
PubChem CID	9965325
CompTox Dashboard (EPA)	DTXSID001337115
- InChI: InChI=1S/C20H32/c1-14(2)7-6-8-16(4)19-12-10-17(5)18-11-9-15(3)13-20(18)19/h7,13,16-19H,3,6,8-12H2,1-2,4-5H3/t16-,17-,18+,19+/m0/s1 Key: DTMNMDQQDKQKIE-INDMIFKZSA-N
- SMILES: CC1CCC(C2=CC(=C)CCC12)C(C)CCC=C(C)C

Properties
Chemical formula	C_{20}H_{32}
Molar mass	272.476 g·mol^{−1}
- Except where otherwise noted, data are given for materials in their standard state (at 25 °C [77 °F], 100 kPa). Infobox references

Elisabethatriene is a bicyclic compound found in the marine octocoral Pseudopterogorgia elisabethae. It is proposed to act as an intermediate in the synthesis of pseudopterosin or dehydrogenates into erogorgiaene. It is the product of catalysis of geranylgeranyl diphosphate using the Elisabethatriene synthase enzyme. Its stereochemistry is identical to the stereochemistry of elisabethatrienol.
