= C20H30 =

The molecular formula C_{20}H_{30} may refer to:

- Abietatriene
- Erogorgiaene
