= Andreas Pfaltz =

Swiss chemist (born 1948) known for his work in the area of catalysis

- Born: 10 May 1948 (age 78); Basel, Switzerland
- Education: ETH Zurich
- Known for: chiral ligands, coordination chemistry and catalysis
- Awards: Pracejus Prize (2003); Prelog Medal (2003); Ryoji Noyori Prize (2008); Chirality Medal (2016)
- Scientific career
- Fields: Chemistry
- Workplaces: University of Basel; Max Planck Institute for Coal Research; ETH Zurich
- Thesis: (1978)
- Doctoral advisor: Albert Eschenmoser
- Website: chemie.unibas.ch/en/persons/andreas-pfaltz/

Andreas Pfaltz (born 10 May 1948) is a Swiss chemist known for his work in the area of coordination chemistry and catalysis.

== Education and professional life ==
Andreas Pfaltz studied at ETH Zurich, completing his undergraduate diploma in natural sciences in 1972 and his PhD in organic chemistry in 1978. His doctoral supervisor was Albert Eschenmoser, whose research into vitamin B_{12} and other corrin rings would influence Pfaltz's early research. Following a two-year postdoctoral position at Columbia University (early 1978 – late 1979), working for Gilbert Stork on the synthesis of Rifamycin, he returned to ETH Zurich as a lecturer and began his own research. In 1990 he was appointed as an associate professor at the University of Basel, becoming a full professor in 1993. Between 1995 and 1998 he was a director of the prestigious Max Planck Institute for Coal Research, afterwards returning to the University of Basel, where he has remained till the present day.

== Research ==
Pfaltz's early research was influenced by his PhD supervisor Albert Eschenmoser and was largely based around the synthesis of corrins, porphyrins and other macrocycles. During the second half of the 1980s he began to use fragments of these macrocycles as novel ligands for asymmetric catalysis, with chiral C_{2}-symmetric semicorrins being the most successful example. Following the development of structurally related bis(oxazoline)s Pfaltz began using and developing various oxazoline based ligands, making significant contributions to the known chemistry of phosphinooxazolines. His current research activities remain focused on ligand development, asymmetric catalysis and catalyst screening.

== Professional appointments ==
- Scientific staff member, ETH Zürich, 1980–1986
- Privatdozent (lecturer), ETH Zürich, 1987–1990
- Associate professor, University of Basel, 1990–1993
- Professor of organic chemistry, University of Basel, 1993–1995
- Head of the Homogeneous Catalysis Section, Max Planck Institute for Coal Research, 1995–1998
- Professor of chemistry, University of Basel, 1999–2015
- Professor emeritus, University of Basel, 2015–present

== Awards ==
- Werner Prize of the Swiss Chemical Society, 1989
- Wilhelm Manchot Research Professorship, Technical University of Munich, 2002
- Horst-Pracejus-Prize of the German Chemical Society, 2003
- Prelog Medal of the ETH Zurich, 2003
- Ryoji Noyori Prize, The Society of Synthetic Organic Chemistry, Japan, 2008
- Heilbronner-Hückel Lecturer, Swiss Chemical Society and German Chemical Society, 2011
- Member of The German Academy of Sciences "Leopoldina", 2011
- Yamada-Koga Prize, Japan Research Foundation of Optically Active Compounds, 2011
- President of the Bürgenstock conference, 2012
- Chirality Medal, (2016)
