= Bipinnatin J =

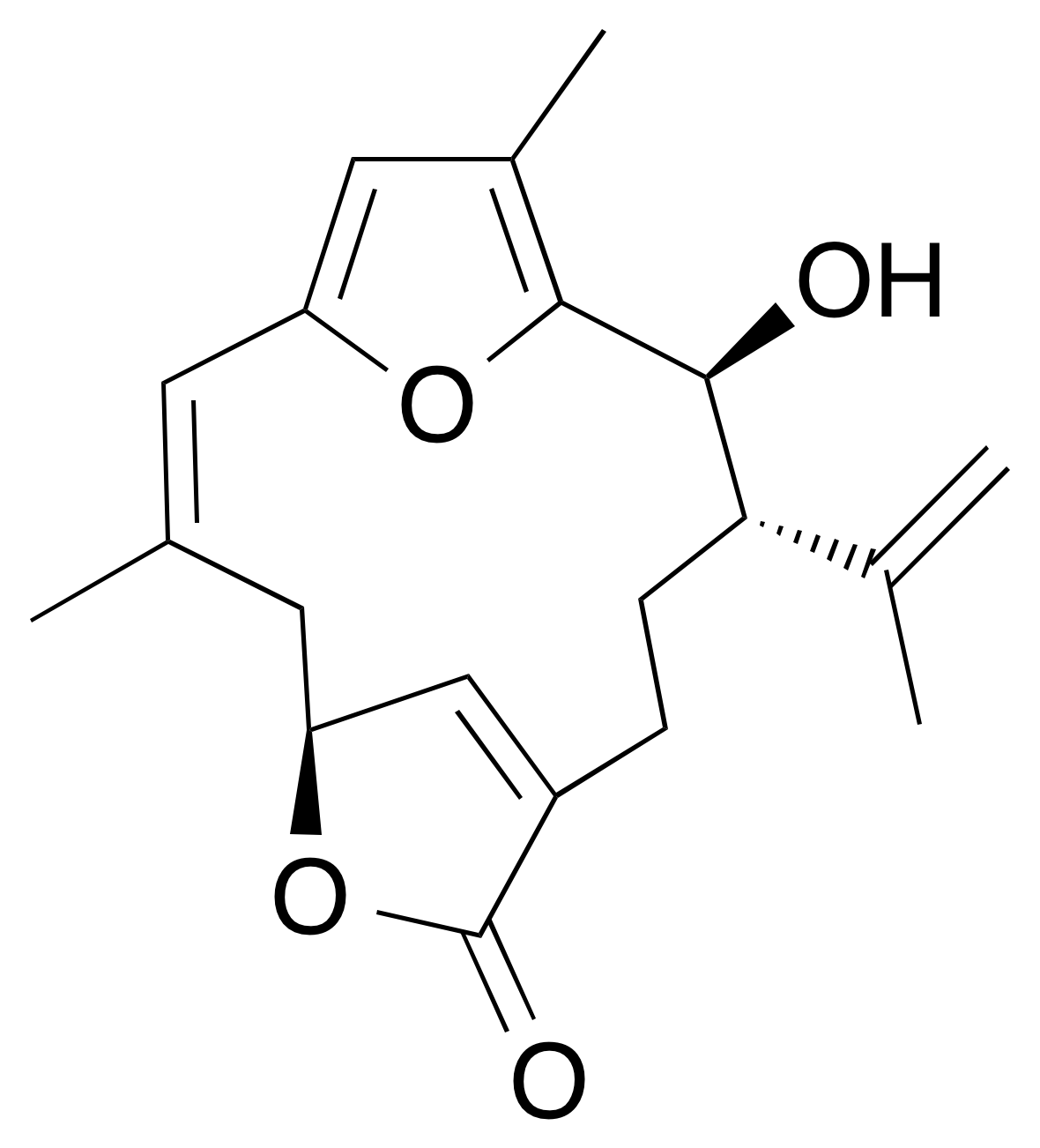

Names
- IUPAC name (2Z,5S,11S,12S)-12-Hydroxy-11-isopropenyl-3,14-dimethyl-6,16-dioxatricyclo[11.2.1.15,8]heptadeca-1(15),2,8(17),13-tetraen-7-one

Identifiers
CAS Number	201742-79-2
3D model (JSmol)	Interactive image
ChEMBL	ChEMBL401906
ChemSpider	10213404
PubChem CID	5470115
CompTox Dashboard (EPA)	DTXSID001030379
- InChI: InChI=1S/C20H24O4/c1-11(2)17-6-5-14-10-16(24-20(14)22)8-12(3)7-15-9-13(4)19(23-15)18(17)21/h7,9-10,16-18,21H,1,5-6,8H2,2-4H3/b12-7-/t16-,17-,18-/m0/s1 Key: RCFMTOJVVOOMTO-PVUOXGCVSA-N
- SMILES: Cc1cc/2oc1[C@H]([C@@H](CCC3=C[C@H](C/C(=C2)/C)OC3=O)C(=C)C)O

Properties
Chemical formula	C_{20}H_{24}O_{4}
Molar mass	328.40216
Melting point	140 to 142 °C (284 to 288 °F; 413 to 415 K)
- Except where otherwise noted, data are given for materials in their standard state (at 25 °C [77 °F], 100 kPa). Infobox references

Bipinnatin J is a diterpene isolated from the bipinnate sea plume Antillogorgia bipinnata, a sea fan found in the eastern Caribbean Sea. It is one of the structurally simplest of the furanocembrenolides, and is speculated to be a biosynthetic precursor to a wide array cembrenolides along with the dehydroxylated analog, rubifolide.

== Biosynthesis ==
Although the exact biosynthesis of bipinnatin J has not been formally studied, the biosynthesis the core cembrane skeleton, neo-cembrene, has been extensively studied. Starting from geranylgeranyl pyrophosphate, the pyrophosphate leaves, creating the allyl carbocation. A type A cyclization then yields the 14-membered cembrane ring with the isopropyl cation outside the ring. Proton elimination then yields neo-cembrene. From this point, the biosynthesis of bipinnatin J is speculative. Oxidation, most likely utilizing P450 monooxygenases, followed by ring closure creates both the furan and butenolide within the 14-membered ring. ∆ double bond isomerization of the C7-C8 olefin then occurs to afford the Z conformation, yielding rubifolide. Another oxidation of C2 then yields bipinnatin J.

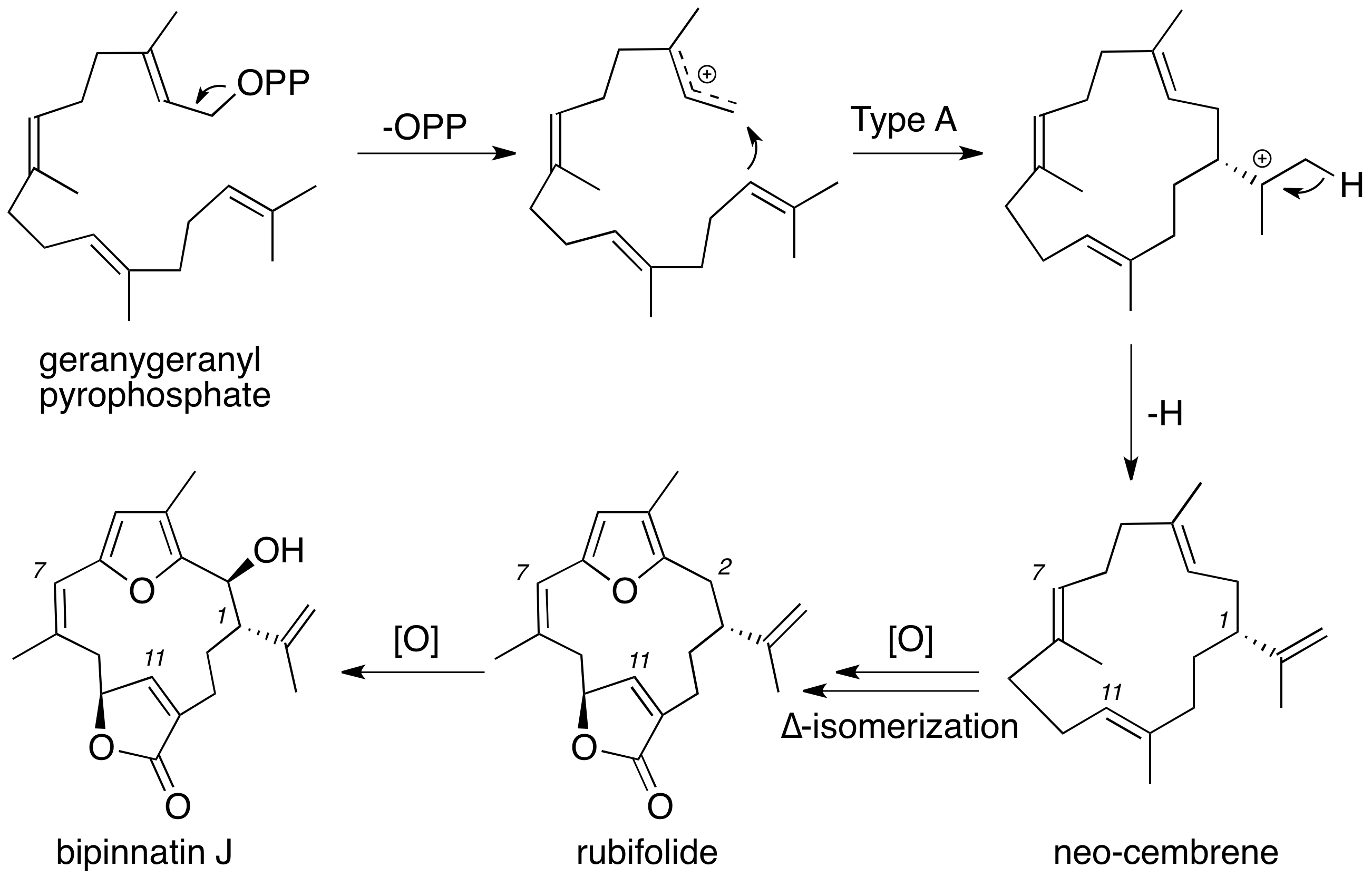
Proposed biosynthesis of bipinnatin J
