= Elisabethatriene synthase =

Identifiers
- EC no.: 4.2.3.41
- CAS no.: 334022-59-2

Databases
- IntEnz: IntEnz view
- BRENDA: BRENDA entry
- ExPASy: NiceZyme view
- KEGG: KEGG entry
- MetaCyc: metabolic pathway
- PRIAM: profile
- PDB structures: RCSB PDB PDBe PDBsum
Search
- PMC: articles
- PubMed: articles
- NCBI: proteins

Elisabethatriene synthase (EC 4.2.3.41, elisabethatriene cyclase) is an enzyme with systematic name geranylgeranyl-diphosphate diphosphate-lyase (elisabethatriene-forming). This enzyme catalyses the following chemical reaction

geranylgeranyl diphosphate $\rightleftharpoons$ elisabethatriene + diphosphate

This enzyme requires Mg^{2+} or less efficiently Mn^{2+}.
