= Transition metal phosphate complex =

Coordination complexes with one or more phosphate ligands

Some bonding modes in phosphate complexes.

Transition metal phosphate complexes are coordination complexes with one or more phosphate ligands. Phosphate binds to metals through one, two, three, or all four oxygen atoms. The bidentate coordination mode is common. The second and third pK_{a}'s of phosphoric acid, pK_{a2} and pK_{a3}, are 7.2 and 12.37, respectively. It follows that HPO^{2−}_{4} and PO^{3−}_{4} are sufficiently basic to serve as ligands. The examples below confirm this expectation. The behavior of metal phosphate complexes is related to the mechanisms of metal-catalyzed reactions of phosphate esters and pyrophosphates.

== Examples ==
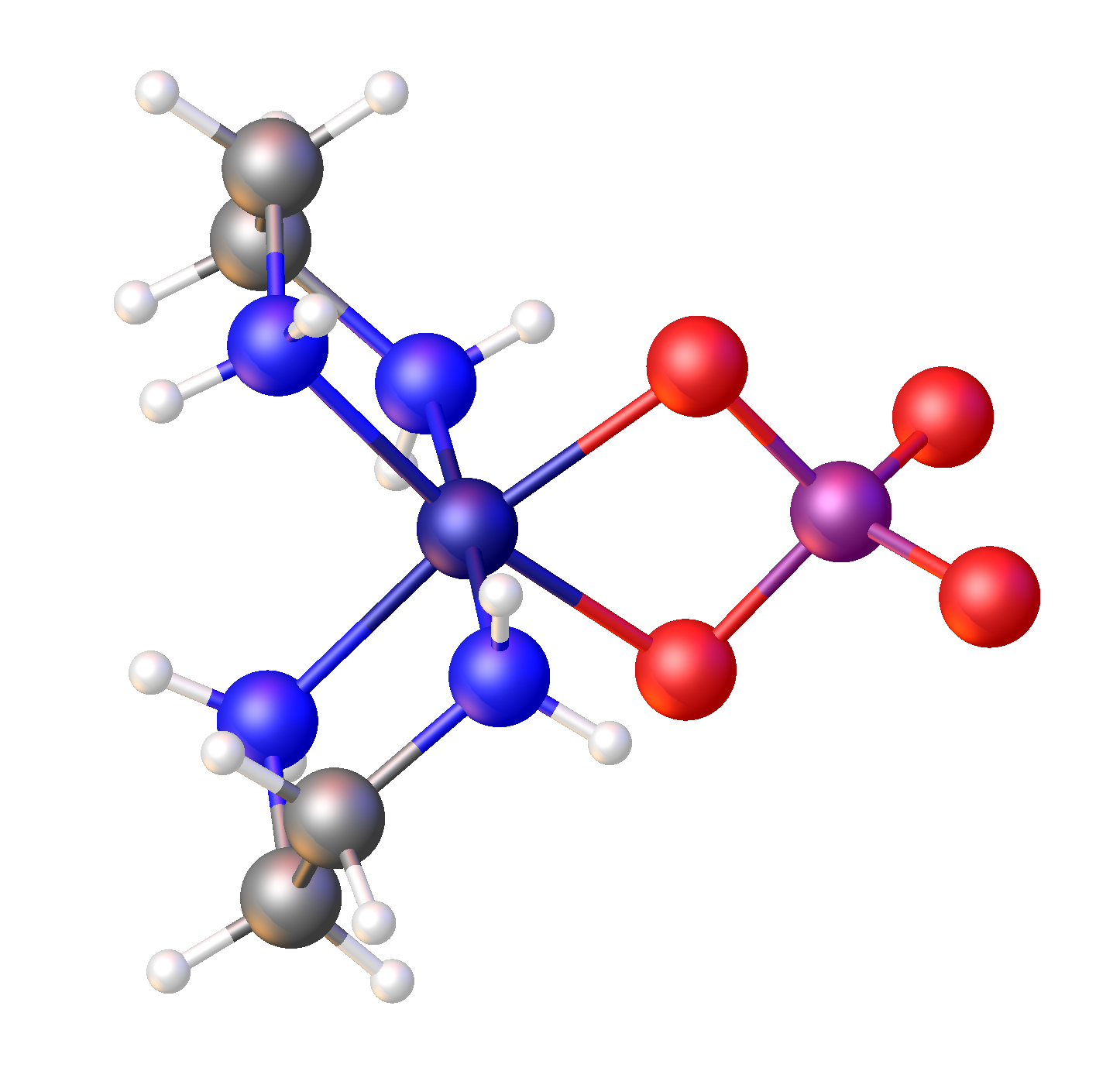
Co(H_{2}NCH_{2}CH_{2}NH_{2})_{2}PO_{4}

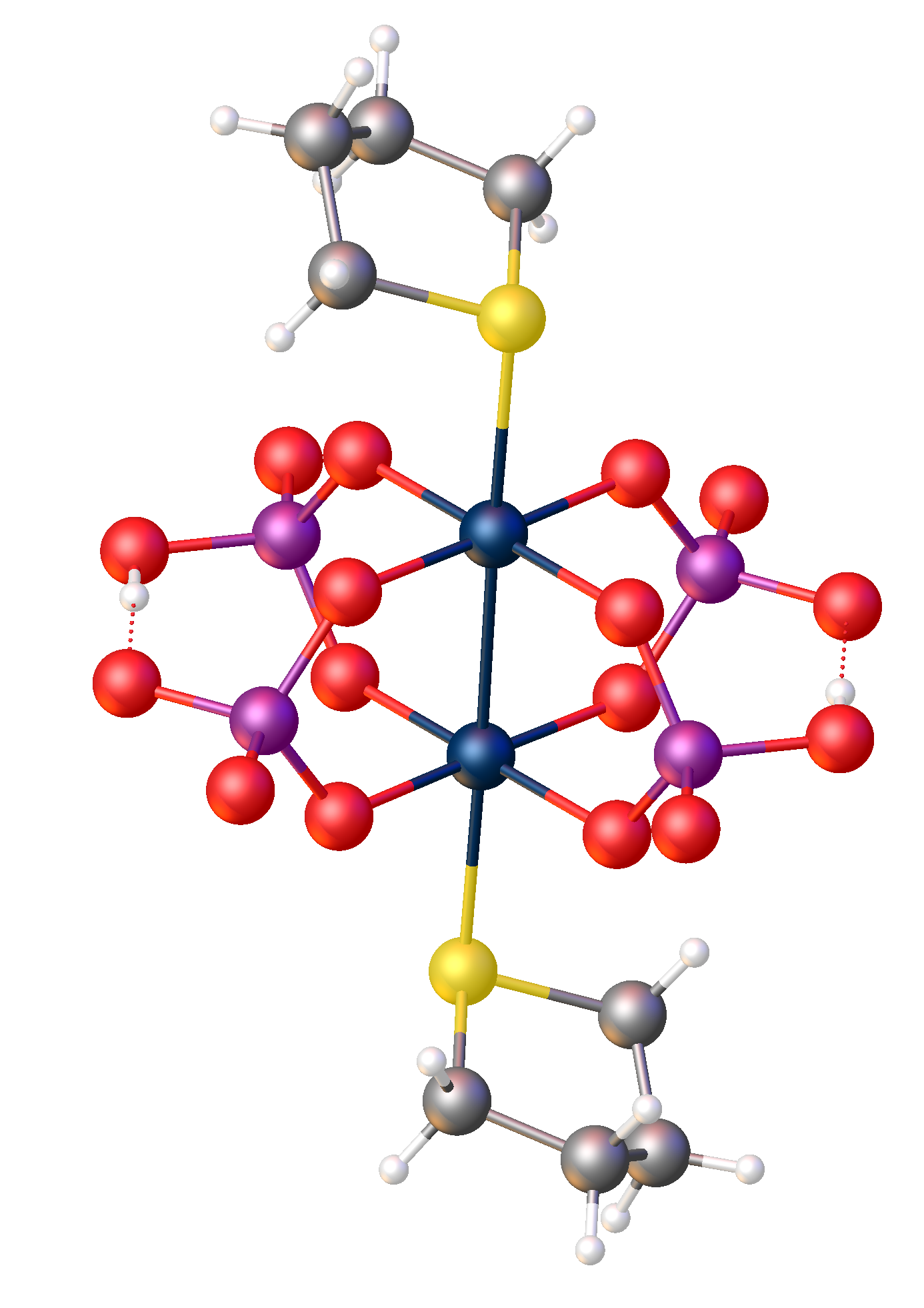
[Pt_{2}(HPO_{4})_{4}(SC_{4}H_{8})_{2}]^{2−}

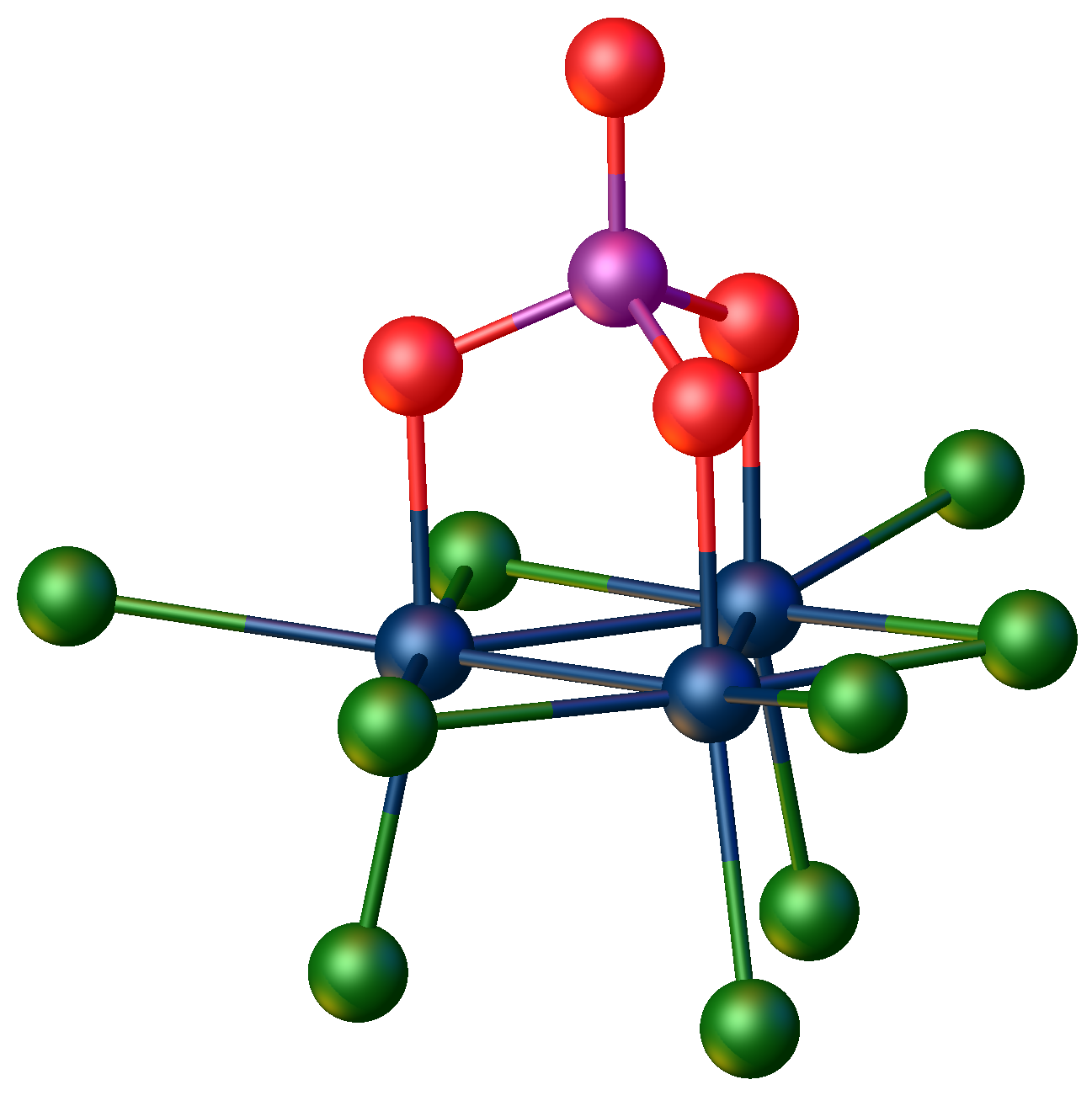
[Re_{3}Cl_{9}(PO_{4})]^{3−}

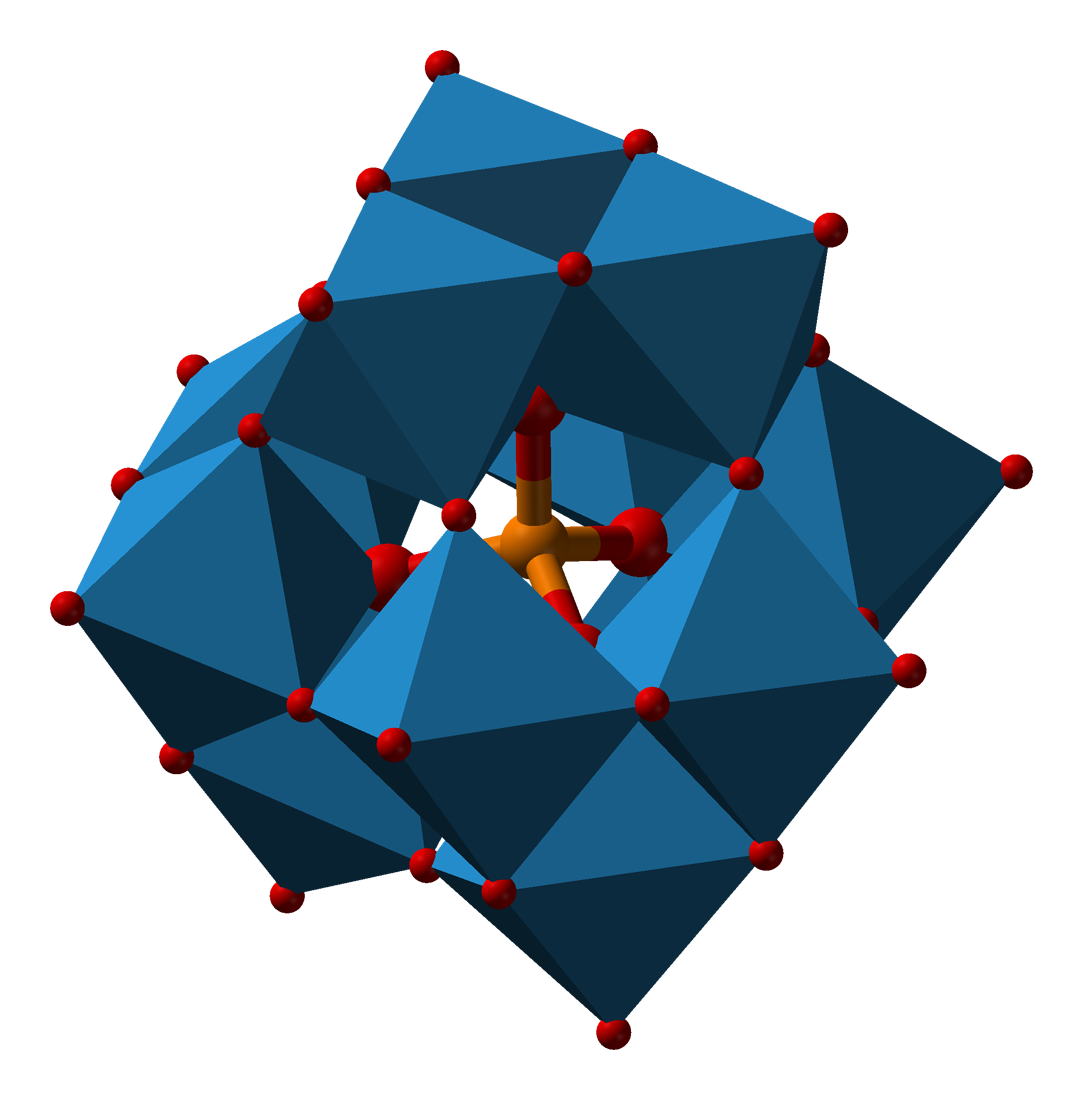
Phosphotungstic acid H_{3}PW_{12}O_{40}
- Bidentate, chelating: One example is [Co(ethylenediamine)_{2}(PO_{4})].
- Bis-Bidentate: {[Co([tetraamine)]_{2}(PO_{_{4}})}^{3+} (tetraamine = N(CH_{2}CH_{2}CH_{2}NH_{2})_{3})
- Bidentate, bridging: Phosphate, like carboxylate and sulfate, is well suited to span metal-metal bonds. This bonding mode is illustrated by [Mo_{2}(HPO_{4})_{4}]^{4−}, which features a Mo-Mo triple bond. Related [Pt(III)]_{2} complexes have been reported.
- Tridentate, bridging. Several triangulo clusters feature a capping phosphate ligand, e.g. [Re_{3}Cl_{9}(PO_{4})]^{3−}.
- Encapsulated: In phosphotungstic acid, all four oxygen atoms of phosphate are bonded to metals.

== Other transition metal phosphates ==
Aside from molecular metal phosphate complexes, the topic of this article, many or most transition metal phosphates are nonmolecular, being coordination polymers or dense ternary or quaternary phases. Iron(III) phosphate, contemplated as a cathode material for batteries, is one example. Vanadyl phosphate (VOPO_{4}(H_{2}O)) is a commercial catalyst for oxidation reactions. Many metal phosphates occur as minerals.

== Di- and polyphosphates ==
Phosphates exist in many condensed oligomeric forms. Many of these derivatives function as ligands for metal ions. Pyrophosphate (P_{2}O^{4−}_{7}) and trimetaphosphate ([P_{3}O_{9}]^{3−}) have been particularly studied. They typically function as bi- and tridentate ligands.

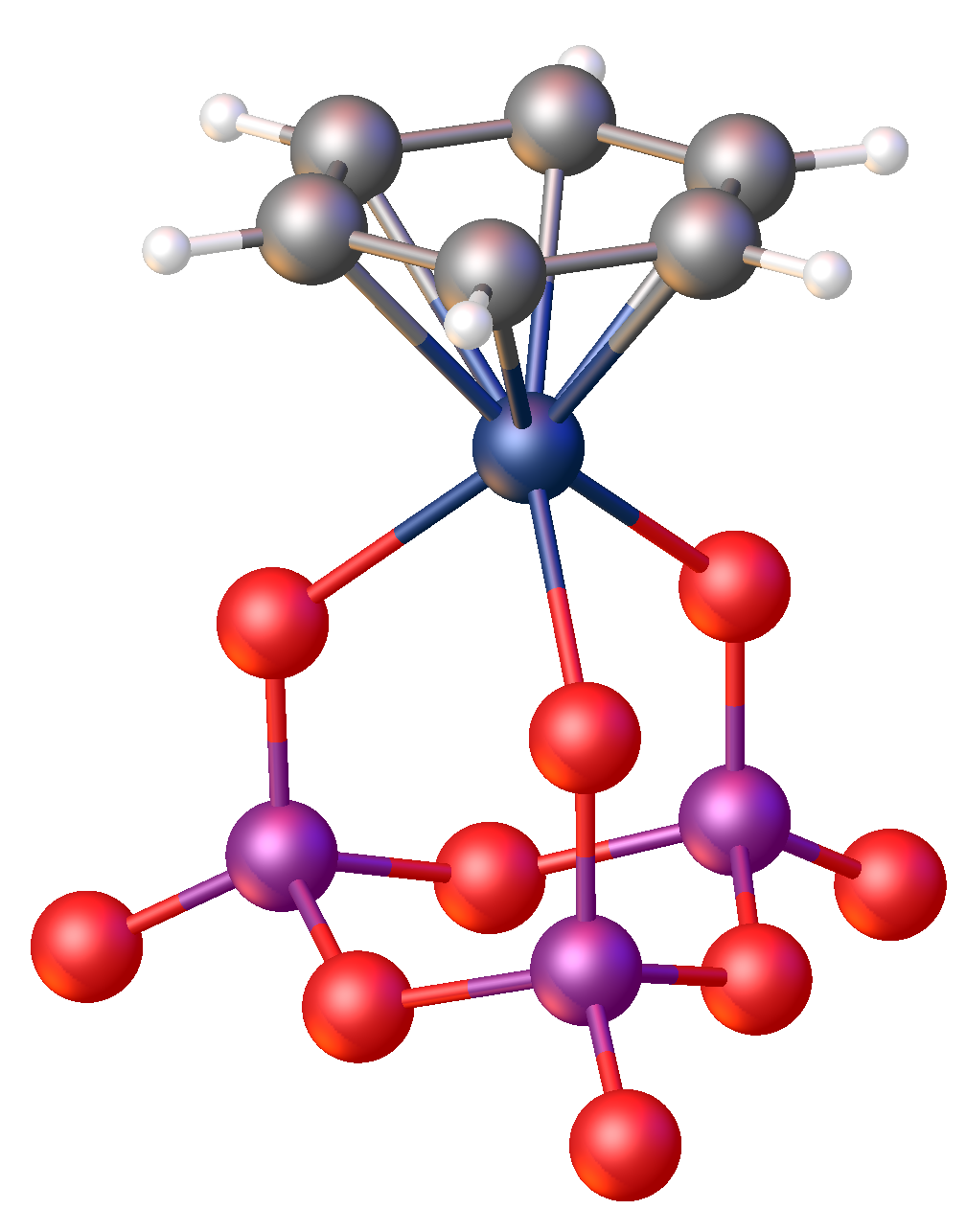
Structure of [(C_{6}H_{6})Ru(P_{3}O_{9})]^{−}. Color code: red = O, violet = P, blue = Ru, gray = C.
