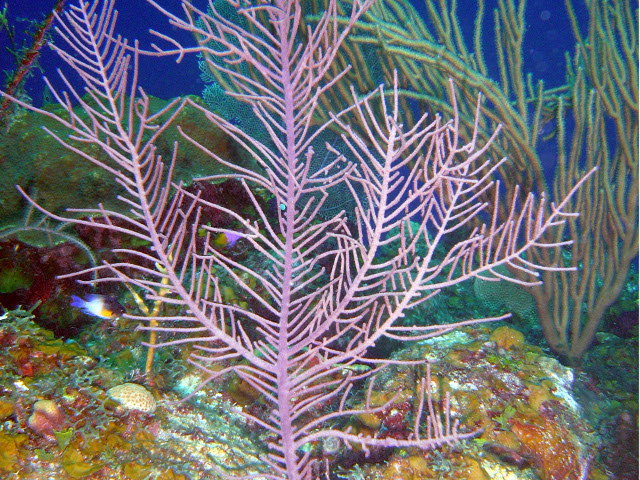
- Antillogorgia bipinnata

Scientific classification
- Kingdom: Animalia
- Phylum: Cnidaria
- Subphylum: Anthozoa
- Class: Octocorallia
- Order: Malacalcyonacea
- Family: Gorgoniidae
- Genus: Antillogorgia; Bayer, 1951

Species
- See text

= Antillogorgia =

Genus of corals

Antillogorgia is a genus of soft coral, sea fans in the family Gorgoniidae.

== Species ==
The World Register of Marine Species lists the following species:

- Antillogorgia acerosa (Pallas, 1766)
- Antillogorgia albatrossae Bayer, 1961
- Antillogorgia americana (Gmelin, 1791)
- Antillogorgia bipinnata (Verrill, 1864)
- Antillogorgia blanquillensis (Stiasny, 1941)
- Antillogorgia elisabethae Bayer, 1961
- Antillogorgia hummelincki Bayer, 1961
- Antillogorgia hystrix Bayer, 1961
- Antillogorgia kallos (Bielschowsky, 1918)
- Antillogorgia navia Bayer, 1961
- Antillogorgia rigida (Bielschowsky, 1929)
