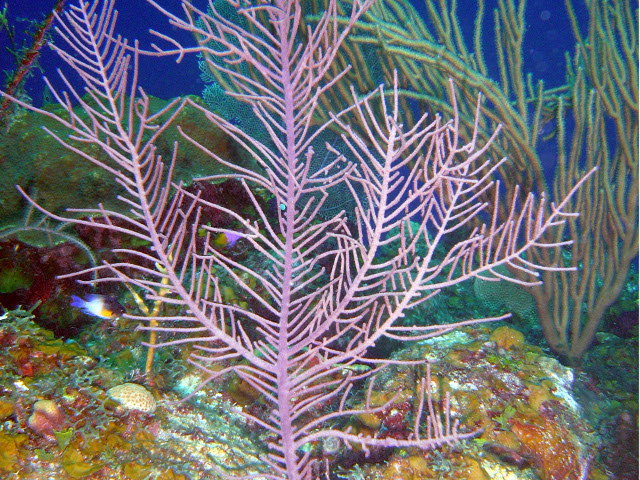

Scientific classification
- Kingdom: Animalia
- Phylum: Cnidaria
- Subphylum: Anthozoa
- Class: Octocorallia
- Order: Malacalcyonacea
- Family: Gorgoniidae
- Genus: Antillogorgia
- Species: A. bipinnata

Binomial name
- Antillogorgia bipinnata (Verrill, 1864)

Synonyms
- Pseudopterogorgia bipinnata (Verrill, 1864)

= Antillogorgia bipinnata =

Species of coral

Antillogorgia bipinnata, the bipinnate sea plume, is a species of colonial soft coral, a sea fan in the family Gorgoniidae. It is found in the Caribbean Sea. It was first described as Pseudopterogorgia bipinnata in 1864 by the American zoologist Addison Emery Verrill. Williams and Chen (2012), transferred all the Atlantic species of Pseudopterogorgia to Antillogorgia.

== Description ==
Antillogorgia bipinnata is a colonial soft coral growing in the form of a bipinnate fan usually in a single plane. It can grow to a height of about 57 cm (22 in) with a slightly smaller width. It consists of a main stem with several branches, with regularly-spaced pairs of branchlets. The branchlets are stiff, slightly flattened, and typically 25 to 40 mm (1.0 to 1.6 in) long and 1 to 1.5 mm (0.04 to 0.06 in) in diameter. They are spaced about 5 mm (0.2 in) apart and project at an angle of about 65° from the branch. The apertures from which the polyps protrude are small and slit-like and are arranged in staggered double rows on either side of the branchlets. The colour of this sea fan is usually violet or purple but may be yellow or whitish.

== Distribution and habitat ==
Antillogorgia bipinnata is found in shallow water reefs in the Bahamas, South Florida and the Caribbean Sea. It usually grows in the depth range 9 to 20 m (30 to 66 ft) but can grow as deep as 27 m (89 ft).

== Biology ==
Mature specimens of Antillogorgia bipinnata have symbiotic unicellular algae known as zooxanthellae in their tissues, but these are not present in the planula larvae and the polyp into which it metamorphosizes. Researchers reared these larvae in algae-free environments and then attempted to infect the resulting polyps with various strains of dinoflagellate. Some of these were observed to be attracted to the polyps and actively swam into their open mouths; successful infection was achieved with some strains of dinoflagellate and not with others.

== Secondary metabolites ==
Several secondary metabolites have been isolated from Antillogorgia bipinnata including the cytotoxic cembranoids denoted bipinnatin A to D, and the diterpene bipinnatin J.
