= Antillogorgia elisabethae =

Scientific classification
- Kingdom: Animalia
- Phylum: Cnidaria
- Subphylum: Anthozoa
- Class: Octocorallia
- Order: Alcyonacea
- Family: Gorgoniidae
- Genus: Antillogorgia
- Species: A. elisabethae

Binomial name
- Antillogorgia elisabethae Bayer, 1961

Synonyms
- Pseudopterogorgia elisabethae Bayer, 1961

Species of coral

Antillogorgia elisabethae is a species of soft coral found in the Caribbean Sea in the shape of a sea plume (also called a sea whip). It resides from depths of 25 metres (82 ft) to 30 metres (98 ft), often at reef drop-offs. It looks like a plume of feathery appendages with radial symmetry. The branches of A. elisabethae are pinnate and distichous, and will orient themselves in the direction of the ocean current. It ranges in size from 0.3 metres (0.98 ft) to 2 metres (6.6 ft). It is considered commercially important as it is harvested for analgesics and cosmetic creams. The compound that is believed to cause its beneficial effects is Pseudopterosin A, a diterpene glycoside, a selective analgesic. A. elisabethae is also used in fish tanks as a part of the commercial pet industry. The species has a Least Concern conservation status.

== Reproduction ==
The female exposes her eggs to the water current by placing them on her reproductive polyps. Sperm will eventually come into contact with the eggs, and the fertilized egg will develop into a planula in 1–2 days. The larvae form a colony on the parent for two to four days and then will become free-swimming. The free-swimming larvae are ciliated and bilaterally symmetric. Once the larvae become free-swimming, they will usually settle near the parent organism, as they are negatively buoyant and will sink to the ocean floor, where they grow into adults and continue the cycle. Its mating system is thus polygynandrous. The peak reproductive times for A. elisabethae are between November and January.
