= Pseudopterosin A =

Names
- IUPAC name (3S,7R,9S,9aR)-5-Hydroxy-3,6,9-trimethyl-7-(2-methylprop-1-en-1-yl)-2,3,7,8,9,9a-hexahydro-1H-phenalen-4-yl β-D-xylopyranoside
- Systematic IUPAC name (2S,3R,4S,5R)-2-{[(3S,7R,9S,9aR)-5-Hydroxy-3,6,9-trimethyl-7-(2-methylprop-1-en-1-yl)-2,3,7,8,9,9a-hexahydro-1H-phenalen-4-yl]oxy}oxane-3,4,5-triol

Identifiers
| CAS Number | 104855-20-1 |
| 3D model (JSmol) | Interactive image |
| ChEMBL | ChEMBL476886 |
| ChemSpider | 9907496 |
| PubChem CID | 11732783 |
| UNII | 5P6979KNB7 |
| CompTox Dashboard (EPA) | DTXSID301030380 |
- InChI: InChI=1S/C25H36O6/c1-11(2)8-15-9-13(4)16-7-6-12(3)18-20(16)19(15)14(5)21(27)24(18)31-25-23(29)22(28)17(26)10-30-25/h8,12-13,15-17,22-23,25-29H,6-7,9-10H2,1-5H3/t12-,13-,15-,16+,17+,22-,23+,25-/m0/s1 Key: DBGVVIGAVAIWRU-GYGPFBJXSA-N
- SMILES: O[C@H]4[C@H](Oc1c3c2c(c(c1O)C)[C@@H](\C=C(/C)C)C[C@H](C)[C@H]2CC[C@@H]3C)OC[C@@H](O)[C@@H]4O

Properties
| Chemical formula | C_{25}H_{36}O_{6} |
| Molar mass | 432.557 g·mol^{−1} |
- Except where otherwise noted, data are given for materials in their standard state (at 25 °C [77 °F], 100 kPa). Infobox references

Pseudopterosin A is a diterpene glycoside isolated from the gorgonian sea whip Antillogorgia elisabethae, found in the Bahamas and Florida Keys. Pseudopterosins A-D, which differ in the degree of acetylation at the sugar ring, were first isolated and reported in 1986. There are at least 25 unique diterpenes isolated from this species of marine animal. Samples of P. elisabethae from the Bahamas are found to have higher concentrations of pseudopterosins than populations from the Florida Keys, which have a greater diversity in diterpene structures.

== Uses ==
Pseudopterosins have anti-inflammatory and analgesic activity, with a mechanism of action different from the common non-steroidal anti-inflammatory drugs, NSAIDs. Commercially, pseudopterosins are found in skin creams as topical anti-inflammatory agents.

== Biosynthesis ==
Elisabethatriene (2) has been identified as a key intermediate for the synthesis of the class of pseudopterosins and seco-pseudopterosins. A proposed mechanistic pathway for the synthesis of elisabethatriene from geranylgeranyl pyrophosphate (GGPP, 1), is described below. Elisabethatriene synthase, a diterpene cyclase enzyme, catalyzes the transformation of the diterpene GGPP to a 10-membered carbon skeleton followed by hydride migration towards the bicyclic ring system. This cyclase enzyme has been identified as a key enzyme in forming the carbon skeleton of pseudopterosins in one step. An alternative mechanism has been proposed in which a six-membered ring is formed first, then a second ring closing for the bicyclic system.

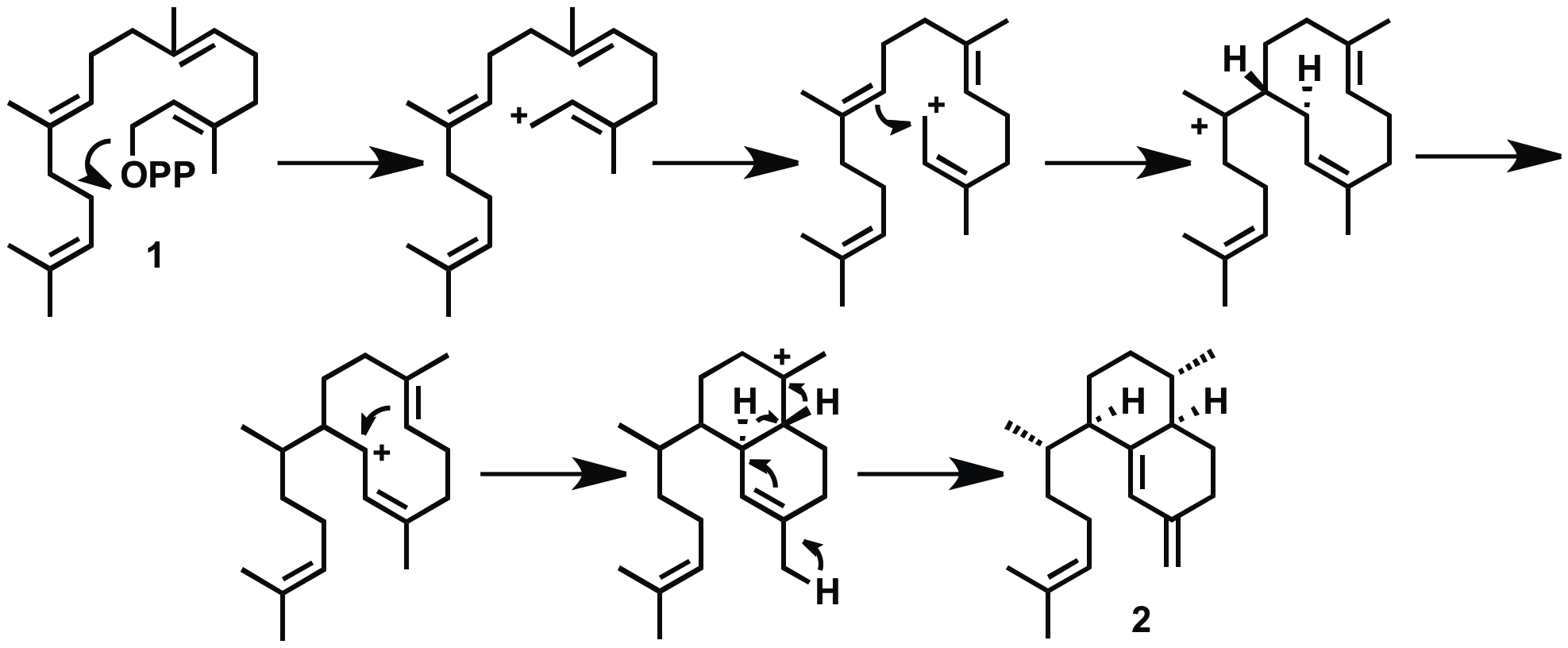
GPP cyclization to elisabethatriene

The biosynthesis of the pseudopterosins continues with an aromatization to erogorgiaene (3), two oxidations to a dihyroxyerogorgiaene (4, then 5), and another oxidation to an ortho-hydroxyquinone (6). Ring closure (7), re-aromatization to (8) and glycosylation yield Pseudopterosin A (9). This is a plausible biosynthetic pathway, and intermediates 2, 3, 6, 7, and 8 have been identified using radio labeling studies. An alternative mechanism has been proposed with no hydroxyquinone intermediate (6). Rather, molecule 3 undergoes two subsequent oxidations at C-6 and C-7 to a structure resembling 8, then glycosylation to pseudopterosin.

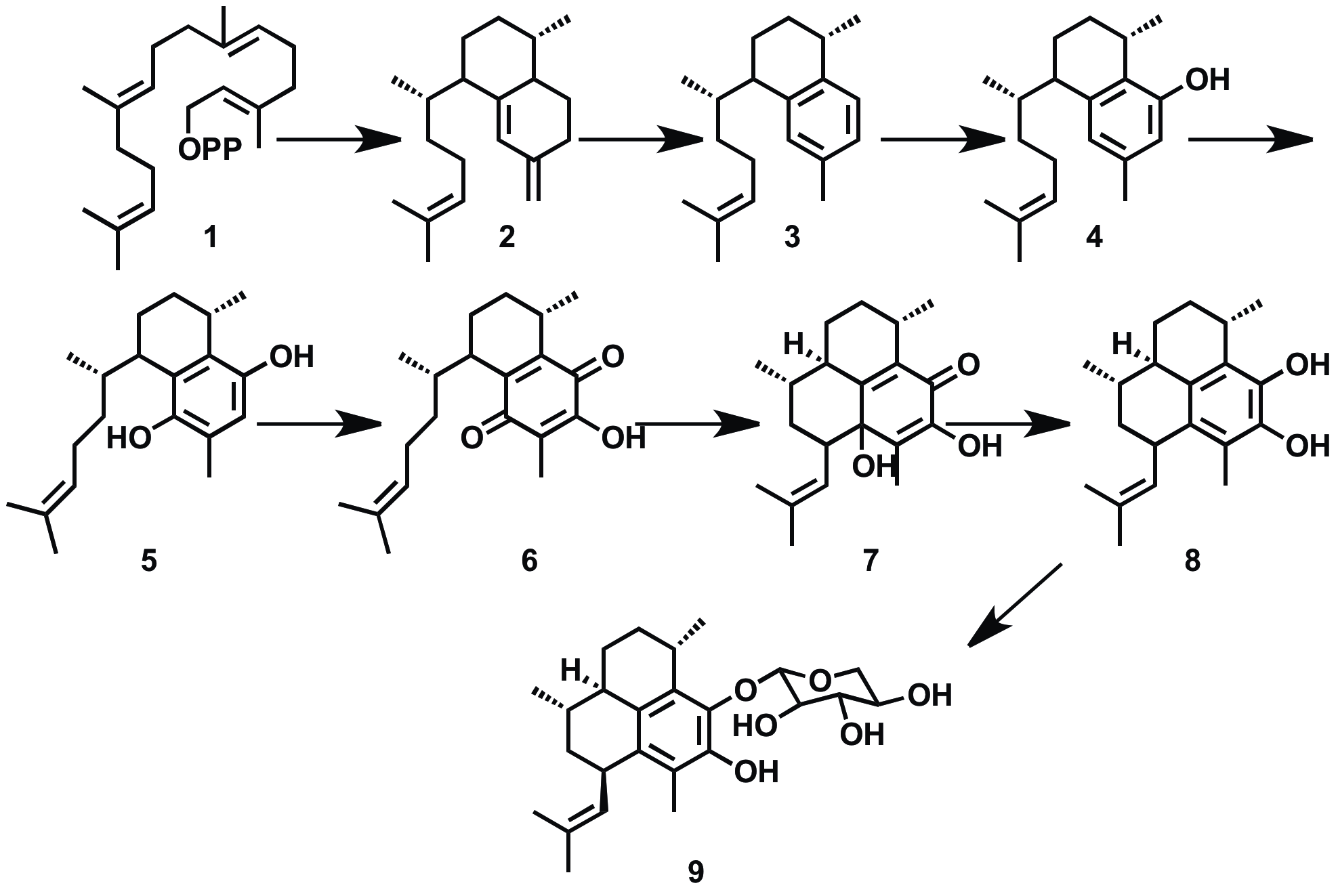
Overall biosynthetic scheme for pseudopterosin A

The branching point for the biosynthesis of the tricyclic pseudopterosins versus the bicyclic seco-pseudopterosins occurs at compound 11, the aromatized bicycle erogorgiaene. 11 is oxidized once then hydroxylated followed by glycosylation to make the bicyclic seco-pseudopterosins.

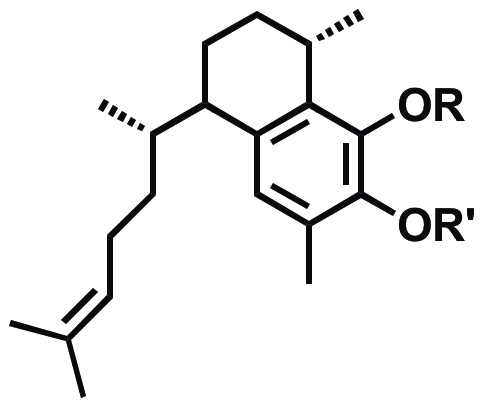
General structure of seco-pseudopterosins

The proposed synthesis of artificial anti-inflammatory metabolites is modeled after pseudopterosins and is based on the bicyclic seco-pseudopterosin structure 6.
