= Ferdinand Bohlmann =

German chemist (1921-1991)

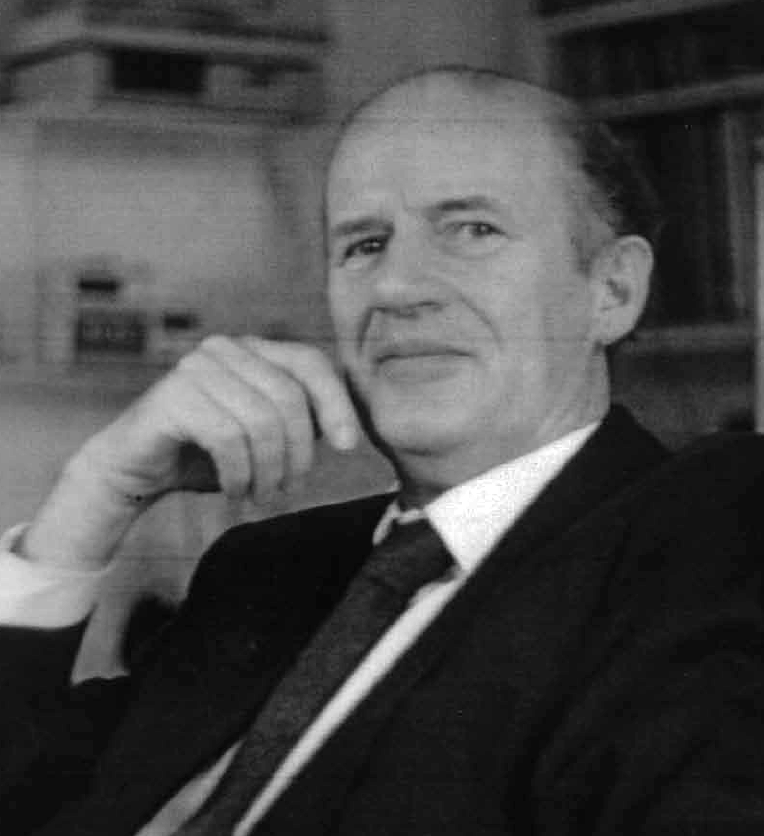
- Born: 28 August 1921; Oldenburg, Lower Saxony, Germany
- Died: 23 September 1991 (aged 70)
- Scientific career
- Fields: Chemistry

Ferdinand Bohlmann (27 August 1921 – 23 September 1991) was a German chemist, known for his studies of plant natural products chemistry, especially terpenoids and polyynes.

== Life ==
Bohlmann studied chemistry in Göttingen from 1939 to 1944. His studies were interrupted by military service and injury. In 1946, he received his doctorate under Hans Brockmann (1903–1988) on chromatography of pyridine compounds. He then worked under Hans Herloff Inhoffen at the University of Marburg. Bohlmann followed Inhoffen to the TH Braunschweig and completed his habilitation there. Bohlmann became a lecturer in 1952 and an adjunct professor in 1957. In 1959, he succeeded Friedrich Weygand at the TU Berlin (1911–1969) at the Institute for Organic Chemistry, where he led a rapidly expanding working group. His most famous academic student is Helmut Schwarz.

Bohlmann died on 23 September 1991.

== Work ==
Bohlmann's main area of work was natural product chemistry, especially terpenes and polyynes. These were mainly isolated from plants of the Asteraceae family, (formerly Compositae), and their structure was elucidated. Bohlmann also worked on the characterization of quinolizidine alkaloids. Bohlmann's list of publications includes around 1300 publications. His collaboration with the biodiversity informatics working group at the Berlin Botanical Garden resulted in a system with which the chemical substances of the Compositae were made accessible in a database, the "Bohlmann Files". The Bohlmann-Rahtz pyridine synthesis is named after Bohlmann and Dieter Rahtz.

== Honors ==
In 1954, he received the lecturer prize of the Fonds der Chemischen Industrie. In 1958, he was awarded the Göttingen Academy Prize. The Bohlmann Lecture series was established in his honor in 1989 at the Institute for Chemistry at the TU Berlin. From 2004 to 2018 this event was funded by the Schering Foundation. Since 2019 the event has been carried out in cooperation with Bayer AG.

Bohlmann lecture
| Guest | Year | Title of talk | Institution | Country |
|---|---|---|---|---|
| Albert Eschenmoser | 1989 | Why not hexose nucleic acids? | ETH Zürich | Switzerland |
| Meinhart H. Zenk | 1990 | Why do plants have to be virtuoso chemists? | LMU Munich | Germany |
| Elias James Corey | 1991 | New Developments in the Field of Steroids | Harvard University | United States |
| Duilio Arigoni | 1992 | Synthesis and detection of chiral t-butyl groups | ETH Zürich | Switzerland |
| Kyriacos Costa Nicolaou | 1993 | Chemistry and Biology of the Enediyne Anticancer Antibiotics | UCSD | United States |
| Koji Nakanishi | 1994 | Lessons from Nature | Columbia University | United States |
| Jean-Marie Lehn | 1995 | Supramolecular Chemistry : Concepts and Recipes | Collège de France | France |
| Ekkehard Winterfeldt | 1996 | Natural product synthesis : experimental challenge, intellectual game, chemical treasure trove | Leibniz Universität Hannover | Germany |
| Yoshito Kishi | 1997 | Stereochemistry Assignment by Organic Synthesis | Harvard University | United States |
| Jack E. Baldwin | 1998 | How old is Penicillin | University of Oxford | United Kingdom |
| Ryoji Noyori | 1999 | Asymmetric Catalysis: Science and Opportunities | Nagoya University | Japan |
| Dieter Seebach | 2000 | A trip into the world of β-proteins | ETH Zürich | Switzerland |
| George Whitesides | 2001 | Polyvalency in Biochemistry | Harvard University | United States |
| Samuel J. Danishefsky | 2002 | On the Awesome Power of Chemical Synthesis | Memorial Sloan-Kettering Cancer Center | United States |
| Peter B. Dervan | 2003 | Molecular Recognition of DNA by Small Molecules | California Institute of Technology | United States |
| Manfred T. Reetz | 2004 | Directed Evolution of Enantioselective Enzymes | Max-Planck-Institut für Kohlenforschung | Germany |
| Christopher T. Walsh | 2005 | Tailoring of Natural Products by Biosynthetic Halogenations | Harvard Medical School | United States |
| Robert H. Grubbs | 2006 | Olefin Metathesis: from Fundamental Science to Applications | California Institute of Technology | United States |
| Aaron Ciechanover | 2007 | The Ubiquitin System – From Bench to Bedside | Technion | Israel |
| Richard R. Schrock | 2008 | Monoalkoxide Monopyrrolide Olefin Metathesis Catalysts of Molybdenum | Massachusetts Institute of Technology | United States |
| Gerhard Ertl | 2009 | Elementary Steps in Heterogeneous Catalysis | Fritz Haber Institute of the Max Planck Society | Germany |
| Ada E. Yonath | 2010 | The amazing ribosome, its tiny enemies and hints of its origin | Weizmann Institute of Science | Israel |
| Ei-ichi Negishi | 2011 | Magical Power of Transition Metals: Past, Present, and Future | Purdue University | United States |
| David MacMillan | 2012 | New Catalysis Concepts | Princeton University | United States |
| David Milstein | 2013 | Discovery of Metal-Catalyzed Reactions for Sustainable Chemistry | Weizmann Institute of Science | Israel |
| François Diederich | 2014 | New acetylene and cumulene chemistry: from optoelectronic and chiroptical molecular materials to supramolecular systems | ETH Zürich | Netherlands |
| Phil Baran | 2015 | Studies in Natural Product Synthesis | The Scripps Research Institute | United States |
| Frances Arnold | 2016 | Innovating with Evolution: Expanding the Enzyme Universe | California Institute of Technology | United States |
| Alois Fürstner | 2017 | Catalysis for Synthesis – Concepts and Scrutiny | Max-Planck-Institut für Kohlenforschung | Germany |
| Ben L. Feringa | 2018 | The Art of Building Small − from Molecular Switches to Motors | Stratingh Institute for Chemistry | Netherlands |
| Hiroaki Suga | 2019 | Revolutionizing the discovery processes of de novo bioactive peptides and biologics | University of Tokyo | Japan |

== Bibliography ==
- Bohlmann, F., Burkhardt, T., & Zdero, C. (1973). Naturally Occurring Acetylenes. Academic Press.
- Seaman, F., Bohlmann, F., Zdero, C., & Mabry, T. J. (2012). Diterpenes of Flowering Plants: Compositae (Asteraceae). Springer Science & Business Media.
