= Hajos =

Hajos (Hungarian: Hajós) may refers to the following:

== People ==
- Alfréd Hajós (1878–1955), Hungarian athlete
- András Hajós (born 1969), Hungarian singer
- Árpád Hajós (1902–1971), Hungarian footballer
- György Hajós (1912–1972), Hungarian mathematician
- Henrik Hajós (1886–1963), Hungarian freestyle swimmer
- Karl Hajos (1889–1950), Hungarian composer
- Zoltan Hajos (1926–2022), Hungarian-American organic chemist

== Other ==
- The Hajos–Parrish–Eder–Sauer–Wiechert reaction in organic chemistry
- Hajós, a town in Bács-Kiskun county, Hungary
