= ZGH =

ZGH may refer to:

- Copenhagen Central Station, with the IATA code ZGH
- Standard Moroccan Amazigh language, which has the ISO 639 language code zgh
- Zagreb Holding, a company in Croatia
- Zarghun railway station in Pakistan, with the code ZGH
- Zindagi Gulzar Hai, Pakistani TV drama
- Zoltan Hajos, a Hungarian American organic chemist
- Zhejiang Geely Holding, a Chinese automotive group
