= Regina Palkovits =

German chemist (born 1980)

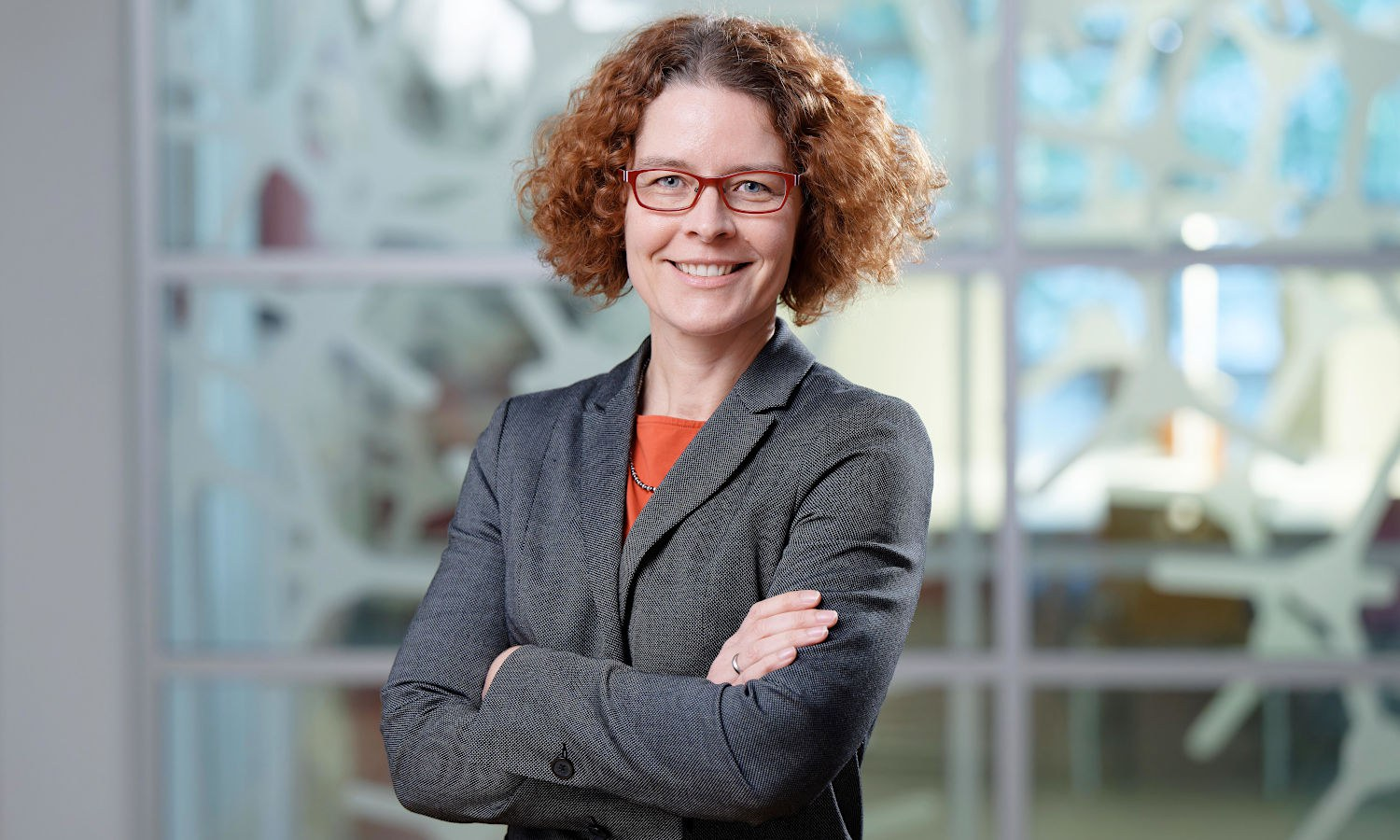
- Regina Palkovits (2024)
- Born: 1980 (age 45–46)
- Education: Technical University Dortmund; Max Planck Institute for Coal Research
- Scientific career
- Workplaces: Max Planck Institute for Coal Research; RWTH Aachen University; Forschungszentrum Jülich
- Thesis: Anwendungen von geordnetem mesoporösem Siliciumdioxid in der heterogenen Katalyse (2007)

Regina Palkovits (born 1980) is a German chemist who is a professor of chemistry at the RWTH Aachen University. Her research considers heterogenous catalysis. She was elected a Fellow of the North Rhine-Westphalian Academy of Sciences, Humanities and the Arts in 2020. In 2023 she was appointed as Director at the Institute for a Sustainable Hydrogen Economy (INW) at Forschungszentrum Jülich.

== Early life and education ==
Palkovits studied chemical engineering at the Technical University of Dortmund. She spent a year at Lehigh University as a visiting student working in chemical engineering. She joined the Max Planck Institute for Coal Research for her doctoral research, where she studied the use of mesoporous silica in heterogeneous catalysis. She joined Utrecht University as a postdoctoral scholar working in the group of Bert Weckhuysen.

== Research and career ==
In 2008, Palkovits returned to the Max Planck Institute as a group leader. She spent two years in Mülheim before joining RWTH Aachen University as a professor of chemistry. Palkovits has continued to investigate heterogeneous catalysis, looking at how to transform renewable resources into high value products. Palkovits has investigated how biomass, carbon dioxide and plastic waste can be converted into monomers for polymer synthesis and the production of carbon dioxide neutral fuels.

The focus of her research is on catalyst technologies. In the chemical storage of hydrogen, hydrogen molecules form a bond with other molecules during catalysis, which in turn creates a compound that makes it easier to store, store and transport hydrogen.

Since October 2023, she has also headed the Institute for Sustainable Hydrogen Economy at Forschungszentrum Jülich. This institute is part of the Helmholtz Hydrogen Cluster (HC-H2), which deals with the development and demonstration of novel hydrogen technologies on an industrial scale and aims to further develop the Rhenish mining area into a hydrogen model region.

The catalaix project, which she manages together with Jürgen Klankermayer and deals with the recycling of plastic waste, won the €106 million "Project of the Century" ideas competition organized by the Swiss Werner Siemens Foundation in 2023.

== Academic service ==
Palkovits leads the Sustainable Chemistry Division of the German Chemical Society. She was a founding member of AcademiaNet, a network established to address the underrepresentation of women in senior positions in science. In 2011, Palkovits' commitment to increasing diversity in science was recognised when she was selected as one of Germany's 100 Women of Tomorrow.

== Awards and honours ==
- 2006 Royal Netherlands Academy of Arts and Sciences Hendrik Casimir – Karl Ziegler Research Award
- 2010 North Rhine-Westphalia Innovation Prize
- 2010 GKSS-Prize Science for the Public
- 2010 Jochen Block-Preis
- 2014 National Academy of Engineering Frontiers of Engineering
- 2017 DECHEMA Award
- 2019 European Federation of Catalysis Societies Young Researcher award

== Memberships ==
- 2019 Max Planck Institute for Chemical Energy Conversion Max Planck Fellow
- 2020 Elected Fellow of the North Rhine-Westphalian Academy of Sciences, Humanities and the Arts

== Selected publications ==
- Ebeling, Katharina M.; Bongartz, Dominik; Mürtz, Sonja; Palkovits, Regina; Mitsos, Alexander (8 May 2024). "Thermodynamic and Economic Potential of Glycerol Oxidation to Replace Oxygen Evolution in Water Electrolysis". Industrial & Engineering Chemistry Research. 63 (18): 8250–8260. doi:10.1021/acs.iecr.3c03615. ISSN 0888-5885.
- Mürtz, Sonja D.; Lehnertz, Marcus S.; Kümper, Justus; Häger, Eike; Markus, Alexandra; Becker, Tabea; Herres-Pawlis, Sonja; Palkovits, Regina (2024). "Electrochemical depolymerisation of polylactic acid". Green Chemistry. 26 (11): 6423–6428. doi:10.1039/D3GC04234K. ISSN 1463-9262.
- Jha, Shwetambara; Jain, Priya; Palkovits, Regina; Popinand Ingole, Pravin (2023). "Tuning of cationic distribution in "partially inversed" cobalt ferrite spinel nanocubes via a nitrogen-doped graphene oxide support for enhanced bifunctional oxygen electrocatalysis". Journal of Materials Chemistry A. 11 (42): 23034–23047. doi:10.1039/D3TA03486K. ISSN 2050-7488.
- Agnieszka M Ruppert; Kamil Weinberg; Regina Palkovits (28 February 2012). "Hydrogenolysis goes bio: from carbohydrates and sugar alcohols to platform chemicals". Angewandte Chemie International Edition. 51 (11): 2564–2601. doi:10.1002/anie.201105125. ISSN 1433-7851. PMID 22374680. Wikidata Q34177931.
- Regina Palkovits; Markus Antonietti; Pierre Kuhn; Arne Thomas; Ferdi Schüth (1 January 2009). "Solid catalysts for the selective low-temperature oxidation of methane to methanol". Angewandte Chemie International Edition. 48 (37): 6909–6912. doi:10.1002/anie.200902009. ISSN 1433-7851. PMID 19655358. Wikidata Q84349991.
- Roberto Rinaldi; Regina Palkovits; Ferdi Schüth (1 January 2008). "Depolymerization of cellulose using solid catalysts in ionic liquids". Angewandte Chemie International Edition. 47 (42): 8047–8050. doi:10.1002/anie.200802879. ISSN 1433-7851. PMID 18814164. Wikidata Q82054100.
