= Frank Glorius =

German chemist (born 1972)

Frank Klaus Glorius (born 1972 in Walsrode) is a German chemist and W3-Professor of organic chemistry in the Department of Chemistry and Pharmacy at the University of Münster.

== Life and work ==
Glorius studied chemistry at the Leibniz University Hannover, completing his Diploma thesis in 1997. During his Diploma he also undertook a nine-month research stay at Stanford University with Paul A. Wender in 1995/1996. Glorius completed his Doctorate in 2000 investigating "New chiral bis-oxazoline ligands for enantioselective catalysis" at the University of Basel with Andreas Pfaltz. His PhD was divided between the Max-Planck-Institut für Kohlenforschung (1997–1999) and the University of Basel (1999–2000). Between 2000 and 2001 Glorius completed a Postdoc at Harvard University in Cambridge, with David A. Evans exploring the Total synthesis of Aflastatin A. Following this, he worked with his mentor Alois Fürstner as an independent researcher/research group leader/Assistant Professor at the Max-Planck-Institut für Kohlenforschung. In 2004, before formal completion of the habilitation, he was awarded a position as C3-Professor of Chemistry at the University of Marburg. Since August 2007, Glorius has been a Professor of Organic Chemistry at the University of Münster, where he serves Dean of the Faculty of Chemistry and Pharmacy since 2022.

Professor Glorius' research program is dedicated to the development of new catalytic methodologies in organic chemistry. His research group explores a wide range of topics including the development and application of N-heterocyclic carbenes (NHCs) in catalysis, exploration and use of NHCs as surface modifyers, C–H activation, asymmetric organocatalysis, chemo- and enantioselective hydrogenation of aromatic compounds, photoredox catalysis and energy transfer photocatalysis, heterogeneous catalysis, Metal–Organic Frameworks/MOFs, development and use of lipid analogs, and the development of reaction screening technologies.

Former members of the group have gone on to have careers in both academia (e.g. Canada, China, France, Germany, India and Japan) and industry (BASF, Bayer, Evonik, Clariant, Axalta, Lanxess, Continental, Archimica, Mitsubishi, Novartis or Janssen Pharmaceutica (Johnson & Johnson) for instance).

== Honors and awards ==
Research Awards: Glorius has received numerous grants, prizes and awards. In his early career, he was awarded the Liebig-scholarship of the Fonds der Chemischen Industrie (2001–2004), the ORCHEM-Award for Scientists (2004), and the BASF Catalysis Award (2005). Of particular note was the Alfried Krupp Prize in 2006, for €1 million, the ERC Independent Researcher Starting Grant, worth €1.5 million, in 2010, and the Gottfried Wilhelm Leibniz Prize, in 2013, from the German Research Foundation, valued at €2.5 million. Additionally, he has received the OMCOS Award in 2011, and the Springer Heterocyclic Chemistry Award in 2012. In 2013, he was elected as an honorary member of the Israel Chemical Society, and was named as "Highly Cited Researcher" in all the years since 2014 (currently till 2022). Glorius also received the Novartis Chemistry Lectureship Award for 2014/2015 and the inaugurational SYNLETT Best Paper Award 2015. In 2017 he has received the Mukaiyama Award from The Society of Synthetic Organic Chemistry, Japan (SSOCJ). Most recently, he was selected for the Arthur C. Cope Scholar Award of the American Chemical Society (ACS), for the Merck, Sharp & Dohme Award of the Royal Society of Chemistry (RSC) and for the French Gay-Lussac Humboldt Prize. Glorius also has received the Otto Bayer Award in 2022. Finally, in addition to the ERC Starting Grant in 2010, he successfully applied for ERC Advanced Grants in 2017 ("HyDream") and 2022 ("HighEnT").

Teaching Award: In addition, in 2014 Frank Glorius was awarded by the students of the Department of Chemistry&Pharmacy of the WWU Muenster with the "Goldener Brendel" for excellence in teaching. For his achievements as PhD supervisor he has received the IPMI Faculty Advisor Award 2017.

Glorius sits on the boards of numerous committees and societies, including the Kuratorium (Board of Trustees) of the Fonds der Chemischen Industrie, the selection committee of the Humboldt foundation for incoming postdocs, the German Catalysis Society (GeCatS) and the Münster branch of the German Chemical Society (2011–2014).

In 2021 Frank Glorius was elected as a member of the National Academy of Sciences Leopoldina and in 2022 he became a member of the Academia Europaea.
