= Carlos F. Barbas III =

American chemist (1964–2014)

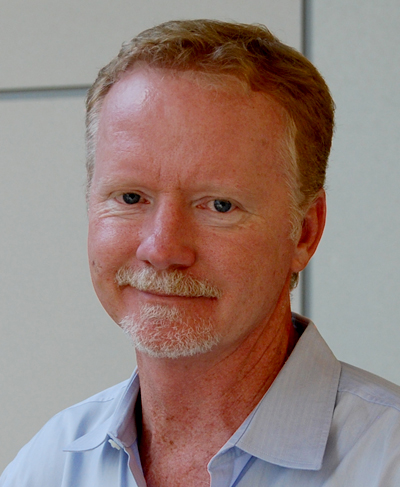
- Born: November 5, 1964; St. Petersburg, Florida
- Died: June 24, 2014 (aged 49)
- Education: Eckerd College; Texas A&M University; Pennsylvania State University
- Scientific career
- Fields: Synthetic organic chemistry Bio-therapeutics
- Workplaces: The Scripps Research Institute
- Thesis: Overproduction and utilization of enzymes in synthetic organic chemistry. (1989)
- Doctoral advisor: Chi-Huey Wong
- Other academic advisors: Stephen J. Benkovic
- Notable students: Benjamin List

Carlos F. Barbas III (5 November 1964 – 24 June 2014) was chair professor of the Janet and Keith Kellogg II and a chemist at the Scripps Research Institute. Barbas developed new therapies that can target HIV-1 and some kinds of cancer which went into clinical trials.

== Early years and education ==
Barbas was born on 5 November 1964 and he was raised up in St. Petersburg, Florida. After a few years, Barbas cultivated interests in physics and chemistry subjects and graduated from Eckerd College with honors. In 1989, he finished his PhD in Organic Chemistry under Chi-Huey Wong at the Texas A&M University.

== Career ==
From 1981 to 1991, Barbas started postdoctoral studies with Stephen J. Benkovic at the Pennsylvania State University, and began doing research with Richard Lerner at The Scripps Research Institute. From 1991 to 1995, he was assistant professor in the department of molecular biology at Scripps, where his studies emphasized on the developing new therapies against human diseases with help of synthetic organic chemistry, molecular biology and medicine fields. From 1995 to 2000 he was the associate professor at Scripps. From 1997 to April 2001, Barbas dedicated his efforts in Prolifaron LLC as a co-founder. The main aim of founding this company is to put his research on antibodies into new therapies with the new technology. From 2002 to June 2008, he privately founded another company named CovX, which is specialized in the researches on bio therapeutics. In 2008, Zynegenia, a bio-therapeutics company, was founded by Barbas. This time, Barbas dedicated to develop the next generation of drugs with the help of the antibodies invented in his researches.

== Research ==
Barbas developed the first laboratory manual of antibody phage with his colleagues at Scripps. The phage display is the most straightforward technique to study the interactions between various forms of proteins with the virus infected bacteria. With the help of this technique, more studies on operations on specific part of human genes are available. He created ZF Tools with Jeff Mandell at Scripps. The zinc finger proteins (ZFPs) can target on the specific zones in DNA sequences which helps the researchers to identify the particular sites in any DNA sequence efficiently with ZF Tools. He created the first commercially catalytic antibodies in the world. Catalytic antibody are capable of accomplishing the tasks that have been designed by the researchers in the body, which helps the researchers to understand the mechanisms of the particular zone in human body in order to develop new drugs. Barbas and his co-workers at Scripps invented antibody-drug conjugates to help create new therapies which can target on specific cell types. These antibodies are programmed with chemical methods and specialized in treatments of chronic illnesses due to its ability to target on particular sites accurately. He studied on Hajos-Eder-Sauer-Wiechert reaction and developed theories on organocatalysis based on the studies of aldolase antibodies with L-Proline. He found the similarity between the Hajos-Eder-Sauer-Wiechert reaction and the mechanical canalization function happened in the aldolase antibodies and research on the difference between the efficiency. After researching the nucleic acid libraries, he emphasize on the functions of nucleotide triphosphates and came up with the idea of the creating the DNA enzymes which can provide vitro DNA selection studies. He also developed new therapies that can target HIV-1 and some kinds of cancer and put them in to clinical trials.

As of 2021, Barbas has an h-index of 135 according to Google Scholar and of 112 according to Scopus.

== Awards ==
From 1992 to 1995, Barbas won the Scholar of the American Foundation for AIDS Research. Since 2003, Barbas is an ISI Highly Cited Research. In 2009, Barbas has been honored with numerous awards. New York Times reported that, "He was the recipient of the Investigator Award from the Cancer Research Institute, the Presidential Green Chemistry Challenge Award, Arthur C. Cope Scholar Award from the American Chemical Society, a National Institutes of Health (NIH) Director's Pioneer Award and the Tetrahedron Young Investigator Award in Bio-organic and Medicinal Chemistry." In 2014, He gain the scholar of The American Foundation for AIDS Research and was elected a member of both the American Association for the Advancement of Science and the Academy of Microbiology.

== Death ==
Barbas was diagnosed with medullary thyroid cancer and died on June 24, 2014.
