= Dirk Trauner =

Austrian chemist

Dirk Trauner (born 17 April 1967 in Linz) is an Austrian-American chemist.

== Education and training ==
From 1986 to 1991, Trauner studied biology and biochemistry at the University of Vienna. From 1992 to 1995, he studied chemistry at the Free University of Berlin and completed his diploma under Johann Mulzer, whom he followed to Frankfurt and subsequently Vienna as an assistant. In 1997, he completed his PhD under Mulzer at the University of Vienna with summa cum laude. From 1998 to 2000, he was a postdoc under Samuel J. Danishefsky at the Memorial Sloan Kettering Cancer Center in New York City. In 2000, he moved to the University of California, Berkeley, where, from 2000 to 2006, he was an assistant professor and, from 2006 to 2010, an associate professor, with additional affiliation to the Lawrence Berkeley National Laboratory from 2005 to 2008. From 2008 to 2017, he was professor for chemical biology and genetics at LMU Munich. From 2017 to 2022, he was the Janice Cutler Chair in Chemistry at New York University and adjunct professor of neuroscience at NYU Grossman School of Medicine. He currently resides as the Penn Integrates Knowledge Professor with joint appointments in the Department of Chemistry in the School of Arts & Sciences and the Department of Systems Pharmacology and Translational Therapeutics in the Perelman School of Medicine.

== Research ==
Trauner is a leader in the fields of photopharmacology and natural product total synthesis. His view is that many biologically active substances even of low molecular weight have not yet been discovered, and he has directed his research group to perform the total synthesis of such compounds. Continuing his pioneering work in photopharmacology, his research group is developing chemical tools that are useful in neuroscience and cell biology but also hold promise as precision therapeutics, controlling the activity and presence of biologically active substances using light.

== Distinctions (selected) ==
- 2021: ACS Cope Scholar Award
- 2017: Member, Leopoldina – German National Academy of Sciences
- 2016: Otto Bayer Award
- 2016: Emil Fischer Medal
- 2013: Kitasato Microbial Chemistry Medal
- 2008: Roche Excellence in Chemistry Award
- 2005: Novartis Young Investigator Award
- 2004: Amgen Young Investigator Award
