= Fratricidins =

Fratricidins are antibodies that employ receptor pleiotropism to transform tumor cells into natural killer cells that destroy other tumor cells. In 2015 the effect was demonstrated by Dr. Richard A. Lerner of The Scripps Research Institute on human acute myeloid leukemia (AML) cells.

== Mode of action ==
Most AML cells have the thrombopoietin (TPO) receptor. Fratricidins activate this receptor, turning as many as 80% first into dendritic cells and then into cells that resemble natural killer (NK) cells. NK cells are capable of rapidly attacking potentially dangerous pathogens and tumors even if they do not contain the biomarkers normally identified by other immune cells.

These induced NK cells possessed extending tendrils that had made their way through the outer membranes of nearby AML cells. The antibody-induced killer cells make large amounts of perforin, IFN-γ and granzyme B, in a different cascade from that caused by the "normal" antibody for this receptor.

In lab tests, a "modest" number of NK cells took out about 15 percent of the surrounding leukemic cell population in 24 hours. These cells attacked only related leukemia cells, but not unrelated breast cancer cells.

== See also ==
- Cancer immunotherapy
