= Helmut Schwarz =

German chemist (born 1943)

- Born: 6 August 1943 (age 82); Nickenich
- Citizenship: Germany
- Known for: Mass spectrometry
- Awards: Thomson Medal; Wolf Prize in Chemistry (2025)
- Scientific career
- Fields: Chemistry
- Institutions: Technische Universität Berlin
- Doctoral advisor: Ferdinand Bohlmann
- Doctoral students: Gernot Frenking

Helmut Schwarz (born 6 August 1943) is a German organic chemist. He has been a professor of chemistry at the Technische Universität Berlin since 1978. In 2018, he was elected a foreign associate of the U.S. National Academy of Sciences.

== Career ==
Helmut Schwarz first learned to be a chemical technician and then went on to study chemistry at the TU Berlin. He completed his studies in 1971 and obtained his PhD in 1972 and his Habilitation in 1974 under Ferdinand Bohlmann. He pursued post-doctoral work at the Massachusetts Institute of Technology (MIT) and in the UK, after which he became a professor at the TU Berlin in 1978. Schwarz studies chemical reactions, specifically gas phase chemistry of ionic and radical organic species. He is furthermore working on advancing the analytical capabilities of mass spectrometry.

He was president of the Alexander von Humboldt Foundation from 2008 to 2018. From 2010 to 2015 he was president of the German Academy of Researchers Leopoldina and he is a member of acatech.

== Honors and memberships ==
Schwarz was an editor of the International Journal of Mass Spectrometry from 1983 to 2010 and between 1990 and 1994 he was editor of Chemischen Berichte. He was part of the editorial board of Mass Spectrometry Reviews from 1990 to 2003, of Helvetica Chimica Acta (1990 to 2002), and of the Journal of the American Chemical Society (2007 to 2015).

He is a member of the following societies

- National Academy of Sciences (since 2018)
- American Academy of Arts and Sciences (since 2012)
- Estonian Academy of Sciences (since 2002)
- Academia Europaea (since 1997)
- Göttingen Academy of Sciences and Humanities (since 1997)
- Berlin-Brandenburg Academy of Sciences and Humanities (since 1992)
- German National Academy of Sciences Leopoldina (since 1992)
- Akademie gemeinnütziger Wissenschaften zu Erfurt (since 1991)

He has received numerous awards and honors, among them

- Wolf Prize in Chemistry (2025)
- BBVA Foundation Frontiers of Knowledge Award (2024)
- Leonardo da Vinci Award (2021)
- Order of the Rising Sun, Gold and Silver Star (2018)
- ENI award (2015)
- Karl Ziegler Prize (2015)
- Schrödinger Medal from the World Association of Theoretical and Computational Chemists (WATOC, 2015)
- Lichtenberg Medal (2012)
- Order of Merit of the Federal Republic of Germany (2012)
- Erwin Schrödinger Medal (2008)
- Otto Hahn Prize (2003)
- Prelog Medal, ETH Zürich (2000)
- Liebig Medal (1998)
- Max-Planck-Forschungspreis (1991, with Chava Lifshitz)
- Gottfried Wilhelm Leibniz Prize (1990)
- Otto Bayer Award (1989)
- Otto-Klung-Weberbank-Preis (1980)

== Personal life ==
In April 2023, Schwarz was one of the 22 personal guests at the ceremony in which former Chancellor Angela Merkel was decorated with the Grand Cross of the Order of Merit for special achievement by President Frank-Walter Steinmeier at Schloss Bellevue in Berlin.
