= Proline-catalyzed aldol reactions =

Reaction in organic chemistry

The Hajos–Parrish–Eder–Sauer–Wiechert and Barbas-List reactions in organic chemistry are a family of proline-catalysed asymmetric aldol reactions.

In the 1970s, two research groups discovered (and published) almost simultaneously their discoveries of two related intramolecular reactions: Zoltan Hajos and David Parrish at Hoffmann-La Roche and Rudolf Wiechert et al at Schering AG. The original Hajos-Parrish procedure begins with an achiral triketone in dimethylformamide and 3% (molar) catalytic (S)‑(−)‑proline. The product is a chiral ketol with 93.4% optical yield:

In the Eder-Sauer-Wiechert modification, the product shown above loses water to give the conjugated alkene.

Three decades later, Carlos Barbas and Benjamin List demonstrated that larger catalyst concentrates could enable a similar intermolecular reaction.

The reaction has seen extensive use in many enantiomerically-pure molecular syntheses. Indeed, it presaged the modern field of asymmetric organocatalysis.

== History ==
Researches on asymmetric enamine catalysis applied to important intermediates in steroids synthesis is due to an increased interest for efficient and convenient steroid total syntheses in the 1960s. In particular, two industrial groups in the early 1970s reported proline-catalyzed intramolecular aldol reactions.

(S)-7a-methyl-2,3,7,7a-tetrahydro-1H-indene-1,5(6H)-dione

In 1971, Escher headed a research group at Schering AG examining reactions under non-biological conditions: (S)-Proline (47 mol%) and 1N perchloric acid in acetonitrile at 80 °C. They observed condensation to the conjugated alkene, but discarded the result as not particularly useful. Their work would not become common knowledge for another 37 years, when a new group at Schering analyzed extensions to the reaction, by then associated with Hajos and Parrish.

Meanwhile, Hajos and Parrish examined similar reactions at Hoffmann-La Roche under quasi-biological conditions. Their reaction sequence produced bicyclic ketol intermediates in good yield, which, to their surprise, exhibited circular dichroism corresponding to a large enantiomeric excess. A single-crystal X-ray diffraction study confirmed this hypothesis, showing an axial methyl and equatorial hydroxyl group, as in digitoxigenin's CD-ring:

Hajos and Parrish published and patented their results in 1974, and then the field lay dormant.

In 2000, Barbas' group at Scripps began investigating antibodies for a series of aldolase enzymes, known to operate through an enamine intermediate, and discovered that one of their antibodies catalyzed an intermolecular Hajos-Parrish-Eder-Sauer-Wiechert reaction. Searching the literature, they noticed that Hajos et al had already identified a similar reaction, and began investigating whether simple enamines could substitute for their antibodies. Indeed, proline did, albeit at higher concentrations than in the original 1970s reports:

The acetone excess suppresses various possible side-reactions: the ketone and proline to an oxazolidinone; and two copies of the aldehyde and proline decarboxylating to an azomethine ylide.

The flurry of research sparked by this publication clarified multiple long-standing questions. The mechanism of the reaction had remained in question, but Barbas' group showed that it occurred through combined iminium-enamine catalysis. Barbas' collaborator List also extended the reaction to asymmetric prochiral ketones:

List and Notz also revealed that proline and 5,5-dimethyl thiazolidinium-4-carboxylate appeared to be optimal catalysts within a large group of screened amines. In 2002 the Macmillan group demonstrated a proline-catalyzed aldol reaction between aldehydes. This reaction is unusual because in general aldehydes will self-condense.

(S)-1-(2-pyrrolidinylmethyl)-pyrrolidine salts would forme the basis for the development of diamine organocatalysts that have proven effective in a wide variety or organocatalytic reactions.

== Reaction mechanism ==
Several reaction mechanisms for the triketone reaction have been proposed over the years. Hajos and Parrish proposed the enamine mechanism in their paper^{[2]}. However, their experiment with a stoichiometric amount of labeled water (H_{2}^{18}O) supported a carbinolamine mechanism. Therefore, Hajos put forward (1974) a hemiaminal intermediate.^{[2]} The Agami mechanism (1984) has an enamine intermediate with two proline units involved in the transition state (based on experimental reaction kinetics) and according to a mechanism by Houk (2001) a single proline unit suffices with a cyclic transition state and with the proline carboxyl group involved in hydrogen bonding.

The hemiaminal (carbinolamine) put forward by Hajos in 1974 can change to a tautomeric iminium hydroxide intermediate. The iminium hydroxide ion caused enolization of the side chain methyl ketone would be followed by ring closure to the above shown optically active bicyclic ketol product (see Figure 1.) under the influence of the catalytic amount of (S)-(−)-proline. Pengxin Zhou, Long Zhang, Sanzhong Luo, and Jin-Pei Cheng obtained excellent results using the simple chiral primary amine t-Bu-CH(NH_{2})-CH_{2}-NEt_{2}.TfOH for the synthesis of both the Wieland-Miescher ketone and the Hajos-Parrish ketone as well as their analogues. This supports the iminium mechanism, because it is textbook chemistry that primary amines form imines rather than enamines with carbonyl compounds.

The Hajos 1974 carbinolamine mechanism has had an unwitting support in a more recent paper by Michael Limbach. The triketone starting material 2- methyl-2-(3-oxobutyl)-1,3-cyclopentanedione gave the expected optically active bicyclic ketol (+)-(3aS,7aS)-3a,4,7,7a-tetrahydro-3a-hydroxy-7a-methyl-1,5(6H)-indanedione with (S)-(−)-proline catalyst. On the other hand, the stereochemical outcome is reversed with ee selectivities of up to 83% by using the homologue amino acid catalysts, such as (S)-β-homoproline, [(pyrrolidine-(2S)-yl) acetic acid]. The virtual anomaly can be explained with a top side approach of the bulkier beta amino acids to the above triketone starting material of reflective symmetry. The top side approach results in the formation of an enantiotopic carbinolamine to give the (−)-(3aR,7aR)-3a,4,7,7a-tetrahydro-3a-hydroxy-7a-methyl-1,5(6H)-indanedione bicyclic ketol enantiomer identical to the one obtained with unnatural (R)-(+)-proline. List in 2010 on the other hand is perplexed and surprised that Hajos rejected the enamine mechanism, certainly in light of earlier work by Spencer in 1965 on amine catalysed aldol reactions. It is interesting and surprising that Eder, Sauer and Wiechert have not attempted to explain the reaction mechanism.^{[3]}

The reaction mechanism as proposed by the Barbas group in 2000 for the intermolecular reactions is based also on enamine formation and the observed stereoselectivity based on the Zimmerman-Traxler model favoring Re-face approach. This is the same mechanism proposed by Barbas for aldolase antibodies reported by the group in 1995:

This enamine mechanism also drives the original Hajos-Parrish triketone reaction but the involvement of two proline molecules in it as proposed by Agami is disputed by Barbas based on the lack of a non-linear effects and supported by later studies of List based on reaction kinetics. The general mechanism is further supported by List by the finding that in a reaction carried out in labeled water (H_{2}^{18}O), the oxygen isotope finds its way into the reaction product. The Hajos and Parrish experiment with a stoechiometric amount of labeled water (H_{2}^{18}O) supported the carbinolamine mechanism.^{[2]}

In the same study ^{[20]} the reaction of proline with acetone to the oxazolidinone (in DMSO) was examined:

The equilibrium constant for this reaction is only 0.12 leading List to conclude that the involvement of oxazolidinone is only parasitic.

Blackmond in 2004 also found oxazolidinones as intermediates (NMR) in a related proline-catalysed α-aminooxylation of propanal with nitrosobenzene:

Chiong Teck Wong of the Institute of High Performance Computing Singapore studied the similar oxyamination reaction of nitrosobenzene with butanal using a chiral prolinol silyl ether catalyst. His studies strongly suggest that the catalyst generates the enol, and forms an enol-catalyst complex. Nitsosobenzene subsequently reacts with the enol-catalyst complex to afford the (S)-N-nitroso aldol product in agreement with Pauling's chart of electronegativity. Sodiumborohydride reduction of the primarily formed aldol products gave the corresponding alcohols in good yield and excellent enantioselectivity in the ratio of P_{N}/P_{O}=>99:1 as shown in the Scheme below. Wong suggests that the reaction mechanism of the (S)-Cat catalyzed N-nitroso aldol reaction between nitrosobenzene and butanal proceeds via an enol intermediate and not via an enamine intermediate.

The view of oxazolidinones as a parasitic species is contested by Seebach and Eschenmoser who in 2007 published an article in which they argue that oxazolidinones in fact play a pivotal role in proline catalysis. One of the things they did was reacting an oxazolidinone with the activated aldehyde chloral in an aldol addition:

In 2008, Barbas in an essay addressed the question why it took until the year 2000 before interest regenerated for this seemingly simple reaction 30 years after the pioneering work by Hajos and Parrish and why the proline catalysis mechanism appeared to be an enigma for so long. One explanation has to do with different scientific cultures: a proline mechanism in the context of aldolase catalysis already postulated in 1964 by a biochemist was ignored by organic chemists. Another part of the explanation was the presumed complexity of aldolase catalysis that dominated chemical thinking for a long time. Finally, research did not expand in this area at Hoffmann-La Roche after the resignation of ZGH in November, 1970.

== Origin of the name of the reaction ==
The name for this reaction took some time to develop. In 1985 Professor Agami and associates were the first to name the proline catalyzed Robinson annulation the Hajos-Parrish reaction. In 1986 Professor Henri B. Kagan and Professor Agami still called it the Hajos-Parrish reaction in the Abstract of this paper. In 2001 Kagan published a paper entitled "Nonlinear Effects in Asymmetric Catalysis: A Personal Account" in Synlett. In this paper he introduced the new title the Hajos-Parrish-Wiechert reaction. In 2002 Benjamin List added two more names and introduced the term Hajos–Parrish–Eder–Sauer–Wiechert reaction. Scientific papers published as late as 2008 in the field of organocatalysis use either the 1985, 2001 or 2002 names of the reaction. A June, 2014 search limited to the years 2009–2014 by Google Scholar returns 44 hits for Hajos-Parrish reaction, 3 for Hajos-Parrish-Wiechert reaction and 184 for Hajos–Parrish–Eder–Sauer–Wiechert reaction. The term 'Hajos-Parrish ketone' (and similar) remains common, however.
