= Prolinol =

Names
- IUPAC name (R/S) 2-pyrrolidinemethanol

Identifiers
CAS Number	68832-13-3 (D-prolinol); 23356-96-9 (L-prolinol)
3D model (JSmol)	(D-prolinol): Interactive image; (L-prolinol): Interactive image
ChemSpider	2006673 (D-prolinol); 555468 (L-prolinol)
ECHA InfoCard	100.157.355
EC Number	245-605-2
PubChem CID	2724541 (D-prolinol); 640091 (L-prolinol)
UNII	H52Z235V6Y
CompTox Dashboard (EPA)	DTXSID301020303 DTXSID00988536, DTXSID301020303
- InChI: (D-prolinol): InChI=1S/C5H11NO/c7-4-5-2-1-3-6-5/h5-7H,1-4H2/t5-/m1/s1 Key: HVVNJUAVDAZWCB-RXMQYKEDSA-N; (L-prolinol): InChI=1S/C5H11NO/c7-4-5-2-1-3-6-5/h5-7H,1-4H2/t5-/m0/s1 Key: HVVNJUAVDAZWCB-YFKPBYRVSA-N
- SMILES: (D-prolinol): C1C[C@@H](NC1)CO; (L-prolinol): C1C[C@H](NC1)CO

Properties
Chemical formula	C_{5}H_{11}NO
Molar mass	101.149 g·mol^{−1}
Appearance	Liquid
Density	1.036 g/mL (liquid)
Boiling point	74–76 °C (165–169 °F; 347–349 K) at 2 mmHg

Hazards
- Occupational safety and health (OHS/OSH)
Main hazards	Irritant
- GHS labelling
Pictograms	(GHS07: Exclamation mark)
Signal word	Warning
Hazard statements	H315, H319, H335
Precautionary statements	P261, P264, P271, P280, P302+P352, P304+P340, P305+P351+P338, P312, P321, P332+P313, P337+P313, P362, P403+P233, P405, P501
Flash point	86 °C (187 °F; 359 K)
- Except where otherwise noted, data are given for materials in their standard state (at 25 °C [77 °F], 100 kPa). verify (what is ?) Infobox references

Prolinol is a chiral amino-alcohol that is used as a chiral building block in organic synthesis. It exists as two enantiomers: the D and L forms.

== Preparation ==
Prolinol is obtained by reduction of the amino acid proline using lithium aluminium hydride. Because proline is cheaply available in high optical purity, enantiomerically pure prolinol is also widely available.

== Use ==
Prolinol is used in broad variety of chemical reactions as chiral ligand, chiral catalyst or chiral auxiliary reagent in the Hajos–Parrish–Eder–Sauer–Wiechert reaction, the Baylis–Hillman reaction, Noyori type reactions and the Michael reaction.

== See also ==
- Enantioselective synthesis
