= Otto Bayer Award =

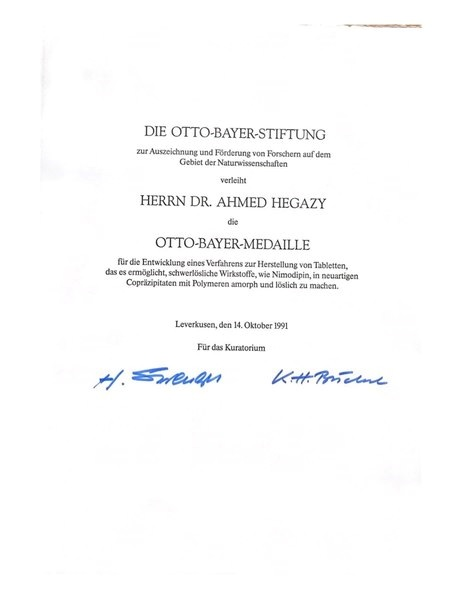
1991 Otto Bayer award

The Otto Bayer Award is awarded every two years by the Bayer Foundation to scientists in the German-speaking region for groundbreaking innovative pioneering research in the fields of chemistry and biochemistry. The prize was established in 1984 in memory of Otto Bayer, the inventor of polyurethane chemistry and long-time head of research at Bayer AG. The Otto Bayer Prize is endowed with 75,000 euros. It is awarded every two years in alternation with the Hansen Family Award.

== Recipients ==
- 1984 Gerhard Wegner
- 1985 Heinz Saedler, Jozef Schell und Klaus Hahlbrock
- 1986 Horst Kessler, Manfred T. Reetz
- 1987 Martin Jansen, Arndt Simon
- 1988 Johann Deisenhofer, Hartmut Michel
- 1989 Helmut Schwarz
- 1990 Wolfgang A. Herrmann, Kurt Peter C. Vollhardt
- 1991 Martin Quack
- 1992 Herbert Jäckle, Christiane Nüsslein-Volhard
- 1993 François Diederich, Dieter Hoppe
- 1994 Robert Schlögl
- 1995 Gerhard Erker, Paul Knochel
- 1996 Stefan Jentsch
- 1998 Ulrich Koert, Carsten Bolm
- 2001 Herbert Waldmann
- 2003 Christian Griesinger
- 2006 Alois Fürstner
- 2008 Thomas Carell
- 2010 Detlef Weigel
- 2012 Benjamin List
- 2014 Frédéric Merkt
- 2016 Dirk Trauner
- 2018 Tobias J. Erb
- 2020 Ruth Ley
- 2022 Frank Glorius
- 2024 Meritxell Huch
