= Julia Laskin =

Russian–American Chemist

- Юлия Кимовна Ласкина
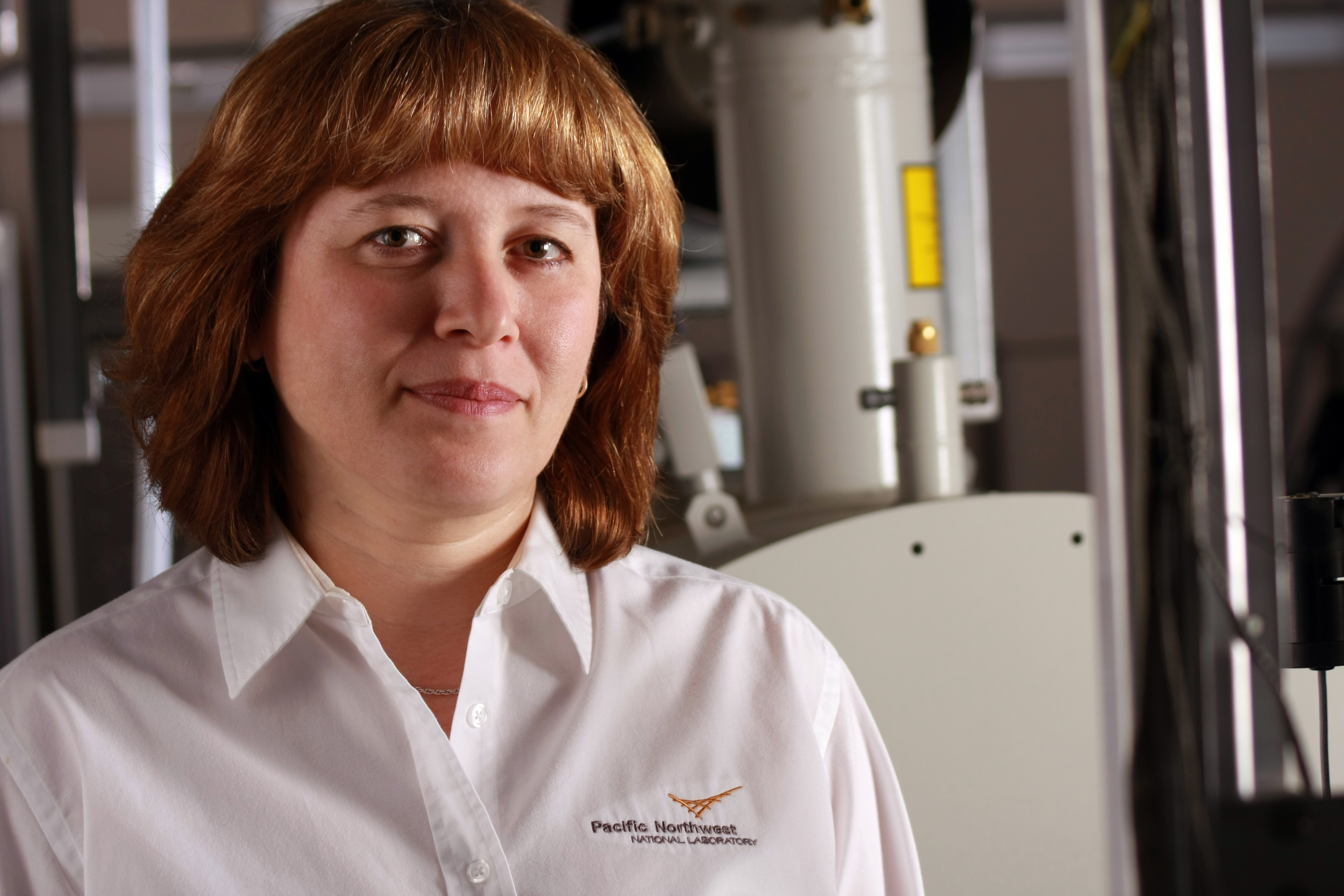
- Laskin at Pacific Northwest National Laboratory in 2008
- Born: 1967 (age 58–59); Leningrad, Russian SFSR, Soviet Union
- Education: Peter the Great St. Petersburg Polytechnic University; Hebrew University of Jerusalem
- Scientific career
- Workplaces: Purdue University; Pacific Northwest National Laboratory; University of Delaware
- Website: Julia Laskin Laboratory

Julia Laskin (Russian: Юлия Кимовна Ласкина) is the William F. and Patty J. Miller Distinguished Professor of Analytical Chemistry at Purdue University. Her research is focused on the fundamental understanding of ion-surface collisions, understanding of phenomena underlying chemical analysis of large molecules in complex heterogeneous environments, and the development of new instrumentation and methods in preparative and imaging mass spectrometry.

== Early life and education ==
Laskin was born in Leningrad, Soviet Union. She has said that she had a very good chemistry teacher at high school. She studied at the Peter the Great St. Petersburg Polytechnic University, where she earned Master's of science degree in 1990. When Perestroika opened the borders and allowed people to leave Russia, Laskin and her husband immigrated to Israel. Laskin joined the Hebrew University of Jerusalem, where she worked toward a doctoral degree under the supervision of Prof. Chava Lifshitz. She earned her PhD in 1998 and moved to the University of Delaware, where she worked as a postdoctoral fellow with Prof. jean Futrell. In 2000, Laskin joined the Pacific Northwest National Laboratory as a postdoctoral fellow. She was appointed a Research Scientist at the United States Department of Energy Environmental Molecular Sciences Laboratory in 2003 and promoted to the highest scientific rank in 2011. In 2017, she joined the Department of Chemistry at Purdue University as the William F. and Patty J. Miller Professor of Analytical Chemistry and was promoted to the Distinguished Professor position in 2026.

== Research and career ==
Laskin works in gas phase ion chemistry. She has been involved with the development of analytical techniques to better characterize synthetic and natural polymers. She showed that the soft-landing of mass-selected ions is a powerful technique to study catalysts. She has also worked on the development of bioanalytical and environmental mass spectrometry.

Laskin served on the editorial board for the Journal of the American Society for Mass Spectrometry (2011-2016). She is an editor of the International Journal of Mass Spectrometry, and serves on the editorial advisory board for Mass Spectrometry Reviews. She is Chair of the American Chemical Society Joint Board Council Committee on Publications. She was the President of the American Society for Mass Spectrometry (2022-2024), after serving as Vice President for Programs from 2020 to 2022.

== Awards and honors ==
- 2007 Presidential Early Career Award (PECASE) for Scientists and Engineers
- 2007 U.S. Department of Energy's Office of Science and its National Nuclear Security Administration Early Career Scientist and Engineer Award
- 2008 American Society for Mass Spectrometry Biemann Medal
- 2011 American Chemical Society Women Chemists Committee Rising Star Award
- 2011 Pacific Northwest National Laboratory Fellow
- 2014 Pacific Northwest National Laboratory Director's Science and Engineering Achievement Award
- 2017 Medal of the Russian Society for Mass Spectrometry
- 2018 Purdue University Innovators Hall of Fame
- 2019 American Society for Mass Spectrometry Ron Hites Award, along with co-authors for the article titled, Towards High-Resolution Tissue Imaging Using Nanospray Desorption Electrospray Ionization Mass Spectrometry Coupled to Shear Force Microscopy
- 2022 Brazilian Society of Mass Spectrometry Manuel Riveros Medal

== Selected publications ==
- Alexander Laskin; Julia Laskin; Sergey A Nizkorodov (2015). "Chemistry of atmospheric brown carbon". Chemical Reviews. 115 (10): 4335–4382. doi:10.1021/cr5006167. PMID 25716026. Wikidata Q46527733.
- Jeramie Watrous; Patrick Roach; Theodore Alexandrov; et al. (2012). "Mass spectral molecular networking of living microbial colonies". Proceedings of the National Academy of Sciences of the United States of America. 109 (26): E1743-52. Bibcode:2012PNAS..109E1743W. doi:10.1073/pnas.1203689109. PMC 3387089. PMID 22586093. Wikidata Q30519465.
- Patrick J Roach; Julia Laskin; Alexander Laskin (2010). "Nanospray desorption electrospray ionization: an ambient method for liquid-extraction surface sampling in mass spectrometry". Analyst. 135 (9): 2233–2236. Bibcode:2010Ana...135.2233R. doi:10.1039/c0an00312c. PMID 20593081. Wikidata Q34123550.

=== Books ===
- Chava Lifshitz (2006). Principles of Mass Spectrometry Applied to Biomolecules. Wiley Online Library. doi:10.1002/047005042x. ISBN 978-0-470-05042-2. Wikidata Q59511081.
