= Chava Lifshitz =

Israeli chemist

- חוה ליפשיץ
- Born: March 26, 1936; Vienna
- Died: March 1, 2005 (aged 68)
- Education: Hebrew University of Jerusalem
- Scientific career
- Workplaces: Hebrew University of Jerusalem; Cornell University; Argonne National Laboratory
- Thesis: Isotope Effects in the Radiation Chemistry of Aqueous Solutions (1961)

Chava Lifshitz (Hebrew: חוה ליפשיץ; March 26, 1936 – March 1, 2005), née Eva Wolf, was an Austrian-Israeli chemist who was best known for her contributions to mass spectrometry and the gas-phase chemistry of ions. She was awarded the Israel Chemical Society Prize for Outstanding Scientist in 2003.

== Early life and education ==
Lifshitz was born Eva Wolf in Vienna. She was born to an upper middle class family. Her father, Salomon Wolf worked as a lawyer in Vienna. When Austria was annexed into Nazi Germany, her father emigrated to Eretz Yisrael, and their names became Hebrew. She performed well at school and had piano lessons with composer Paul Ben-Haim. Lifschitz was an undergraduate student in chemistry at the Hebrew University of Jerusalem, where she was involved with a program that involved military service. She remained at the Hebrew University for doctoral studies, where she studied isotope effects in radiation chemistry. During her graduate studies she met her future husband, Assa Lifshitz. Lifshitz was a postdoctoral scholar with Franklin A. Long at Cornell University, where she started to work with mass spectrometry and unimolecular fragmentations of polyatomic ions.

== Research career ==
In 1963 Lifshitz returned to the Hebrew University of Jerusalem, where she established her own independent research group and was appointed Professor in 1976. Lifshitz worked as a visiting scientist at Argonne National Laboratory, where she worked on VUV photoionisation mass spectrometry. She also worked as a visiting scientist at Cornell University and Wright-Patterson Air Force Base. In 1986 Lifshitz was appointed a Brotherton Research Professor at the University of Leeds, where she started working on biomolecules and reaction dynamics. Lifshitz held various senior positions at the Hebrew University, including Chair of the Chemistry Division, head of the Mass spectrometry laboratory and member of the Israel Board of higher Education. She was named the Archie and Markorie Sherman Professor of Chemistry in 1989. Lifshitz worked on mass spectrometry and the gas-phase chemistry of ions.

== Awards and honors ==
- 1985: Technion – Israel Institute of Technology Kolthoff Prize
- 1991: Max Planck Research Prize with Helmut Schwarz
- 1991: President of the Israel Society for Mass Spectrometry
- 2003: Israel Chemical Society Prize for Outstanding Scientist

== Selected publications ==
- Chava Lifshitz (March 6, 2006). Principles of Mass Spectrometry Applied to Biomolecules. Wiley Online Library. doi:10.1002/047005042x. ISBN 978-0-470-05042-2. Wikidata Q59511081.
- Julia Laskin; Lifshitz C (May 1, 2001). "Kinetic energy release distributions in mass spectrometry". Journal of Mass Spectrometry. 36 (5): 459–478. doi:10.1002/jms.164. ISSN 1076-5174. PMID 11391803. Wikidata Q59511106.
- Lifshitz, C.; Wu, R. L. C.; Tiernan, T. O.; Terwilliger, D. T. (1978). "Negative ion–molecule reactions of ozone and their implications on the thermochemistry of O3−". The Journal of Chemical Physics. 68 (1): 247. doi:10.1063/1.435489. ISSN 0021-9606. *LIFSHITZ, C. (August 19, 2010). "ChemInform Abstract: Tropylium Ion Formation from Toluene: Solution of an Old Problem in Organic Mass Spectrometry". ChemInform. 25 (38) chin.199438315: no. doi:10.1002/chin.199438315. ISSN 0931-7597.

== Personal life ==
Chava and Assa Lifshitz had three children, Ron, Donna and Orna Lifshitz. She held a long-term cancer diagnosis, which she lived with for over twenty years.
