= Benjamin List =

German chemist (born 1968)

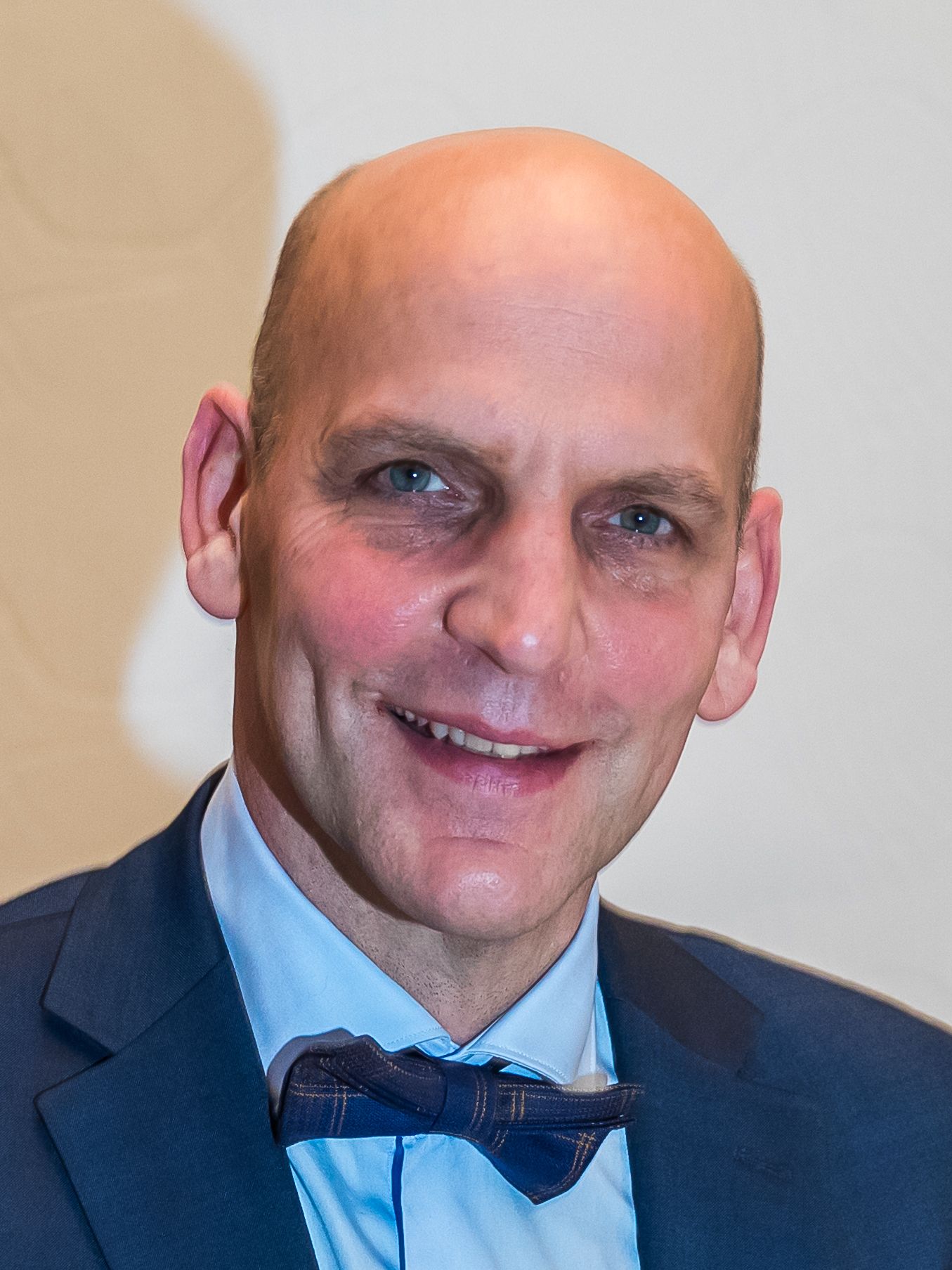
- Benjamin List in 2021
- Born: 11 January 1968 (age 58); Frankfurt, West Germany
- Education: Free University of Berlin (Diplom); Goethe University Frankfurt (PhD)
- Relatives: Christiane Nüsslein-Volhard (aunt)
- Awards: Gottfried Wilhelm Leibniz Prize (2016); Nobel Prize in Chemistry (2021)
- Scientific career
- Institutions: University of Cologne; Max Planck Institute for Coal Research; Hokkaido University
- Thesis: Synthese eines Vitamin B 12 Semicorrins (1997)
- Doctoral advisor: Johann Mulzer
- Other academic advisors: Richard Lerner; Carlos F. Barbas III

Benjamin List (German pronunciation: [ˈbɛnjamiːn ˈlɪst]; born 11 January 1968) is a German chemist who is one of the directors of the Max Planck Institute for Coal Research and professor of organic chemistry at the University of Cologne. He co-developed organocatalysis, a method of accelerating chemical reactions and making them more efficient. He shared the 2021 Nobel Prize in Chemistry with David MacMillan "for the development of asymmetric organocatalysis".

== Background ==
Born to an upper-middle-class family of scientists and artists in Frankfurt, List is a great-grandson of the cardiologist Franz Volhard and a 2nd great-grandson of the chemist Jacob Volhard. His aunt, the 1995 Nobel laureate in medicine Christiane Nüsslein-Volhard, is the sister of his mother, architect Heidi List. At age three, his parents divorced.

== Career and research ==
List obtained his Diplom (M.Sc.) degree in chemistry from the Free University of Berlin in 1993, and his PhD from Goethe University Frankfurt in 1997. His doctoral dissertation was titled Synthese eines Vitamin B 12 Semicorrins (Synthesis of a Vitamin B 12 Semicorrin), and was advised by Johann Mulzer. List worked at the Scripps Research Institute Department of Molecular Biology in La Jolla, US as a postdoctoral researcher in Carlos F. Barbas III and Richard Lerner's research groups from 1997 to 1998 with a scholarship from the Alexander von Humboldt Foundation and as an assistant professor from 1999 to 2003.

In 2003 he returned to Germany to become group leader at the Max Planck Institute for Coal Research, and in 2005 he became one of the institute's directors, heading the Homogeneous Catalysis Department. He served as the institute's managing director from 2012 to 2014. He has held a part-time position as an honorary professor of organic chemistry at the University of Cologne since 2004. List is also a principal investigator at the Institute for Chemical Reaction Design and Discovery, Hokkaido University since 2018. He is the editor-in-chief of the scientific journal Synlett. As of 2021, he has an h-index of 95 according to Google Scholar and of 86 according to Scopus.

Catalyst for asymmetric reactions, L-proline

List is considered to be one of the founders of organocatalysis, which uses non-metal and non-enzyme catalysts. In particular, while still an assistant professor he discovered the possibility of using the amino acid proline as an efficient chiral catalyst. This takes place in intermolecular aldol reactions, in which carbon atoms from two different molecules are bonded together, induced by proline. The development is based on the Hajos–Parrish–Eder–Sauer–Wiechert reaction. Subsequently, he developed the first proline-catalyzed Mannich, Michael, and α-amination reactions. He found asymmetric catalysis (especially Asymmetric counteranion directed catalysis, ACDC). He developed also new methods of textile organic catalysis, in which soluble organic catalysts and textiles are bound. These methods could, for example, help to treat water where there is no fresh water. Asymmetric organocatalysis is particularly important in bioactive organic compounds, where the chirality of the compounds is important, for example in drug production.

On 6 October 2021, he was awarded the Nobel Prize in Chemistry with David MacMillan "for the development of asymmetric organocatalysis."

== Personal life ==
List married Sabine List in La Jolla in 1999 and they have two sons, Theo and Paul. They all survived the 2004 Indian Ocean earthquake and tsunami.

List's parents sought to raise their children with an anti-authoritarian parenting style; he has admitted occasionally using the approach with his own children, stating that "you may only be 12, but if you think it will do you good to eat ten chocolate bars, then go ahead and do it. I have faith in you. But my advice is: I wouldn't do it."

== Honors and awards ==
- 1994 NaFöG-Award from the City of Berlin
- 1997 Feodor Lynen Fellowship of the Alexander von Humboldt Foundation
- 2000 Synthesis-Synlett Journal Award
- 2003 Carl-Duisberg-Memorial Award of the German Chemical Society
- 2004 Degussa Prize for Chiral Chemistry
- 2004 Lecturer's Award of the Fonds der Chemischen Industrie
- 2004 Lieseberg Prize of the University of Heidelberg
- 2005 AstraZeneca European Lectureship, the Society of Synthetic Chemistry, Japan
- 2005 Lectureship Award
- 2005 Novartis Young Investigator Award
- 2006 JSPS Fellowship Award of Japan
- 2007 AstraZeneca Award in Organic Chemistry
- 2007 Award of the Fonds der Chemischen Industrie
- 2007 OBC-Lecture Award
- 2008 Visiting professor at Sungkyunkwan University, Korea
- 2009 Boehringer-Ingelheim Lectureship, Canada
- 2009 Organic Reactions Lectureship, US
- 2009 Thomson Reuters Citation Laureate
- 2011 Boehringer-Ingelheim Lectureship, Harvard University, US
- 2011 ERC Advanced Grant
- 2012 Novartis Chemistry Lectureship Award
- 2012 Otto Bayer Award
- 2013 Horst-Pracejus-Preis
- 2013 Mukaiyama Award
- 2013 Ruhrpreis, Mülheim, Germany
- 2014 Cope Scholar Award, US
- 2014 Thomson Reuters Highly Cited Researcher
- 2015 Carl Shipp Marvel Lectures, University of Illinois at Urbana-Champaign, US
- 2016 Gottfried Wilhelm Leibniz Prize
- 2017 Prof. U. R. Ghatak Endowment Lecture, Indian Association for the Cultivation of Science (IACS), Kolkata, India
- 2017 Ta-shue Chou Lectureship, Institute of Chemistry, Academia Sinica, Taipei, Taiwan
- 2018 Member of the German National Academy of Sciences Leopoldina
- 2019 Herbert C. Brown Lecture, Purdue University, Indiana, US
- 2019 Web of Science Citation Laureate in Chemistry
- 2021 TCR Lecture, 100th CSJ Annual Meeting, Japan
- 2021 Nobel Prize in Chemistry
- 2022 Herbert C. Brown Award 2022 for Creative Research in Synthetic Methodes
- 2024 John Stauffer Distinguished Lecture in the Sciences University of Southern California
- 2024 Criegee Lectureship (Karlsruhe Institute of Technology)

== Selected works ==
- List, Benjamin; Lerner, Richard A.; Barbas, Carlos F. (26 February 2000). "Proline-Catalyzed Direct Asymmetric Aldol Reactions". Journal of the American Chemical Society. 122 (10). American Chemical Society (ACS): 2395–2396. Bibcode:2000JAChS.122.2395L. doi:10.1021/ja994280y. ISSN 0002-7863.
- Mayer, Sonja; List, Benjamin (19 June 2006). "Asymmetric Counteranion-Directed Catalysis". Angewandte Chemie International Edition. 45 (25). Wiley: 4193–4195. Bibcode:2006ACIE...45.4193M. doi:10.1002/anie.200600512. ISSN 1433-7851. PMID 16721891.
- Čorić, Ilija; List, Benjamin (2012). "Asymmetric spiroacetalization catalysed by confined Brønsted acids". Nature. 483 (7389). Springer Science and Business Media LLC: 315–319. Bibcode:2012Natur.483..315C. doi:10.1038/nature10932. ISSN 0028-0836. PMID 22422266. S2CID 4401955.
- Kaib, Philip S. J.; Schreyer, Lucas; Lee, Sunggi; Properzi, Roberta; List, Benjamin (6 October 2016). "Extremely Active Organocatalysts Enable a Highly Enantioselective Addition of Allyltrimethylsilane to Aldehydes". Angewandte Chemie International Edition. 55 (42). Wiley: 13200–13203. Bibcode:2016ACIE...5513200K. doi:10.1002/anie.201607828. ISSN 1433-7851. PMID 27653018.
- Tsuji, Nobuya; Kennemur, Jennifer L.; Buyck, Thomas; Lee, Sunggi; Prévost, Sébastien; Kaib, Philip S. J.; Bykov, Dmytro; Farès, Christophe; List, Benjamin (29 March 2018). "Activation of olefins via asymmetric Brønsted acid catalysis". Science. 359 (6383). American Association for the Advancement of Science (AAAS): 1501–1505. Bibcode:2018Sci...359.1501T. doi:10.1126/science.aaq0445. hdl:21.11116/0000-0001-2AD6-F. ISSN 0036-8075. PMID 29599238. S2CID 4549863.
- Lee, J.-W.; Mayer-Gall, T.; Opwis, K.; Song, C. E.; Gutmann, J. S.; List, B. (12 September 2013). "Organotextile Catalysis". Science. 341 (6151). American Association for the Advancement of Science (AAAS): 1225–1229. Bibcode:2013Sci...341.1225L. doi:10.1126/science.1242196. ISSN 0036-8075. PMID 24031014. S2CID 206550607.
- Zhang, Zhipeng; Bae, Han Yong; Guin, Joyram; Rabalakos, Constantinos; van Gemmeren, Manuel; Leutzsch, Markus; Klussmann, Martin; List, Benjamin (17 August 2016). "Asymmetric counteranion-directed Lewis acid organocatalysis for the scalable cyanosilylation of aldehydes". Nature Communications. 7 (1) 12478. Springer Science and Business Media LLC. Bibcode:2016NatCo...712478Z. doi:10.1038/ncomms12478. ISSN 2041-1723. PMC 4992067. PMID 27530470.
