= Anna Hirsch =

German chemist

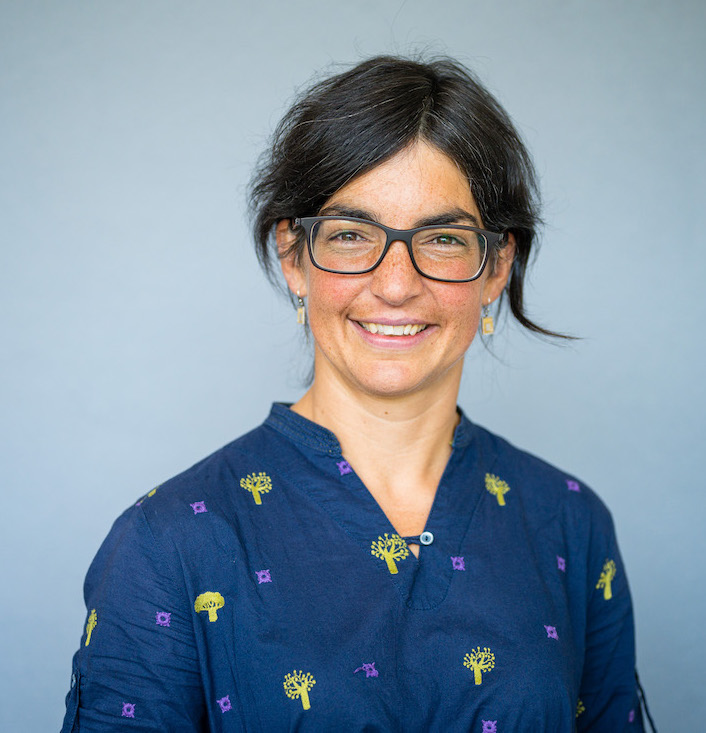
- Anna K. H. Hirsch
- Born: 1982 (age 43–44); Trier
- Occupation: Professor of Medicinal Chemistry
- Title: Professor

Academic background
- Education: ETH Zurich
- Thesis: A Novel Approach towards Antimalarials: Design and Synthesis of Inhibitors of the Kinase IspE (2008)
- Doctoral advisor: François Diederich

Academic work
- Discipline: Medicinal Chemist
- Institutions: Saarland University
- Website: https://www.helmholtz-hips.de/en/research/teams/team/drug-design-and-optimisation/

Anna Katharina Herta Hirsch (born 1982 in Trier) is a German-Luxembourg chemist and professor of medicinal chemistry at Saarland University. Since 2017, she has headed the Department of Drug Design and Optimization at the Helmholtz Institute for Pharmaceutical Research Saarland (HIPS).

Her team focuses on targeted rational drug design to regulate enzymes, transporters, and regulators in bacterial, parasitic and viral pathogens.

== Career and research ==
Hirsch studied natural sciences at the University of Cambridge and completed a year of study at the Massachusetts Institute of Technology. For her master's thesis, Hirsch conducted research in the team of Steven V. Ley at the University of Cambridge.

She completed her doctoral thesis in the research group of François Diederich at ETH Zurich. Here Hirsch worked on structure-based de novo design and on the synthesis of anti-infectives.

She then moved as an HFSP postdoc to the group of Jean-Marie Lehn at the Institut de Science et d'Ingénierie Supramoléculaires (ISIS) in Strasbourg.

In 2010, Hirsch accepted a position as assistant professor at the Stratingh Institute for Chemistry at the University of Groningen, where she was appointed professor in 2015.

In addition to her work as department head at HIPS, she has been a professor of pharmacy at Saarland University since 2017.

== Honors and awards ==
2011	Elected member of the Institut Grand-Ducal: Section des Sciences, Luxembourg
2012 – 2014	Appointment as Global Shaper of the Netherlands (World Economic Forum)
2014	Gratama Science Prize (€25,000)
2016	SCT-Servier Award „Prix à l’Encouragement à la Recherche en Chimie Thérapeutique“ together with Dr. M. Montes
2017	Innovation Award in Medicinal/Pharmaceutical Chemistry, GDCh & DPhG
2018	ERC Starting Grant "Identification and optimisation of novel anti-infective agents using multiple hit-identification strategies"
2019	European Federation for Medicinal Chemistry and Chemical Biology (EFMC) Award for a Young Medicinal Chemist in Academia (Second place)
