= Bohlmann–Rahtz pyridine synthesis =

Chemical reaction

Named after	Ferdinand Bohlmann; Dieter Rahtz
Reaction type	Ring forming reaction

Identifiers
Organic Chemistry Portal	bohlmann-rahtz-pyridine-synthesis

In organic chemistry, the Bohlmann–Rahtz pyridine synthesis is a reaction that generates substituted pyridines in two steps, first a condensation reaction between an enamine and an ethynylketone to form an aminodiene intermediate, which after heat-induced E/Z isomerization undergoes a cyclodehydration to yield 2,3,6-trisubstituted pyridines.

Bohlmann–Rahtz pyridine synthesis
