= Thomas Carell =

German biochemist

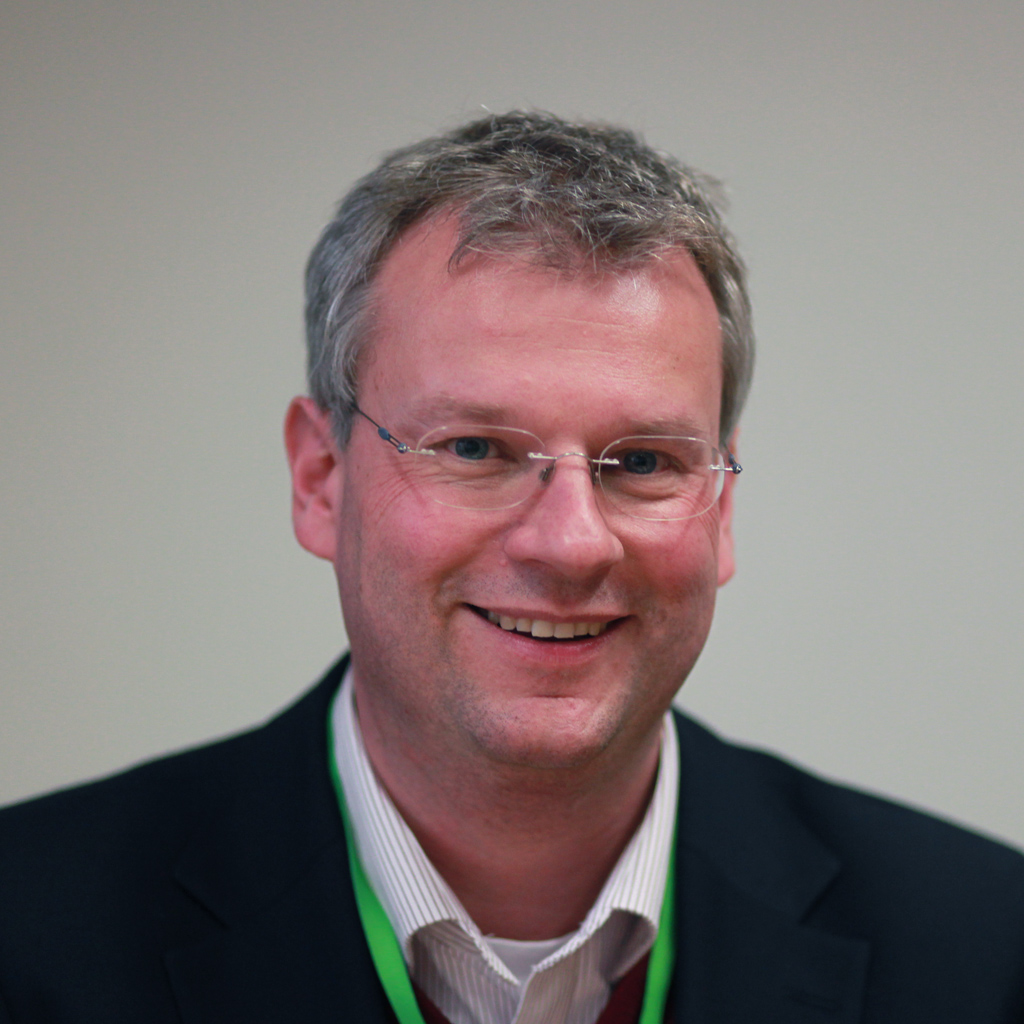
Thomas Carell (February 2011)

Thomas Carell (born 1966) is a German biochemist.

== Early life and education ==
Carell was born in 1966 in Herford, Germany. He studied chemistry from 1985 until 1990 at the University of Münster finishing with a diploma thesis at the Max Planck Institute for Medical Research Heidelberg. After his PhD thesis on Porphyrin chemistry at the same institute, he did his postdoctoral at the Massachusetts Institute of Technology in 1993.

He finished his habilitation on DNA repair proteins at ETH Zurich in 1998.

== Career ==
From 2000 until 2004, he was professor for organic chemistry at Marburg University until he became professor for organic chemistry at LMU Munich. His main interest is still the DNA repair system.

== Awards and honors ==
In 2004, he received the Gottfried Wilhelm Leibniz Prize of the Deutsche Forschungsgemeinschaft, which is the highest honour awarded in German research. In 2008, he was awarded the Otto Bayer Award for his work on the DNA repair systems. In 2008, he became a member of the German Academy of Sciences Leopoldina.

Since 2010, Professor Carell has been an Associate Editor of Chemical Science, the flagship general chemistry journal published by the Royal Society of Chemistry
