= Nancy Goroff =

American organic chemist (born 1968)

Personal details
- Born: Nancy Sarah Goroff; February 18, 1968 (age 58) Chicago, Illinois U.S.
- Party: Democratic
- Education: Harvard University (BS); University of California, Los Angeles (MS, PhD)
- Awards: NSF CAREER Award (2000)
- Scientific career
- Workplaces: Stony Brook University; University of Michigan; Michigan State University
- Thesis: Cyclocarbons, Fullerenes, and Polyyne Rods: An Investigation of the Chemistry of All-Carbon and Carbon-Rich Molecules (1994)
- Doctoral advisor: Orville Chapman; François Diederich

Nancy Sarah Goroff (born February 18, 1968) is an American organic chemist who formerly served as chair of the chemistry department at Stony Brook University. Her research investigates conjugated organic molecules, including polymers, halocarbons and buckyballs. During the 2020 United States elections Goroff ran to represent New York's 1st congressional district, and was defeated by the incumbent, Lee Zeldin.

== Early life and education ==
Goroff studied chemistry at Harvard University. She moved to the West Coast for her graduate studies, where she joined University of California, Los Angeles, and worked under the supervision of Orville L. Chapman and François Diederich.

== Scientific career ==
Goroff was an National Science Foundation (NSF) postdoctoral fellow at the Michigan State University, where she worked in the laboratory of James (Ned) Jackson. At MSU she worked on the synthesis and study of carbenes. Goroff continued her postdoctoral studies at the University of Michigan, studying chemical education with Brian Coppola.

In 1997 Goroff joined the faculty of Stony Brook University. The Goroff laboratory designs conjugated organic molecules, including polymers, halocarbons and buckybelts. Among these, Goroff is interested in organoiodine compounds (including iodoalkynes) and halogenated cumulenes. She has investigated the chemical, material and photophysical properties of poly(diiododiacetylene), a polymer known as PIDA. Goroff has shown that suspending solutions of PIDA in pyrrolidine results in the formation of a highly conductive material. Conjugated molecular belts, where the deconjugated π-system is shaped into a cylinder. The belts are not dissimilar to buckminsterfullerene, a spherical carbon allotrope, but has open edges that can be functionalised further. These belts have potential for nanoscale switches.

In 2013 Goroff was appointed the Associate Provost for the Integration of Research at Stony Brook University.

Goroff is a member of the Union of Concerned Scientists.

== Political career ==
In 2020 Goroff ran for the 2020 United States House of Representatives, going on leave from her faculty position at Stony Brook University. On June 23 she won the Democratic primary, with 36.1 percent of the vote, finishing ahead of 2018 nominee Perry Gershon. In November, she faced incumbent Lee Zeldin in the general election, losing by 9.8%. If elected, Goroff would have been the first woman scientist with a PhD to be elected to Congress.

== Electoral history ==
2020 Democratic primary, New York's 1st congressional district
Party	Candidate	Votes	%
Democratic	Nancy Goroff	17,970	36.1
Democratic	Perry Gershon	17,303	34.8
Democratic	Bridget Fleming	13,718	27.6
Democratic	Gregory-John Fischer	775	1.5
Total votes		49,766	100.0

New York's 1st congressional district, 2020
Party	Candidate	Votes	%
Republican	Lee Zeldin	180,855	48.2
Conservative	Lee Zeldin	21,611	5.8
Independence	Lee Zeldin	3,249	0.9
Total	Lee Zeldin (incumbent)	205,715	54.9
Democratic	Nancy Goroff	160,978	42.9
Working Families	Nancy Goroff	8,316	2.2
Total	Nancy Goroff	169,294	45.1
Total votes		375,009	100.0
Republican hold			

== Awards and honors ==
- 2000 National Science Foundation CAREER Award
- 2003 Thieme Award
- 2011 Stony Brook University Award for Excellence in Service
- 2013 American Chemical Society Award for Creative Research and Applications of Iodine Chemistry

== Selected publications ==
- Sun, Aiwu; Lauher, Joseph W.; Goroff, Nancy S. (2006-05-19). "Preparation of Poly(diiododiacetylene), an Ordered Conjugated Polymer of Carbon and Iodine". Science. 312 (5776): 1030–1034. Bibcode:2006Sci...312.1030S. doi:10.1126/science.1124621. ISSN 0036-8075. PMID 16709780. S2CID 36045120.
- Kishimoto, Haruo; Yoshinaga, Masashi; Yamaji, Katsuhiko; Brito, Manuel; Horita, Teruhisa; Yokokawa, Harumi (2009). "Phase Transformation of ScSZ by Reduction of NiO-ScSZ Mixture". ECS Meeting Abstracts (12): 1405. doi:10.1149/ma2009-02/12/1405. ISSN 2151-2043.
- Goroff, Nancy S. (1996-02-13). "Mechanism of Fullerene Formation". Accounts of Chemical Research. 29 (2): 77–83. doi:10.1021/ar950162d. ISSN 0001-4842.
