= Asymmetric counteranion directed catalysis =

Catalysis in enantioselective synthesis

Asymmetric counteranion directed catalysis (ACDC) or chiral anion catalysis in enantioselective synthesis is the "induction of enantioselectivity in a reaction proceeding through a cationic intermediate by means of ion pairing with a chiral, enantiomerically pure anion provided by the catalyst". Although chiral Brønsted acid catalyzed reactions may well fall into this category of catalysis under the definition given here (e.g., protonation of an imine by a chiral phosphoric acid), the extent of proton transfer and the demarcation between hydrogen bonding and full proton transfer is often ambiguous. Hence, some authors may exclude ion pair formation by proton transfer as a type of chiral counteranion catalysis. The discussion below will focus on chiral ion pairs generated through means other than proton transfer. (For a discussion about chiral Brønsted acid catalyzed reactions, see the article on hydrogen bond catalysis.)

The concept of utilizing the counteranion as the source of chirality in catalysis was first proposed by Arndtsen and coworkers in 2000, who applied chiral borate anions to copper-catalyzed olefin aziridination and cyclopropanation. The enantioselectivities observed were low: <10% ee in cases where the chiral borate was the only source of chirality. However, the observation that enantioinduction occurred only in nonpolar solvents supports the proposed role of the borate as the chiral counteranion.

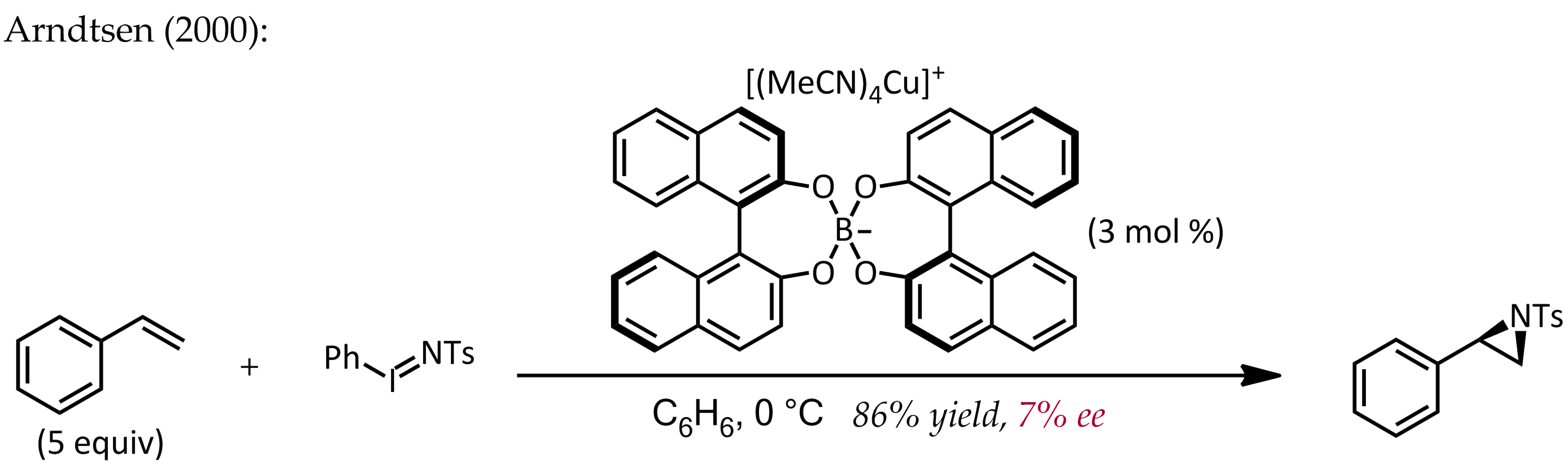

The term asymmetric counteranion-directed catalysis was coined in 2006 by List in the context of organocatalytic iminium reduction in the presence of a chiral phosphate anion:

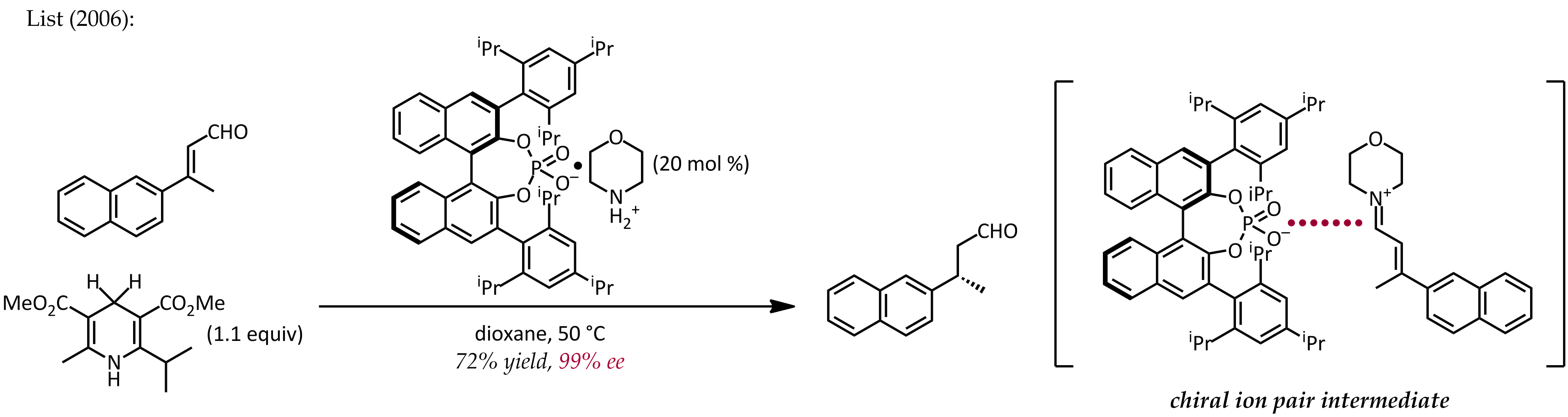

Chiral anions have been combined with homogeneous catalysts, illustrated by chiral phosphate anions for intramolecular allene hydrofunctionalization reactions catalyzed by phosphinegold(I) complexes:

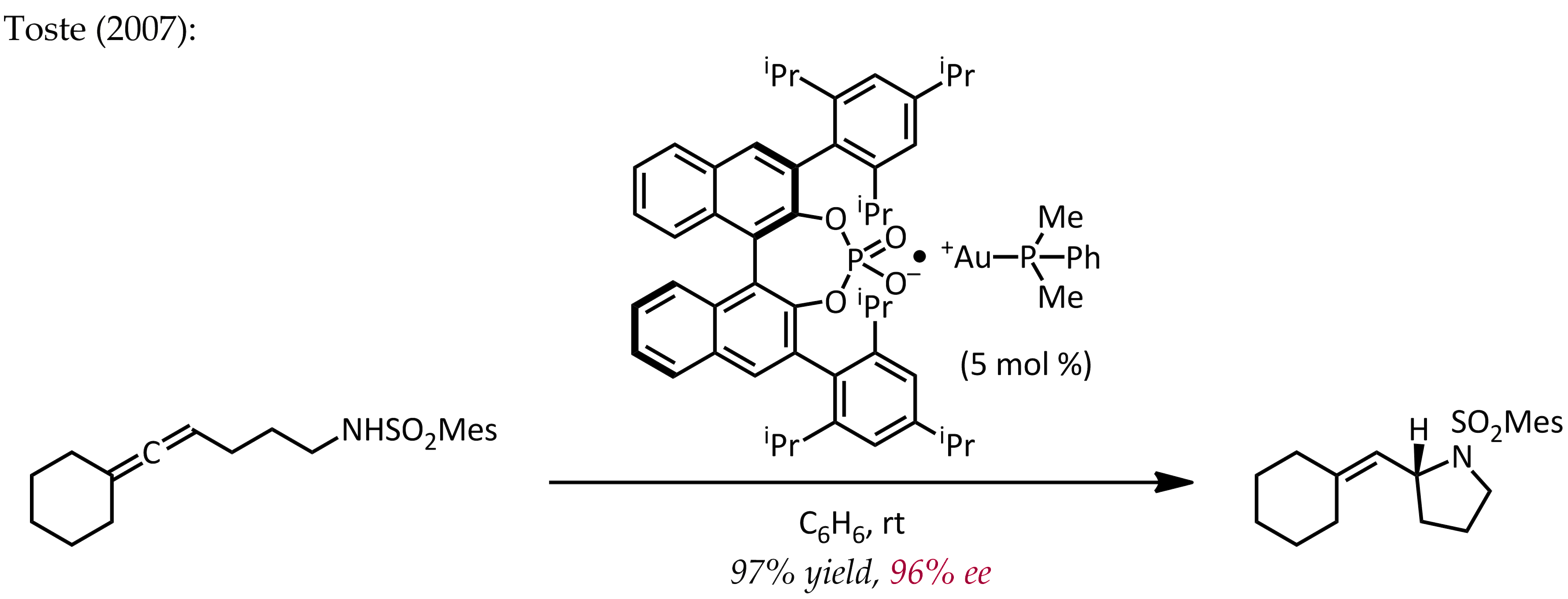

Subsequently, Toste and coworkers advanced the concept of chiral anion phase transfer catalysis, in which phase segregation (solid/organic or aqueous/organic) is used as a tactic to enforce the pairing of a cationic reagent or intermediate with a chiral counteranion. In the example below, the fluorinating reagent Selectfluor exhibits extremely limited solubility in nonpolar solvents and is therefore unreactive as an insoluble bulk solid. Exchange of its tetrafluoroborate anions with two equivalents of a chiral, lipophilic phosphate anion brings the reagent into solution as an ion-triplet which behaves as a source of chiral "F^{+}":

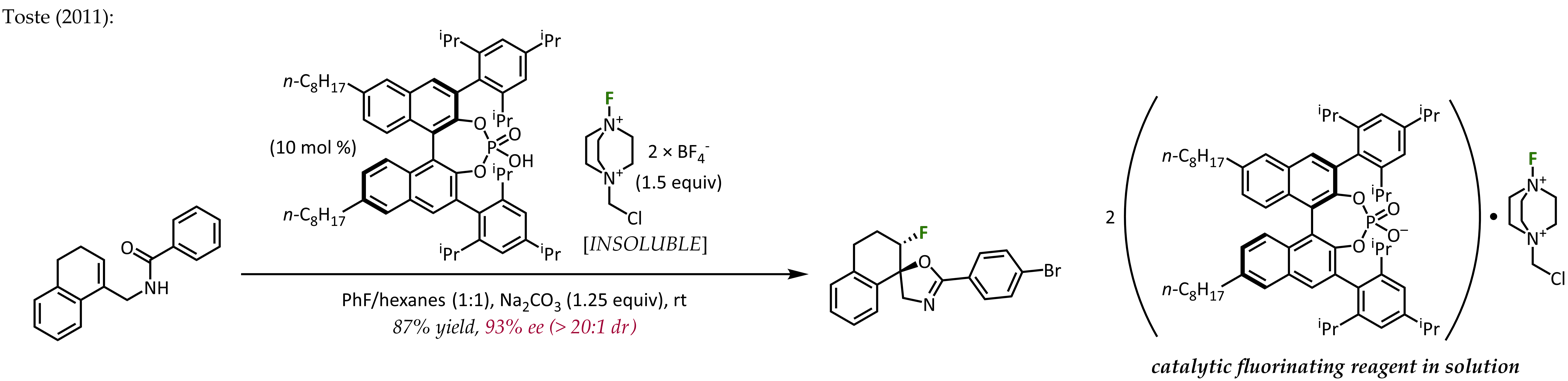
