= Zoltan Hajos =

Hungarian organic chemist (1926–2022)

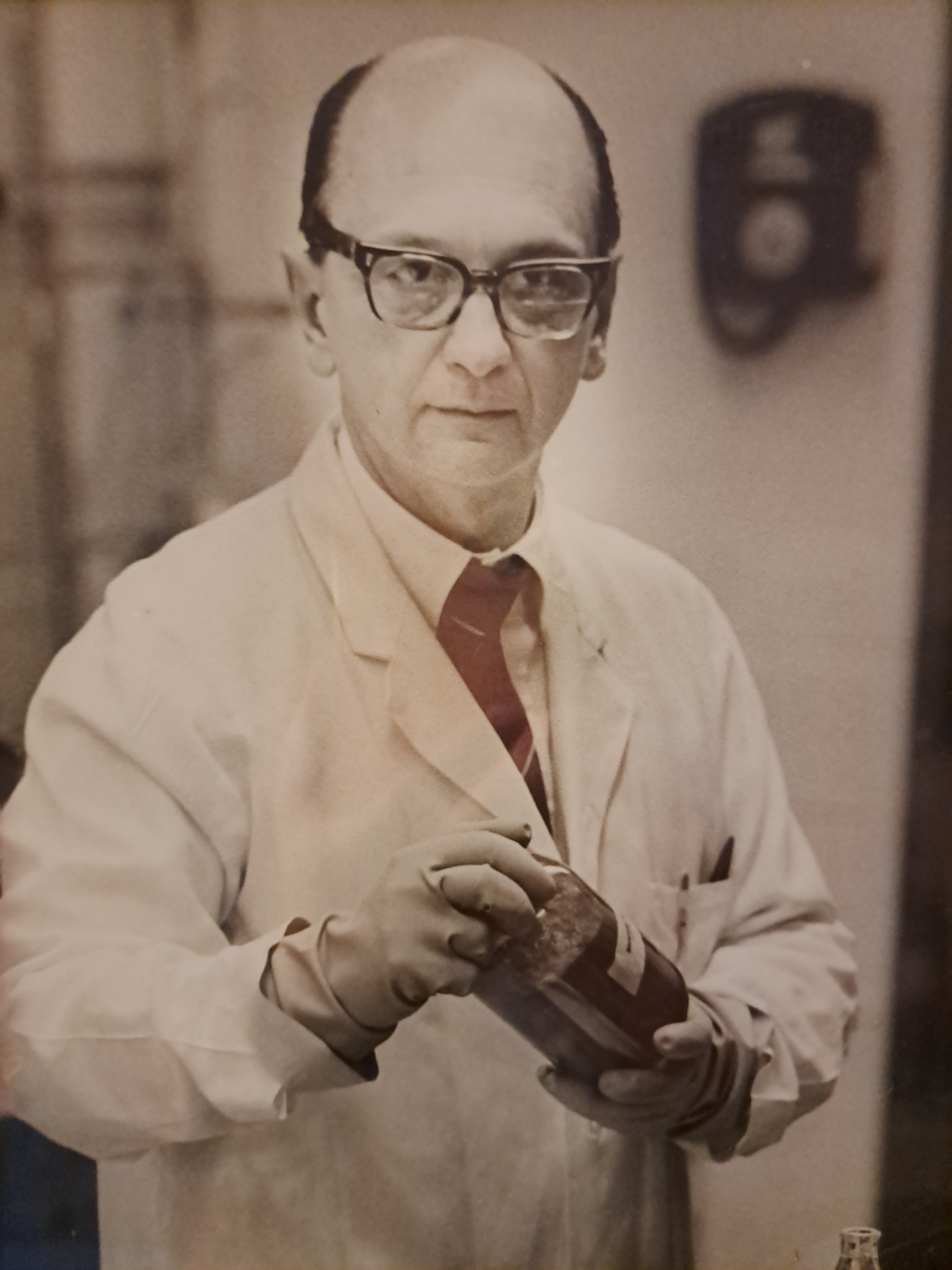
- Born: Zoltán György Hajós; 3 March 1926; Budapest, Kingdom of Hungary
- Died: 9 October 2022 (aged 96); Budapest, Hungary
- Education: Technical University of Budapest
- Known for: Organocatalysis, total synthesis of steroids
- Scientific career
- Fields: Organic chemistry
- Workplaces: Hoffmann-La Roche, Johnson & Johnson
- Doctoral advisor: Zoltán Csűrös

Zoltan George Hajos (born Zoltán György Hajós; 3 March 1926 – 9 October 2022) was a Hungarian-American organic chemist. Originally an academic in his native Budapest, then an industrial chemist in the pharmaceutical industry, he is known for the Hajos–Parrish–Eder–Sauer–Wiechert reaction (originally named Hajos-Parrish reaction by Claude Agami in 1985).

== Biography ==
=== Chemistry training ===
Hajos studied chemistry at the Technical University of Budapest (TU Budapest), in Hungary, completing an M.Sc. in 1947, and his doctoral work under Zoltan Csuros of the Institute of Organic Chemical Technology in 1950.

=== Early academic career ===
Hajos remained there until accepting a position as assistant professor in organic chemistry at the TU Budapest in 1948, where he stayed until 1957. With backlash following the 1956 Revolution in October, 1956, Hajos left TU Budapest and communist Hungary for the United States, where he took a position as a research associate in organic chemistry, a senior postdoctoral-level position, in the Department of Chemistry at Princeton University, beginning in 1957.

=== Second academic and pharmaceutical periods ===
Hajos accepted a chemistry position with the Pharmaceutical Research Institute of Hoffmann-La Roche, a pharmaceutical company, in Nutley, New Jersey, in 1960. He remained in that position until beginning a second phase of an academic career in 1970, first in the Chemistry Department of the University of Vermont (1972–1973), and thereafter on the Faculty of Pharmacy of the University of Toronto (1973–1974). Hajos returned to the pharmaceutical industry in 1975, proceeding through a series of positions at the Research Institute of Johnson & Johnson, until retiring in 1990.

== Research ==
=== Hajos–Parrish–Eder–Sauer–Wiechert reaction, discovery and importance ===
Front page of the German Patent Application no. 21 02 623, published July 29, 1971

Hajos is noted for the Hajos–Parrish–Eder–Sauer–Wiechert reaction, and of the related (S)-proline-catalyzed synthesis route to the Hajos-Wiechert ketone, and is considered a pioneer in the research area of organocatalysis. In a recent review of the Hajos–Parrish–Eder–Sauer–Wiechert reaction as a name reaction, Daniel Zerong Wang describes it, and its synonyms, thus:

"This reaction was independently reported by two groups in 1971: the group of Hajos and Parrish [citing a German patent dated 29 July 1971] and the group of Eder, Sauer, and Wiechert [citing a German patent dated October 7, 1971, and a 1971 journal report in German and English translation]. It is an enantioselective [a]ldol [r]eaction catalyzed by (S)-proline… [and is] one of the earliest enantioselectively catalyzed reactions of practical use in synthetic organic chemistry. Owing to its wide application in organic synthesis, it has been extensively explored and extended to asymmetric [a]ldol... α-alkylation… Mannich... Michael [a]ddition... and α-amination… [reactions] of carbonyl compounds. In the literature, this reaction has been referred to by different names: [as the Hajos–Parrish–Eder–Sauer–Wiechert reaction]... Hajos-Eder-Sauer-Wiechert... Hajos-Wiechert... and Hajos-Parrish-Wiechert reactions."

Nobel Prize laureate in Chemistry 2021 Benjamin List, a leader in the modern field of organocatalysis, describes the importance of the discovery of the Hajos–Parrish–Eder–Sauer–Wiechert reaction thus:

"Discovered in the early 1970s, the Hajos–Parrish–Eder–Sauer–Wiechert reaction, a proline-catalyzed intramolecular aldol reaction [citing journal articles Hajos & Parrish (1974a) and Eder, Sauer & Wiechert (1971b)], represents not only the first asymmetric aldol reaction invented by chemists but also the first highly enantioselective organocatalytic transformation.

== Personal life and death ==
Hajos died in Budapest on 9 October 2022, at the age of 96.

== Awards and recognition ==
Hajos received a Certificate of Merit, an Iron Award, from TU Budapest in May 2013, in recognition of 65 years of professional service.

Hajos received a Certificate of Merit, a Ruby Award, from TU Budapest in 2017, in recognition of 70 years of professional service.

Hajos received a Certificate of Merit, a Platinum Award, from TU Budapest in 2022, in recognition of 75 years of professional service.

== Selected publications ==
- Malathi, R.; Rajagopal, D.; Hajos, Zoltan G.; Swaminathan, S. (2004). "Proline-catalysed asymmetric ketol cyclizations: The template mechanism revisited". Journal of Chemical Sciences. 116 (3). Springer Science and Business Media LLC: 159–162. doi:10.1007/bf02708219. ISSN 0253-4134. S2CID 96563949.
- Hajos, Zoltan G.; Parrish, David R. (1974). "Asymmetric synthesis of bicyclic intermediates of natural product chemistry". The Journal of Organic Chemistry. 39 (12). American Chemical Society (ACS): 1615–1621. doi:10.1021/jo00925a003. ISSN 0022-3263.
- Hajos, Zoltan G.; Parrish, David R. (1974). "Synthesis and conversion of 2-methyl-2-(3-oxobutyl)-1,3-cyclopentanedione to the isomeric racemic ketols of the [3.2.1]bicyclooctane and of the perhydroindane series". The Journal of Organic Chemistry. 39 (12). American Chemical Society (ACS): 1612–1615. doi:10.1021/jo00925a002. ISSN 0022-3263.
- "( + )-(7aS)-7a-METHYL-2,3,7,7a-TETRAHYDRO-1 H-INDENE-1,5-(6H-DIONE". Organic Syntheses. 63: 26. 1985. doi:10.15227/orgsyn.063.0026. ISSN 0078-6209.
- Kendall, Edward C.; Hajos, Zoltan G. (1960). "Tetrahydro-3,4-Furandione. I. Preparation and Properties". Journal of the American Chemical Society. 82 (12). American Chemical Society (ACS): 3219–3220. doi:10.1021/ja01497a059. ISSN 0002-7863.
- Micheli, Robert A.; Hojos, Zoltan G.; Cohen, Noal; Parrish, David R.; Portland, Louis A.; Sciamanna, Werner; Scott, Melinda A.; Wehrli, Pius A. (21 March 1975). "Total syntheses of optically active 19-nor steroids. (+)-Estr-4-ene-3,17-dione and (+)-13.beta.-ethylgon-4-ene-3,17-dione". The Journal of Organic Chemistry. 40 (6). American Chemical Society (ACS): 675–681. doi:10.1021/jo00894a003. ISSN 0022-3263. PMID 1133631.
- Press, Jeffery B.; Falotico, Robert; Hajos, Zoltan G.; Sawyers, Rebecca Anne; Kanojia, Ramesh M.; Williams, Louella; Haertlein, Barbara; Kauffman, Jack A.; Lakas-Weiss, Constance; Salata, Joseph J. (1992). "Synthesis and structure-activity relationship of 6-substituted purine derivatives as novel selective positive inotropes". Journal of Medicinal Chemistry. 35 (24). American Chemical Society (ACS): 4509–4515. doi:10.1021/jm00102a001. ISSN 0022-2623. PMID 1335073.
