= Zarghun railway station =

Railway station in Pakistan

Zarghun Railway Station

General information
- Owner: Ministry of Railways
- Line: Zhob Valley Railway

Other information
- Station code: ZGH

History
- Former names: Great Indian Peninsula Railway

Zarghun Railway Station (Urdu: زرغون ریلوے اسٹیشن) is located in Pakistan. It is one of 14 stations along the Zhob Valley Railway line.

== See also ==
- List of railway stations in Pakistan
- Pakistan Railways
