= François Diederich =

Luxembourgish chemist (1952–2020)

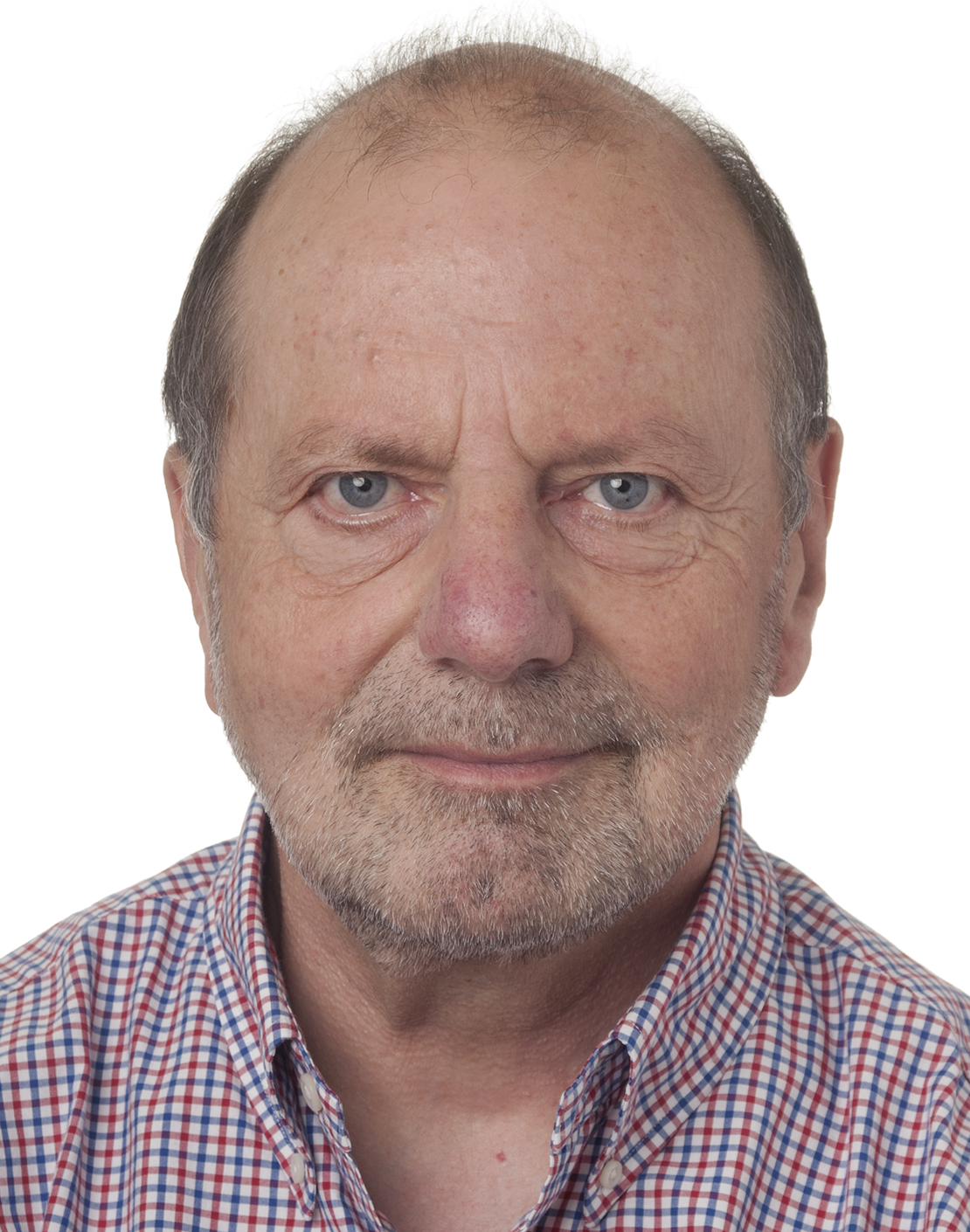
- Diederich in 2016
- Born: 9 July 1952; Ettelbruck, Luxembourg
- Died: 23 September 2020 (aged 68)
- Education: Heidelberg University
- Scientific career
- Workplaces: ETH Zurich; University of California, Los Angeles
- Doctoral students: Nancy Goroff; Anna Hirsch
- Website: www.diederich.chem.ethz.ch

François Diederich (9 July 1952 – 23 September 2020) was a Luxembourgish chemist specializing in organic chemistry.

== Education ==
He obtained both his diploma and PhD (first synthesis of Kekulene) from the University of Heidelberg in 1977 and 1979, respectively.

== Career and research ==
After postdoctoral studies with Orville L. Chapman at the University of California, Los Angeles (UCLA) and habilitation at the Max Planck Institute for Medical Research in Heidelberg, he became Full Professor of Organic and Bioorganic Chemistry at UCLA in 1989. In 1992 he was appointed Professor of Organic Chemistry at ETH Zurich. He retired on 31 July 2017, and remained a research-active professor at ETH Zurich. On 16 March 2019, the German Chemical Society (Gesellschaft Deutscher Chemiker, GDCh) bestowed him with their highest recognition, Honorary Membership.

Diederich died on 23 September 2020 after a battle with cancer.

His research interests cover a wide range of topics:

- Molecular recognition in chemistry and biology.
- Modern medicinal chemistry: molecular recognition studies with biological receptors and X-ray structure-based design of nonpeptidic enzyme inhibitors. Examples of targets: plasmepsin II, IspE and IspF in the non-mevalonate pathway of isoprenoid biosynthesis (malaria); t-RNA guanine transglycosylase (shigellosis); trypanothione reductase (African sleeping sickness).
- Supramolecular nanosystems and nano-patterned surfaces.
- Advanced materials based on carbon-rich acetylenic molecular architecture: new organic super-acceptors and their inter- and intramolecular charge-transfer complexes, opto-electronic materials for molecular electronic circuitry, chiral macrocyclic and acyclic alleno-acetylenes, amplification of chirality and its transfer from the molecular to the macroscopic scale.

== Honors and awards ==
- Otto Hahn Medal of the Max Planck Society (1979)
- Dreyfus Teacher Scholar Award (1987)
- ACS Arthur C. Cope Scholar Award (1992)
- Otto Bayer Award (1993)
- Janssen Prize for Creativity in Organic Synthesis (2000)
- Havinga Medal (2000)
- Myron L. Bender & Muriel S. Bender Distinguished Summer Lecturer at Northwestern University (2004)
- Humboldt Prize (2005)
- Burckhardt Helferich Prize (2005)
- August Wilhelm von Hofmann-Denkmünze of the German Chemical Society (2006)
- ACS Ronald Breslow Award for Achievements in Biomimetic Chemistry (2007)
- Adolf-von-Baeyer-Denkmünze of the German Chemical Society (2011)
- Honorary Doctoral Degree, Technion, Haifa (2012)
- Ernst Hellmut Vits-Preis (2014)
- Prix Paul Metz by the Institut Grand Ducal, Luxembourg (2014)
- EFMC Nauta Award for Pharmacochemistry and for outstanding results of scientific research in the field of Medicinal Chemistry (2016)
- Honorary Membership of the German Chemical Society (Gesellschaft Deutscher Chemiker, GDCh) (2019)

== Memberships in scientific academies ==
- Deutsche Akademie der Naturforscher Leopoldina
- Berlin-Brandenburgische Akademie der Wissenschaften
- American Academy of Arts and Sciences (Foreign Honorary Member)
- Real Academia de Ciencias Exactas, Físicas y Naturales (Spain, foreign member)
- US National Academy of Sciences (Foreign Associate)

== Books ==
- Diederich, François; Stang, Peter J.; Tykwinski, R. R. (2008). Modern supramolecular chemistry : strategies for macrocycle synthesis. Weinheim: Wiley-VCH. ISBN 978-3-527-31826-1. OCLC 166378356.
- Diederich, François; Stang, Peter J.; Tykwinski, R. R. (2005). Acetylene Chemistry : chemistry, biology and material science. Weinheim: Wiley-VCH. ISBN 3-527-30781-8. OCLC 85820648.
- Meijere, A. de; Diederich, François (2004). Metal-catalyzed cross-coupling reactions. Weinheim: Wiley-VCH. ISBN 3-527-30518-1. OCLC 56439681.
- Diederich, François; Stang, Peter J. (2000). Templated organic synthesis. Weinheim: Wiley-VCH. ISBN 3-527-29666-2. OCLC 42620646.
- Diederich, François; Künzer, H. (1998). Recent trends in molecular recognition. Berlin: Springer. ISBN 978-3-662-03574-0. OCLC 743291450.
- Stang, Peter J.; Diederich, François (1995). Modern acetylene chemistry. Weinheim: VCH. ISBN 3-527-29084-2. OCLC 34027354.
