= Ferdi Schüth =

German chemist (born 1960)

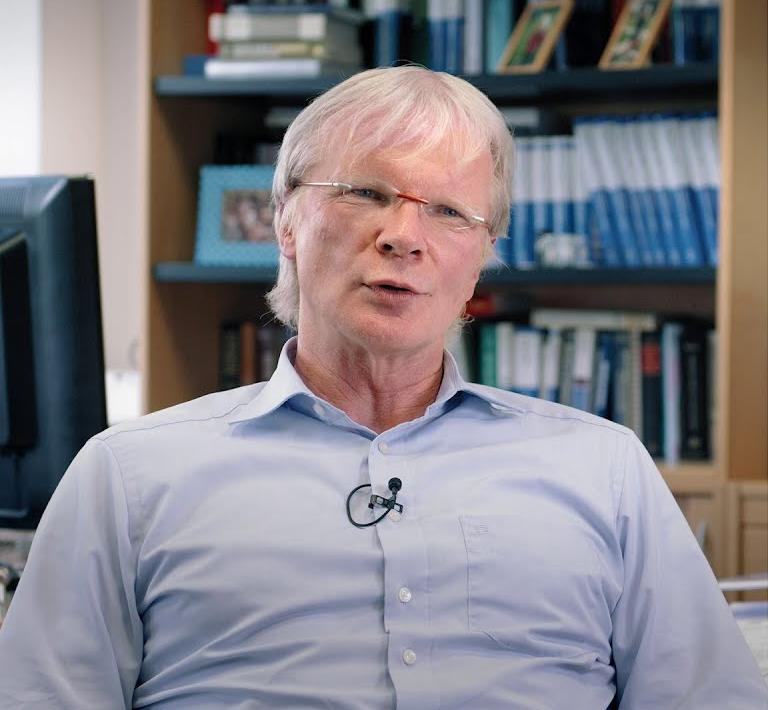
Schüth in 2020

Ferdi Schüth (Ferdi Schueth) is a German chemist.

He was born 8 July 1960 in Allagen/Warstein.

He studied chemistry at the University of Münster from 1978 till 1984 and law from 1983 till 1988. After finishing his Ph.D. thesis on inorganic chemistry at the University of Münster in 1988 he did a postdoctoral studies in the University of Minnesota in Minneapolis. He did his habilitation in 1995 at the University of Mainz. After being professor for inorganic chemistry at the University of Frankfurt am Main from 1995 till 1998 he became director at the Max Planck Institute für Kohlenforschung Mülheim/Ruhr.

In 2003, he received the Gottfried Wilhelm Leibniz Prize of the Deutsche Forschungsgemeinschaft, which is the highest honour awarded in German research.

In July 2007, he was elected vice-president of the Deutsche Forschungsgemeinschaft (German Research Foundation).

He is a member on the Board of Trustees of ESYS – Energy Systems of the Future, a joint initiative of acatech, Leopoldina and the Union of Academies.
