= Synlett =

- Discipline: Chemistry
- Language: English

Publication details
- History: 1989 to present
- Publisher: Georg Thieme Verlag KG (Germany)
- Impact factor: 1.7 (2023)

Standard abbreviations
- ISO 4: Synlett

Indexing
- ISSN: 0936-5214 (print); 1437-2096 (web)

Links
- Journal homepage

Synlett is an international scientific journal for accounts and rapid communications of original contributions of fundamental research in synthetic organic chemistry. The impact factor of this journal is 2.419 (2017). Nature featured a brief piece by the editor-in-chief of the journal in 2017, Benjamin List, where he discussed the journal's experience with the non-traditional peer review system.
