= International Journal of Mass Spectrometry =

- Discipline: Mass spectrometry
- Language: English
- Edited by: Julia Laskin, Zheng Ouyang

Publication details
- Former name(s): International Journal of Mass Spectrometry and Ion Physics; International Journal of Mass Spectrometry and Ion Processes
- History: 1968-present
- Publisher: Elsevier
- Frequency: Monthly
- Open access: Hybrid
- Impact factor: 1.986 (2020)

Standard abbreviations
- ISO 4: Int. J. Mass Spectrom.

Indexing
- International Journal of Mass Spectrometry
- CODEN: IMSPF8
- ISSN: 1387-3806
- LCCN: 98657343
- OCLC no.: 52299627
- International Journal of Mass Spectrometry and Ion Processes
- ISSN: 0168-1176
- International Journal of Mass Spectrometry and Ion Physics
- ISSN: 0020-7381

Links
- Journal homepage; Online archive; International Journal of Mass Spectrometry and Ion Processes online archive; International Journal of Mass Spectrometry and Ion Physics online archive

The International Journal of Mass Spectrometry is a monthly peer-reviewed scientific journal covering all aspects of mass spectrometry, including instrumentation and applications in biology, chemistry, geology, and physics. It was established in 1968 as the International Journal of Mass Spectrometry and Ion Physics and was renamed International Journal of Mass Spectrometry and Ion Processes in 1983, before obtaining its current title in 1998. It is published by Elsevier and the editors-in-chief are Julia Laskin (Purdue University) and Zheng Ouyang (Tsinghua University).

== Abstracting and indexing ==
The journal is abstracted and indexed in:

- Chemical Abstracts Service
- Current Contents/Physical, Chemical & Earth Sciences
- EBSCO databases
- Embase
- Food Science and Technology Abstracts
- FRANCIS
- Inspec
- PASCAL
- Science Citation Index Expanded
- Scopus

According to the Journal Citation Reports, the journal has a 2020 impact factor of 1.986.
