= Richard Lerner =

American research chemist (1938–2021)

- Born: August 26, 1938; Chicago, Illinois, U.S.
- Died: December 2, 2021 (aged 83); La Jolla, California, U.S.
- Education: Stanford Medical School and Northwestern University
- Awards: Wolf Prize in Chemistry (1994); William B. Coley Award (1999); Paul Ehrlich and Ludwig Darmstaedter Prize (2003); Prince of Asturias Award (2012)
- Scientific career
- Fields: Chemistry
- Workplaces: The Scripps Research Institute; Wistar Institute

Richard Alan Lerner (August 26, 1938 – December 2, 2021) was an American research chemist. He was best known for his work on catalytic antibodies and combinatorial antibody libraries. Lerner served as President of The Scripps Research Institute (TSRI) from 1987 until January 1, 2012, and was a member of its Skaggs Institute for Chemical Biology, in La Jolla, California.

== Biography ==
Lerner grew up on the South Side of Chicago and excelled at chemistry and wrestling as a schoolboy. He attended Hirsch High School. After attending Northwestern University as an undergraduate, Lerner obtained an MD from Stanford Medical School in 1964, then undertook postdoctoral training at Scripps Clinic and Research Foundation, an early incarnation of the institute he would eventually lead. In the 1970s Lerner carried out research at the Wistar Institute in Philadelphia then returned to La Jolla to the now renamed Research Institute of Scripps Clinic. In 1982 he was appointed chairman of the Department of Molecular Biology, then five years later assumed the directorship. In 1991, when the TSRI was established as a nonprofit entity, Lerner became its first president.

Lerner's research into catalytic antibodies provided a method of catalyzing chemical reactions thought impossible using classical techniques. He was one of the pioneers in developing the field of combinatorial libraries, and in 1992, together with Sydney Brenner, he published a seminal paper launching the field of DNA-encoded libraries. In addition, Lerner has led extensive studies into protein structure, characterised cis-9,10-octadecenoamide, a novel lipid hormone that induces sleep, and provided the first evidence of a role for ozone in human disease. In 1967 Lerner discovered the role of anti-GBM antibodies in the pathogenesis of Goodpasture's disease. As of 2007, Lerner's résumé listed 67 patents and 403 published scientific papers.

Lerner was the Lita Annenberg Hazen Professor of Immunochemistry and Cecil H. and Ida M. Green Chair in Chemistry. He has been the recipient of over 29 honors and prizes. These include the Parke-Davis Award in 1978, the San Marino Prize in 1990, the Wolf Prize in Chemistry for 1994 (with Peter Schultz) and Humboldt Research Award in 1994. He was the Myron L. Bender and Muriel S. Bender Summer Lecturer at Northwestern University in 1994 as well. Richard Lerner was awarded the California Scientist of the Year Award in 1996 and the University of California Presidential Medal in 2002. He has also been elected to the Royal Swedish Academy of Sciences and the United States National Academy of Sciences (1991). In 2010 he was awarded an honorary degree from the University of Warwick to add to those he received from Technion – Israel Institute of Technology in 2001, Ben-Gurion University of the Negev in 2003 and Florida Atlantic University in 2004 and University of Oxford in 2007. Richard Lerner shared the 2012 Prince of Asturias Award (now called the Princess of Asturias Award, which is often called the Spanish Nobel Prize, with Sir Gregory Winter for Professor Pieczenik's conception and their development of combinatorial antibody libraries.

Under Lerner's leadership, The Scripps Research Institute grew threefold in terms of laboratory space and more than quadrupled its staff levels, making it among the largest nonprofit biomedical research organizations in the world. He also oversaw the establishment of a sister research campus, called Scripps Florida, in Palm Beach County. In 2006, Lerner announced that he intended to "return to full-time research in [his] laboratory" in five years. In 2011 it was announced that Lerner's replacement as Scripps President would be Michael Marletta. Lerner officially stepped down on January 1, 2012, having led the Institute for 25 years.

When he was Scripps Research Institute president, in 2005 Lerner's salary was US$1,212,071, placing among the top ten percent of nonprofit executives in the USA. Lerner also served on the boards of six for-profit and nonprofit companies, including Kraft Foods, advised four other companies and two venture capital funds. He has declined to reveal the sum of his earnings, but acknowledged he earned $8.5 million for his part in the discovery of Humira.

Lerner's entrepreneurial activities have drawn comment. A consumer advocacy organization, Public Citizen, claimed it constitutes "a conflict of interest" while acknowledging there is "nothing illegal" in his multiple activities. Donald Kennedy described Lerner's numerous commitments as "unusually rich array... But if he can manage them fairly, then I can't make a particular criticism of it." Lerner's contract with TSRI stipulates he spends no more than 10% of his time on outside activities, however, and he says the actual amount is "far less." Lerner has also published a novel called Epidemic 9 (ISBN 068803585X) about, according to the St. Petersburg Times, "a young scientific investigator who swears off wealth and status in favor of public service work".

Lerner married Nicola Green Lerner, a physician, in 1981. He has three adult children; Danica, Arik and Aaron by a previous marriage to Diana Pickett, a psychotherapist.

The Nobel laureate in chemistry Benjamin List started his career as a protegé of Lerner.

Lerner died on December 2, 2021, at the age of 83 in his home in La Jolla.
