= Johann Mulzer =

German chemist (born 1944)

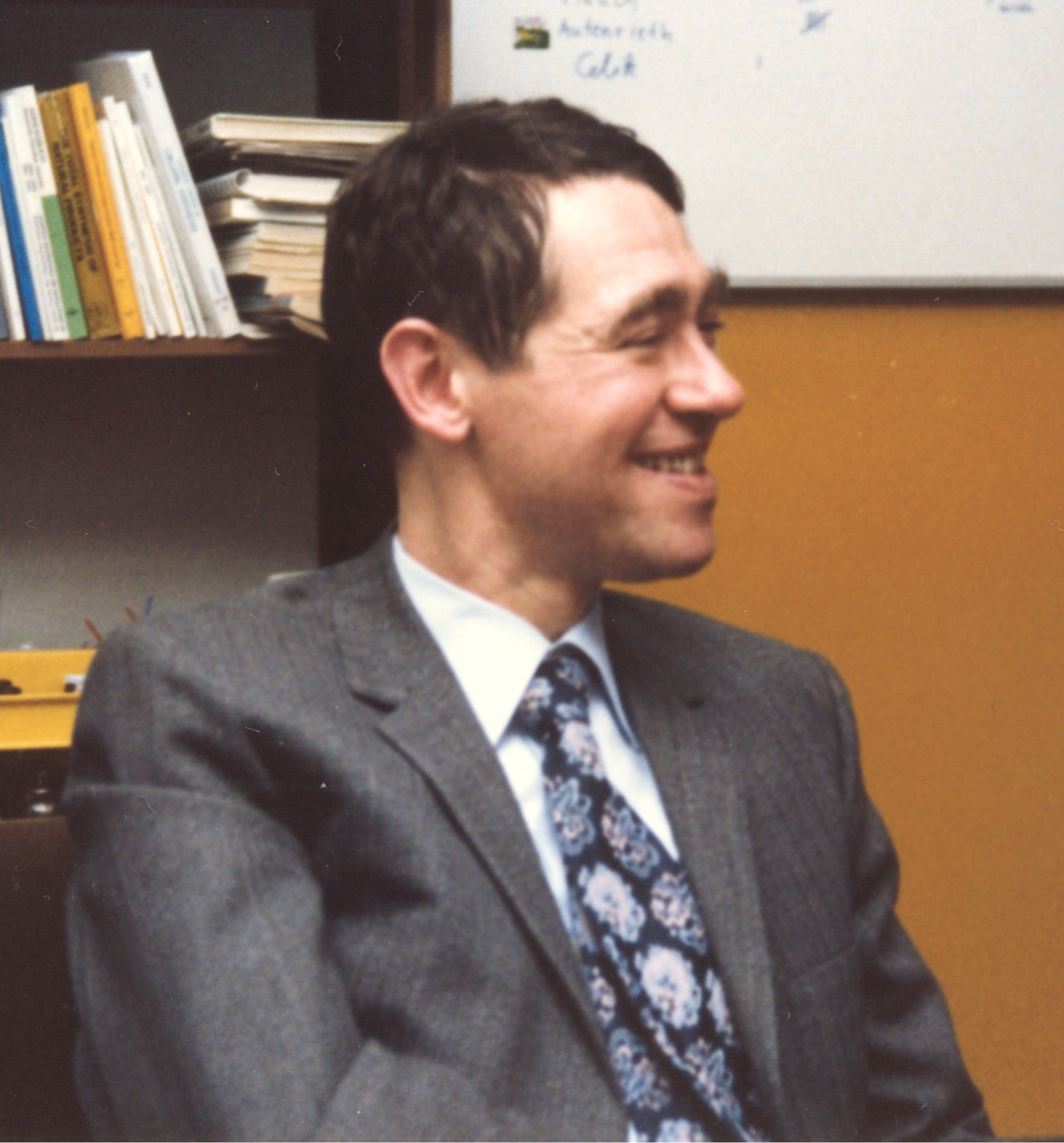
- Mulzer in 1985
- Born: 5 August 1944 (age 82); Prien, Germany
- Education: LMU Munich
- Awards: Gottfried Wilhelm Leibniz Prize 1994
- Scientific career
- Fields: Organic chemistry
- Workplaces: Heinrich Heine University Düsseldorf 1982–1984; Free University of Berlin 1984–1995; Goethe University Frankfurt 1995–1996; University of Vienna 1996–2012
- Doctoral advisor: Rolf Huisgen

Johann Hermann Wolfgang Mulzer is a German organic chemist, best known for his work in total synthesis. From 1996 to 2012, he was a professor of chemistry at the University of Vienna.

== Awards ==
- 1994 Gottfried Wilhelm Leibniz Prize
- 1997 Ernst Schering Prize
- 2010 Emil Fischer Medal.
