= Alois Fürstner =

Austrian chemist

- Born: 23 July 1962 (age 63)
- Citizenship: Austria
- Awards: Leibniz Prize (1999); Centenary Prize (2004); Otto Bayer Prize (2006); Heinrich Wieland Prize (2006); Janssen Prize (2008); Ziegler Award (2013); Gay-Lussac Humboldt Prize (2013)
- Scientific career
- Fields: Organic chemistry
- Institutions: Max Planck Institute for Coal Research

Alois Fürstner (born 23 July 1962) is an Austrian chemist. He is director of Organometallic Chemistry at the Max Planck Institute for Coal Research in Mülheim, Germany.

He has been awarded the Leibniz Prize (1999), the Royal Society of Chemistry's Centenary Prize (2004), the Heinrich Wieland Prize (2006), the Otto Bayer Award (2006), the Janssen Prize for Creativity in Organic Synthesis (2008), the Karl Ziegler Prize (2013), and the Gay-Lussac Humboldt Prize (2013). He was elected a member of the German Academy of Sciences Leopoldina in 2002.
