= Max Planck Institute for Coal Research =

Research institute in Mülheim an der Ruhr, Germany

Coordinates: 51°25′4″N 6°53′11″E

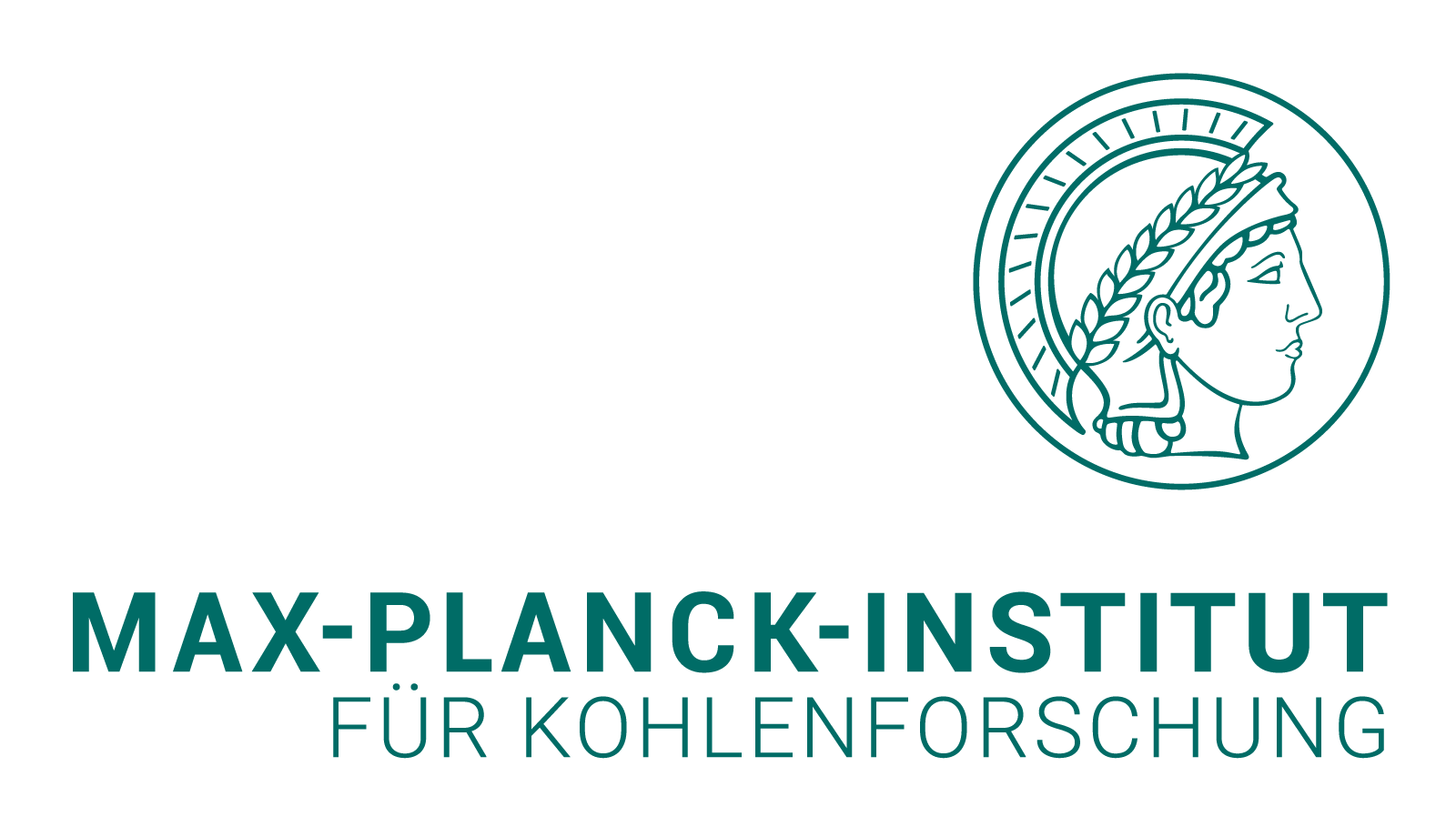
- Official logo
- Abbreviation: MPI KoFo
- Predecessor: Kaiser Wilhelm Institute for Coal Research
- Formation: 1912; 114 years ago
- Type: Scientific institute
- Purpose: Research on organic and organometallic chemistry, catalysis and theoretical chemistry
- Headquarters: Mülheim an der Ruhr, North Rhine-Westphalia, Germany
- Key people: Frank Neese, Managing Director; Tobias Ritter, Director; Benjamin List, Director Ferdi Schüth, Director Alois Fürstner, Director
- Parent organization: Max Planck Society
- Website: (in English) www.kofo.mpg.de/en

The Max Planck Institute for Coal Research (German: Max-Planck-Institut für Kohlenforschung, MPI KoFo) is an institute located in Mülheim an der Ruhr, Germany specializing in chemical research on catalysis. It is one of the 86 institutes in the Max Planck Society (Max-Planck-Gesellschaft). It was founded in 1912 in Mülheim an der Ruhr as the Kaiser Wilhelm Institute for Coal Research (Kaiser-Wilhelm-Institut für Kohlenforschung) to study the chemistry and uses of coal, and became an independent Max Planck Institute in 1949.

== Research ==
The Institute carries out basic research in organic and organometallic chemistry, in homogeneous and heterogeneous catalysis as well as in theoretical chemistry. The principal aim is to develop new methods for the selective and environmentally benign preparation of new compounds and materials.

The MPI KoFo has been at the forefront of research in chemistry since its formation. One of these is the development of the Fischer–Tropsch process through the efforts of Franz Fischer and Hans Tropsch in 1925 when the institute was still organized as the Kaiser-Wilhelm-Institut für Kohlenforschung. Nobel Prize laureate Karl Ziegler also worked at the institute alongside his former student Hans-Georg Gellert to discover the aufbau reaction (Aufbaureaktion) or growth reaction among aluminum alkyl compounds.

== Research Departments ==
=== Organic synthesis ===
Research in the Organic Synthesis Department, led by Tobias Ritter, focuses on the development of organic synthesis and novel reaction chemistry. It seeks to discover molecular structure and reactivity that can contribute to interdisciplinary solutions for challenges in science.

=== Homogeneous catalysis ===
The Homogeneous Catalysis Department, led by Nobel Prize laureate Benjamin List, focuses on the development of new catalysis concepts within the areas of organocatalysis, transition metal catalysis, and, to some extent, biocatalysis. Since 1999, the group concentrates on enantioselective organocatalysis as a fundamental approach complementing biocatalysis and transition metal catalysis. They have a profound interest in developing “new reactions”, designing and identifying new principles for the development of organocatalysts, expanding the scope of already developed catalysts such as proline, using organocatalysis in the synthesis of natural products and pharmaceuticals, and also investigating the mechanism by which organocatalysts activate their substrates. Furthermore, in 2005 the department has first conceptualized another approach to asymmetric catalysis, namely Asymmetric Counteranion-Directed Catalysis (ACDC). This idea has not only progressed within the department but also at other institutions around the globe into a general strategy for asymmetric synthesis applied in organocatalysis as well as in transition metal catalysis and Lewis acid catalysis.

=== Heterogeneous catalysis ===
The Heterogeneous Catalysis Department, led by Ferdi Schüth, is concentrated on the synthesis and characterization of inorganic materials with an application focus in heterogeneous catalysis. Especially important are high surface area materials with controlled porosity and nanostructured catalysts. Reactions studied include model reactions, such as carbon monoxide oxidation, and energy relevant conversions, i.e. methane activation, biomass conversion, ammonia decomposition and catalyzed hydrogen storage. This research is supported by studies into the fundamental processes governing solids formation.

=== Organometallic chemistry ===
The Organometallic Chemistry Department, led by Alois Fürstner, is focused on the development and understanding of organometallic reagents and catalysts, as well as on their application to the synthesis of structurally complex targets of biological significance. Particular attention is paid to the development and validation of catalytic methods for Carbon–carbon bond formation. Long-term projects of current interest concern alkene and alkyne metathesis, the development and use of pi-acids (platinum, gold etc.), iron catalysis and cross coupling in general. Moreover, the group is engaged in the development of novel donor ligands, including carbenes and compounds containing formally "zerovalent" carbon atoms. All methods are scrutinized by applications to the total synthesis and "diverted total synthesis" of natural products and pharmaceutically active compounds.

=== Theoretical chemistry ===
The Department of Molecular Theory and Spectroscopy, led by Frank Neese, focuses on theoretical developments that extend the scope of computational methodology, especially for large molecules, and applies theoretical methods to study specific chemical problems, mostly in close cooperation with experimental partners. The activities of the group cover a broad methodological spectrum such as ab initio methods, density functional theory, semiempirical methods and combined quantum mechanical/molecular mechanical methods.
