= Toste =

Toste is a surname. Notable people with this surname include:

- Brandon Toste (born 2002), Canadian figure skater
- F. Dean Toste (born 1971), Portuguese chemist
- Skoglar Toste, legendary Swedish chieftan
- Tony Toste (born 1968), American stock car racing driver
