= Jirō Tsuji =

Japanese chemist (1927–2022)

Jiro Tsuji
- Born: May 11, 1927; Shiga Prefecture, Japan
- Died: April 1, 2022 (aged 94); Kamakura, Japan
- Education: Kyoto University B.S. (1951) Baylor University M.S. (1957) Columbia University Ph.D. (1960)
- Known for: Tsuji–Trost reaction, Tsuji–Wilkinson decarbonylation reaction
- Scientific career
- Fields: Organic Chemistry, Organometallic Chemistry
- Workplaces: Tokyo Institute of Technology
- Thesis: Studies Toward the Total Synthesis of Vitamin D. Synthetic Studies Related to the aconite-arrya Alkaloids
- Doctoral advisor: Gilbert Stork

Jiro Tsuji (May 11, 1927 – April 1, 2022) was a Japanese chemist, notable for his discovery of organometallic reactions, including the Tsuji–Trost reaction, the Tsuji–Wilkinson decarbonylation reaction, and the Tsuji–Wacker reaction.

== Early life and education ==
Tsuji was born in Japan in 1927.

After attending Kyoto University, Tsuji began his doctoral research at Columbia University under Gilbert Stork studying natural product synthesis, and making contributions to research on the dissolving metal reduction of enones.

== Independent career ==
His independent career began at Toyo Rayon (now Toray Industries) studying the stoichiometric, and later catalytic carbonylation of Pd^{II}-alkene complexes with carbon monoxide. His preliminary results showed that acyl halides and aldehydes could be decarbonylated by Pd^{0} at high temperatures (200 °C) yielding alkenes; further investigation revealed that stoichiometric quantities of Wilkinson's catalyst was able to affect the same reaction at lower temperatures, now known as the Tsuji–Wilkinson decarbonylation reaction.

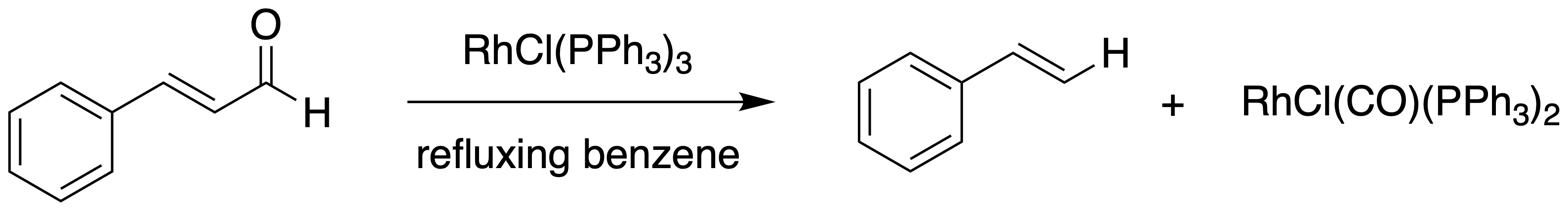
Tsuji's first report of rhodium-mediated decarbonylation.

His pioneering work resulting in the development of the Tsuji–Trost reaction was the discovery that allyl-Pd^{II} complexes react with malonates, acetoacetates, and enamines yielding alpha-allylated carbonyl compounds, which was later generalized and rendered asymmetric by Barry Trost. Tsuji additionally noted the utility of these alpha-allylated ketones and esters in preparing 1,4-dicarbonyl compounds using the Wacker oxidation.

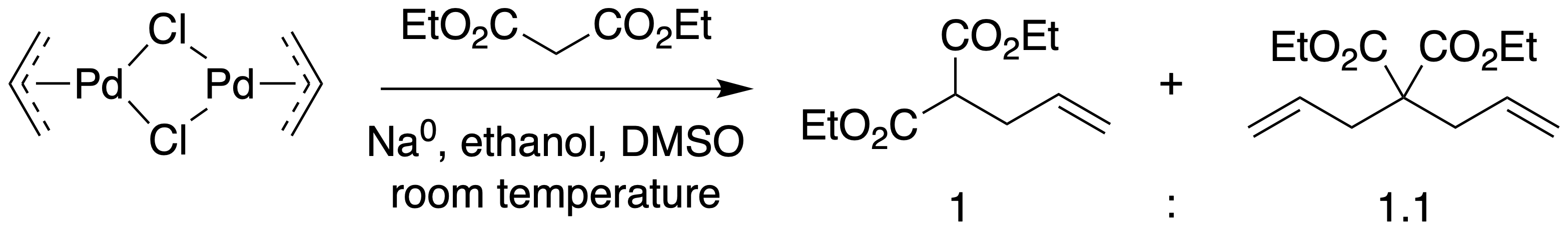
Tsuji's first report of palladium-mediated allylation.

Later research hinged on the discovery that allyl acetoacetates decarboxylate and regioselectively alpha-allylate in the presence of catalytic Pd(OAc)_{2} and PPh_{3} via the intermediacy of an allylpalladium enolate - a catalytic Carroll rearrangement. Following work revealed that replacement of PPh_{3} in the reaction mixture with the bidentate ligand dppe could favor beta-hydride elimination of the palladium enolate, yielding enones. This transformation was applied by Tsuji to the racemic synthesis of methyl jasmonate. Tsuji also found that the palladium enolate could be engaged in intramolecular aldol reactions.

== Awards ==
- 1980 - Chemical Society of Japan Award, for "research on new organic synthesis processes using transition metal compounds"
- 1994 - Purple ribbon medal of honor
- 2004 - Japan Academy Prize, for "research on new organic synthesis reactions using palladium catalysts"
- 2014 - Tetrahedron Prize
- 2016 - Asian Scientist 100, Asian Scientist
