= Corey–House synthesis =

Chemical reaction

The Corey–House synthesis (also called the Corey–Posner–Whitesides–House reaction and other permutations) is an organic reaction that involves the reaction of a lithium diorganylcuprate ($\ce{R_{2}CuLi}$) with an organic halide or pseudohalide ($\ce{R'-X}$) to form a new alkane, as well as an ill-defined organocopper species and lithium (pseudo)halide as byproducts.

Li^{+}[R–Cu–R]^{−} + R′–X → R–R′ + "R–Cu" + LiX

In principle, a carbanion equivalent such as an organolithium or Grignard reagent can react directly (without copper) with an alkyl halide in a nucleophilic substitution reaction to form a new carbon–carbon bond. However, aside from the use of metal acetylides as nucleophiles, such a process rarely works well in practice due to metal–halogen exchange and/or the formation of large amounts of reduction or elimination side-products. As a solution to this problem, the Corey–House reaction constitutes a general and high yielding method for the joining of two alkyl groups or an alkyl group and an aryl group.

== Scope ==
The scope of the Corey-House synthesis is exceptionally broad, and a range of lithium diorganylcuprates (R_{2}CuLi, R = 1°, 2°, or 3° alkyl, aryl, or alkenyl) and organyl (pseudo)halides (RX, R = methyl, benzylic, allylic, 1°, or cyclic 2° alkyl, aryl, or alkenyl and X = Br, I, OTs, or OTf; X = Cl is marginal) will undergo coupling as the nucleophilic and electrophilic coupling partners, respectively. The reaction usually takes place at room temperature or below in an ethereal solvent. Due to the wide range of applicable coupling partners, functional group tolerance, and operational simplicity, the Corey–House synthesis is a powerful and practical tool for the synthesis of complex organic molecules. However, as limitations, hindered (2° or 3°) alkyl halides are generally unsuccessful or low-yielding substrates for the Corey-House synthesis. Furthermore, alkynylcuprates are generally inert under usual coupling conditions. The forging of aryl-aryl bonds is also inefficient and much more effectively achieved using palladium catalysis.

== Reaction process and mechanism ==
The Corey-House synthesis is preceded by two preliminary steps to prepare the requisite Gilman reagent from an alkyl halide. In the first step, the alkyl halide is treated with lithium metal in dry ether to prepare an alkyllithium reagent, RLi. The starting alkyl halide for the lithiation step can be a primary, secondary or tertiary alkyl chloride, bromide, or iodide:

R–X + 2 Li° → RLi + Li^{+}X^{–}

In the second step, a lithium dialkylcuprate, also known as a Gilman reagent (named after Henry Gilman of Iowa State University) is prepared from the alkyllithium by treatment with copper(I) iodide (CuI) in a transmetalation reaction:

2 RLi + CuI → Li^{+}[R–Cu–R]^{–} + LiI

If the use of alkyllithium reagents is precluded by functional group incompatibility, transmetalation from other metals (e.g., Mg, Zn, Al, B) may be considered as alternatives for the preparation of the organocopper reagent.

The Corey-House synthesis process is the reaction between the organocopper reagent, usually a lithium dialkylcuprate as prepared above, and a second alkyl (pseudo)halide or an aryl iodide. This results in the formation of a C–C bond between the two organic fragments:

Li^{+}[R–Cu–R]^{–} + R'–X → R–R' + "RCu" + LiX

From the stoichiometry, it is apparent that one equivalent of the R group is wasted as an ill-characterized alkylcopper species (likely polymeric; usually converted to RH upon aqueous workup) in the most common form of the Corey–House synthesis. To avoid this for cases where R is a precious or complex fragment, a reagent (R)(R_{U})CuM, where R_{U} is an untransferable dummy ligand (e.g., R_{U} = cyano, alkynyl, 2-thienyl, etc.) can be prepared and used instead.

When R and R' are different, only the cross product R–R' is obtained; R–R or R'–R' are not formed in significant amounts. The Corey–House reaction is therefore an example of a cross-coupling reaction. The Corey–House synthesis is, in fact, one of the earliest transition metal-mediated (or catalyzed, see below) cross-coupling reactions to be discovered.

In the case of alkyl bromides and tosylates, inversion of configuration is observed when a configurationally pure alkyl electrophile is used. The reaction is believed to proceed via an S_{N}2-like mechanism to give a copper(III) species, which undergoes reductive elimination to give the coupling product. When alkyl iodides are used, scrambling of configuration is observed, and cyclization products are observed to form for alkyl iodides with an olefin tether, both of which are indicative of the involvement of radicals.

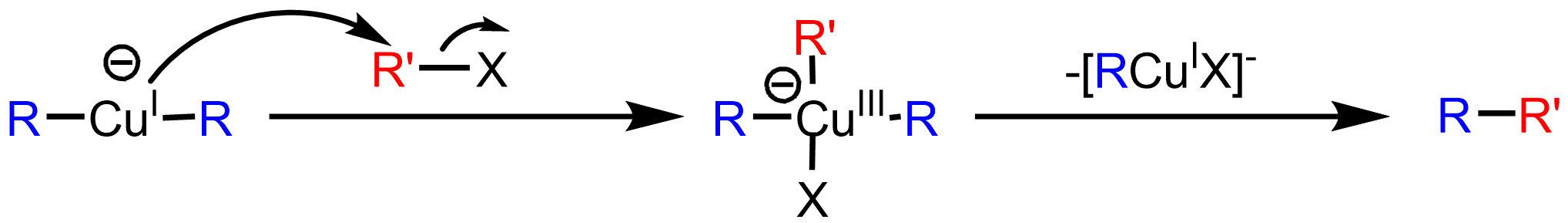

For this reaction to work successfully, the alkyl (pseudo)halide coupling partner should be methyl, benzylic, allylic, 1° alkyl, or 2° cycloalkyl. In most cases, 3° and acyclic 2° electrophiles give unsatisfactory results. (However, see below for recent modifications that allow 2° electrophiles to be used successfully.) On the other hand, sterically hindered organocopper reagents, including 3° and other branched alkyl reagents, are generally tolerated. However, aryl bromides, iodides and sulfonates, which do not ordinarily undergo nucleophilic substitution in the absence of a transition metal, can be used successfully as coupling partners.

== Catalytic version ==
In 1971, Jay Kochi reported that Grignard reagents and alkyl bromides could be coupled using a catalytic amount of lithium tetrachlorocuprate(II), a process that was extended to alkyl tosylates by Schlosser and Fouquet. In the catalytic process, the Grignard reagent undergoes transmetalation with the copper salt or complex to generate an organocuprate as a catalytic intermediate, which then undergoes reaction with the (pseudo)halide electrophile to form the coupling product and release the copper and complete the catalytic cycle.

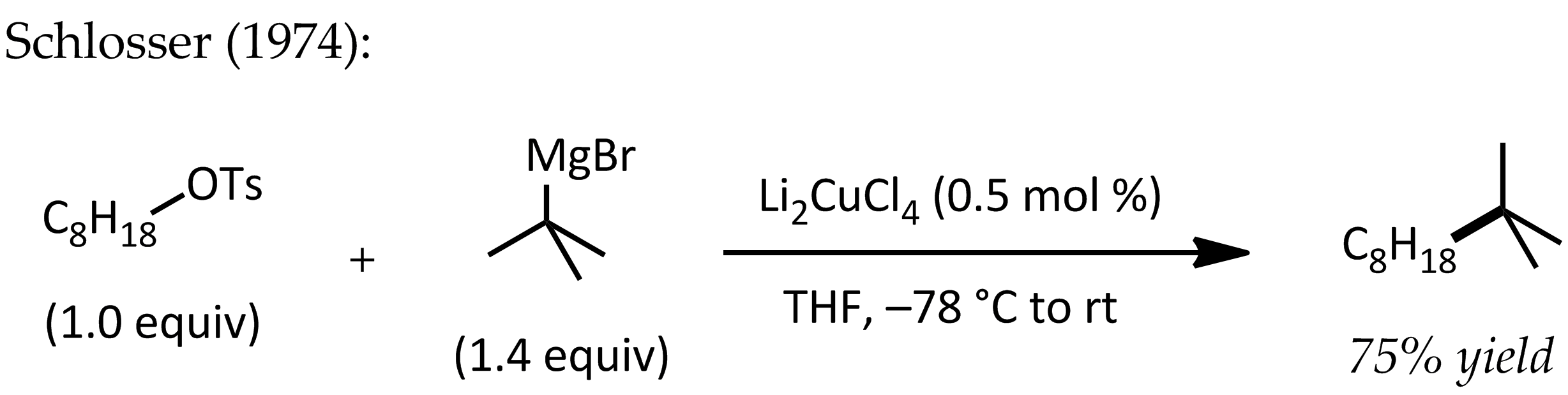

Under recently discovered conditions, using TMEDA as the ligand for copper and lithium methoxide as a base additive, it is now possible to couple 1°, 2°, and 3° Grignard reagents with 1° and 2° alkyl bromides and tosylates in high yields with nearly exclusive stereoinversion. Even β-branched 2° alkyl tosylates react to give coupling product in moderate yield, greatly expanding the scope of the catalytic Corey–House synthesis (Kochi–Schlosser coupling).

== Background ==
While the coupling of organocopper compounds and allyl bromide was reported as early as 1936 by Henry Gilman (Iowa State University), this reaction was fully developed by four organic chemists (two at Harvard and two at MIT):

- E.J. Corey (Harvard University), research advisor of Gary Posner
- Gary H. Posner (Johns Hopkins University), a student of Harvard University at the time
- George M. Whitesides (Massachusetts Institute of Technology; later Harvard University), junior colleague of Herbert House
- Herbert O. House (Massachusetts Institute of Technology; later Georgia Institute of Technology)

== See also ==
- Gilman reagent
- Wurtz reaction
