= Brian Coppola =

Brian P. Coppola
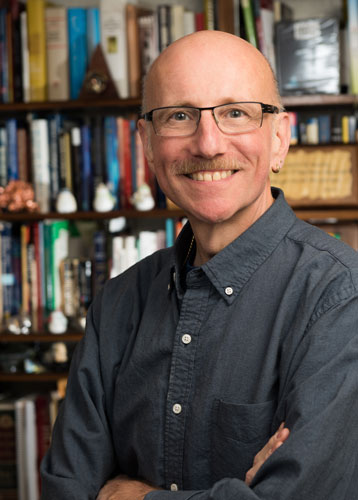
- Brian P. Coppola in November 2015
- Born: 5 February 1957 (age 69); Lawrence, Massachusetts, USA
- Education: University of New Hampshire; University of Wisconsin–Madison
- Known for: CSIE/UM, CALC/UM
- Awards: Robert Foster Cherry Award (2012); MI Assoc. Coll. Univ. Professor of the Year (2016); CASE/Carnegie US National Professor of the Year (2009)
- Scientific career
- Fields: Chemistry; Education
- Workplaces: University of Wisconsin–Whitewater; University of Michigan
- Doctoral advisor: Barry M. Trost
- Website: umich.edu/~bcoppola

Brian P. Coppola (born February 5, 1957, in Lawrence, Massachusetts) is a chemistry professor at the University of Michigan.

In 1998, Professor Coppola was appointed as the Grand Editor (editor in chief) for the quarterly publication of the Professional Chemistry fraternity, Alpha Chi Sigma, The Hexagon of Alpha Chi Sigma. The most noteworthy articles developed for The Hexagon are those of the Rediscovery of the Elements series, which document the history of the discovery of the chemical elements through research and travel to the original sites of their discoveries, authored by Professor James L. Marshall (University of North Texas) and his late wife, Jenny.

From 2010 to 2015, he was an Associate Editor for The Journal for Research in Science Teaching, and co-edited two special issues on Discipline-Centered Post-Secondary Science Education Research (vol 50(6) and vol 51(6) ). He has also served on the editorial boards for The Chemical Educator, International Journal of Science Education, Journal of Chemical Education, and Journal of College Science Teaching.

In 2021, Coppola published a 4-volume textbook for introductory organic chemistry that is "designed to expand the pedagogical mission of a standard textbook with detailed explanations, a guided analysis of important ideas, and a scaffolded set of open response questions to be worked on and filled in as the learner progresses." His summary statement: "This back-to-basics effort has been focused on making an affordable book that students can learn from." () The second printing (2023) includes an extensive, open access set of learning resources (). The books have been noted for their integration of science history and philosophy to frame the presentation of the subject matter (Seeman, J.I. Journal of the American Chemical Society ()).

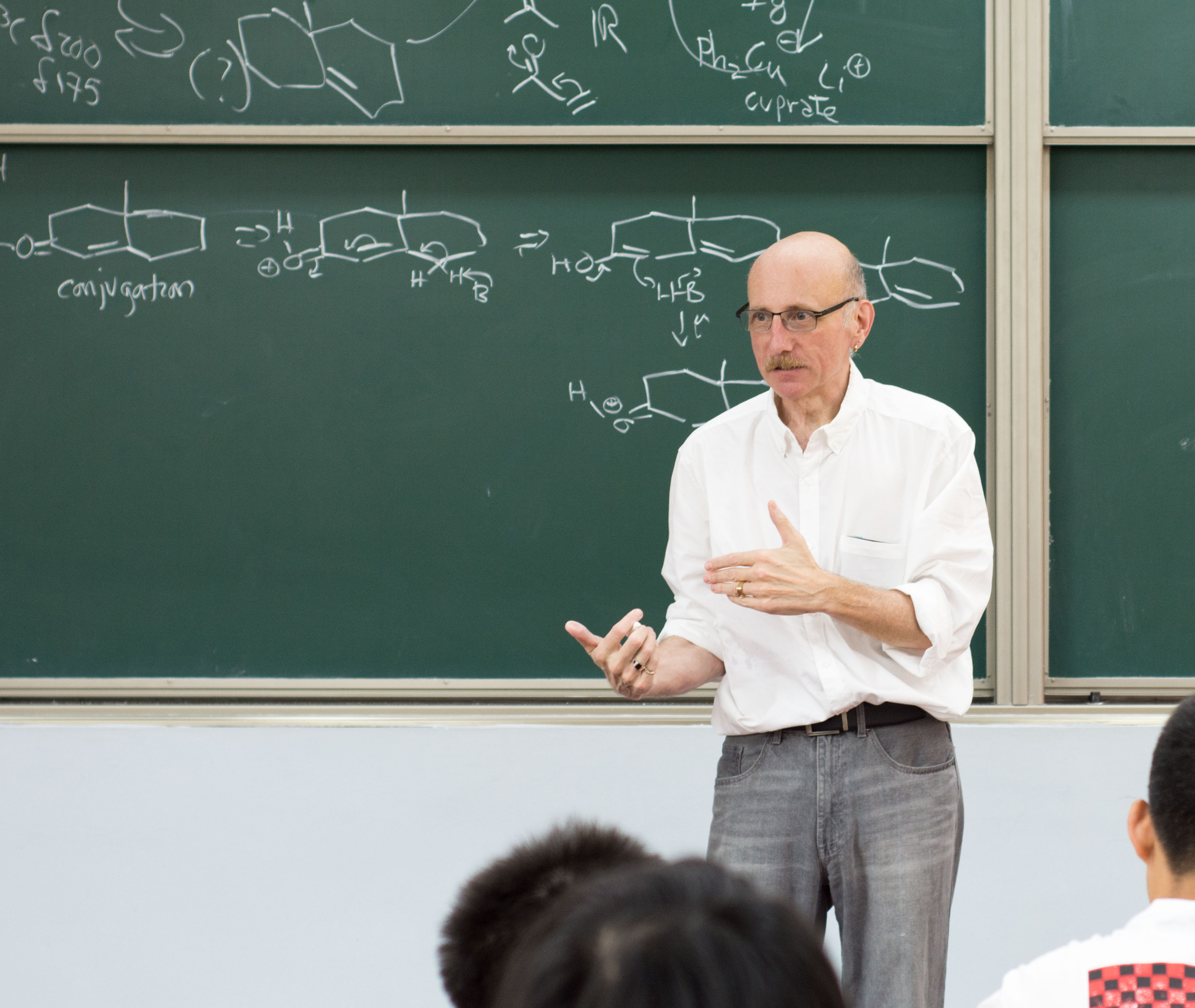
Professor Coppola at Shanghai Jiao Tong University, July 2016

== Selected publications ==
(1) (a) Coppola, B. P. Structure and Reactivity: An Introduction to Organic Chemistry, Book A: Structure and Bonding, 1st ed. (2nd printing); Van-Griner Learning: Cincinnati, OH; 2023. (b) Coppola, B. P. Structure and Reactivity: An Introduction to Organic Chemistry, Book B: Introduction to Reactivity, 1st ed. (2nd printing); Van-Griner Learning: Cincinnati, OH; 2023. (c) Coppola, B. P. Structure and Reactivity: An Introduction to Organic Chemistry, Book C: Carbonyl Reactions, Transformations, and Synthesis, 1st ed. (2nd printing); Van-Griner Learning: Cincinnati, OH; 2023. (d) Coppola, B. P. Structure and Reactivity: An Introduction to Organic Chemistry, Book D: Special Topics, 1st ed. (2nd printing); Van-Griner Learning: Cincinnati, OH; 2023.

(2) Chen, P.; Ong, D. C.; Ng, J. C.;. Coppola, B. P. “Explore, Exploit, and Prune in the Classroom: Strategic Resource Management Behaviors Predict Performance” AERA Open, 2021, 7(1), 1–14.

(3) Coppola, B. P.; Pontrello, J. K. “Student-Generated Instructional Materials” In J. J. Mintzes & E. M. Walter (Eds), Active Learning in College Science: The Case for Evidence Based Practice (Ch. 24). Cham, Switzerland: Springer Nature, 2020; pp 385–407.

(4) Coppola, B. P.; Plough, I. C.; Sun, H. “Purple Dragons and Yellow Toadstools: A Versatile Exercise for Introducing Students to Negotiated Consensus” Science and Engineering Ethics 2019, 29, 1261–1269.

(5) Barnard, R. A.; Boothe, J. R.; Salvatore, J.; Emerson, K.; Boone, A.; Sandler, C.; Coppola, B. P. “Course-based Support for Peer-Led Study Group Facilitators in Large Instructional Team” Journal of College Science Teaching 2018,47, 21–29.

(6) Coppola, B. P. “Broad & Capacious: A New Norm for Instructional Development in a Research Setting” Change, 2016, 48 (2), 34–42.
