= Herbert O. House =

American organic chemist (1929–2013)

Herbert Otis House (December 5, 1929 – October 2, 2013) was an American organic chemist.

House was born in Willoughby, Ohio. He received a Bachelor of Science in chemistry from Miami University in Ohio in 1950 a Doctor of Philosophy in 1953 from the University of Illinois under the guidance of Reynold Fuson. Upon graduation, he joined the faculty of the Massachusetts Institute of Technology and remained there until 1970. During this time, he co-discovered the Corey-House alkane synthesis, an early example of a transition metal mediated cross-coupling reaction. In 1970, he joined the faculty of the Georgia Institute of Technology. House retired in 1990 and was the Vasser Woolley Professor Emeritus at Georgia Tech until his death in 2013 in Alpharetta, Georgia.

In addition to the publication of 180 scientific papers, House received the American Chemical Society's Award for Creative Work in Synthetic Chemistry (1975) and authored the textbook Modern Synthetic Reactions. Renowned organic chemist Barry Trost (Stanford University, formerly Wisconsin) received his Ph.D. (1965) under his mentorship.
