= Tsuji–Wilkinson decarbonylation reaction =

Reaction using Wilkinson's catalyst

Tsuji–Wilkinson decarbonylation
Named after	Jirō Tsuji; Geoffrey Wilkinson
Reaction type	Decarbonylation

The Tsuji–Wilkinson decarbonylation reaction is a method for the decarbonylation of aldehydes and some acyl chlorides. The reaction name recognizes Jirō Tsuji, whose team first reported the use of Wilkinson's catalyst (RhCl(PPh_{3})_{3}) for these reactions:

RC(O)X + RhCl(PPh_{3})_{3} → RX + RhCl(CO)(PPh_{3})_{2} + PPh_{3}

Although decarbonylation can be effected by several transition metal complexes, Wilkinson's catalyst has proven the most effective.

== Reaction mechanism ==
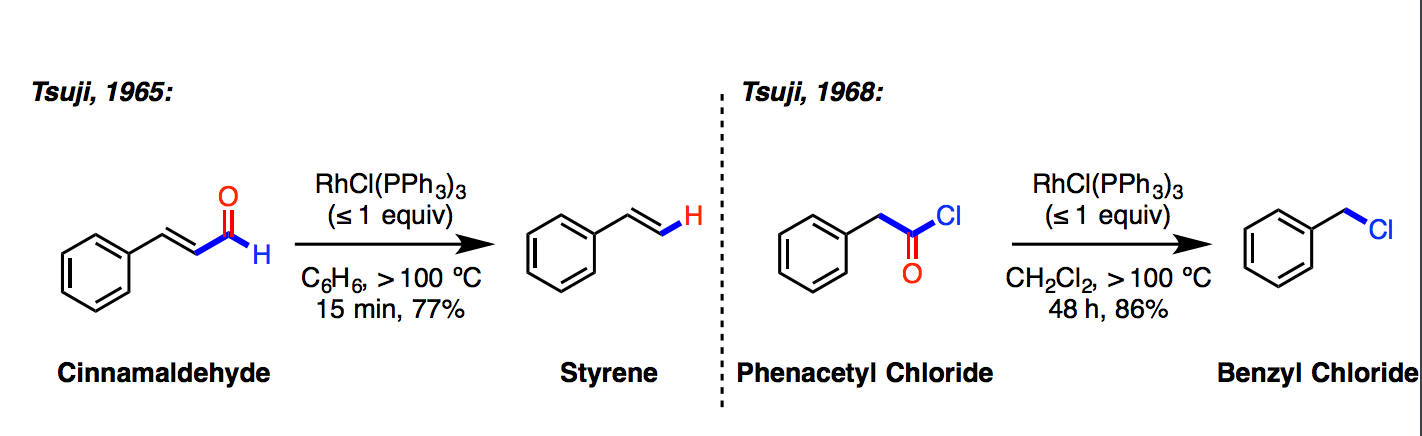
Discovery of Tsuji–Wilkinson

Strictly speaking, this reaction results in the formation of a rhodium carbonyl complex rather than free carbon monoxide.

The catalytic cycle is assumed to involve oxidative addition of the aldehyde (or acid chloride) to give a 16e acyl Rh(III)-hydride intermediate, which undergoes migratory extrusion of CO proceed to form an 18-electron d6 Rh(III) carbonyl complex. Reductive elimination produces the decarbonylated product. In the catalytic variant of the Tsuji–Wilkinson decarbonylation, RhCl(CO)(PPh_{3})_{2} evolves CO above 200 °C, thereby regenerating RhCl(PPh_{3})_{n}. Otherwise, the reaction mechanism halts by formation of this thermodynamically stable carbonyl complex.

== Synthetic applications ==
The Tsuji–Wilkinson decarbonylation proceeds under mild conditions and is highly stereospecific. In addition to aliphatic, aromatic, and α,β-unsaturated aldehydes, acyl nitriles and 1,2-diketones are also suitable substrates. Few methods exist for decarbonylation.

One illustrative application is the synthesis of the core nucleus of FR-900482. Note that the ester is unaffected by the rhodium reagent.

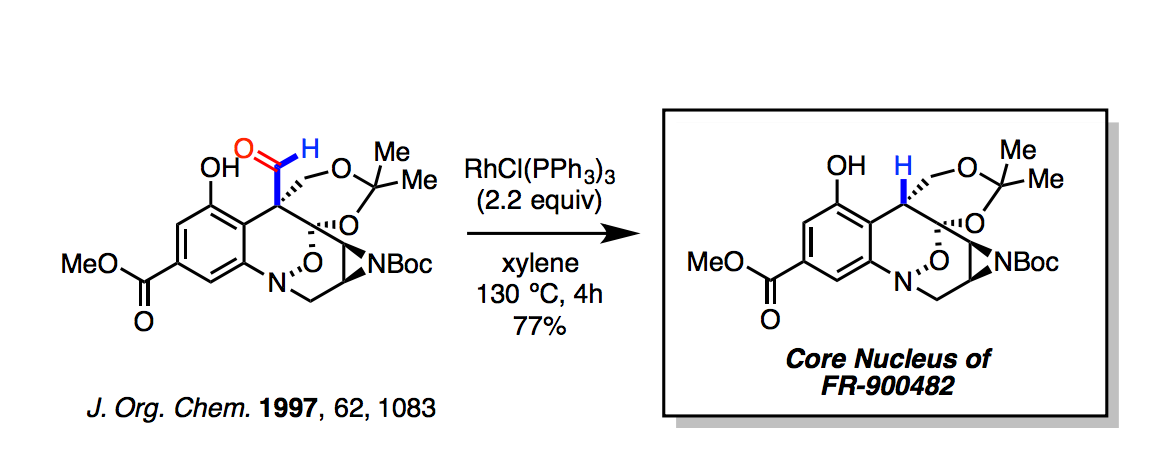
Synthetic example of Tsuji–Wilkinson 1

The Tsuji–Wilkinson decarbonylation is employed in the penultimate step of the synthesis of (–)-presilphiperfolan-8-ol. They comment “Of note in these final steps, separate reduction and oxidation steps proceeded in inferior yield in generating 38 (70% versus 93%), while the Rh(PPh_{3})_{3}Cl operation proceeded smoothly when conducted on small scale (~15 mg). In total, the synthesis required 13 steps from commercial starting material, and ~15 mg of [(–)-presilphiperfolan-8-ol] has been prepared with spectral properties and optical rotations matching that of the natural isolate.”

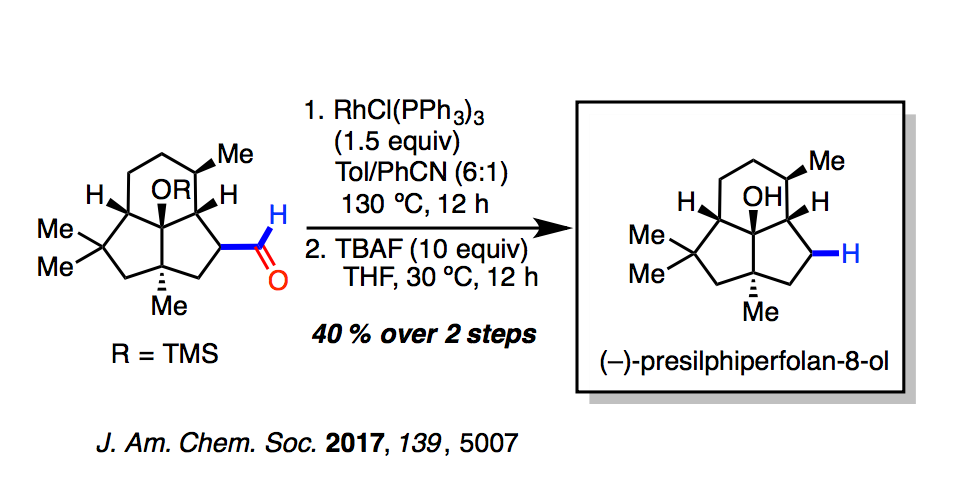
Synthetic example of Tsuji–Wilkinson 2

== Efforts to render a low temperature catalytic Tsuji–Wilkinson decarbonylation ==
Unfortunately, the Tsuji–Wilkinson decarbonylation is stoichiometric. The product bis(triphenylphosphine)rhodium carbonyl chloride is not readily converted back to a CO-free reagent. Above 200 °C, carbon monoxide RhCl(CO)(PPh_{3})_{2} does decarbonylate, however these high temperatures are often prohibitive. The ideal Tsuji–Wilkinson decarbonylation would be by catalytic near ambient temperatures.

The reaction has been carried out in flow conditions at low temperatures in which a biphasic liquid-gas flow decarbonylation was developed employing N_{2} as a gas carrier. However, the temperature required for this reaction is 200 °C.

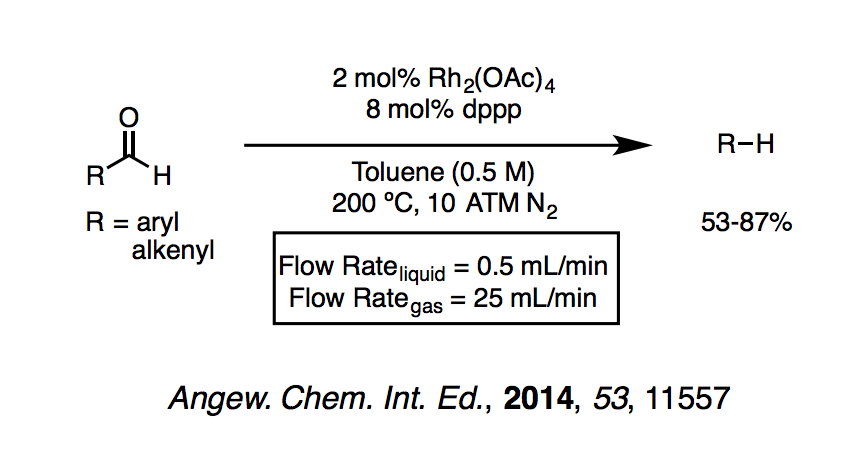
Tsuji–Wilkinson in flow

Significant improvements of the Tsuji–Wilkinson decarbonylation have been made by using cationic rhodium complexes with chelating bisphosphines.

== Historic references ==
- Tsuji, Jiro; Ohno, Kiyotaka (January 1965). "Organic syntheses by means of noble metal compounds XXI. Decarbonylation of aldehydes using rhodium complex". Tetrahedron Letters. 6 (44): 3969–3971. doi:10.1016/S0040-4039(01)89127-9.
- Tsuji, Jiro; Ohno, Kiyotaka; Kajimoto, Tsunesuke (January 1965). "Organic syntheses by means of noble metal compounds XX. Decarbonylation of acyl chloride and aldehyde catalyzed by palladium and its relationship with the rosenmund reduction". Tetrahedron Letters. 6 (50): 4565–4568. doi:10.1016/S0040-4039(01)89065-1.
- Synthesis, 1969, 157.
- Ohno, Kiyotaka; Tsuji, Jiro (1968). "Organic synthesis by means of noble metal compounds. XXXV. Novel decarbonylation reactions of aldehydes and acyl halides using rhodium complexes". Journal of the American Chemical Society. 90 (1): 99–107. doi:10.1021/ja01003a018.
