= Gilman reagent =

Class of chemical compounds

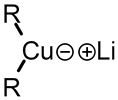
General structure of a Gilman reagent

A Gilman reagent is a diorganocopper compound with the formula Li[CuR_{2}], where R is an alkyl or aryl. They are colorless solids.

== Use in organic chemistry ==
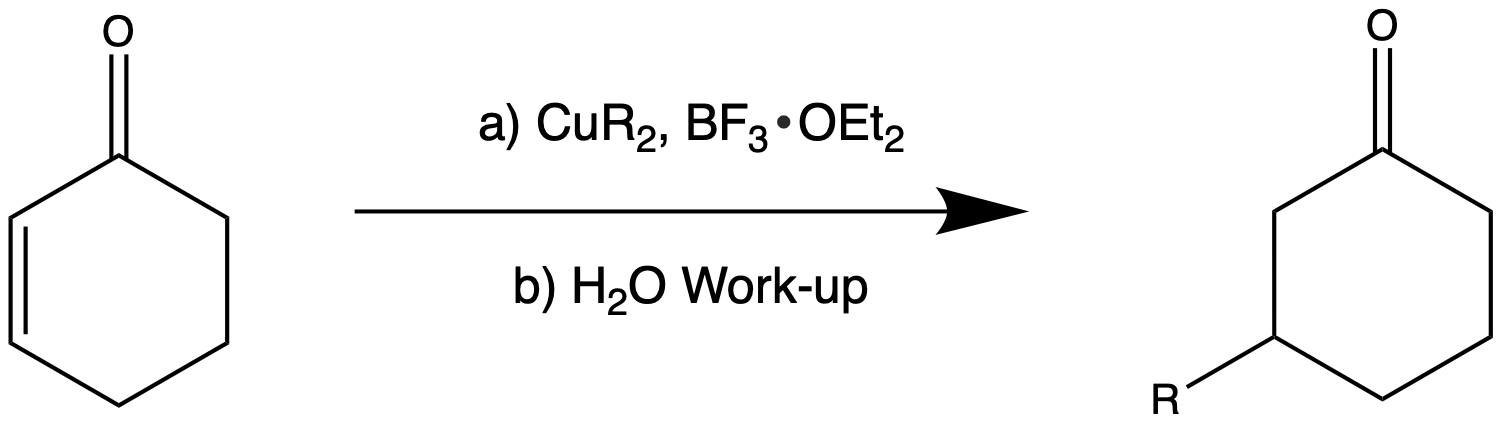
A conjugated 1,4 addition using a Gilman reagent with an arbitrary R group

These reagents are useful because, unlike related Grignard reagents and organolithium reagents, they react with organic halides to replace the halide group with an R group (the Corey–House reaction). Such displacement reactions allow for the synthesis of complex products from simple building blocks. Lewis acids can be used to modify the reagent.

$[\ce{R}{-}{\color{Blue}\ce{Cu}}\ce{-R}]^-\ce{Li+}\ \xrightarrow{\color{Red}\ce{R'-X}}\ \overbrace{\left[\ce R{-}\overset{{\displaystyle \color{Red} \ce R'} \atop |}\underset{| \atop {\displaystyle \color{Red} \ce X}}{\color{Blue}\ce{Cu}}\ce{-R} \right]^-\ce{Li+}}^\text{planar intermediate} \ce{-> R}{-}{\color{Blue}\ce{Cu}} + \ce{R}{-}{\color{Red}\ce{R'}} + \ce{Li}{-}{\color{Red}\ce{X}}$
Generalized chemical reaction showing Gilman’s reagent reacting with organic halide to form products and showing Cu(III) reaction intermediate

== History ==
These reagents were discovered by Henry Gilman and coworkers. Lithium dimethylcopper (CH_{3})_{2}CuLi can be prepared by adding copper(I) iodide to methyllithium in tetrahydrofuran at −78 °C. In the reaction depicted below, the Gilman reagent is a methylating reagent reacting with an alkyne in a conjugate addition, and the ester group forms a cyclic enone.

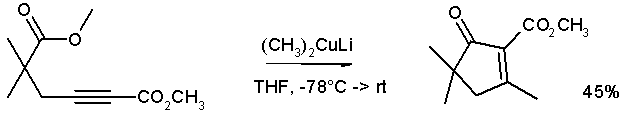
Example Gilman reagent reaction

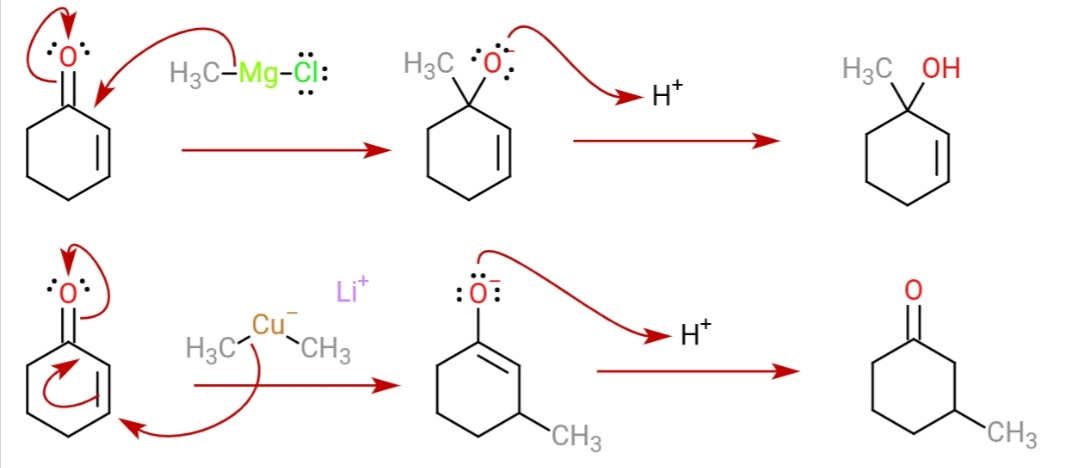

== Structure ==
Lithium dimethylcuprate exists as a dimer in diethyl ether forming an 8-membered ring. Similarly, lithium diphenylcuprate crystallizes as a dimeric etherate, [{Li(OEt_{2})}(CuPh_{2})]_{2}.

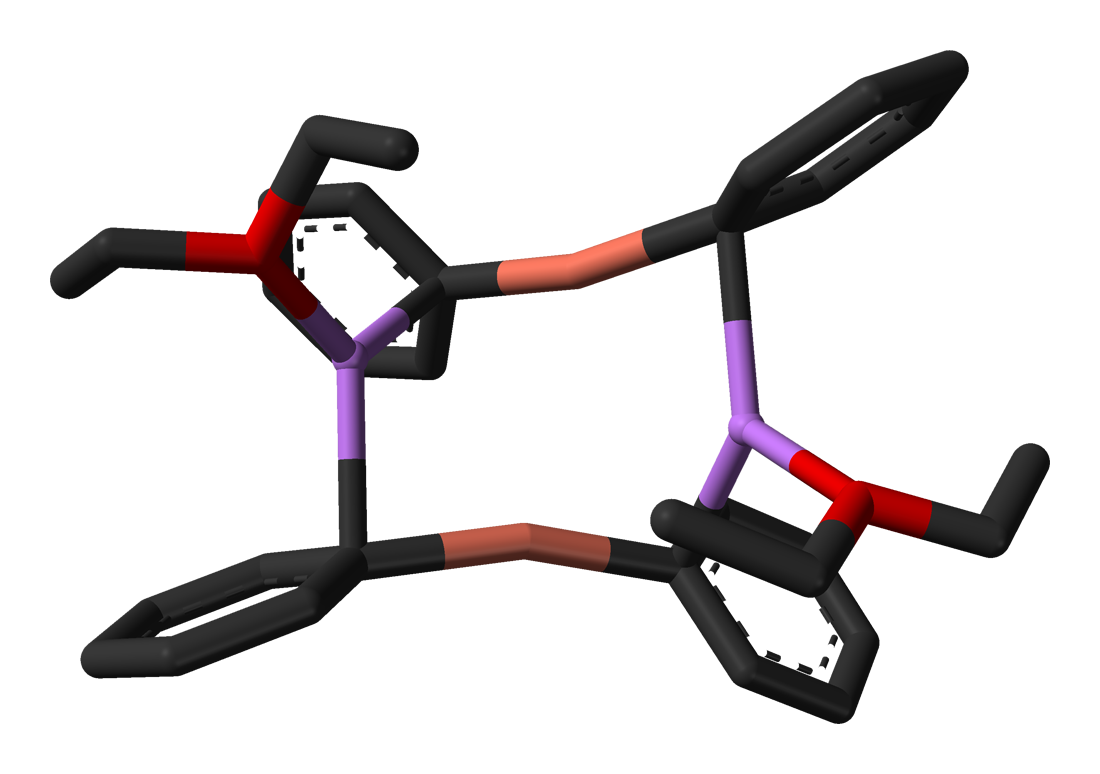
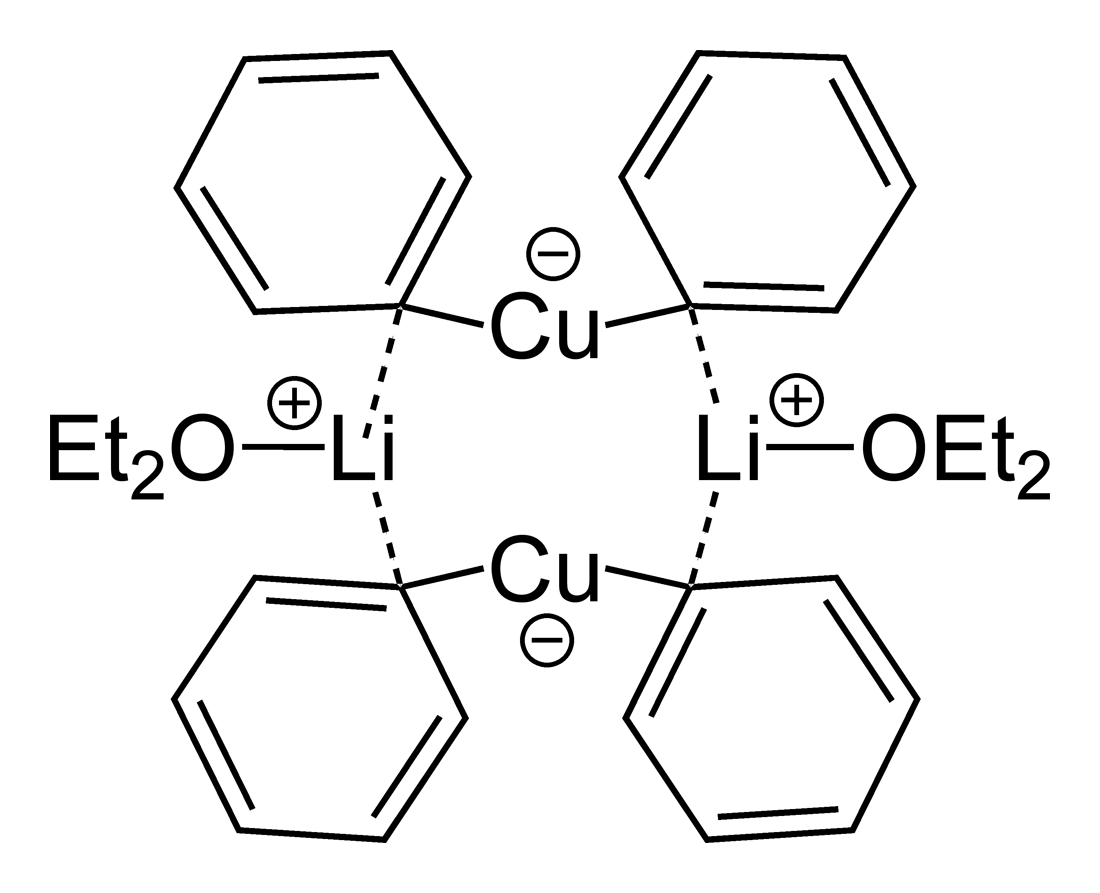

If the Li^{+} ions are complexed with the crown ether 12-crown-4, the resulting diorganylcuprate anions adopt a linear coordination geometry at copper.

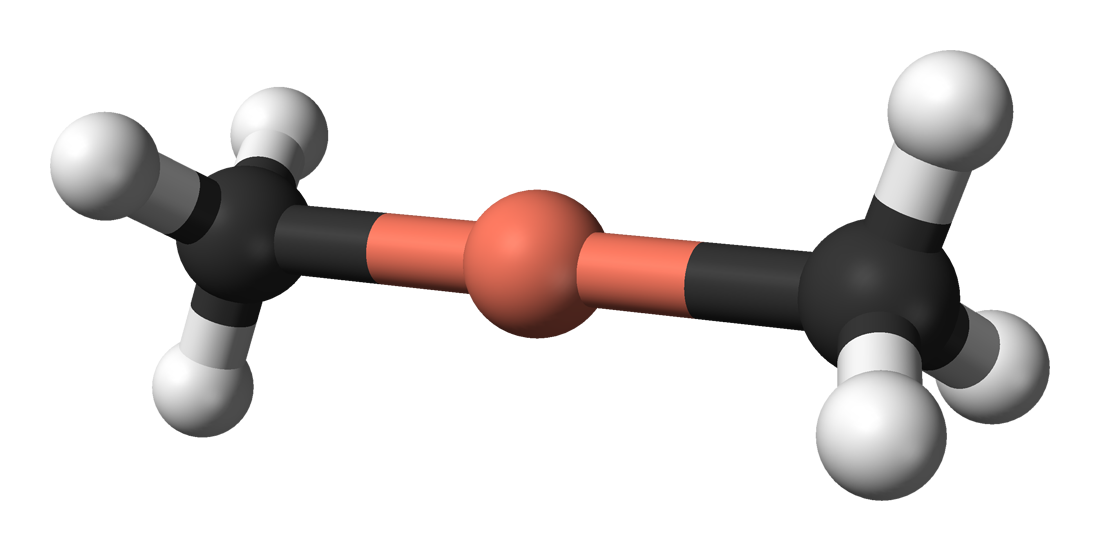
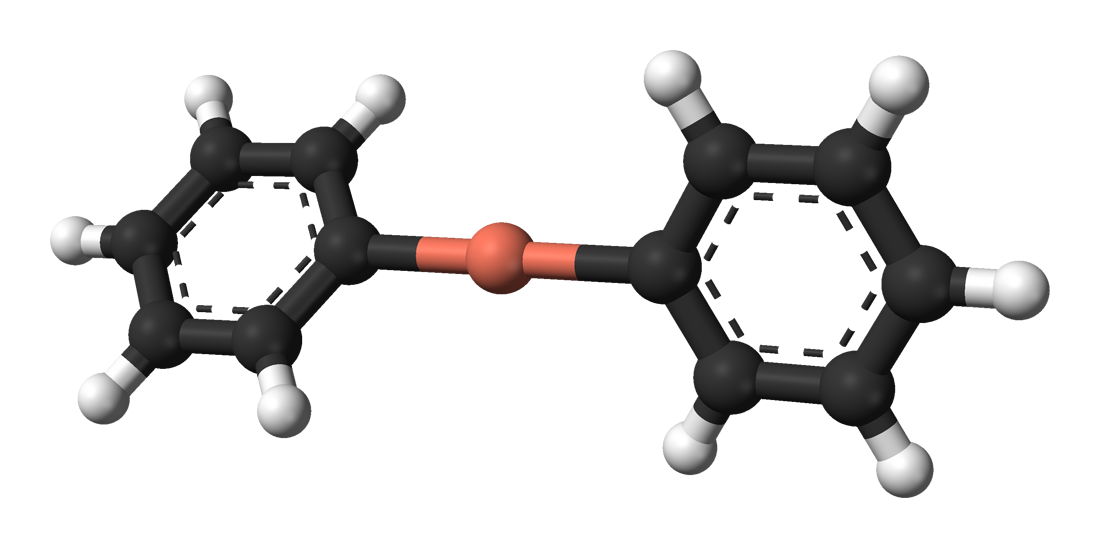

For the 'higher order cyanocuprate' Li_{2}CuCN(CH_{3})_{2}, Lipshutz and coworkers have claimed that the cyanide ligand is coordinated to Li and π-bound to Cu. However, the existence of 'mixed higher order organocuprates' has been disputed by Bertz and coworkers, who rejoined that the cyano ligand is actually bound solely to the lithium atom, and that such a structure could still explain the enhanced reactivity of cuprate prepared from CuCN. To date, no crystallographic evidence for the existence of 'mixed higher order cuprates' ([R_{2}CuX]^{2–}, X ≠ R) has been obtained. On the other hand, a homoleptic higher order cuprate in the form of a [Ph_{3}Cu]^{2–} moiety has been observed in Li_{3}Cu_{2}Ph_{5}(SMe_{2})_{4}, prepared by Olmstead and Power.

== Mixed cuprates ==
More useful generally than the Gilman reagents are the so-called mixed cuprates with the formula [RCuX]^{−} and [R_{2}CuX]^{2−} (see above for the controversy over existence of the latter). Such compounds are often prepared by the addition of the organolithium reagent to copper(I) halides and cyanide. These mixed cuprates are more stable and more readily purified. One problem addressed by mixed cuprates is the economical use of the alkyl group. Thus, in some applications, the mixed cuprate with the formula Li_{2}[Cu(2-thienyl)(CN)R] is prepared by combining thienyllithium and cuprous cyanide followed by the organic group to be transferred. In this higher order mixed cuprate, both the cyanide and thienyl groups do not transfer, only the R group does.

== See also ==
- Cuprate (chemistry)
