= Asymmetric ion-pairing catalysis =

Asymmetric ion-pairing catalysis in chemistry is a type of asymmetric catalysis taking place specifically with charged intermediates or charged reagents. In one type of catalysis ion-pairing exists with a charged and chiral catalyst. The charged catalyst can be cationic or anionic. Catalysis by anionic catalysts is also called asymmetric counteranion-directed catalysis. In the other variation of asymmetric ion-pairing catalysis called anion or cation binding, the chiral catalyst is neutral but binds in a noncovalent way to an intermediate ion pair. Asymmetric ion-pairing catalysis is distinct from other covalent types of catalysis such as Lewis acid catalysis and Bronsted acid catalysis. It is one of several strategies in enantioselective synthesis and of some relevance to academic research.

The first reported example of this type of catalysis is attributed to Dolling, Davis & Grabowski who in 1984 used a chiral cinchonidine based phase transfer catalyst in the synthesis of indacrinone. Important chiral cation scaffolds are quaternary ammonium cations and quaternary phosphonium cations. The first reported example of asymmetric cation-binding catalysis originates from Cram and Sogah who in 1981 used a chiral crown ether in combination with a potassium base in an enantioselective Michael addition. The development of chiral anionic catalysists is a more recent research field. In 2000 Llewellyn, Adamson & Arndtsen used a chiral borate anion in olefin aziridination and cyclopropanation. Another regularly encountered scaffold is a chiral phosphate anion together with iminium, carbocationic or oxocarbenium counterions. Chiral anion phase-transfer catalysis was introduced by Toste in 2007.
