= Decarbonylation =

Organic reaction that involves loss of CO

In chemistry, decarbonylation is a type of organic reaction that involves the loss of carbon monoxide (CO). It is often an undesirable reaction, since it represents a degradation. In the chemistry of metal carbonyls, decarbonylation describes a substitution process, whereby a CO ligand is replaced by another ligand.

== Organic chemistry ==
In the absence of metal catalysts, decarbonylation (vs decarboxylation) is rarely observed in organic chemistry. One exception is the decarbonylation of formic acid:

HCOOH → CO + H_{2}O

The reaction is induced by sulfuric acid, which functions as both a catalyst and a dehydrating agent. Via this reaction, formic acid is occasionally employed as a source of CO in the laboratory in lieu of cylinders of this toxic gas.

With strong heating, formic acid and some of its derivatives may undergo decarbonylation, even without adding a catalyst. For instance, dimethylformamide ((CH_{3})_{2}NC(O)H) slowly decomposes to give dimethylamine and carbon monoxide when heated to its boiling point (154 °C). Some derivatives of formic acid, like formyl chloride (−COCl), undergo spontaneous decarbonylation at room temperature (or below).

Reactions involving oxalyl chloride (COCl)_{2} (e.g., hydrolysis, reaction with carboxylic acids, Swern oxidation, etc.) often liberate both carbon dioxide and carbon monoxide via a fragmentation process.

α-Hydroxy acids, e.g. (lactic acid and glycolic acid) undergo decarbonylation when treated with catalytic concentrated sulfuric acid, by the following mechanism:

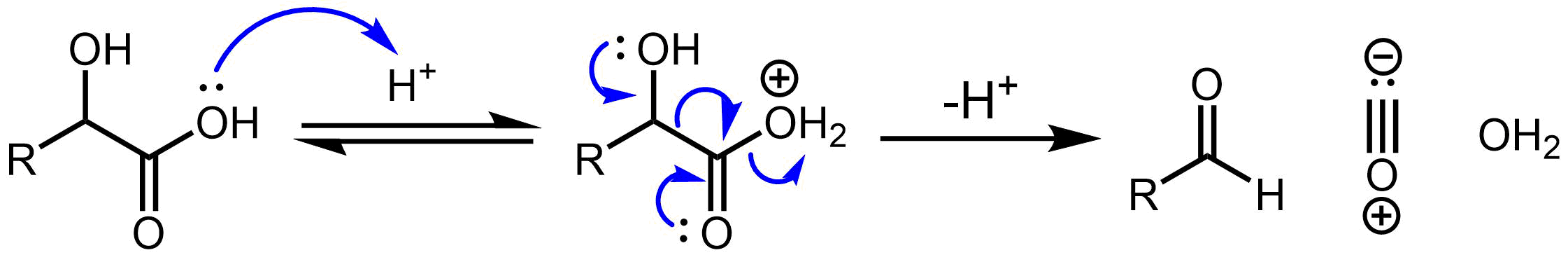

Silacarboxylic acids (R_{3}SiCOOH) undergo decarbonylation upon heating or treatment with base and have been investigated as carbon monoxide-generating molecules.

=== Aldehyde decarbonylation ===
A common transformation involves the conversion of aldehydes to alkanes.

RCHO → RH + CO

Decarbonylation can be catalyzed by soluble metal complexes. These reactions proceed via the intermediacy of metal acyl hydrides. An example of this is the Tsuji–Wilkinson decarbonylation reaction using Wilkinson's catalyst. (Strictly speaking, the noncatalytic version of this reaction results in the formation of a rhodium carbonyl complex rather than free carbon monoxide.) This reaction is generally carried out on small scale in the course of a complex natural product total synthesis, because although this reaction is very efficient at slightly elevated temperatures (e.g., 80 °C) when stoichiometric rhodium is used, catalyst turnover via extrusion of CO requires dissociation of a very stable rhodium carbonyl complex and temperatures exceeding 200 °C are required. This conversion is of value in organic synthesis, where decarbonylation is an otherwise rare reaction.

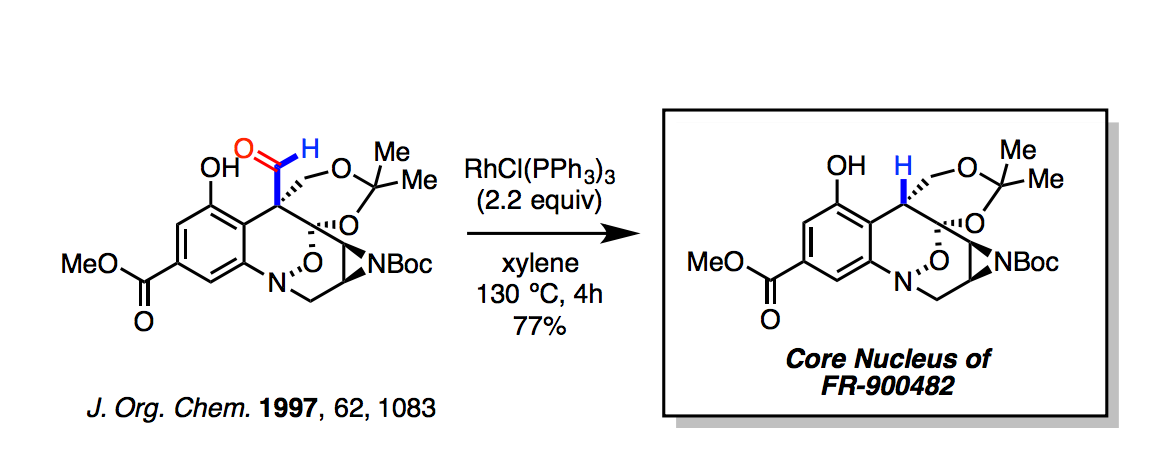
Tsuji–Wilkinson decarbonylation

Decarbonylations are of interest in the conversions of sugars. Ketones and other carbonyl-containing functional groups are more resistant to decarbonylation than are aldehydes.

=== Pericyclic reactions ===
Some cyclic molecules containing a ketone undergo a cheletropic extrusion reaction, leaving new carbon–carbon π bonds on the remaining structure. This reaction can be spontaneous, as in the synthesis of hexaphenylbenzene. Cyclopropenones and cyclobutenediones can be converted to alkynes by elimination of one or two molecules of CO, respectively.

== Biochemistry ==
Carbon monoxide is released in the degradation (catabolism) of heme by the action of O_{2}, NADPH and the enzyme heme oxygenase:

Heme b + 3 O_{2} + 3/_{2} NADPH + 3/_{2} H^{+} → biliverdin + Fe^{2+} + CO + 3/_{2} NADP^{+} + 3H_{2}O

== Inorganic and organometallic synthesis ==
Many metal carbonyls are prepared via decarbonylation reactions. The CO ligand in Vaska's complex arises by the decarbonylation of dimethylformamide:

IrCl_{3}(H_{2}O)_{3} + 3 P(C_{6}H_{5})_{3} + HCON(CH_{3})_{2} + C_{6}H_{5}NH_{2} → IrCl(CO)[P(C_{6}H_{5})_{3}]_{2} + [(CH_{3})_{2}NH_{2}]Cl + OP(C_{6}H_{5})_{3} + [C_{6}H_{5}NH_{3}]Cl + 2 H_{2}O

The conversion of Fe(CO)_{5} and Mo(CO)_{6} to their many derivatives often involves decarbonylation. Here decarbonylation accompanies the preparation of cyclopentadienyliron dicarbonyl dimer:

2 Fe(CO)_{5} + C_{10}H_{12} → (η^{5}−C_{5}H_{5})_{2}Fe_{2}(CO)_{4} + 6 CO + H_{2}

Decarbonylation can be induced photochemically as well as using reagents such as trimethylamine N-oxide:

Me_{3}NO + L + Fe(CO)_{5} → Me_{3}N + CO_{2} + LFe(CO)_{4}
