= Guangbin Dong =

American organic chemist

- Born: Qingdao, China
- Education: Peking University (B.S.) Stanford University (Ph.D.)
- Known for: C-C Activation; Pd/NBE Catalysis; Boron Chemistry; Carbonyl Functionalization; Total Synthesis; Graphene Nanoribbon
- Awards: Mukaiyama Award (2025) Mitsui Chemicals Catalysis Science Awards (2024); AAAS (American Association for the Advancement of Science) Fellow (2024); Elias J. Corey Award for Outstanding Original Contribution in Organic Synthesis by a Young Investigator (2024) Tetrahedron Young Investigator Award (2021)
- Scientific career
- Fields: Organic Chemistry
- Workplaces: The University of Chicago
- Thesis: Synthetic efficiency: Using atom-economical and chemoselective approaches towards total syntheses of agelas alkaloids, terpestacin and bryostatins (2009)
- Doctoral advisor: Barry M. Trost
- Website: https://voices.uchicago.edu/donggroup/

Guangbin Dong (Chinese: 董广彬) is an organic chemist. He currently serves as the Weldon G. Brown Professor at the University of Chicago. His expertise is in the field of organic synthesis, catalysis, organometallics, medicinal chemistry, and material science. He has worked in the field of carbon-carbon activation for reorganizing skeletons of organic molecules, systematic development of the palladium/norbornene catalysis for arene functionalization, site-selective and atom-economical carbonyl functionalization, diverse boron-based functionalization and programmable synthesis, and bottom-up precise synthesis of graphene nanoribbons.

== Education and career ==
Dong was born in Qingdao, a coastal city in China. Dong received his B.S. degree from Peking University and completed his Ph.D. degree in Chemistry from Stanford University with Professor Barry M. Trost. Dong's Ph.D. research studies involved the development of new catalytic enantioselective synthetic methods, which were applied in the total syntheses of biologically important molecules. Most of the natural products Dong synthesized exhibit high-potent anticancer activity, such as agelastatin A, terpestacin, and bryostatins. In addition, he has designed and synthesized a new bryostatin analogue; in collaboration with Genetech, this agent has shown nanomolar anticancer activity against several cancer cell lines. In 2009, Dong joined the group of Prof. Robert H. Grubbs at California Institute of Technology, as a postdoctoral researcher. At California Institute of Technology, his research aimed at the development of catalysts for anti-Markovnikov hydration of olefins, considered as one of the top 10 challenges in catalysis. Dong developed the first reproducible anti-Markovnikov olefin hydration process using a dual-metal system. In 2011, Dong was appointed to the faculty at the University of Texas, Austin, where from 2011 to 2016, he was an assistant professor. In 2016, Dong moved to the University of Chicago as a full professor. In 2023, Dong became the first chair of the Weldon G. Brown Professorship at the University of Chicago.

== Research ==
Dong's research focuses on the following areas:

1) Pushing the boundary of C-C bond activation for efficient synthesis of complex organic molecules. For example, his research group has realized the "cut-and-sew" and "hook-and-slide" strategies for manipulating inert C-C bonds to achieve synthetically useful transformations.

2) Rendering the metal/norbornene cooperative catalysis as a useful tool for pharmaceutical research. For example, they have addressed a number of limitations in this field and achieved carbonyl 1,2-transposition using the Pd/NBE catalysis.

3) Tackling challenges in synthesis of complex bioactive natural products. They have completed the first total synthesis of phainanoid natural products, which are highly potent immunosuppressants.

4) Developing compact molecular synthesizers for automated organic synthesis.

5) Realizing programmable synthesis of monodisperse sequence-defined graphene nanoribbon materials.

== Awards and honors ==
- Mukaiyama Award (2025)
- Friedrich Wilhelm Bessel Research Award by the Alexander von Humboldt Foundation (2024)
- Mitsui Chemicals Catalysis Science Awards (2024)
- AAAS (American Association for the Advancement of Science) Fellow (2024)
- Elias J. Corey Award for Outstanding Original Contribution in Organic Synthesis by a Young Investigator (2024)
- Tetrahedron Young Investigator Award (2021)
- Arthur C. Cope Scholar (2017)
- IUPAC Prizes for Young Chemists, IUPAC (2010)
- Camille and Henry Dreyfus Environmental Chemistry Fellow (2009)
