= F. Dean Toste =

American chemist (born 1971)

Dean Toste
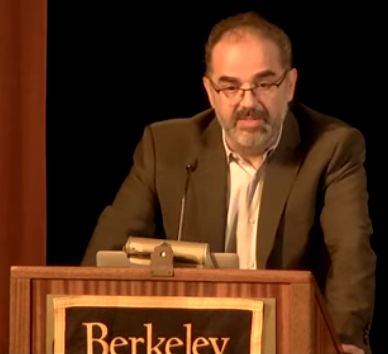
- At the 2023 talk "Molecular Harvesters for Carbon and Water from Air"
- Born: Francisco Dean Toste; 1971 (age 54–55); Terceira, Azores, Portugal
- Education: University of Toronto B.Sc. (1993) M.Sc. (1995); Stanford University Ph.D. (2000)
- Known for: Organogold chemistry asymmetric ion-pairing catalysis
- Scientific career
- Fields: Chemistry
- Workplaces: University of California, Berkeley
- Thesis: Part A. Phenols in palladium catalyzed reactions. Enantioselective total syntheses of (-)-galanthamine, (-)-aflatoxin B(1) and (-)-calanolide A and B. Part B. Ruthenium catalyzed carbon-carbon bond forming reactions (2001)
- Doctoral advisor: Barry Trost
- Other academic advisors: Robert H. Grubbs; Ian Still
- Website: www.cchem.berkeley.edu/toste/index.html

Francisco Dean Toste (born 1971) is the Gerald E. K. Branch Distinguished Professor of Chemistry at the University of California, Berkeley and faculty scientist at the chemical sciences division of Lawrence Berkeley National Lab. He is a prominent figure in the field of organic chemistry and is best known for his contributions to gold chemistry and asymmetric ion-pairing catalysis. Toste was elected a Fellow of the Royal Society of Canada in 2015,, member of the American Academy of Arts and Sciences in 2018, Fellow of the National Academy of Sciences in 2020, and a Fellow of the Royal Society in 2026.

== Education and training ==
F. Dean Toste was born in Terceira, Azores, Portugal in 1971. He attended the University of Toronto for his undergraduate and masters studies in the group of Ian Still. With Still, Toste developed several novel reactions of thiocyanates that were then applied towards the synthesis of the natural product Varacin. He earned his B.Sc. in 1993 and his M.Sc. in 1995. Toste attended graduate school at Stanford University, earning his PhD under the supervision of Barry Trost in 2000 While at Stanford, Toste published twenty-four publications on a range of topics, including phenols in palladium-catalyzed reactions, and ruthenium-catalyzed carbon-carbon bond forming reactions. He also completed the enantioselective total syntheses of the natural products (−)-galanthamine, (−)-aflatoxin B_{1} and (−)-calanolide A and B.

From 2001 to 2002, Toste conducted postdoctoral studies at the California Institute of Technology with Robert H. Grubbs, where he worked on ruthenium-catalyzed cross-metathesis variants of the olefin metathesis reaction.

== Independent career ==
Toste joined the faculty at Berkeley in 2002 as an assistant professor. He was promoted to associate professor in 2006, and professor in 2009. In 2017, Toste was appointed the Gerald E. K. Branch Distinguished Professor. He has served as a faculty scientist at the chemical sciences division of Lawrence Berkeley National Lab since 2007.

== Awards and honors ==
Toste is the recipient of numerous awards for his work, including the Janssen Prize for Creativity in Organic Synthesis in 2018, the Humboldt Research Award in 2016, the Catalysis in Organic Chemistry Award from the Royal Society of Chemistry in 2018, and the American Chemical Society Cope Scholar and E. J. Corey Awards.
