= Barry Trost =

American chemist (born 1941)

Barry Martin Trost
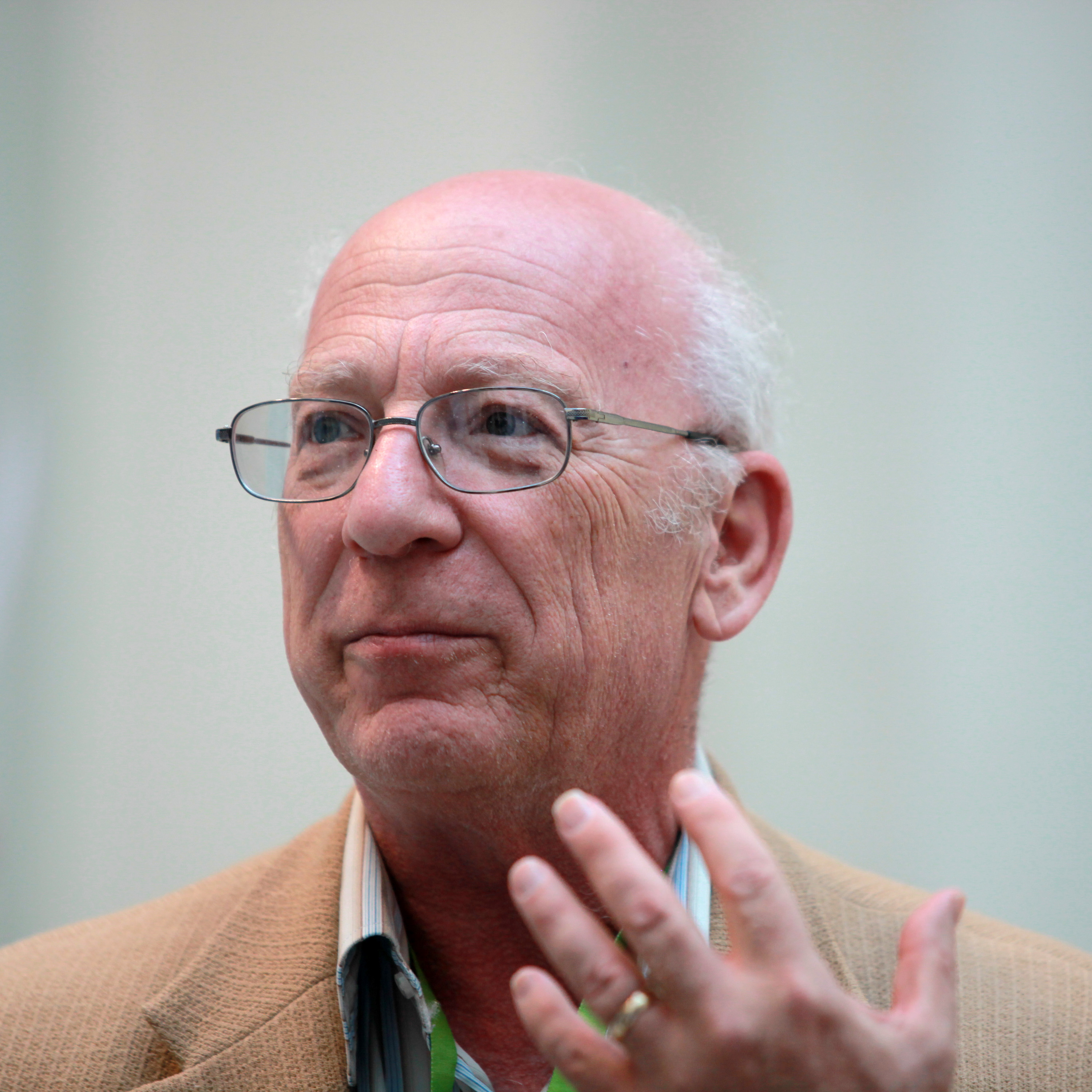
- Barry M. Trost in June 2012
- Born: June 13, 1941 (age 85); Philadelphia, Pennsylvania, United States
- Education: University of Pennsylvania B.S. (1963); Massachusetts Institute of Technology Ph.D. (1965)
- Known for: Tsuji–Trost reaction, Trost ligand, Atom economy
- Awards: ACS Award in Pure Chemistry (1977); Ernest Guenther Award (1990); William H. Nichols Medal (2000); Arthur C. Cope Award (2004); The Ryoji Noyori Prize (2013); Linus Pauling Award (2015)
- Scientific career
- Fields: Organic Chemistry
- Workplaces: University of Wisconsin–Madison; Stanford University
- Thesis: The Structure and Reactivity of Enolate Anions (1965)
- Doctoral advisor: Herbert O. House
- Doctoral students: Brian Coppola; Michael J. Krische; F. Dean Toste; Guangbin Dong

Barry M. Trost (born June 13, 1941, in Philadelphia) is an American chemist who is the Job and Gertrud Tamaki Professor Emeritus in the School of Humanities and Sciences at Stanford University. The Tsuji–Trost reaction and the Trost ligand are named after him. He is prominent for advancing the concept of atom economy.

== Early life and education ==
Trost was born in Philadelphia, Pennsylvania on June 13, 1941. He studied at the University of Pennsylvania and obtained his B.A. in 1962. He then attended the Massachusetts Institute of Technology for graduate school, where he worked with Herbert O. House on enolate anions, the Mannich reaction, and the Robinson annulation. Trost graduated with his Ph.D. in 1965.

== Independent career ==
Trost moved to the University of Wisconsin–Madison to begin his independent career, and was promoted to professor of chemistry in 1969, and the Vilas Research Professor in 1982. In 1987, he moved to Stanford University as professor of chemistry, and was appointed the Job and Gertrud Tamaki Professor of Humanities and Sciences in 1990. He previously served as chair of the department of chemistry.

As of June 2026, Trost has an h-index of 179 according to Google Scholar and of 154 (1042 documents) according to Scopus.

== Research ==
Trost's research focused on chemical synthesis. In order to build complex target molecules from simple molecules, Trost developed new reactions and reagents, and utilized cascade reactions and tandem reactions. Target molecules have potential applications as novel catalysts, as well as antibiotic and anti-tumor therapeutics.
