= Trost ligand =

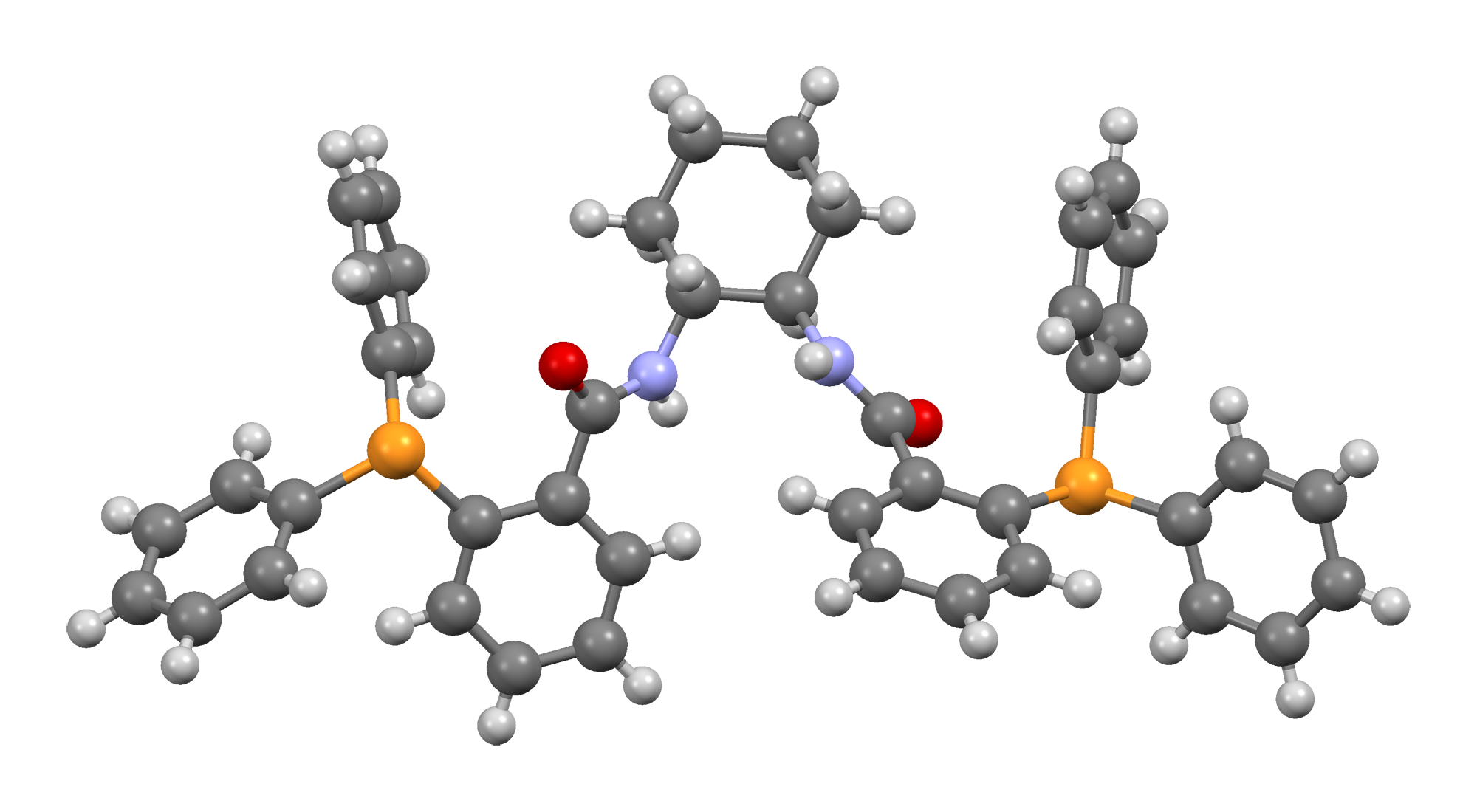

Names
- IUPAC name (1R,2R)-(+)-1,2-diaminocyclohexane-N,N'-bis(2-diphenylphosphinobenzoyl)
- Preferred IUPAC name N,N′-[(1R,2R)-cyclohexane-1,2-diyl]bis[2-(diphenylphosphanyl)benzamide]
- Other names Trost's ligand

Identifiers
CAS Number	138517-61-0
3D model (JSmol)	Interactive image
ChemSpider	9138733
PubChem CID	10963521
UNII	M4RRX95R5F
CompTox Dashboard (EPA)	DTXSID80894121
- InChI: InChI=1S/C44H40N2O2P2/c47-43(37-27-13-17-31-41(37)49(33-19-5-1-6-20-33)34-21-7-2-8-22-34)45-39-29-15-16-30-40(39)46-44(48)38-28-14-18-32-42(38)50(35-23-9-3-10-24-35)36-25-11-4-12-26-36/h1-14,17-28,31-32,39-40H,15-16,29-30H2,(H,45,47)(H,46,48)/t39-,40-/m0/s1 Key: AXMSEDAJMGFTLR-ZAQUEYBZSA-N; InChI=1/C44H40N2O2P2/c47-43(37-27-13-17-31-41(37)49(33-19-5-1-6-20-33)34-21-7-2-8-22-34)45-39-29-15-16-30-40(39)46-44(48)38-28-14-18-32-42(38)50(35-23-9-3-10-24-35)36-25-11-4-12-26-36/h1-14,17-28,31-32,39-40H,15-16,29-30H2,(H,45,47)(H,46,48)/t39-,40-/m0/s1 Key: AXMSEDAJMGFTLR-ZAQUEYBZBE
- SMILES: O=C(N[C@H]4CCCC[C@@H]4NC(=O)c3ccccc3P(c1ccccc1)c2ccccc2)c7ccccc7P(c5ccccc5)c6ccccc6

Properties
Chemical formula	C_{44}H_{40}N_{2}O_{2}P_{2}
Molar mass	690.75 g/mol
Appearance	White solid
Melting point	136 to 142 °C (277 to 288 °F; 409 to 415 K)
Solubility in water	Insoluble; soluble in organic solvents (e.g. acetonitrile, dichloromethane) 1,4-dioxane, methanol, tetrahydrofuran, toluene
- Except where otherwise noted, data are given for materials in their standard state (at 25 °C [77 °F], 100 kPa). verify (what is ?) Infobox references

The Trost ligand is a diphosphine used in the palladium-catalyzed Trost asymmetric allylic alkylation. Other C_{2}-symmetric ligands derived from trans-1,2-diaminocyclohexane (DACH) have been developed, such as the (R,R)-DACH-naphthyl ligand derived from 2-diphenylphosphino-1-naphthalenecarboxylic acid. Related bidentate phosphine-containing ligands derived from other chiral diamines and 2-diphenylphosphinobenzoic acid have also been developed for applications in asymmetric synthesis.

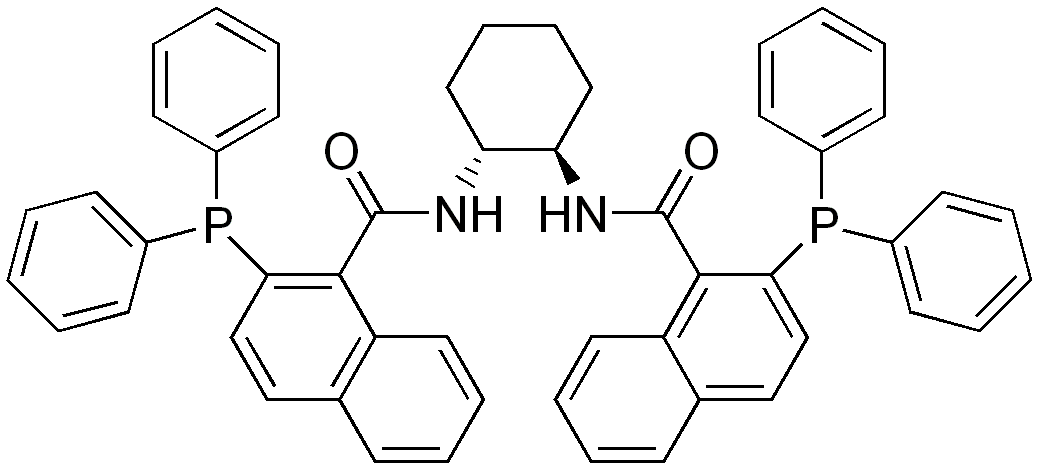
(R,R)-DACH-naphthyl Trost ligand, (1R,2R)-(+)-1,2-diaminocyclohexane-N,N′-bis(2-diphenylphosphino-1-naphthoyl)
