= Henry Gilman =

American organic chemist

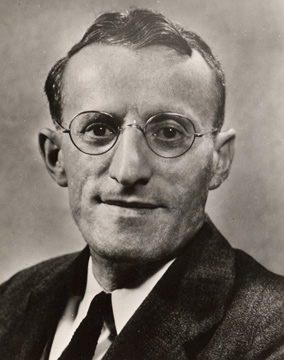
- Born: May 9, 1893; Boston, Massachusetts, U.S.
- Died: November 7, 1986 (aged 93); Ames, Iowa, U.S.
- Education: Harvard University (BS, MA, PhD)
- Known for: Gilman reagent
- Scientific career
- Fields: Organic chemistry
- Workplaces: Iowa State University
- Doctoral advisor: E. P. Kohler

Henry Gilman ForMemRS (May 9, 1893 – November 7, 1986) was an American organic chemist known as the father of organometallic chemistry. He discovered the Gilman reagent, which bears his name.

== Early life and education ==
Henry Gilman was born in Boston, Massachusetts, as the son of a tailor. He was the third of eight children. Gilman graduated from a Boston high school and later attended Harvard University, where he graduated summa cum laude with a Bachelor of Science degree in 1915. During his final year as an undergraduate at Harvard, Gilman researched with Roger Adams. During this time, the two worked on the synthesis of substituted phenyl esters of oxalic acids. Gilman worked hard on his research describing it as 'a sheer delight' and often worked until midnight 'without any compulsion-just for the joy of it' and claimed this was an important step toward his interest in research. After undergraduate work Gilman was invited to stay for graduate work with the head of the Harvard department of chemistry, E.P. Kohler. Based on his work, he received a Master of Arts degree in 1917 (a year late) and a PhD in 1918.

While attending graduate school, Gilman had an opportunity to travel in Europe as a recipient of the Sheldon Fellowship. He spent time at both the Polytechnicum in Zurich and at Oxford in England. During his time in Europe, Gilman met Madame Curie at the Sorbonne, the historic University of Paris. While staying in Paris, Gilman met Victor Grignard and was intrigued by the advances in organic chemistry in France made possible by Grignard reagents. Once he was able to research independently, Gilman was determined to explore the chemistry of these organometallic reagents.

== Career ==
For a short time after receiving his PhD, Henry Gilman worked an associate professor at the University of Illinois after being invited by his former instructor Roger Adams. In 1919, Gilman moved on to become an assistant professor in charge of organic chemistry at Iowa State College of Agriculture and Mechanic Arts (now Iowa State University). At the age of 30, Gilman was given the title of full professor. While at Iowa State College, Gilman met Ruth V. Shaw, a student of his first-year organic chemistry class, and the two were married in 1929. Gilman switched to the Episcopal church from the Jewish faith upon marriage.

Gilman had high expectations for his graduate students, and it often took them more than twice as long as the norm to earn their degrees. They were expected to work in the research lab well into the night and on weekends. Gilman was known for frequently visiting the lab during the day and questioning each student as to what they had accomplished since his last visit. He would also go on business trips and not inform his secretary or students on when he would come back in an effort to discourage skipping. Gilman had another common practice for his graduate students. He would not assign a research project for his graduate students, but he would push students to produce a series of preparations. Students would write short publications that would spark ideas about additional experiments to perform, drawing all the material together to form a central thesis.

During his career, Gilman consulted for many companies such as Quaker Oats and DuPont, although he continued as a professor at Iowa State University, as it came to be known. At the usual retirement age of 70, at that time, Gilman chose not to retire from Iowa State University and remained active in research until 1975 when he was 82 years old.

World War II brought new opportunities for Gilman to do research for the government. He took part in the Manhattan Project, which was the code name for the government's work on the atom bomb. Gilman concentrated on preparing volatile uranium derivatives, mainly dealing with alkoxides, and the syntheses of species with potential anti-malarial activities.

== Later years (1947–1986) ==
In 1947, due to a combination of glaucoma and detachment of a retina Henry Gilman became blind in one eye and lost most of his vision in the other. He was forced to rely on his wife and students to act as his eyes, to read and write for him. His wife was almost always at his side to guide him in unfamiliar places and inform him of the people around him. Remarkably, he continued much of his work and never let his loss of sight hinder his skills. It could be argued that the majority of Gilman's work was done after 1947. In 1973, the current chemistry building at Iowa State University was renamed Henry Gilman Hall.

Gilman had heart problems late in his life and was fitted with a pace-maker at the age of 88. He died in Ames, IA at the age of 93 and was followed by his wife less than two months later and she was followed by their daughter Jane six months later. They are survived by a son and four grandchildren.

== Works ==
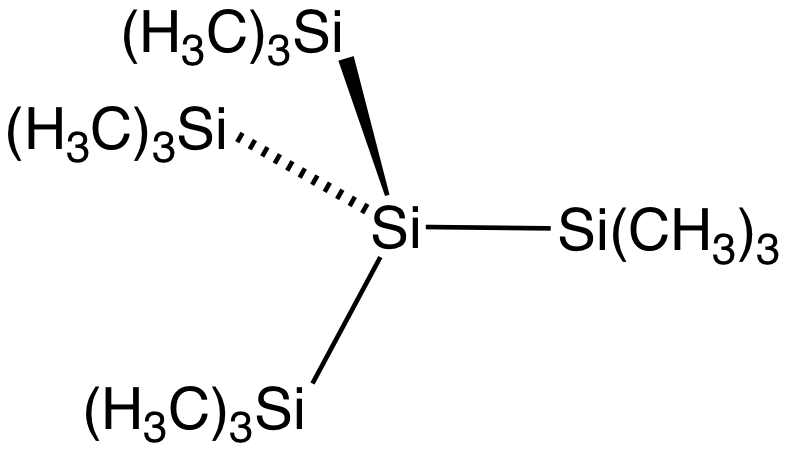
Tetrakis(trimethylsilyl)silane is one of many organosilicon compounds first reported by Gilman et al.

During his lifetime, Gilman completed 1020 papers, 584 of which were published after he became blind in 1947. In 1936, the Journal of Organic Chemistry was created by Gilman with the help of M.S. Kharasch. In 1938, he published a two-volume textbook titled Organic Chemistry: An Advanced Treatise, the first major organic chemistry textbook, with each chapter being contributed by leading leaders in the U.S. Subsequent additions were published in 1943 and another two editions in 1953. Gilman reagents are named after him.

== Honors and awards ==
- Elected to National Academy of Sciences, 1945
- Iowa Award and Midwest Award of American Chemical Society, 1951
- Honorary Fellow of the British Chemical Society, 1961
- First American Chemical Society Frederic Stanley Kipping Award in Organosilicon Chemistry, 1962
- Distinguished Fellowship Awards, Iowa Academy of Sciences, 1975
- Priestley Medal of the American Chemical Society, 1977
- Iowa Governor's Science Medal, 1982

Along with his numerous state, national, and international awards and honors, Gilman has had many tributes in his memory at Iowa State University. In 1962, Gilman became a distinguished professor at ISU. The chemistry building on Iowa State University's campus was renamed Gilman Hall in 1974. That same year, the annual series of Gilman Lectures was established. In his memory, the Gilman Graduate Fellowship Fund was established in 1987.
