= Hydrogen-bond catalysis =

Type of organocatalysis

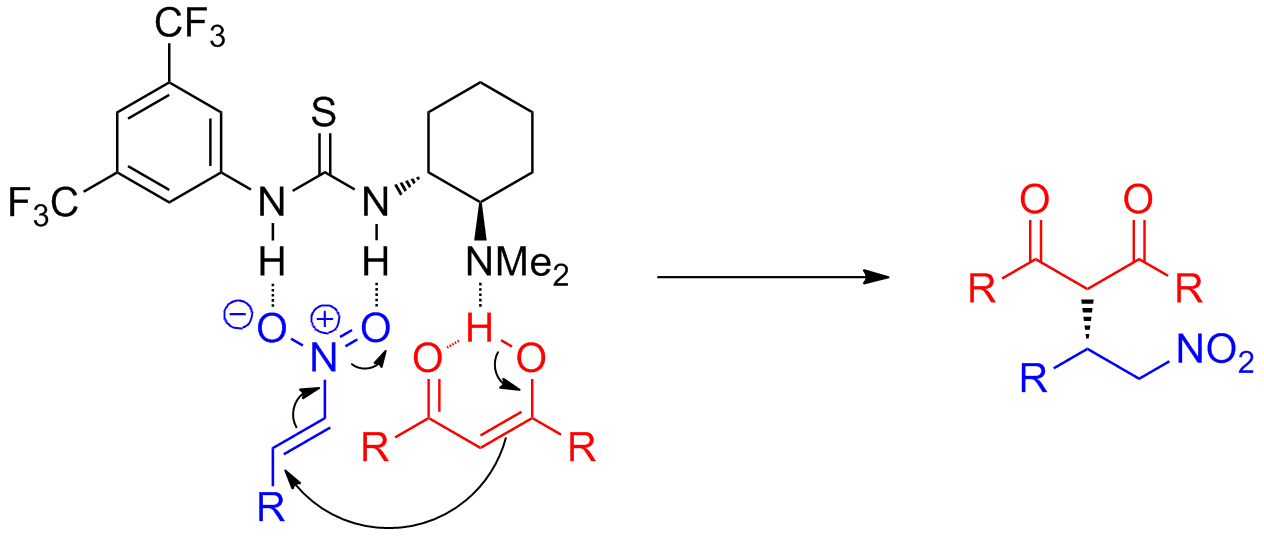
Asymmetric Michael addition to a nitro-olefin by hydrogen bond catalysis developed by Takemoto. The thiourea hydrogen bonds to the nitro group and stabilizes the incoming negative charge, while the amine acts a specific base to activate the nucleophile. This is an example of bifunctional catalysis.

Hydrogen-bond catalysis is a type of organocatalysis that relies on use of hydrogen bonding interactions to accelerate and control organic reactions. In biological systems, hydrogen bonding plays a key role in many enzymatic reactions, both in orienting the substrate molecules and lowering barriers to reaction. The field is relatively undeveloped compared to research in Lewis acid catalysis.

Hydrogen-bond donors can catalyze reactions through a variety of mechanisms. Hydrogen bonding can stabilize anionic intermediates. They sequester anions, enabling the formation of reactive electrophilic cations. More acidic donors can act as general or specific acids, which activate electrophiles by protonation. A powerful approach is the simultaneous activation of both partners in a reaction, e.g. nucleophile and electrophile, termed "bifunctional catalysis". In all cases, the close association of the catalyst molecule to substrate also makes hydrogen-bond catalysis a powerful method of inducing enantioselectivity.

Hydrogen-bonding catalysts are often simple to make, relatively robust, and can be synthesized in high enantiomeric purity. New reactions catalyzed by hydrogen-bond donors are being discovered at an increasing pace, including asymmetric variants of common organic reactions, such as aldol additions, Diels-Alder cycloadditions and Mannich reactions.

== Catalytic strategies ==
=== Stabilization of tetrahedral intermediates ===
Many organic reactions involve the formation of tetrahedral intermediates through nucleophilic attack of functional groups such as aldehydes, amides or imines. In these cases, catalysis with hydrogen-bond donors is an attractive strategy since the anionic tetrahedral intermediates are better hydrogen-bond acceptors than the starting compound. This means that relative to the initial catalyst-substrate complex, the transition state, bearing more negative charge, is stabilized.

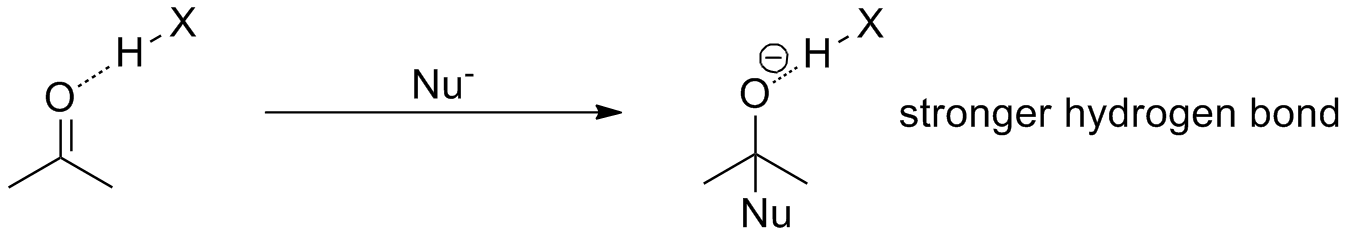

For example, in a typical acyl substitution reaction, the starting carbonyl compound is coordinated to the catalyst through one, two or possibly more hydrogen bonds. During the attack of the nucleophile, negative charge builds on the oxygen until the tetrahedral intermediate is reached. Therefore, the formally negative oxygen engages in a much stronger hydrogen bond than the starting carbonyl oxygen because of its increased negative charge. Energetically, this has the effect of lowering the intermediate and the transition state, thus accelerating the reaction.

This mode of catalysis is found in the active sites of many enzymes, such as the serine proteases. In this example, the amide carbonyl is coordinated to two N–H donors. These sites of multiple coordination designed to promote carbonyl reactions in biology are termed "oxyanion holes". Delivery of serine nucleophile forms a tetrahedral intermediate, which is stabilized by the increase hydrogen bonding to the oxyanion hole.

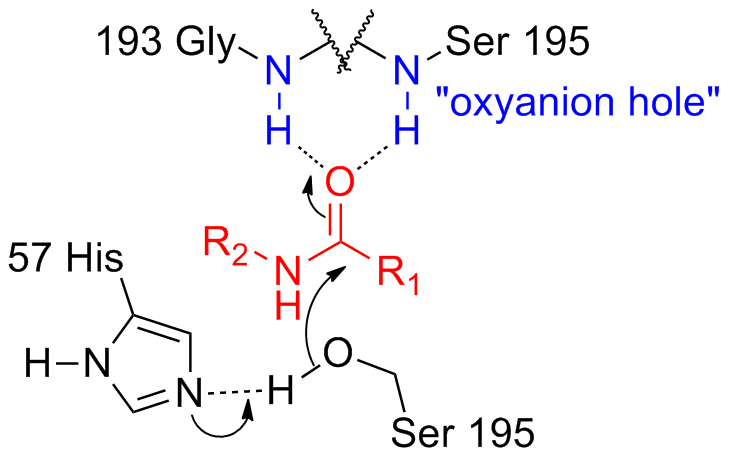

Many synthetic catalysts employ this strategy to activate a variety of electrophiles. Using a chiral BINOL catalyst, for instance, the Morita-Baylis-Hillman reaction involving the addition of enones to aldehydes can be effected with high enantioselectivity. The nucleophile is an enolate-type species generated from the conjugate addition of PEt_{3} to the enone, and adds enantioselectively to the aldehyde coordinated to catalyst.

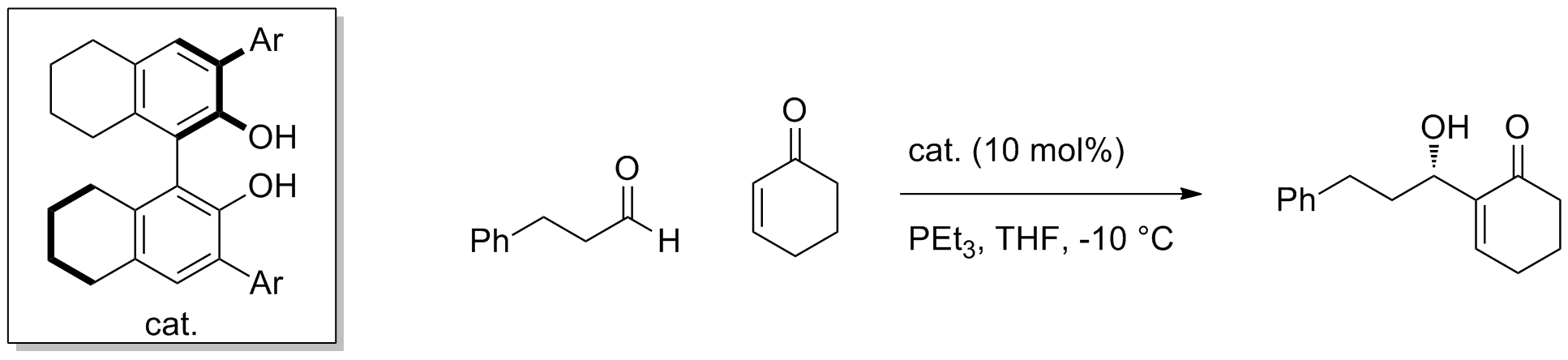

In addition to carbonyls, other electrophiles such as imines can be used. For example, using a simple chiral thiourea catalyst, the asymmetric Mannich reaction of aromatic imines with silyl ketene acetals can be catalyzed with high ee in near quantitative conversion. The mechanism of this reaction is not fully resolved and the reaction is very substrate-specific, only effective on certain aromatic electrophiles.

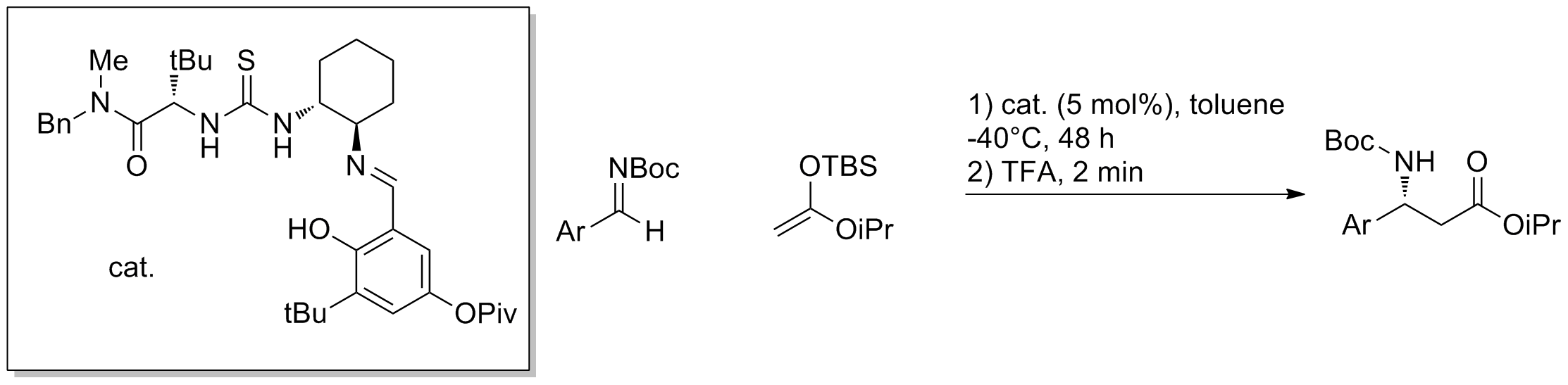

The scope of this mode of activation includes combinations of electrophiles, nucleophiles and catalyst structures. Furthermore, analogous reactions involving oxyanion intermediates such as enolate addition to nitroso compounds or opening of epoxides have also been catalyzed with this strategy.

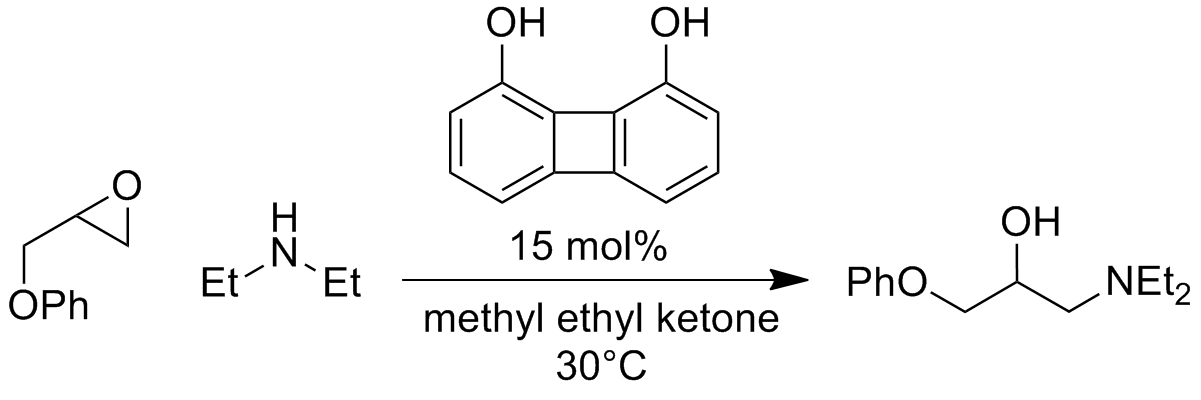

=== Stabilization of anionic fragments ===
Another strategy that has been explored is the stabilization of reactions that develop partial negative charges in the transition state. Examples of applications are most commonly reactions that are approximated concerted and pericyclic in nature. During the course of the reaction, one fragment develops partial negative character and the transition state can be stabilized by accepting hydrogen bond(s).

A demonstrative example is the catalysis of Claisen rearrangements of ester-substituted allyl vinyl ethers reported by the Jacobsen research group. A chiral guanidinium catalyst was found to promote the reaction near room temperature with high enantioselectivity. During the transition state, the fragment coordinated to the amidinium catalyst develops partial anionic character due to the electronegativity of the oxygen and the electron-withdrawing ester group. This increases the strength of hydrogen bonding and lowers the transition state energy, thus accelerating the reaction.

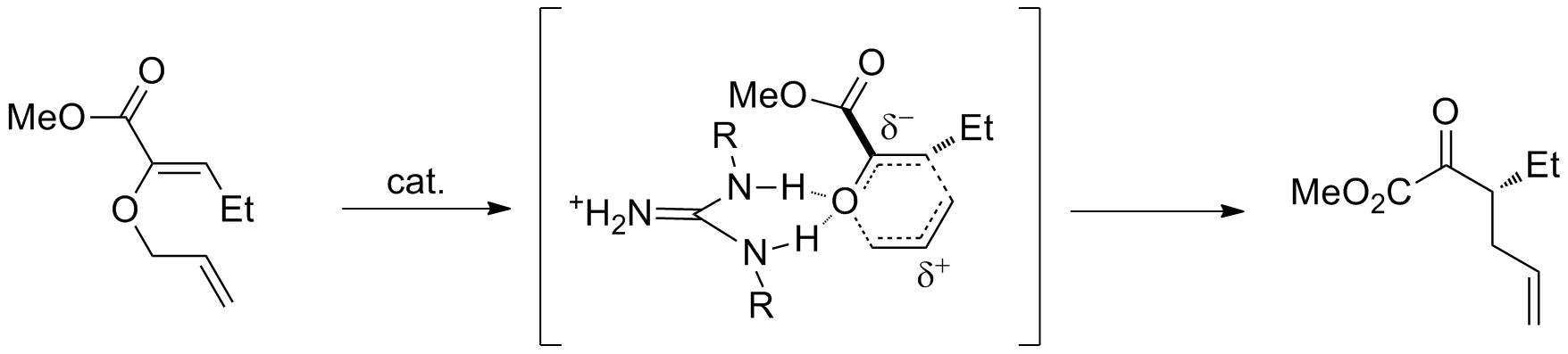

Similarly, negative charge can develop in cycloaddition reactions such as the Diels-Alder reaction, when the partners are appropriately substituted. As a representative example, Rawal and coworkers developed a chiral catalyst based on α,α,α',α'-tetraaryl-2,2-disubstituted 1,3-dioxolane-4,5-dimethanol (TADDOL) that could catalyze Diels-Alder reactions. In the following example, the reaction with a highly electron-rich diene and an electron-poor dienophile is thought to develop significant negative charge on the enal fragment, and is the transition state is stabilized by increased hydrogen bonding to the TADDOL (Ar = 1-naphthyl).

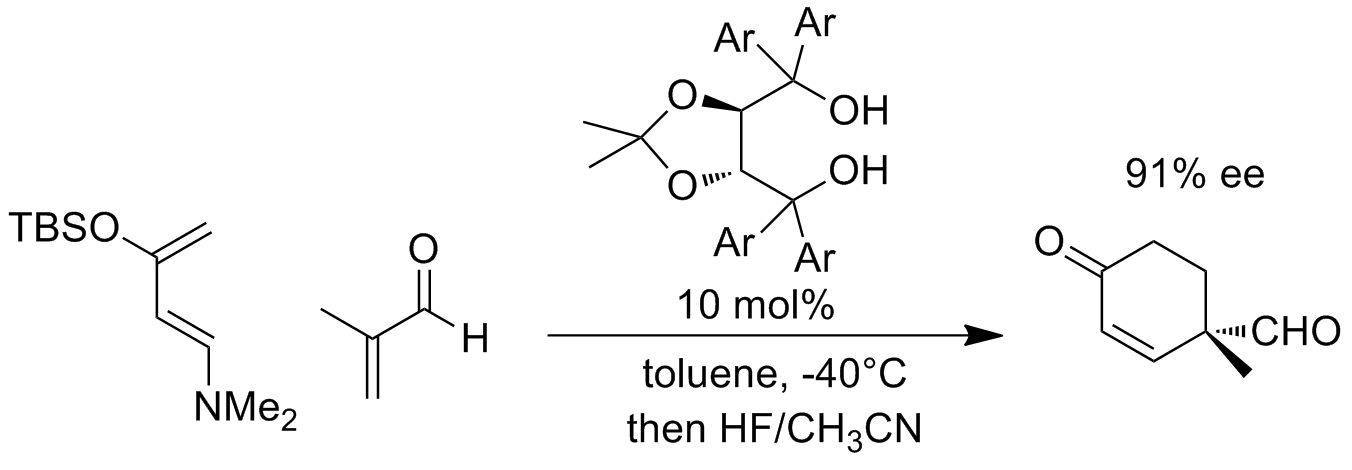

=== Anion binding ===
Hydrogen-bond catalysts can also accelerate reactions by assisting in the formation of electrophilic species through abstracting and coordinating an anion such as a halide. Urea and thiourea catalysts are the most common donors in anion-binding catalysis, and their ability to bind halides and other anions has been well established in the literature. The use of chiral anion-binding catalysts can create an asymmetric ion pair and induce remarkable stereoselectivity.

One of the first reactions proposed to proceed through anion-binding catalysis is the Pictet-Spengler-type cyclization of hydroxy lactams with TMSCl under thiourea catalysis. In the proposed mechanism, after initial substitution of the hydroxyl group with chloride, the key ion pair is formed. The activated iminium ion is closely associated with the chiral thiourea-bound chloride, and intramolecular cyclization proceeds with high stereoselectivity.

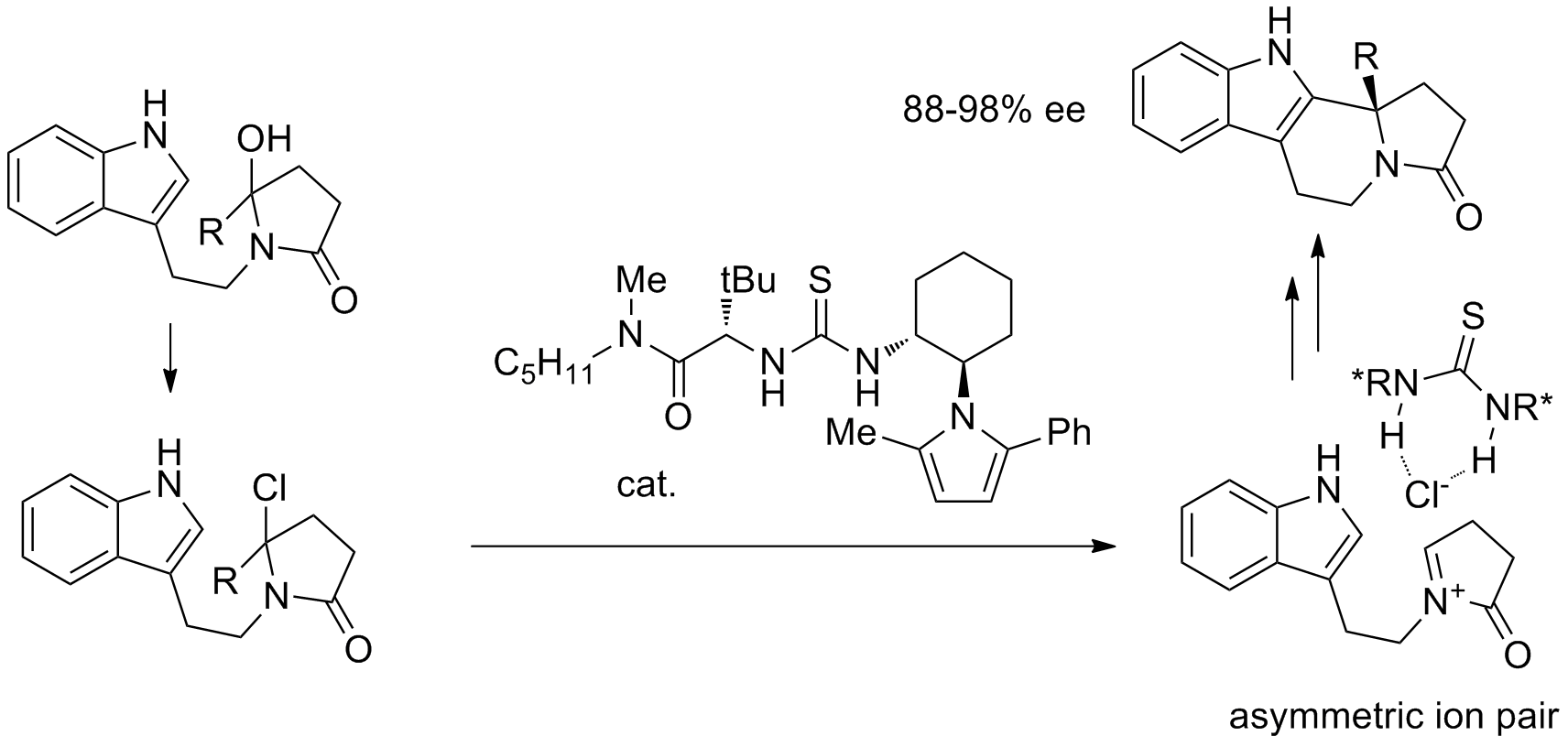

Asymmetric ion pairs can also be attacked in intermolecular reactions. In an interesting example, asymmetric addition of enol silane nucleophiles to oxocarbenium ions can be effected by catalytically forming the oxocarbenium through anion binding. Starting from an acetal, the chloro ether is generated with boron trichloride and reacted with the enol silane and catalyst. The mechanism of formation of the oxocarbenium-thiourea-chloride complex is not fully resolved. It is thought that under the reaction conditions, the chloro ether can epimerize and thiourea can stereoselectively bind chloride to form a closely associated ion pair. This asymmetric ion pair is then attacked by the silane to generate alkylated product.

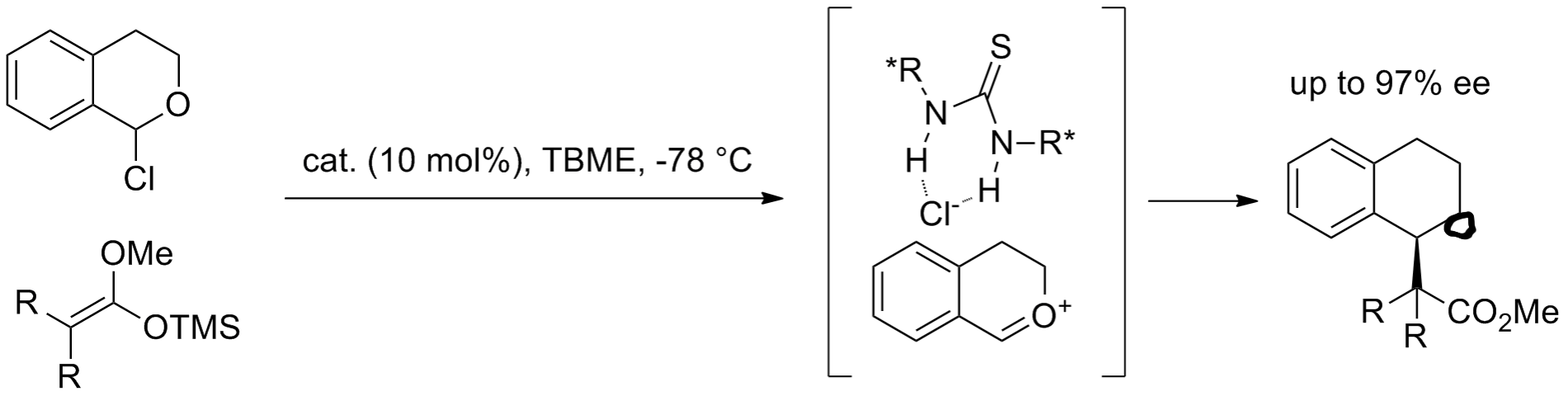

One example of the anion-binding mechanism is the hydrocyanation of imines catalyzed by Jacobsen's amido-thiourea catalyst depicted in the below diagram. This reaction is also one of the most extensively studied through computational, spectroscopic, labeling and kinetic experiments. While direct addition of cyanide to a catalyst-bound imine was considered, an alternative mechanism involving formation of an iminium-cyanide ion pair controlled by catalyst was calculated to have a barrier that is lower by 20 kcal/mol. The proposed most likely mechanism begins with binding of the catalyst to HNC, which exists in equilibrium with HCN. This complex then protonates a molecule of imine, forming an iminium-cyanide ion pair with the catalyst binding and stabilizing the cyanide anion. The iminium is thought to also interact with the amide carbonyl on the catalyst molecule (see bifunctional catalysis below). The bound cyanide anion then rotates, and attacks the iminium through carbon. The investigators conclude that though imine-urea binding was observed through spectroscopy and was supported by early kinetic experiments, imine binding is off-cycle and all evidence points toward this mechanism involving thiourea-bound cyanide.

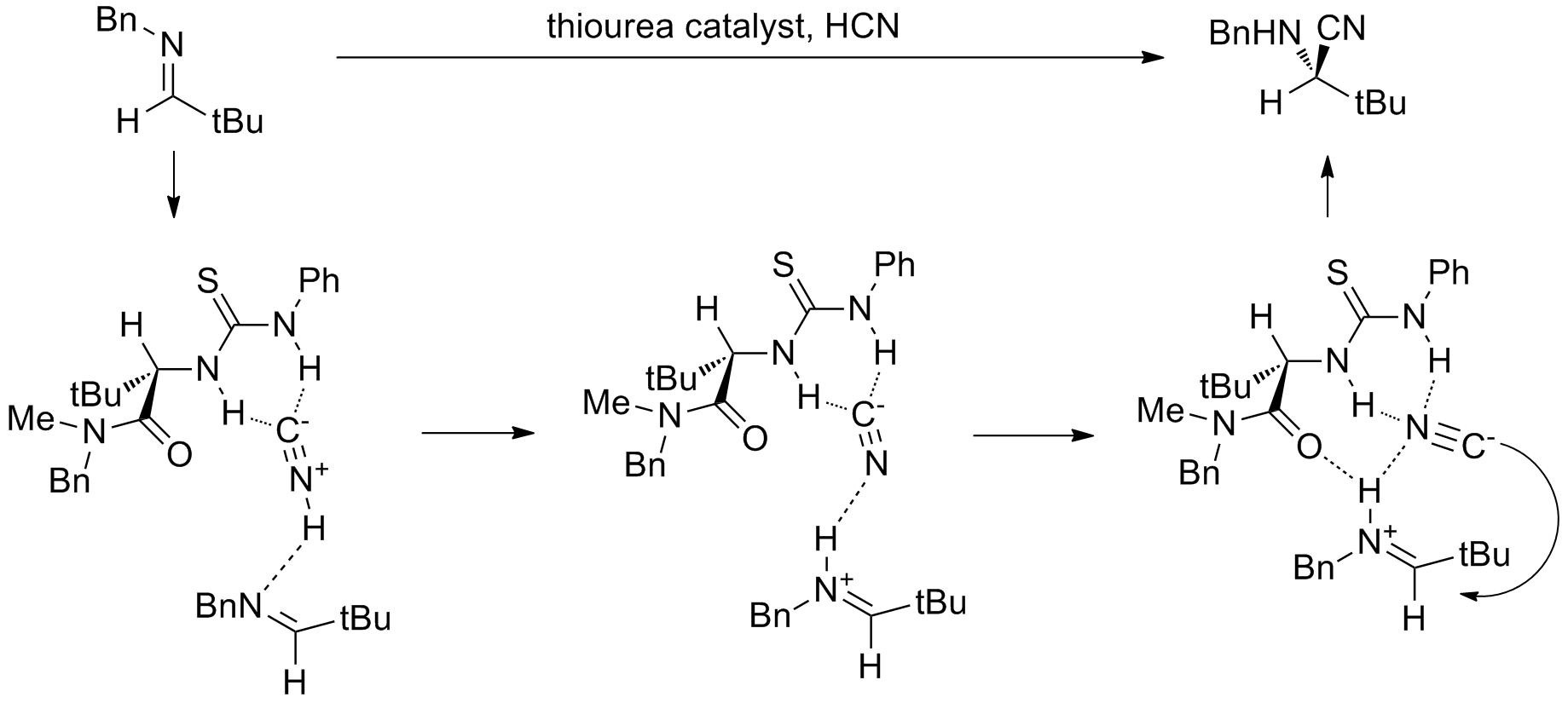

=== Protonation ===
It is often difficult to distinguish between hydrogen-bond catalysis and general acid catalysis. Hydrogen-bond donors can have varying acidity, from mild to essentially strong Brønsted acids like phosphoric acids. Looking at the extent of proton transfer over the course of the reaction is challenging and has not been investigated thoroughly in most reactions. Nevertheless, strong acid catalysts are often grouped with hydrogen-bond catalysts as they represent an extreme on this continuum and their catalytic behaviors share similarities. The mechanism of activation for these reactions involves initial protonation of the electrophilic partner. This has the effect of rendering the substrate more electrophilic and creating an ion pair, through which it is possible to transfer stereochemical information.

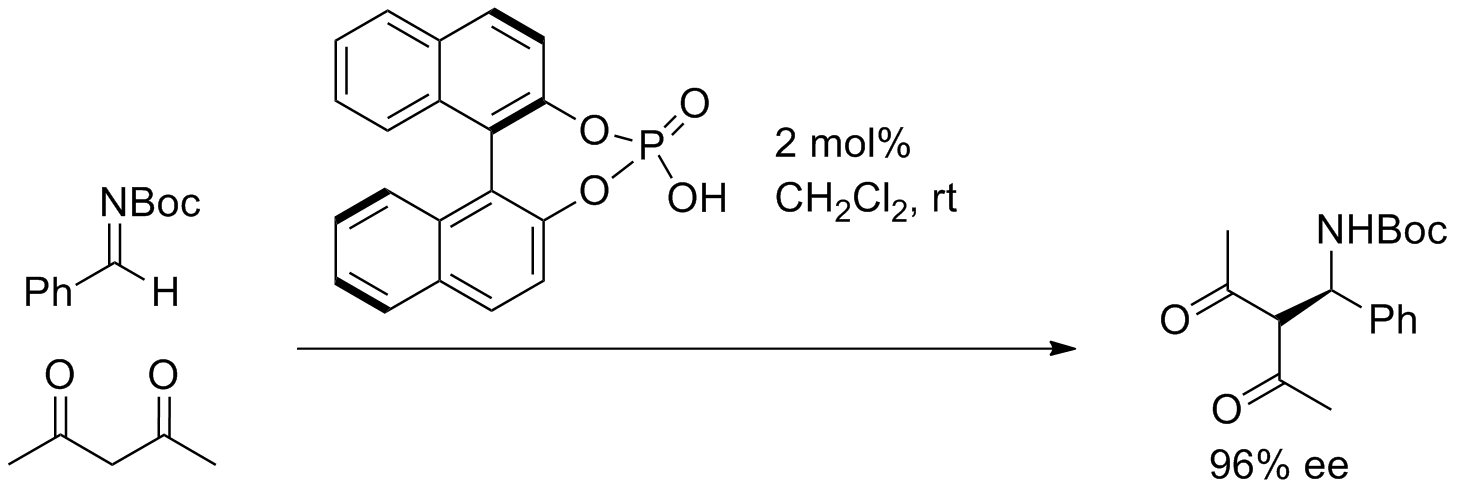

Asymmetric catalysis involving nearly complete protonation of substrate has been effective in Mannich reactions of aromatic aldimines with carbon nucleophiles. In addition, aza-Friedel-Crafts reactions of furans, amidoalkylations of diazocarbonyl compounds, asymmetric hydrophosphonylation of aldimines and transfer hydrogenations have also been reported. Chiral Brønsted acids are often easily prepared from chiral alcohols such as BINOLs, and many are already present in the literature due to their established utility in molecular recognition research.

=== Multifunctional strategies ===
One of the main advantages of hydrogen-bond catalysis is the ability to construct catalysts that engage in multiple non-covalent interactions to promote the reaction. In addition to using hydrogen-bond donors to activate or stabilize a reactive center during the reaction, it is possible to introduce other functional groups, such as Lewis bases, arenes, or addition hydrogen-bonding sites to lend additional stabilization or to influence the other reactive partner.

For instance, the natural enzyme chorismate mutase, which catalyzes the Claisen rearrangement of chorismate, features many other interactions in addition to the hydrogen bonds involved in stabilizing the enolate-like fragment, which is an example of the anionic fragment stabilization strategy discussed above. A key interaction is the stabilization of the other cationic allyl fragment through a cation-pi interaction in the transition state. The use of many additional hydrogen bonds has several putative purposes. The stabilization of multiple hydrogen bonds to the enzyme helps overcome the entropic cost of binding. Additionally, the interactions help hold the substrate in a reactive conformation, and the enzyme-catalyzed reaction has near-zero entropy of activation, while typical Claisen rearrangements in solution have very negative entropies of activation.

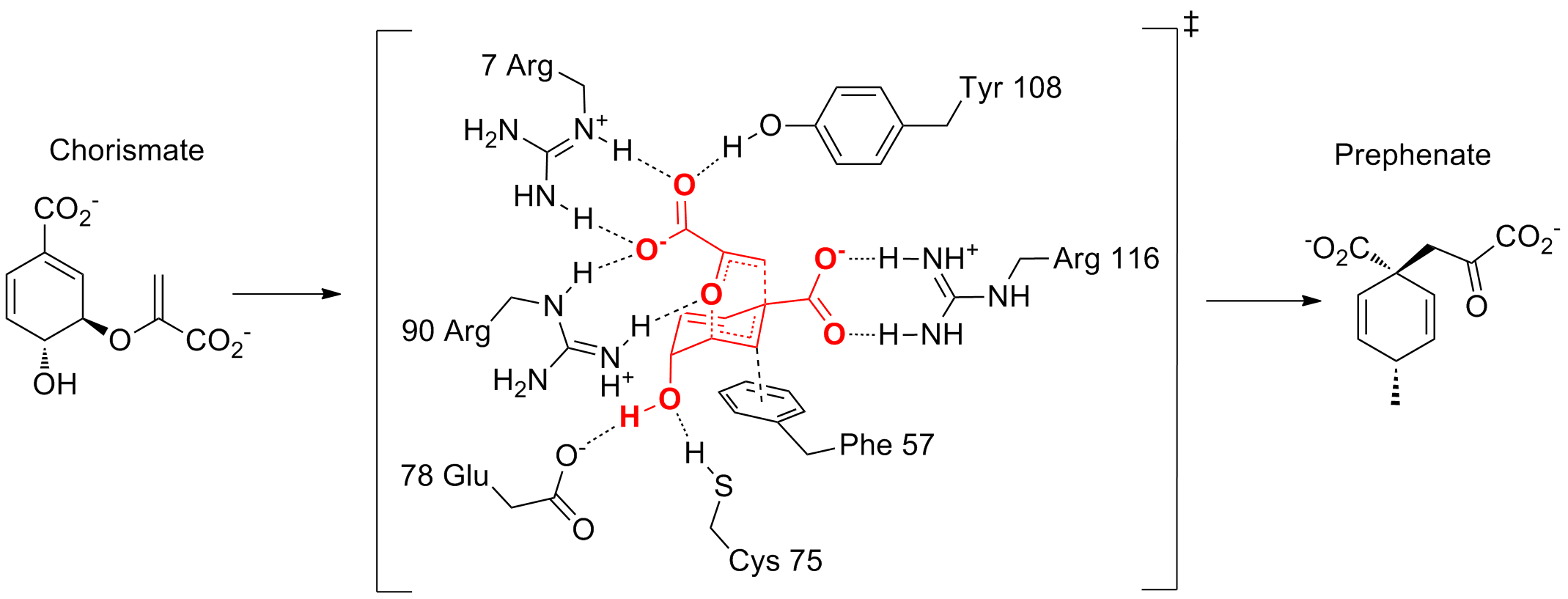

The use of cation-pi interactions has also been implemented in reactions with synthetic catalysts. A combination of anion-binding and cation-pi strategies can be used to effect enantioselective cationic polycyclizations. In the transition state, it is proposed that the thiourea group binds chloride, while the aromatic system stabilizes the associated polyene cation. In support of this, increasing the size of the aromatic ring leads to improvements both in yield and stereoselectivity. The enantioselectivity correlates well with both the polarizability and the quadrupole moment of the aryl group.

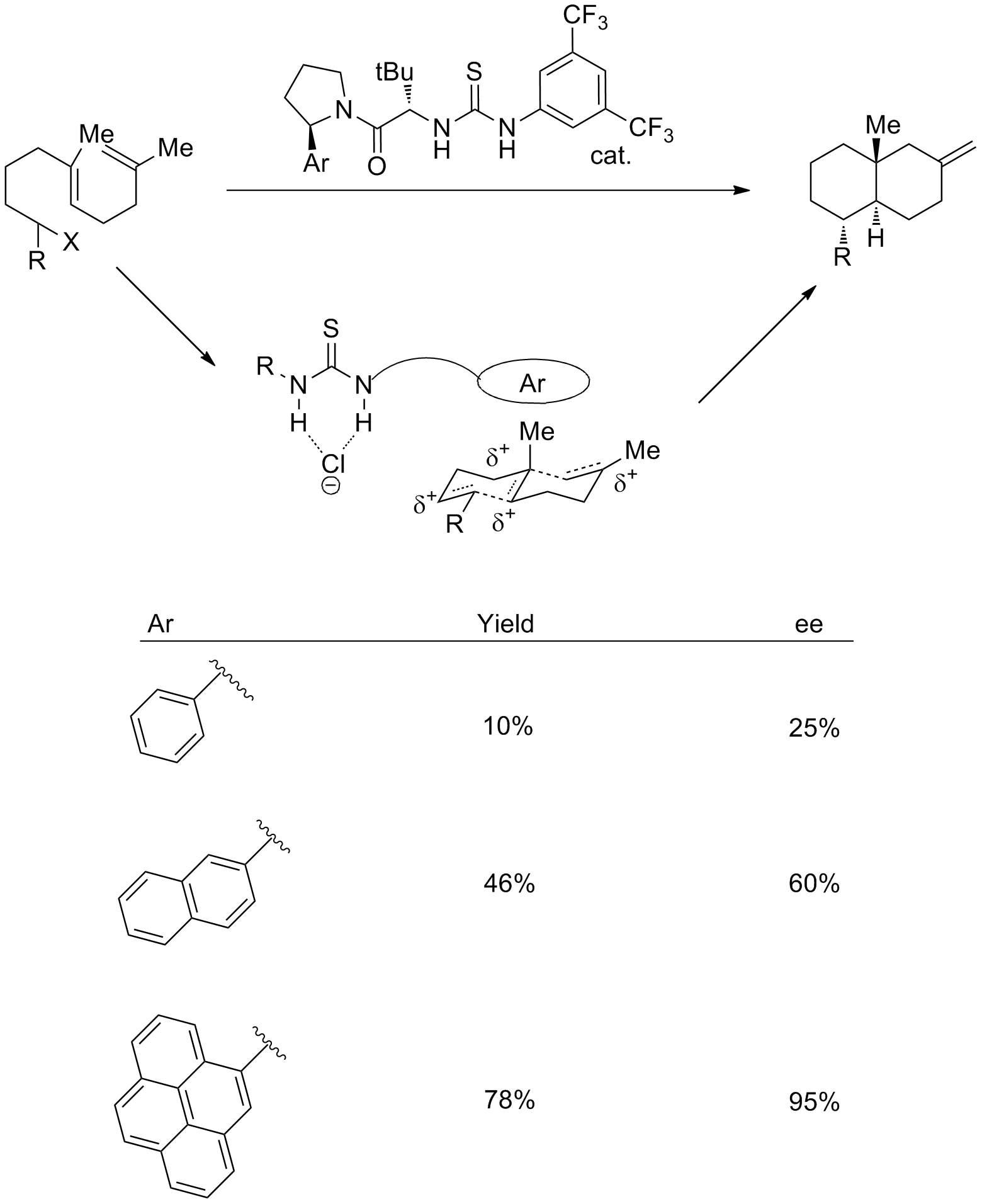

Since such a large number of catalysts and reactions involve binding to electrophiles to stabilize the transition state, many bifunctional catalysts also present a Lewis-basic, hydrogen-bond acceptor site. As a representative example, Deng and coworkers have developed a thiourea-amine catalyst capable of promoting stereoselective Michael reactions. In the proposed transition state, one of the thiourea N–H donors is coordinated to the Michael acceptor and will stabilize the negative charge buildup. The basic nitrogen lone pair acts as a hydrogen-bond acceptor to coordinate the nucleophile, but in the transition state acts as a general base to promote the nucleophilic enolate addition.

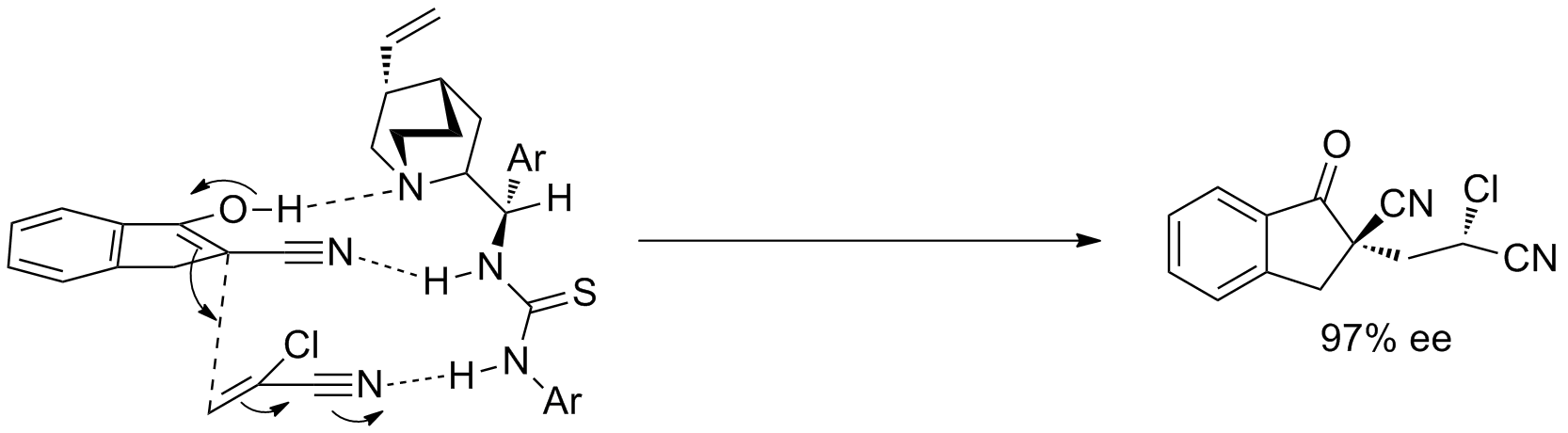

This motif of engaging both the nucleophilic and electrophilic partners in a reaction and stabilizing them in the transition state is very common in bifunctional catalysis and many more examples can be found in the article on thiourea organocatalysis.

A relatively new strategy of using synthetic oligopeptides to perform catalysis has yielded many examples of catalytic methods. Peptides feature multiple potential sites for hydrogen bonding and it is generally not understood how these engage substrate or how they promote reaction. Peptides have the advantage of being extremely modular and often these catalysts are screened in large arrays. Highly enantioselective reactions have been discovered in this manner such as the aldol reaction depicted below.

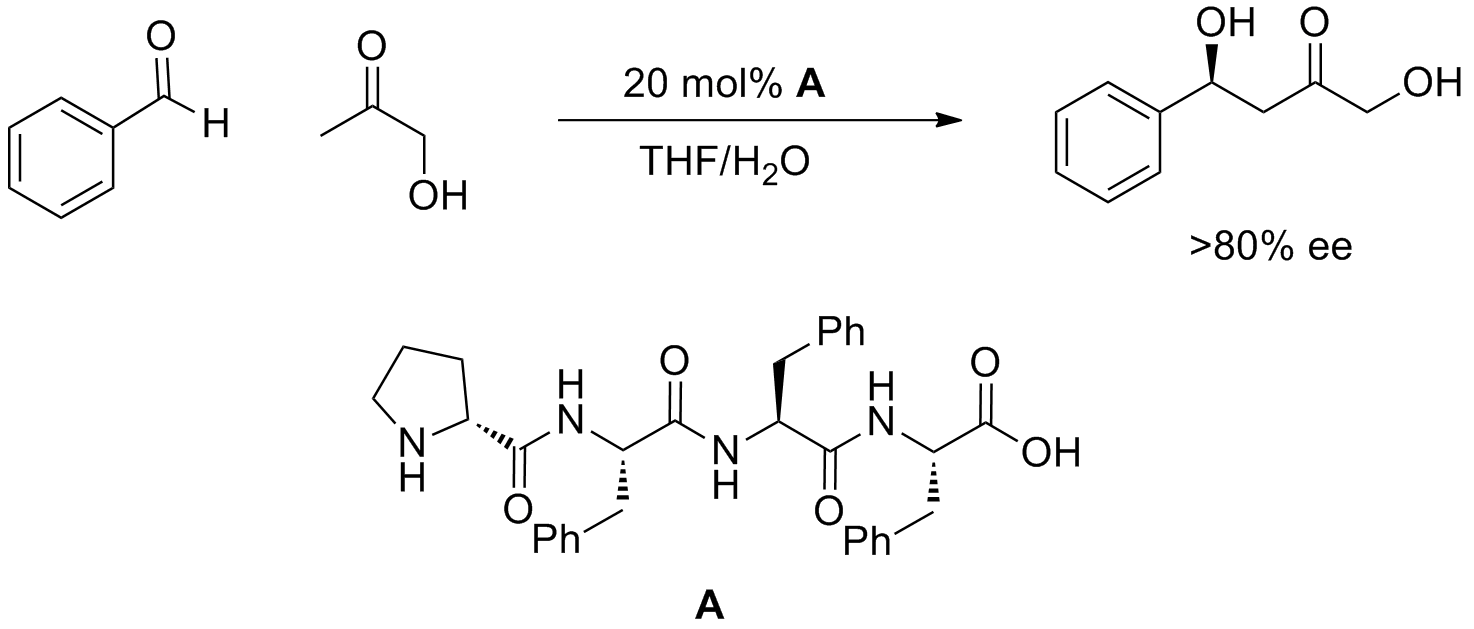

Other transformations catalyzed by synthetic peptides include hydrocyanation, acylation, conjugate additions, aldehyde-imine couplings, aldol reaction and bromination. Although the nature of the transition states is unclear, in many examples small changes in the catalyst structure have dramatic effects on reactivity. It is hypothesized that a large number of hydrogen bonds both within the peptide and between catalyst and substrate must cooperate to meet the geometrical requirements for catalysis. Beyond this, understanding of catalyst design and mechanism has not yet progressed beyond requiring the testing of libraries of peptides.

== Catalyst design ==
=== Privileged structures ===
The types of hydrogen-bond donors used in catalysis vary widely from reaction to reaction, even among similar catalytic strategies. While specific systems are often studied and optimized extensively, a general understanding of the optimal donor for a reaction or the relationship between catalyst structure and reactivity is greatly lacking. It is not yet practical to rationally design structures to promote a desired reaction with the desired selectivity. However, contemporary hydrogen-bond catalysis is primarily focused on a few types of systems that experimentally seem to be effective in a variety of situations. These are termed "privileged structures". However, it is worth noting that other structural scaffolds and motifs have also shown promising results, such as metal-coordinated hydrogen-bond donors.

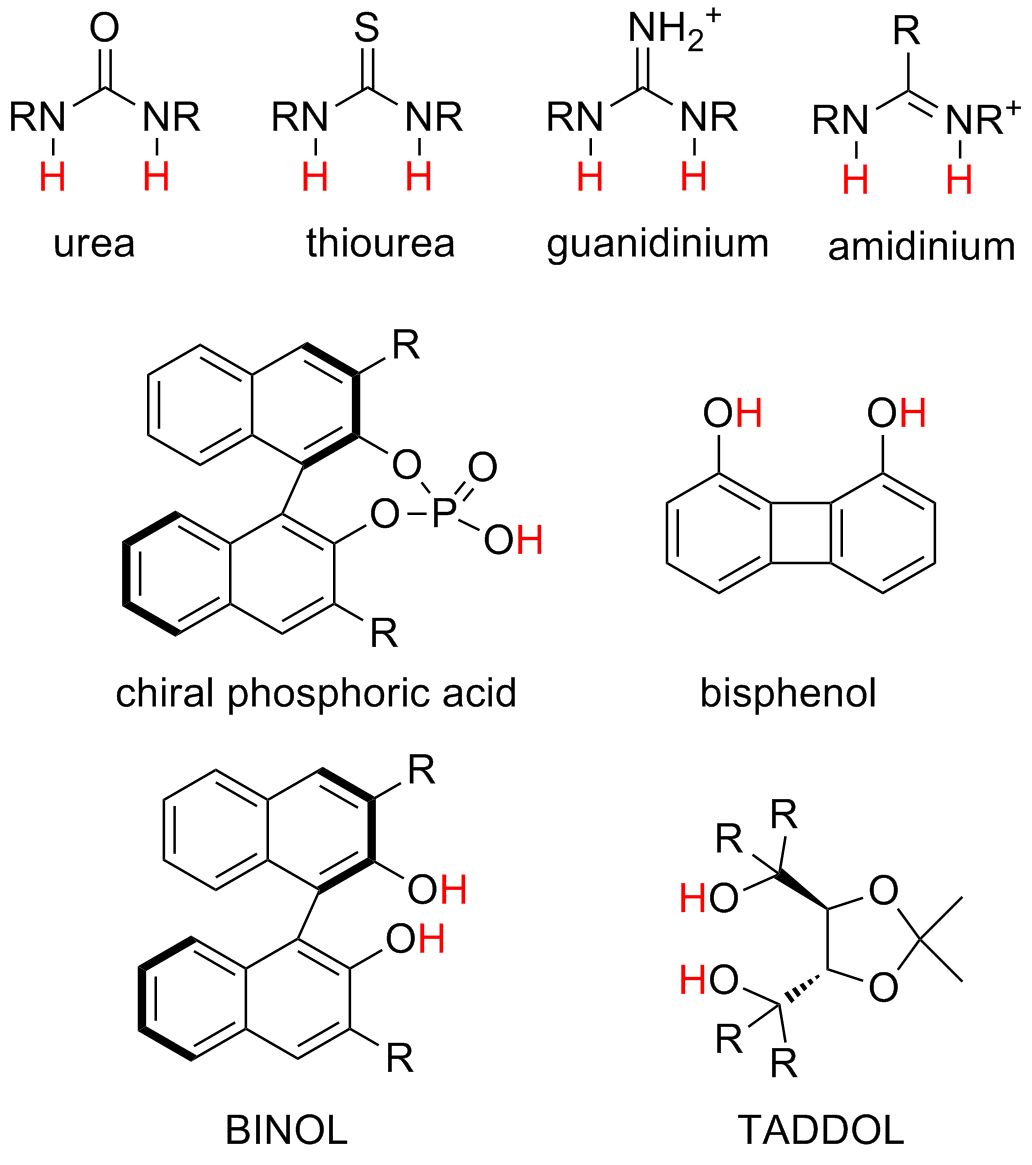

- Ureas and thioureas are by far the most common structures and can stabilize a variety of negatively charged intermediates, as well as engage in anion-binding catalysis. Bifunctional urea and thiourea catalysis are abundant in the literature. Thioureas are often found to be stronger hydrogen-bond donors (i.e., more acidic) than ureas because their amino groups are more positively charged. Quantum chemical analyses revealed that this counterintuitive phenomenon, which is not explainable by the relative electronegativities of O and S, results from the effective steric size of the chalcogen atoms.
- Guanidinium and amidinium ions are structural relatives of ureas and thioureas and can catalyze similar reactions but, by virtue of their positive charge, are stronger donors and much more acidic. The mechanism of guanidinium and amidinium catalysis is thought to often involve partial protonation of substrate.
- Diol catalysts are thought to engage substrate with a single hydrogen bond, with the other hydroxyl participating in an internal hydrogen bond. These are some of the earliest hydrogen-bond catalysts investigated. They are most commonly used in stabilizing partial anionic charge in transition states, for example coordinating to aldehyde dienophiles in hetero-Diels-Alder reactions.
- Phosphoric acid catalysts are the most common strong acid catalysts and work by formation of chiral ion pairs with basic substrates such as imines.
- Squaramide catalysts are easily prepared from starting materials like methyl squarate, possess high activities under low catalyst loadings. Squaramide catalysis can be a replacement for thiourea organocatalysis in some scenarios. Squaramides have higher affinity for halide ions than thiourea.
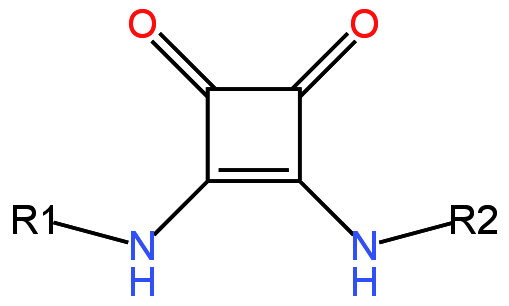

=== Catalyst tuning ===
In general, acidity of donor sites correlates well with the strength of the donor. For example, it is a common strategy to add electron-withdrawing aryl substituents on a thiourea catalyst, which can increase its acidity and thus the strength of its hydrogen bonding. However, it is still unclear how donor strength correlates with desired reactivity. Importantly, more acidic catalysts are not necessarily more effective. For instance, ureas are less acidic than thioureas by roughly 6 pKa units, but it is not generally true that ureas are significantly worse are catalyzing reactions.

Furthermore, the effect of varying substituents on the catalyst is rarely well understood. Small substituent changes can completely change reactivity or selectivity. An example of this was in the optimization studies of a bifunctional Strecker reaction catalyst, one of the first well-studied thiourea catalysts. Specifically, varying the X substituent on the salicylaldimine substituent, it was found that typical electron-withdrawing or electron-donating substituents had little effect on the rate, but ester substituents such as acetate or pivaloate seemed to cause noticeable rate acceleration. This observation is difficult to rationalize given that the X group is far from the reactive center during the course of the reaction and electronics do not seem to be the cause.

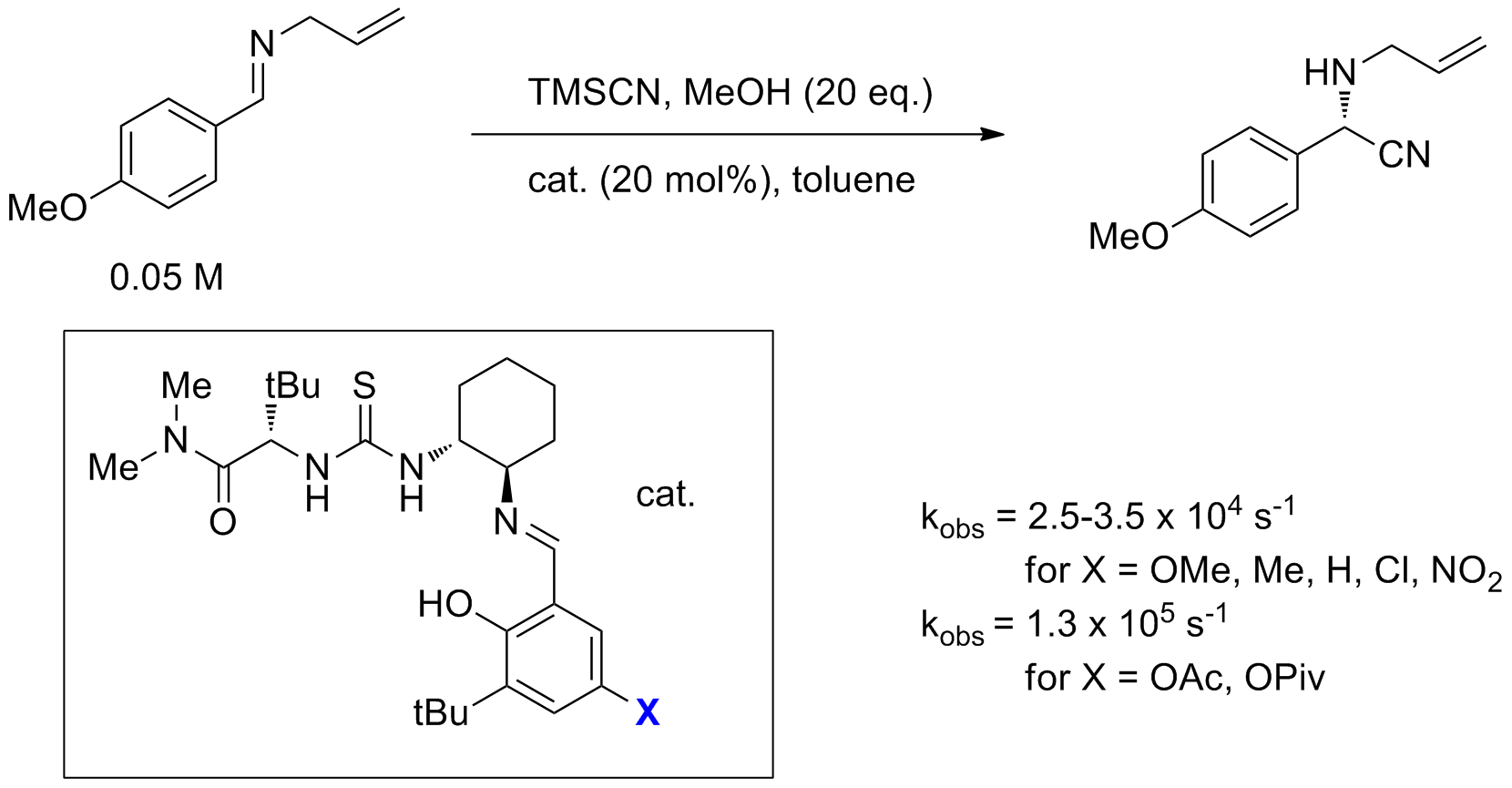

== Synthetic applications ==
=== Natural product synthesis ===
To date, there have been few examples of hydrogen-bond catalysis in the synthesis of natural products despite the large number of reactions being discovered. Generally, with high required catalyst loading and often extreme substrate specificity, hydrogen-bond catalysis is not yet useful.

In the Jacobsen synthesis of (+)-yohimbine, an indole alkaloid, an early enantioselective Pictet-Spengler reaction using a pyrrole-substituted thiourea catalyst produced gram-scale quantities of product in 94% ee and 81% yield. The remainder of the synthesis was short, using a reductive amination and an intramolecular Diels-Alder reaction.

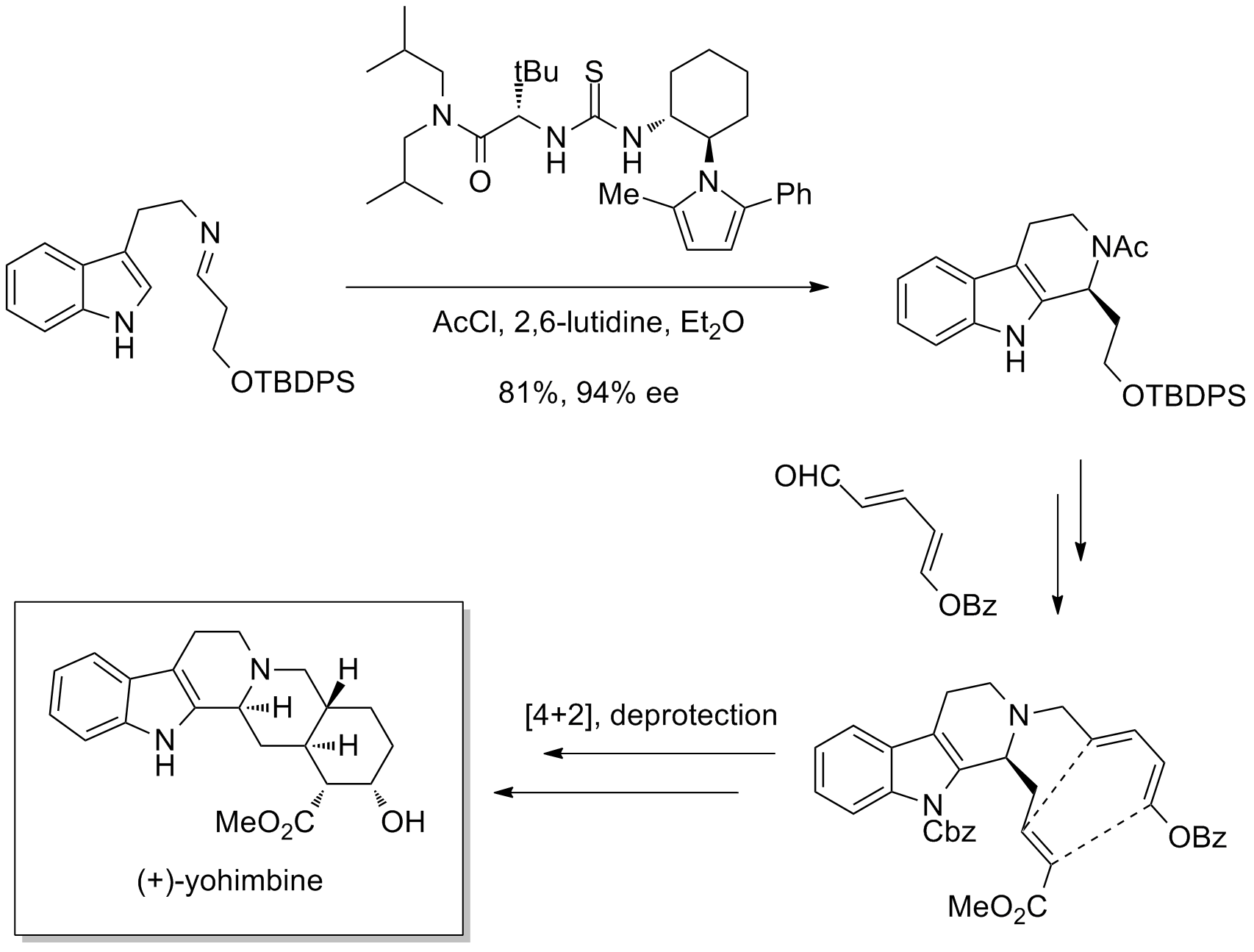

In 2008, Takemoto disclosed a concise synthesis of (−)-epibatidine that relied on a Michael cascade, catalyzed by a bifunctional catalyst. After initial asymmetric Michael addition to the β-nitrostyrene, intramolecular Michael addition furnishes the cyclic ketoester product in 75% ee. Standard functional group manipulations and an intramolecular cyclization yields the natural product.

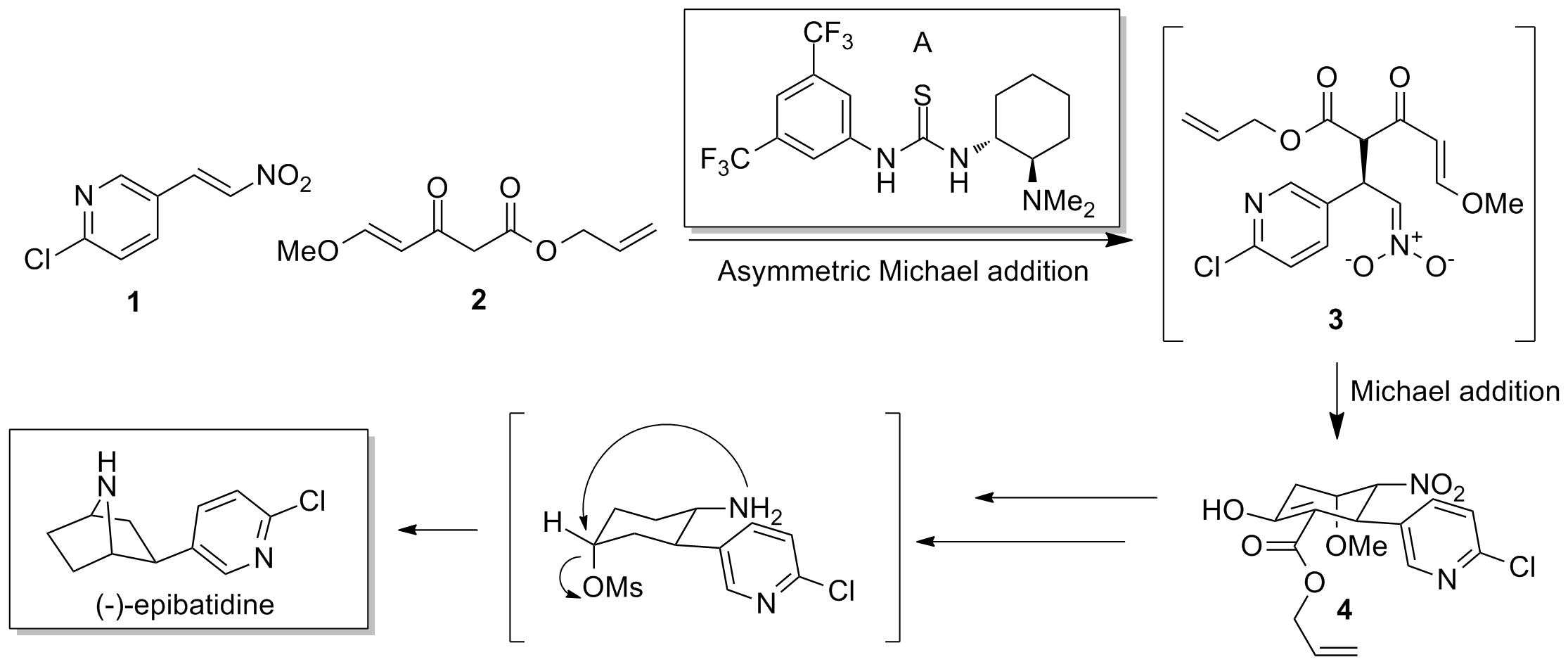

=== Scalable synthesis of building blocks ===
Aside from total synthesis, hydrogen-bond catalysis has been applied to the bulk synthesis of difficult-to-access chiral small molecules. An example is the gram-scale Strecker synthesis of unnatural amino acids using thiourea catalysis, reported in the journal Nature in 2009. The catalyst, whether polymer-bound or homogeneous, is derived from natural tert-leucine and can catalyze (4 mol% catalyst loading) the formation of the Strecker product from benzhydryl amines and aqueous HCN. Hydrolysis of the nitrile and deprotections produces pure unnatural tert-leucine in 84% overall yield and 99% ee.

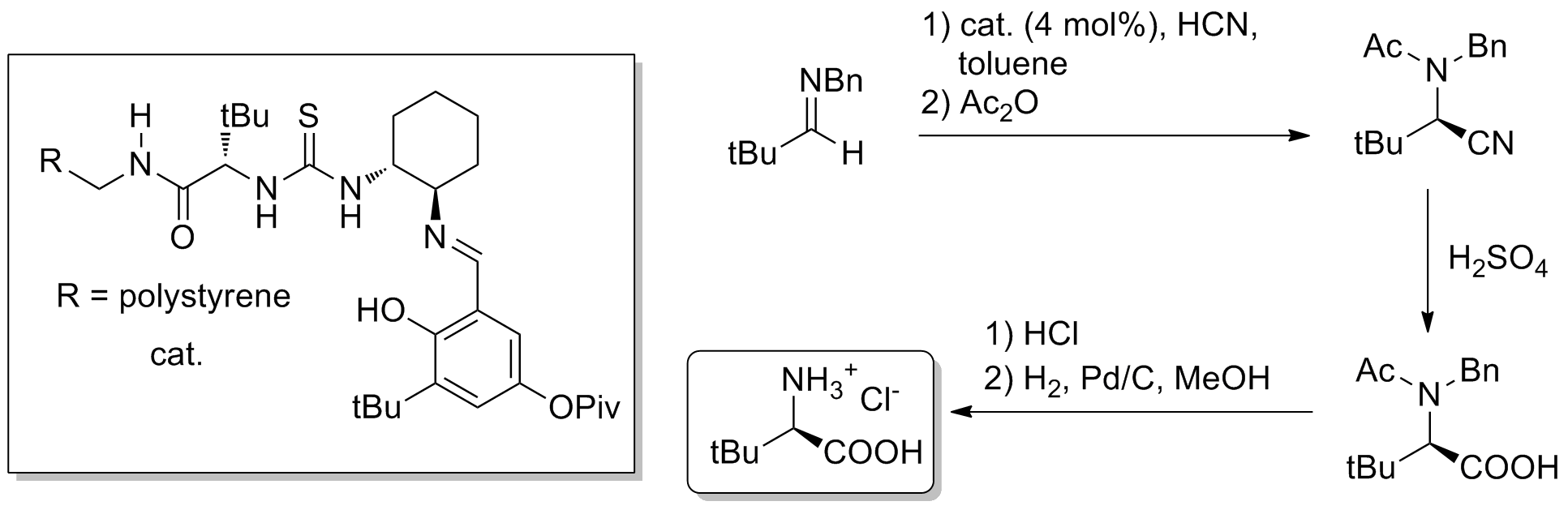

== See also ==
- Organocatalysis
- Thiourea organocatalysis
- Hydrogen bond
