= Squaramide catalysis =

Use of squaramides as hydrogen-bond catalyst to accelerate reactions

Within the area of organocatalysis, squaramide catalysis describes the use of squaramides to accelerate and stereochemically alter organic transformations. The effects arise through hydrogen-bonding interactions between the substrate and the squaramide, unlike classic catalysts, and is thus a type of hydrogen-bond catalyst. The scope of these small-molecule H-bond donors termed squaramide organocatalysis covers both non-stereoselective and stereoselective applications.

== Structure ==
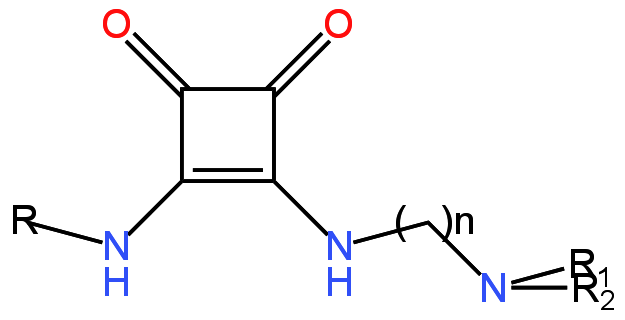
General structure of squaramide organocatalyst

A squaramide organocatalyst typically contains the squaramide group and a hydrogen bond donor which is usually a tertiary amine group. The 3,5-bis(trifluoromethyl)phenyl-group is commonly used for the R group. For enantioselective squaramide catalysis, chirality is induced via the tertiary amine group. There are cases where both sides of the squaramide are tertiary amines.

== Catalyst-substrate interactions ==
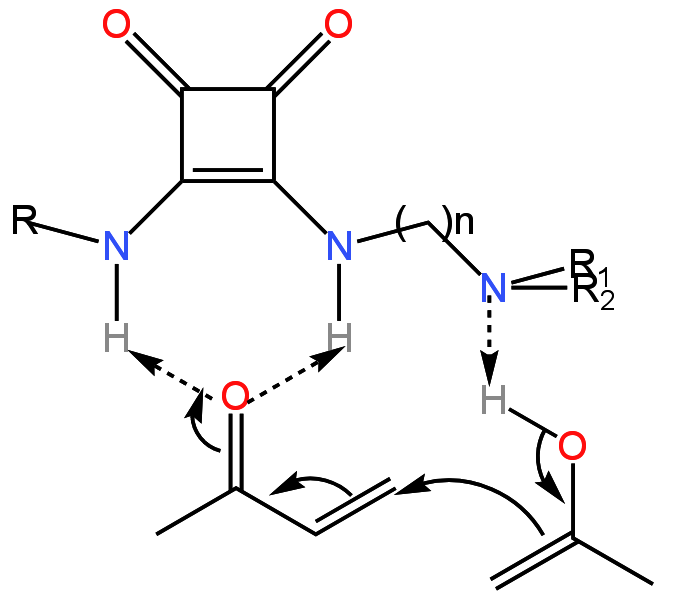
Interaction between squaramide catalyst and substrate exemplified by the conjugate addition of an enolate to an unsaturated ketone

The interaction between the substrate and the catalyst can be seen in the image above, with the electrophile being bound to the squaramide part and the protonated nucleophile to the amine part (which increases nucleophilicity). However, the position of the nucleophile and electrophile switch when the electrophile can only form one hydrogen bond, as in the case of most imines.

== Advantages of squaramide organocatalysts ==
Squaramide catalysts are easily prepared from starting materials like methyl squarate, possess high activities under low catalyst loadings. Squaramide catalysis can be a replacement for thiourea organocatalysis in some scenarios. Squaramides have higher affinity for halide ions than thiourea.Aqueous mediums can be used.

== Scope ==
H-bond accepting substrates include carbonyl compounds imines, Michael acceptors, and epoxides. The nucleophile can be nitroalkanes, enolates, and even phenols (resulting in electrophilic aromatic substitution). Subsequent cascade reactions are possible.

== History ==
Squaramides have been synthesized in 1966. Squaramide catalysts are developed in 2008 by Jeremiah P. Malerich, Koji Hagihara, and Viresh H. Rawal.

== Catalysts ==
From the general structure of squaramide catalysts, a number of catalysts have been developed, most with the aim to enable chiral catalysis.

The first squaramide catalyst developed. It functions as a bifunctional catalyst.Some later catalysts are based on such a structure by removing the methylene group on the left to make a 3,5-bis(trifluoromethyl)phenyl-group or adding a 6-methoxy group on the quinoline.

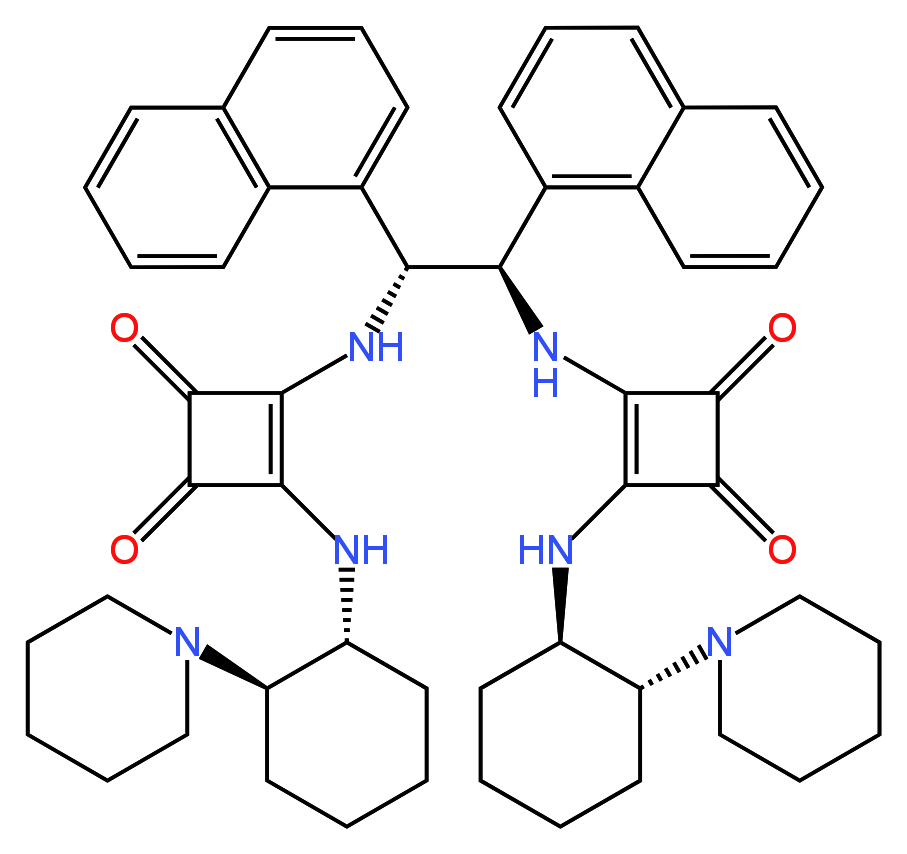
Zlotin's bifunctional squaramide catalyst.

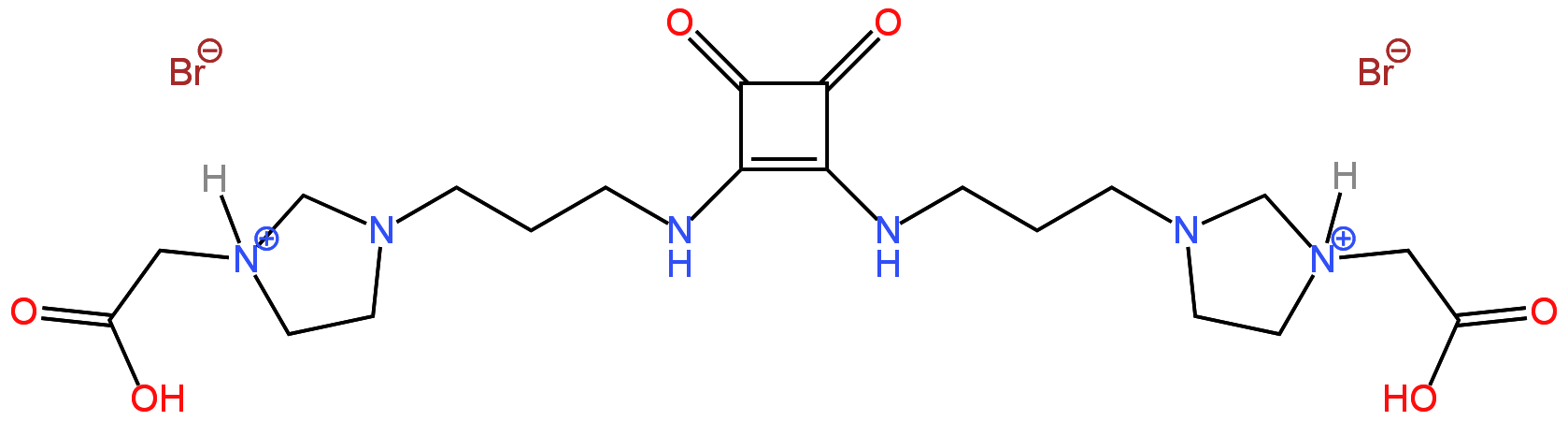
Ionic liquid squaramide catalyst for catalyzing epoxide opening reaction. It can be directly separated via decantation.Note that it is achiral.

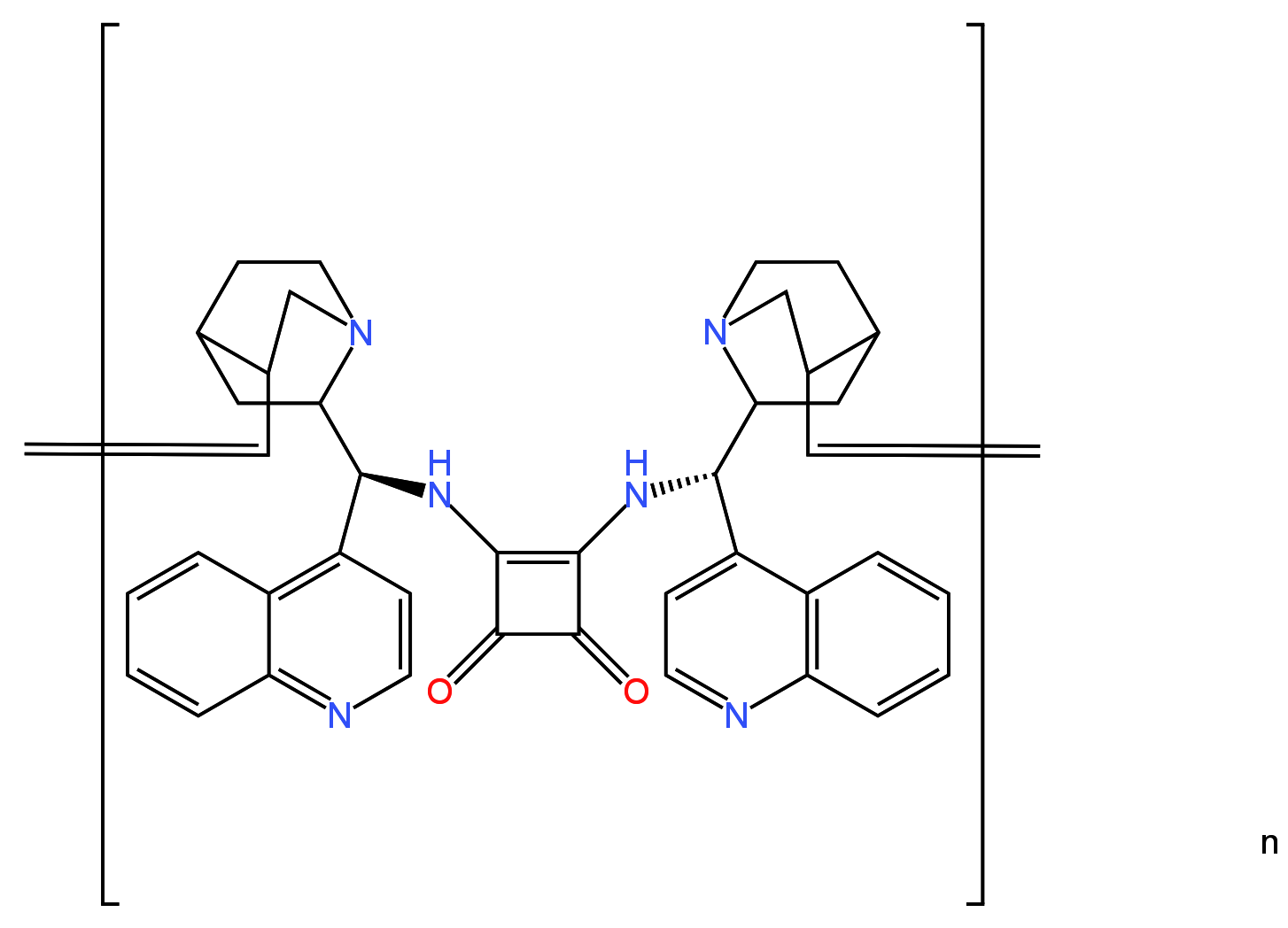
Polymeric squaramide catalyst that is only soluble in strongly polar solvents like DMF and DMSO, and thus can be easily separated.

== See also ==
- Organocatalysis
- Hydrogen-bond catalysis
- Thiourea catalysis
- Squaramide
