= C4H4N2O2 =

The molecular formula C_{4}H_{4}N_{2}O_{2} (molar mass: 112.09 g/mol, exact mass: 112.0273 u) may refer to:

- Cellocidin (2-butynediamide)
- Maleic hydrazide
- Squaramide
- Uracil
