= Asymmetric addition of dialkylzinc compounds to aldehydes =

Asymmetric addition of dimethylzinc to benzaldehyde

In asymmetric addition of dialkylzinc compounds to aldehydes, dialkyl zinc compounds can be used to perform asymmetric additions to aldehydes, generating substituted alcohols as products (See Barbier reaction). Chiral alcohols are prevalent in many natural products, drugs, and other important organic molecules. Dimethyl zinc is often used with an asymmetric amino alcohol, amino thiol, or other ligand to affect enantioselective additions to aldehydes and ketones. One of the first examples of this process, reported by Noyori and colleagues, features the use of the amino alcohol ligand (−)-3-exo-dimethylaminoisobornenol along with dimethylzinc to add a methyl group asymmetrically to benzaldehyde (see figure). Many ligands have been developed for binding zinc during addition reactions. TADDOLs (tetraaryl-1,3-dioxolane-4,5-dimethanols), which are derived from chiral tartaric acid, are a class of diol ligands often used to bind titanium, but have been adopted for zinc addition chemistry. These ligands require relatively low catalyst loadings, and can achieve up to 99% ee in dialkylzinc additions to aromatic and aliphatic aldehydes. Martens and colleagues have used azetidine alcohols as ligands for asymmetric zinc additions. The researchers found that when paired with catalytic n-butyllithium, diethylzinc can add to aromatic aldehydes with ee in the range of 94-100%.

Many studies have shown that in zinc addition reactions, the enantioselectivity is not linearly correlated with catalyst enantiomeric purity. Researchers propose that this is because the kinetics of the reaction are controlled by the relative concentrations of hetero and homodimeric catalytic complexes; that is, the system displays autocatalysis because the product alcohol itself acts as an asymmetric ligand on zinc.
