= Nitro-Mannich reaction =

Chemical reaction

The nitro-Mannich reaction (or aza-Henry reaction) is the nucleophilic addition of a nitroalkane (or the corresponding nitronate anion) to an imine, resulting in the formation of a beta-nitroamine. With the reaction involving the addition of an acidic carbon nucleophile to a carbon-heteroatom double bond, the nitro-Mannich reaction is related to some of the most fundamental carbon-carbon bond forming reactions in organic chemistry, including the aldol reaction, Henry reaction (nitro-aldol reaction) and Mannich reaction.

Summary of enolate and nitronate nucleophilic additions to imines and aldehydes/ketones.

Although extensive research has been conducted into the aforementioned reactions, the nitro-Mannich reaction has been studied to a far lesser extent even though it has been known for well over 100 years. Significant attention only started to develop after the report of Anderson and co-workers at the turn of the century, and has since resulted in a wide range of novel methodologies. The interest into the nitro-Mannich reaction stems from the synthetic utility of the beta-nitroamine products. They can be further manipulated by various methods, including reductive removal of the nitro group allowing access to monoamines, reduction of the nitro group affords 1,2-diamines and conversion of the nitro group into a carbonyl functionality furnishes beta-aminocarbonyl compounds.

Selected examples of the synthetic utility of beta-nitroamines synthesised via nitro- Mannich reactions.

== History ==
=== Early Examples of the Nitro-Mannich Reaction ===
The first nitro-Mannich reaction was reported by Louis Henry in 1896. In this report, Henry described the addition of nitroalkanes to an imine derived from hemiaminal. Elimination of water forms in-situ an imine, which then reacts with the nitro group (as a nitronate ion) to form a beta-nitroamine that can subsequently react further forming one of the two adducts. Although this is the first report of the nitro-Mannich reaction, no yields of the products were given.

After Henry’s seminal report, Mousset and Duden made contributions to the field by studying the addition of branched nitroalkanes to hemiaminals using the same procedures reported by Henry. An example of nitro group reduction to an amine using SnCl_{2} and HCl was also disclosed by Duden and co-workers, thus representing the first use of the nitro-Mannich reaction to prepare polyamines. The next report did not appear until 1931, when Cerf de Mauny conducted a thorough study of Henry’s original work using hemiaminals. The scope of the reaction was extended to higher order nitroalkanes affording a beta-nitroamine in excellent yields.

The next contributions appeared in 1946, when Senkus and Johnson independently reported their studies into the nitro-Mannich reaction. Senkus and co-workers illustrated that nitroalkanes may react with methanal (formaldehyde) and substituted primary amines in the presence of sodium sulfate (Na_{2}SO_{4}) to afford a variety of substituted beta-nitroamines in moderate to good yields. When using primary nitroalkane substrates, double addition of the nitroalkane to the imine was observed, but this could be avoided by employing secondary nitroalkanes. The study reported by Johnson and co-workers also employed formaldehyde, but this was used in conjunction with a selection of secondary amines, furnishing the corresponding beta-nitroamines in moderate to good yields. Both authors also reduced the nitro group to an amine functionality using Raney Nickel.

Up until this point, all of the nitro-Mannich methodologies reported had used imines that were formed in situ from an aldehyde and an amine. In 1950, Hurd and Strong reported the first nitro-Mannich reaction using a preformed imine. Exposing an imine to a nitroalkane afforded a substituted beta-nitroamines in moderate yields. The moderate yields obtained when using the preformed imine could possibly be attributed to a competing decomposition pathway of the imine or the product.

These early nitro-Mannich methodologies have been used by a number of groups for the synthesis of a variety of heterocyclic products, conjugated nitroalkenes (via elimination of the amino group) and dinitroamines.

=== Non-Enantioselective Nitro-Mannich Reactions ===
Although the nitro-Mannich reaction enables access to synthetically useful beta-nitroamine motifs, the lack of selectivity in their synthesis remained a significant problem. Interest in the field started to increase considerably after Anderson and co-workers reported the first diastereoselective acyclic nitro-Mannich reaction. A nitroalkane and n-butyllithium (nBuLi) were combined at -78 °C to give the corresponding nitronate ions. A selection of N-PMB imines were then added to the reaction mixture and after quenching with acetic acid, the beta-nitroamine products were afforded in good yields with moderate to good diastereoselectivities.

The authors then converted the beta-nitroamines into unprotected 1,2-diamines via a two step procedure. Firstly, the nitro group was reduced to amines using samarium iodide, followed by PMB removal in the presence of ceric ammonium nitrate. The same group later reported improvements to this methodology and expanded these preliminary results in further publications.

In 2000, Anderson and co-workers reported the racemic nitro-Mannich reaction of TMS-protected nitronate with N-PMB or N-PMP imines catalysed by Sc(OTf)_{3}. The authors first attempted the nitro-Mannich reaction using lithium-nitronates, however no product was formed using these conditions. As a result, the TMS-protected nitronate was used in conjunction with Scandium(III) trifluoromethanesulfonate [Sc(OTf)_{3}] (4 mol%) to afford the beta-nitroamine products in moderate to excellent yields for a range of alkyl and aryl N-PMB and N-PMP protected imines.

Following Anderson’s report, Qian and co-workers described the ytterbium(III) isopropylate [Yb(OiPr)_{3}] catalysed nitro-Mannich reaction of N-sulfonyl imines and nitromethane. Using mild reactions conditions, the β-nitroamines bearing electron-rich and electron-poor aryl substituents were furnished in excellent yields after short reaction times.

=== Direct Metal Catalysed Enantioselective Nitro-Mannich Reactions ===
The first enantioselective metal catalysed nitro-Mannich reaction was reported by Shibasaki and co-workers in 1999. The authors used a binaphthol ligated Yb/K heterobimetallic complex (Shibasaki catalyst) to induce enantiocontrol in the reaction, furnishing β-nitroamines in moderate to good yields with good enantioselectivities. However, nitromethane was the only nitroalkane that could be used with the heterobimetallic complex and the reactions were very slow (2.5–7 days) even when using a relatively high catalyst loading of 20 mol%.

Building on the work of Shibasaki, Jørgensen and co-workers reported the asymmetric nitro-Mannich reaction of nitroalkanes and a N-PMP-α-iminoesters. Catalysed by Cu(II)-BOX 52 and triethylamine (Et_{3}N), the reaction afforded β-nitro-α-aminoesters in good yields with excellent enantiocontrol (up to 99% ee). The reaction tolerates a selection of nitroalkanes but is limited exclusively to N-PMP-α-iminoesters. The authors propose that the reaction proceeds via the chair-like transition structure, where both the N-PMP-α-iminoester and the nitronate anion bind to the Cu(II)-BOX complex.

In 2007, Feng and co-workers reported that CuOTf used in conjunction with the shown chiral N-oxide ligand and DIPEA is an efficient catalytic system for the enantioselective nitro-Mannich reaction of nitromethane with N-sulfonyl imines. Combining all of the reagents in tetrahydrofuran at –40 °C resulted in the formation of β-nitroamines in excellent yields (up to 99%) and good enantioselectivities for a variety of substituted aryls groups. The postulated intermediate complex is similar to the transition structure proposed by Jørgensen and co-workers, where the ligated copper species binds to the N-sulfonyl imine. A hydrogen bonding interaction is proposed to exist between the amide NH and the nitronate species.

Around the same time as the report of Feng, Shibasaki and co-workers reported one of the most successful enantioselective nitro-Mannich reactions, catalysed by the shown Cu/Sm heterobimetallic complex. Combining N-Boc protected imines and nitroalkanes resulted in moderate to excellent yields and good to excellent enantioselectivities of the products. Interestingly, the nitro-Mannich reaction catalysed by complex affords syn-β-nitroamines, whereas most other enantioselective methodologies favour anti-β-nitroamines. The authors later reported an improved version of the protocol and proposed a mechanistic rational to account for the observed syn diastereoselectivity.

== Organocatalysed enantioselective Nitro-Mannich reactions ==
Since the inception of organocatalysis, numerous accounts of organocatalysed enantioselective nitro-Mannich reactions have been reported. These include examples using Brønsted base catalysts, Brønsted acid catalysts, bifunctional Brønsted base/H-bond donor catalysts and phase-transfer catalysts.

=== Bifunctional Brønsted Base/H-Bond Donor Organocatalysis ===
Small chiral molecule H-bond donors can be used as a powerful tool for enantioselective synthesis. These low molecular weight entities containing structural frameworks with distinct H-bond donor motifs can catalyse a wide range of carbon-carbon and carbon-heteroatom bond-forming reactions, occurring via H-bond donor activation of the reaction partners as well as through organisation of their spatial arrangement. This area of organic chemistry received limited attention until the seminal work of Jacobsen and Sigman in which they reported a highly enantioselective Strecker reaction using a H-bond donor organocatalyst:

Building on the work of Jacobsen, it was recognised that H-bond donor motifs can be linked via a chiral scaffold to Brønsted basic moieties, creating a new class of bifunctional organocatalysts (see concept figure below). The incorporation of these two functionalities allows the simultaneous activation of the nucleophile (via deprotonation by the Brønsted base) and electrophile (via H-bond donation), thus allowing the development of novel enantioselective reactions through new activation modes.

Based on this concept, Takemoto and co-workers reported the first bifunctional Brønsted base/H-bond donor thiourea organocatalyst 62 (see below) in 2003. This organocatalyst, based on the 1,2-trans-cyclohexanediamine scaffold, imparts high levels of enantiocontrol in the Michael addition of dimethylmalonate to a variety of nitrostyrenes. After this seminal report, numerous other bifunctional organocatalysts were developed derived from the readily available cinchona alkaloid scaffold. The quinidine-derived bifunctional organocatalyst 63 (first reported by Deng and co-workers) acts as a proficient catalyst for Michael addition reactions. In this organocatalytic system, the H-bonding interaction arising from the quinoline alcohol is thought to be crucial for achieving high enantioselectivities.

Also the bifunctional thioureas 64 and 65, again derived from the cinchona alkaloids, are very effective catalysts in Michael addition reactions. The bifunctional thiourea 66 is able to impart high levels of enantiocontrol in the nitro-aldol (Henry) reaction. Bifunctional thiourea 66 differs structurally from bifunctional thioureas 64 and 65, as the thiourea moiety is attached to the quinoline ring of the cinchona scaffold instead of the central stereocentre. Also numerous other bifunctional organocatalyst systems are described, which further expand the range of reactions that can be conducted using bifunctional (thio)urea organocatalysis.
