= Cellocidin =

- 2-Butynediamide Chemical Structure

Names
- Preferred IUPAC name But-2-ynediamide
- Other names Cellocidin; Lenamycin; Acetylene diamide; Acetylenedicarboxamide; Acetylenedicarboxylic acid diamide

Identifiers
CAS Number	543-21-5
3D model (JSmol)	Interactive image
ChEBI	CHEBI:51763
ChemSpider	10506
ECHA InfoCard	100.209.940
EC Number	684-490-7
MeSH	C015739
PubChem CID	10971
UNII	1K327HA41T
CompTox Dashboard (EPA)	DTXSID1060261
- InChI: InChI=1S/C4H4N2O2/c5-3(7)1-2-4(6)8/h(H2,5,7)(H2,6,8)
- SMILES: C(#CC(=O)N)C(=O)N

Properties
Chemical formula	C_{4}H_{4}N_{2}O_{2}
Molar mass	112.088 g·mol^{−1}
Density	1.411 g/mL
Melting point	179 °C (354 °F; 452 K)
log P	−1.2

Hazards
- Occupational safety and health (OHS/OSH)
Main hazards	Skin irritant; may cause respiratory tract irritation
- GHS labelling
Pictograms	(GHS07: Exclamation mark)
Signal word	Warning
Hazard statements	H302
Precautionary statements	P264, P270, P301+P312, P330, P501
Flash point	216 °C (421 °F; 489 K)
- Except where otherwise noted, data are given for materials in their standard state (at 25 °C [77 °F], 100 kPa). Infobox references

Cellocidin (2-butynediamide) is an organic chemical compound with the molecular formula C_{4}H_{4}O_{2}N_{2}. This compound was isolated from Streptomyces chibaensis, Streptomyces reticuli and Streptomyces sp. SF-536.

== Structure ==
Cellocidin is an organic compound containing 4 carbon atoms, 4 hydrogen atoms, 2 oxygen atoms, and 2 nitrogen atoms. It contains one carbon-carbon triple bond between carbons 2 and 3, and two carbon-oxygen double bonds off carbon 1 and carbon 4. Cellocidin contains two identical amide groups connected together by the central carbons (carbons 2 and 3).
