= Streptomyces corchorusii =

Scientific classification
- Domain: Bacteria
- Kingdom: Bacillati
- Phylum: Actinomycetota
- Class: Actinomycetes
- Order: Streptomycetales
- Family: Streptomycetaceae
- Genus: Streptomyces
- Species: S. corchorusii

Binomial name
- Streptomyces corchorusii Ahmad and Bhuiyan 1958 (Approved Lists 1980)

Type strain
- AS 4.1592, ATCC 25444, BCRC 11821, CBS 677.69, CCRC 11821, CGMCC 4.1592, DSM 40340, IFO 13032, ISP 5340, JCM 4286, JCM 4467, KCC S-0286, KCC S-0467, KCCS-0286, KCCS-0467, KCTC 9715, LMG 20488, NBRC 13032, NCIB 9476, NCIB 9979, NCIMB 9476, NCIMB 9979, NRRL B-12289, NRRL-ISP 5340, RIA 1224, VKM Ac-1906

Synonyms
- Streptomyces chibaensis Suzuki et al. 1958 (Approved Lists 1980)

Species of bacterium

Streptomyces corchorusii is a bacterium species from the genus of Streptomyces which has been isolated from soil. Streptomyces corchorusii produces butalactin.

== See also ==
- List of Streptomyces species
