= NOBIN =

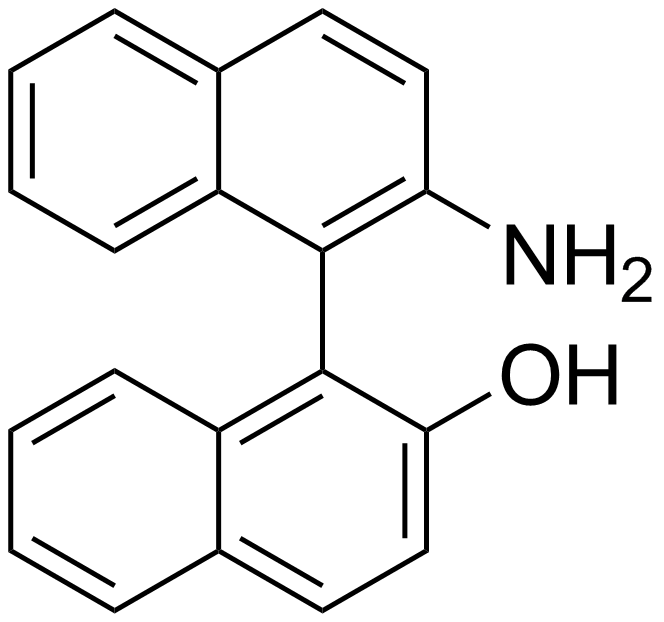

Names
- Preferred IUPAC name 2′-Amino[1,1′-binaphthalen]-2-ol
- Other names 2-Amino-2'-hydroxy-1,1'-binaphthyl

Identifiers
| CAS Number | 134532-03-9; 137848-28-3 (R); 137848-29-4 (S) |
| 3D model (JSmol) | Interactive image |
| ChemSpider | 2852904 |
| MeSH | C493913 |
| PubChem CID | 3617797 |
| UNII | 3Y5S695XXC |
| CompTox Dashboard (EPA) | DTXSID30929912 |
- InChI: InChI=1S/C20H15NO/c21-17-11-9-13-5-1-3-7-15(13)19(17)20-16-8-4-2-6-14(16)10-12-18(20)22/h1-12,22H,21H2 Key: HIXQCPGXQVQHJP-UHFFFAOYSA-N; InChI=1/C20H15NO/c21-17-11-9-13-5-1-3-7-15(13)19(17)20-16-8-4-2-6-14(16)10-12-18(20)22/h1-12,22H,21H2 Key: HIXQCPGXQVQHJP-UHFFFAOYAR
- SMILES: OC1=C(C2=C(C=CC=C3)C3=CC=C2N)C4=CC=CC=C4C=C1

Properties
| Chemical formula | C_{20}H_{15}NO |
| Molar mass | 285.346 g·mol^{−1} |
- Except where otherwise noted, data are given for materials in their standard state (at 25 °C [77 °F], 100 kPa). verify (what is ?) Infobox references

NOBIN (2-amino-2'-hydroxy-1,1'-binaphthyl) is an organic molecule used for asymmetric catalysis. NOBIN is related to BINOL and other analogs by both having a chiral axis and being a scaffold for certain chemical reactions. NOBIN is an excellent catalyst for the aldol reaction producing reliable products, good yields, and excellent diastereoselectivity.

Though rotation around the bond joining the rings is limited by the hydrogen atoms, enantiomerically pure NOBIN may racemize upon heating.

NOBIN is prepared by oxidative cross coupling of 2-naphthol and 2-naphthylamine. The oxidative source is metal ions in solution such as Fe^{2+} or a Cu^{2+} amine complex. Once racemic NOBIN is produced, it needs to be resolved. One method for this is the use of camphorsulfonic acid, in which the basic group of NOBIN is used to form a diastereomeric salt of one enantiomer. The other enantiomer however will stay in solution.

The two enantiomers of NOBIN, (S)-(-)-NOBIN (left) and (R)-(+)-NOBIN (right)
