= Squaramide =

Names
- IUPAC name 3,4-diaminocyclobut-3-ene-1,2-dione

Identifiers
CAS Number	5231-89-0
3D model (JSmol)	Interactive image
ChemSpider	2061512
EC Number	848-257-5
PubChem CID	2781329
UNII	3Q8TZB9ESJ
CompTox Dashboard (EPA)	DTXSID40381784
- InChI: InChI=1S/C4H4N2O2/c5-1-2(6)4(8)3(1)7/h5-6H2 Key: WUACDRFRFTWMHE-UHFFFAOYSA-N
- SMILES: C1(=C(C(=O)C1=O)N)N

Properties
Chemical formula	C_{4}H_{4}N_{2}O_{2}
Molar mass	112.088 g·mol^{−1}
Appearance	white solid
Melting point	338–340 °C (640–644 °F; 611–613 K)
- Except where otherwise noted, data are given for materials in their standard state (at 25 °C [77 °F], 100 kPa). Infobox references

Squaramide is the organic compound with the formula O_{2}C_{4}(NH_{2})_{2}. Not an amide in the usual sense, it is a derivative of squaric acid wherein the two OH groups are replaced by NH_{2} groups. Squaramides refer to a large class of derivatives wherein some of the H's are replaced by organic substituents. Exploiting their rigid planar structures, these compounds are of interest as hydrogen-bond donors in supramolecular chemistry and squaramide catalysis. Squaramides exhibit 10-50x greater affinity for halides than do thioureas. Squaramides also find application in medicinal chemistry, metabolomics and material science due to their ability to selectively conjugate amines

Squaramide is prepared by ammonolysis of diesters of squaric acid:

O_{2}C_{4}(OEt)_{2} + 2 NH_{3} → O_{2}C_{4}(NH_{2})_{2} + 2 EtOH

N-Substituted squaramides are prepared similarly, using amines in place of ammonia.

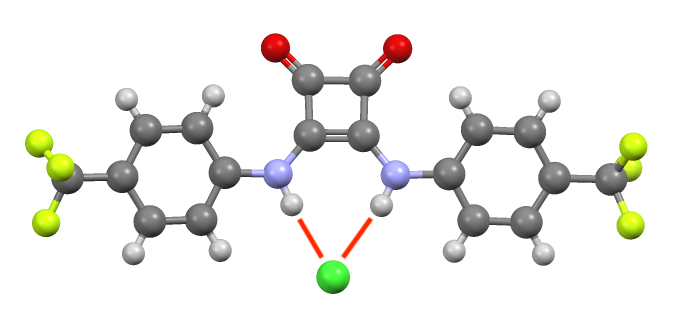
Chloride-squaramide interaction in O_{2}C_{4}(NH(C_{6}H_{4}CF_{3})_{2}. The characteristic planarity of a squaramide is evident.
