= TADDOL =

Chemical compound

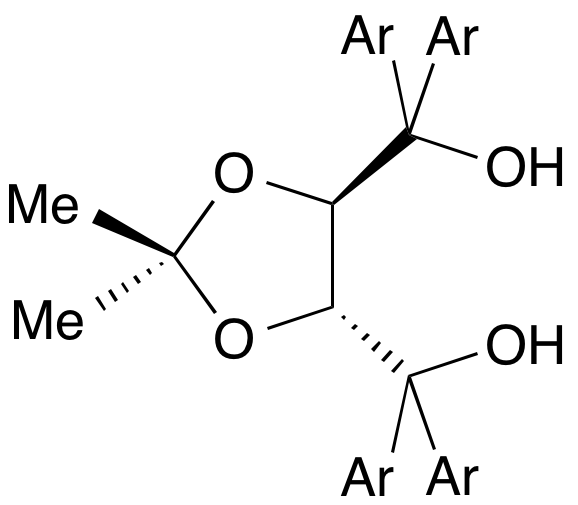
Structure of a generic TADDOL (Ar = aryl, Me = methyl.

In organic chemistry, TADDOL is an acronym for α,α,α',α'-tetraaryl-2,2-disubstituted 1,3-dioxolane-4,5-dimethanol. These compounds are easily accessed and are often used as chiral auxiliaries.

TADDOLs consist of a dioxolane ring substituted with two mutually transoid diarylhydroxymethyl Ar_{2}COH) groups. They are derived from d,l-tartaric acid, an inexpensive C_{2}-symmetric molecule. Condensation of dimethyl ester of d,l-tartaric acid with acetone gives the acetonide, a particular kind of dioxolane. The ester groups are susceptible to reaction with aryl Grignard reagents, leading after hydrolysis to the diol.
