= Β-Nitrostyrene =

β-Nitrostyrene

Names
- Preferred IUPAC name [(E)-2-Nitroethen-1-yl]benzene
- Other names (2-Nitrovinyl)benzene (2-Nitroethenyl)benzene ω-Nitrostyrene; 1-Nitro-2-phenylethene; 1-Nitro-2-phenylethylene

Identifiers
CAS Number	5153-67-3 (trans) 102-96-5; 5153-67-3 (trans)
3D model (JSmol)	Interactive image
ChemSpider	4447524
ECHA InfoCard	100.002.788
EC Number	203-066-0
PubChem CID	5284459
UNII	5287E3OUAV
CompTox Dashboard (EPA)	DTXSID0025789
- InChI: InChI=1S/C9H10O3/c1-11-8-3-4-9(12-2)7(5-8)6-10/h3-6H,1-2H3 Key: PIAOLBVUVDXHHL-VOTSOKGWSA-N; InChI=1S/C8H7NO2/c10-9(11)7-6-8-4-2-1-3-5-8/h1-7H/b7-6+ Key: AFUKNJHPZAVHGQ-UHFFFAOYAN
- SMILES: C1=CC=C(C=C1)/C=C/[N+](=O)[O-]

Properties
Chemical formula	C_{8}H_{7}NO_{2}
Molar mass	149.149 g·mol^{−1}
Appearance	Yellow crystalline solid
Melting point	58 °C (136 °F; 331 K)
Boiling point	255 °C (491 °F; 528 K)

Hazards
Safety data sheet (SDS)	MSDS at Sigma Aldrich
- Except where otherwise noted, data are given for materials in their standard state (at 25 °C [77 °F], 100 kPa). verify (what is ?) Infobox references

β-Nitrostyrene is an aromatic compound and a nitroalkene used in the synthesis of the slimicide β-bromo-β-nitrostyrene.

== Applications ==
β-Nitrostyrene is a chemical precursor for slimicides and dyes. Specifically bromo-nitrostyrene is obtained upon treatment with bromine followed by partial dehydrohalogenation.

Many of the syntheses of psychedelic substituted phenethylamines and substituted amphetamines described by Alexander Shulgin in his book PiHKAL use substituted nitrostyrenes as precursors. They are the final precursor, reduced with lithium aluminium hydride to the final product (an amine).

== Chemical synthesis ==
The chemical is produced by either the Henry reaction of benzaldehyde and nitromethane or by direct nitration of styrene using nitric oxide.

== Related compounds ==
- 3-Nitrostyrene (O_{2}NC_{6}H_{4}CH=CH_{2})
