= Phenyl-2-nitropropene =

1-Phenyl-2-nitropropene

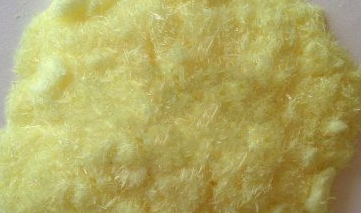

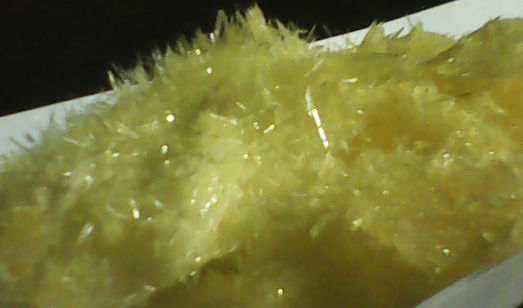

Names
- Preferred IUPAC name (2-Nitroprop-1-en-1-yl)benzene
- Other names P2NP; 1-Phenyl-2-nitropropene β-methyl-β-nitropropene trans-beta-Methyl-beta-Nitrostyrene (2-Nitro-1-propenyl)benzene

Identifiers
CAS Number	705-60-2; 18315-84-9 (E)
3D model (JSmol)	Interactive image
ChemSpider	1266396
ECHA InfoCard	100.155.731
PubChem CID	1549520
UNII	YT17M2UOTY
CompTox Dashboard (EPA)	DTXSID601336391 DTXSID1041188, DTXSID601336391
- InChI: InChI=1S/C9H9NO2/c1-8(10(11)12)7-9-5-3-2-4-6-9/h2-7H,1H3/b8-7+ Key: WGSVFWFSJDAYBM-BQYQJAHWSA-N; InChI=1/C9H9NO2/c1-8(10(11)12)7-9-5-3-2-4-6-9/h2-7H,1H3/b8-7+ Key: WGSVFWFSJDAYBM-BQYQJAHWBX
- SMILES: [O-][N+](=O)/C(=C/c1ccccc1)C

Properties
Chemical formula	C_{9}H_{9}NO_{2}
Molar mass	163.176 g·mol^{−1}
Appearance	Yellow solid
Melting point	64 to 66 °C (147 to 151 °F; 337 to 339 K)

Hazards
- GHS labelling
Pictograms	(GHS07: Exclamation mark)
Signal word	Warning
Hazard statements	H302, H315, H319, H335
Precautionary statements	P261, P264, P280, P301+P312, P302+P352, P304+P340, P305+P351+P338, P312, P330, P332+P313, P337+P313, P362+P364
- Except where otherwise noted, data are given for materials in their standard state (at 25 °C [77 °F], 100 kPa). verify (what is ?) Infobox references

1-Phenyl-2-nitropropene, or simply phenyl-2-nitropropene, or P2NP, as it is commonly referred to, is a chemical compound from the aromatic group of compounds, with the formula C_{9}H_{9}NO_{2}. It is a light-yellow crystalline solid with a distinct smell. Phenyl-2-nitropropene is used in the pharmaceutical industry to manufacture the drug Adderall, an amphetamine mixture used to treat ADHD and narcolepsy. P2NP and other similar nitrostyrenes are also employed in the clandestine manufacture of drugs of the amphetamine class, and are listed as drug precursors in many countries.

== Uses ==
In the pharmaceutical industry, P2NP is used to produce a racemic amphetamine mixture, branded under the trade names Adderall and Mydayis, amongst others. In this case, the double bond is hydrogenated and the nitro group is reduced, thus 1-phenyl-2-nitropropene becomes 1-phenyl-2-aminopropane, which is another name for amphetamine. Different reducing agents commonly include lithium aluminium hydride (LAH), sodium borohydride, aluminum amalgam or Raney nickel are used in suitable solvents like isopropyl alcohol or tetrahydrofuran.

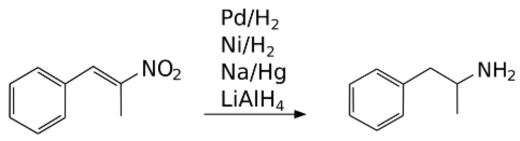
Reduction of P2NP to amphetamine

The above diagram depicts P2NP reduction to amphetamine by either LAH, sodium amalgam, Raney nickel, or palladium used as catalysts. Platinum, in the form of Adams' catalyst, can also be used.

P2NP can also be reduced to phenylacetone (P2P), the precursor in the synthesis of methamphetamine by a few methods. One in which phenyl-2-nitropropene is reduced to phenyl-2-nitropropane using sodium borohydride, followed by hydrolysis of the nitro group with hydrogen peroxide and potassium carbonate to produce phenylacetone (1-phenyl-2-propan-2-one). In another method, iron is the reducing agent and hydrochloric acid or acetic acid are used as catalysts forming an intermediate which hydrolyzes into phenylacetone as well.

== Synthesis ==
In the lab, phenyl-2-nitropropene is produced by the reaction of benzaldehyde and nitroethane in the presence of a basic catalyst like n-butylamine. The reaction is a nitroaldol reaction, and is a variant of a Knoevenagel condensation reaction, which is one of a broader class of reactions called Henry condensations, or simply Henry reactions. These are named after the German chemist Emil Knoevenagel, and the Belgian chemist Louis Henry, respectively.

Synthesis of phenyl-2-nitropropene

In this type of reaction, the basic catalyst deprotonates the nitroethane to form a resonance stabilized anion. This anion nucleophilically adds to the aldehyde forming a β-nitro alcohol, which is subsequently dehydrated to yield the nitroalkene. Water is produced as a byproduct, and must be actively removed from the reaction mixture. Often, primary amines such as n-butylamine, methylamine, and ethylamine are used as catalysts, as is anhydrous ammonium acetate at times.

Many other drugs of the amphetamine class are produced in a similar fashion, where substituted benzaldehyde derivatives are used to produce a different nitrostyrene, which is later reduced to the desired amine. One such reaction is the Knoevenagel condensation of piperonal with nitroethane, yielding 3,4-methylenedioxy-1-phenyl-2-nitropropene, or MDP2NP. This is reduced to 3,4-methylenedioxyamphetamine (MDA) which can be methylated to 3,4-methylenedioxymethamphetamine (MDMA). Another uses 2,5-dimethoxybenzaldehyde and nitromethane to yield 2,5-dimethoxy-β-nitrostyrene. Many of these Knoevenagel condensations were used by Alexander Shulgin to yield over 100 amphetamine derivatives, which he detailed in his book PiHKAL.

== Safety and storage ==
P2NP is labeled as harmful by the GHS, and is a known irritant. Thus, breathing fumes and direct skin and eye contact should be avoided. The median lethal dose for oral exposure in rats and mice is greater than 500 mg/kg and 1176 mg/kg, respectively. Based on available data, the classification criteria are not met to classify P2NP as a carcinogen. However, the toxicological properties have not been thoroughly investigated.

P2NP should be stored at 2 °C to 8 °C and away from strong oxidizing agents. At higher temperatures, P2NP is not very stable, and degrades with time.
