= Nitroethane =

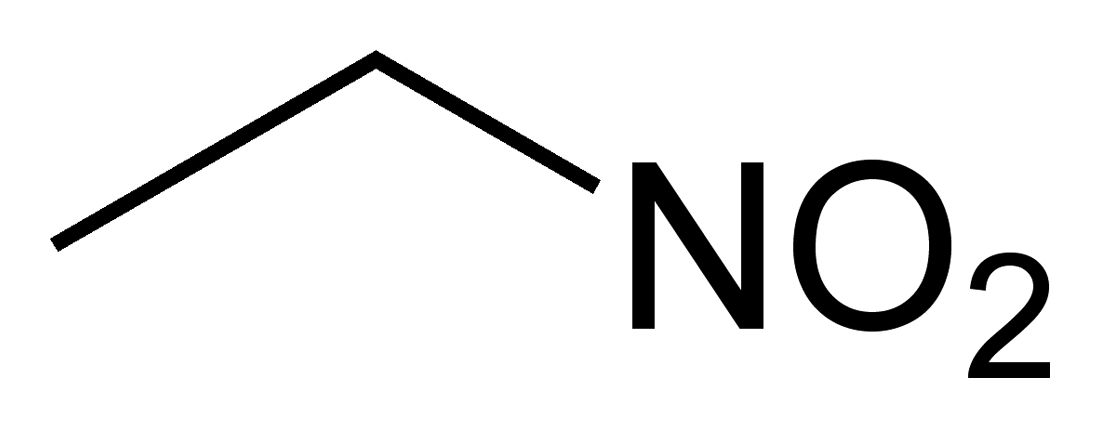

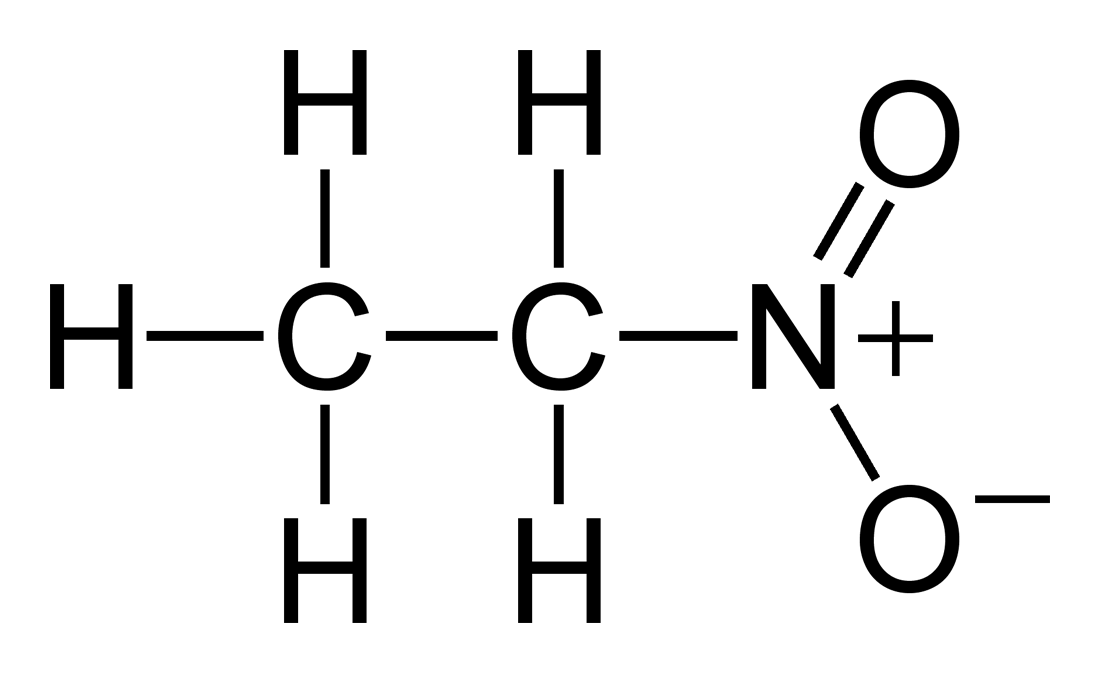

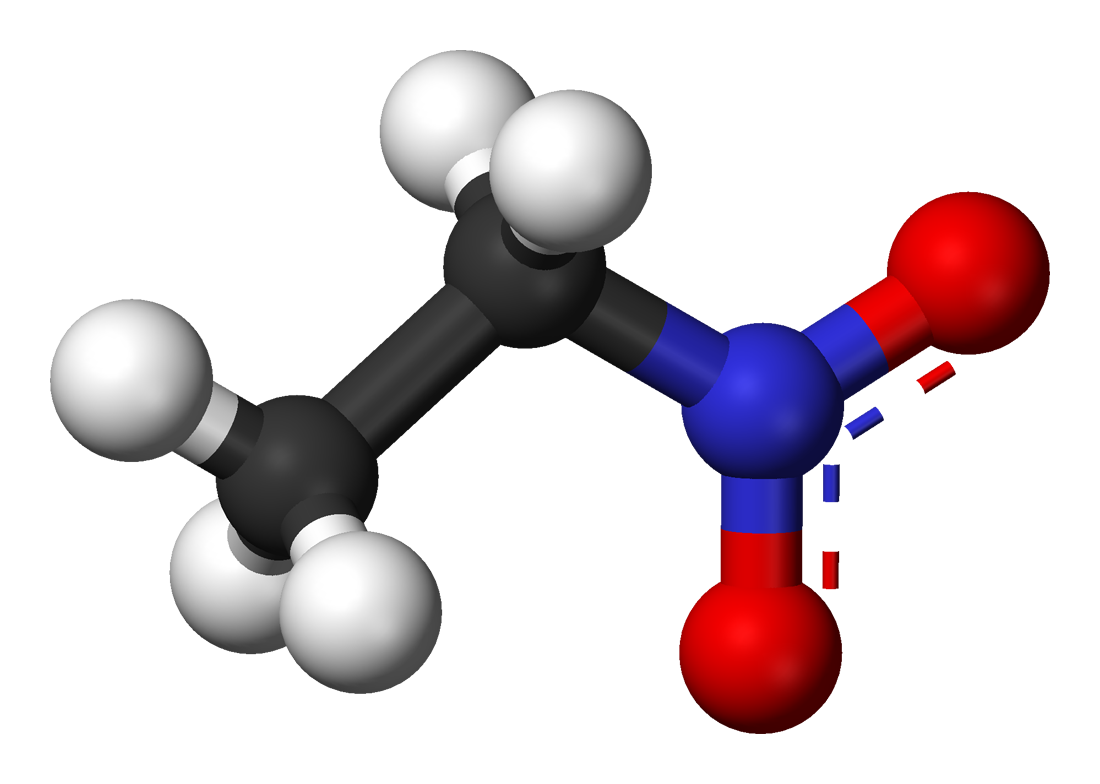
- Ball and stick model of nitroethane

Names
- Preferred IUPAC name Nitroethane

Identifiers
CAS Number	79-24-3
3D model (JSmol)	Interactive image
Abbreviations	EtNO_{2}
ChEBI	CHEBI:16268
ChEMBL	ChEMBL15625
ChemSpider	6338
ECHA InfoCard	100.001.081
KEGG	C01837
PubChem CID	6587
RTECS number	KI5600000
UNII	6KEL3ZAU0V
UN number	UN 2842
CompTox Dashboard (EPA)	DTXSID8020969
- InChI: InChI=1S/C2H5NO2/c1-2-3(4)5/h2H2,1H3 Key: MCSAJNNLRCFZED-UHFFFAOYSA-N; InChI=1/C2H5NO2/c1-2-3(4)5/h2H2,1H3 Key: MCSAJNNLRCFZED-UHFFFAOYAB
- SMILES: CC[N+](=O)[O-]

Properties
Chemical formula	C_{2}H_{5}NO_{2}
Molar mass	75.067 g·mol^{−1}
Appearance	Colorless liquid
Density	1.054 g/cm^{3}
Melting point	−89.42 °C (−128.96 °F; 183.73 K)
Boiling point	114 °C (237 °F; 387 K)
Solubility in water	Slightly soluble (4.6 g/100 ml at 20 °C)
Vapor pressure	21 mmHg (25 °C)
Acidity (pK_{a})	16.7
Magnetic susceptibility (χ)	−35.4·10^{−6} cm^{3}/mol
Viscosity	0.677 mPa·s at 20 °C

Hazards
- Occupational safety and health (OHS/OSH)
Main hazards	Flammable, harmful
- GHS labelling
Pictograms	(GHS02: Flammable) (GHS06: Toxic) (GHS08: Health hazard)
Signal word	Danger
Hazard statements	H226, H302, H315, H331, H341, H412
Precautionary statements	P210, P261, P301, P304, P312, P330, P340, P370, P378, P403+P233
NFPA 704 (fire diamond)	2 3 3
Flash point	28 °C (82 °F; 301 K)
Autoignition temperature	414 °C (777 °F; 687 K)
Explosive limits	3.4%-?
- Lethal dose or concentration (LD, LC)
LC_{50} (median concentration)	5000 ppm (rabbit, 2 hr)
LC_{Lo} (lowest published)	6250 ppm (mouse, 2 hr)
- NIOSH (US health exposure limits)
PEL (Permissible)	TWA 100 ppm (310 mg/m^{3})
REL (Recommended)	TWA 100 ppm (310 mg/m^{3})
IDLH (Immediate danger)	1000 ppm
Safety data sheet (SDS)	MSDS at fishersci.com

Related compounds
Related nitro compounds	Nitromethane; Nitropropane
Related compounds	Ethyl nitrite Ethyl nitrate
- Except where otherwise noted, data are given for materials in their standard state (at 25 °C [77 °F], 100 kPa). verify (what is ?) Infobox references

Nitroethane is an organic compound having the formula C_{2}H_{5}NO_{2} or CH_{3}CH_{2}NO_{2}. Similar in many regards to nitromethane, nitroethane is an oily liquid at standard temperature and pressure. Pure nitroethane is colorless and has a fruity odor.

== Preparation ==
Nitroethane is produced industrially by treating propane with nitric acid at 350–450 °C. This exothermic reaction produces four industrially significant nitroalkanes: nitromethane, nitroethane, 1-nitropropane, and 2-nitropropane. The reaction involves free radicals, such as CH_{3}CH_{2}CH_{2}O^{.}, which arise via homolysis of the corresponding nitrite ester. These alkoxy radicals are susceptible to C—C fragmentation reactions, which explains the formation of a mixture of products.

Alternatively, nitroethane can be produced by the Victor Meyer reaction of haloethanes such as chloroethane, bromoethane, or iodoethane with silver nitrite in diethyl ether or THF. The Kornblum modification of this reaction uses sodium nitrite in either a dimethyl sulfoxide or dimethylformamide solvent.

== Uses ==
Via condensations like the Henry reaction, nitroethane converts to several compounds of commercial interest. Condensation with 3,4-dimethoxybenzaldehyde affords the precursor to the antihypertensive drug methyldopa; condensation with unsubstituted benzaldehyde yields phenyl-2-nitropropene, a precursor for amphetamine drugs. Nitroethane condenses with two equivalents of formaldehyde to give, after hydrogenation, 2-amino-2-methyl-1,3-propanediol, which in turn condenses with oleic acid to give an oxazoline, which protonates to give a cationic surfactant.

Like some other nitrated organic compounds, nitroethane is also used as a fuel additive and a precursor to rocket propellants.

Nitroethane is a useful solvent for polymers such as polystyrene and is particularly useful for dissolving cyanoacrylate adhesives. In cosmetics applications, it has been used as a component in artificial nail remover and in overhead ceiling sealant sprays.

Nitroethane was previously used successfully as a chemical feedstock (precursor ingredient) in laboratories for the synthesis of multitudes of substances and consumer goods. For example, the medicine Pervitin (methamphetamine) was commonly used in the 19th and 20th century, and was especially popular during WWII by troops of both sides for mood elevation, appetite and sleep suppression and increasing focus and alertness). Nitroalkanes were one of many ingredients used in the synthesis of many phenethylamines, including medications such as Pervitin and the racemic compound Benzedrine (amphetamine), used as an anorectic medicine for obesity.

== Toxicity ==
Nitroethane is suspected to cause genetic damage and be harmful to the nervous system. Typical TLV/TWA is 100 ppm. Typical STEL is 150 ppm. Skin contact causes dermatitis in humans. In animal studies, nitroethane exposure was observed to cause lacrimation, dyspnea, pulmonary rales, edema, liver and kidney injury, and narcosis. Children have been poisoned by accidental ingestion of artificial nail remover.

The LD_{50} for rats is reported as 1100 mg/kg.
