= C3H7NO2 =

The molecular formula C_{3}H_{7}NO_{2} may refer to:

- Alanine
- β-Alanine
- Ethyl carbamate
- Isopropyl nitrite
- Propyl nitrite
- Lactamide
- Nitropropanes
  - 1-Nitropropane
  - 2-Nitropropane
- Sarcosine
