= Oxynitrilase =

Oxynitrilase may refer to:

- (S)-hydroxynitrile lyase, an enzyme
- Hydroxymandelonitrile lyase, an enzyme
