= Nitrolic acid =

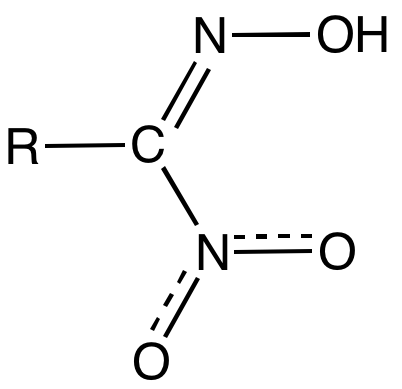
Structure of a nitrolic acid.

Nitrolic acids are organic compounds with the functional group RC(NO_{2})=NOH. They are prepared by the reaction of nitroalkanes with base and nitrite sources:

RCH_{2}NO_{2} + HNO_{2} → RC(NO_{2})=NOH + H_{2}O

The conversion was first demonstrated by Victor Meyer using nitroethane. The reaction proceeds via the intermediacy of the nitronate anion.

== Occurrence ==
Most nitrolic acids are laboratory curiosities. One exception is the compound HO_{2}C(CH_{2})_{4}C(NO_{2})=NOH, which is produced by the oxidation of cyclohexanone with nitric acid. This species decomposes to adipic acid and nitrous oxide:

HO_{2}C(CH_{2})_{4}C(NO_{2})=NOH → HO_{2}C(CH_{2})_{4}CO_{2}H + N_{2}O

This conversion is thought to be the largest anthropogenic route to N_{2}O, which, on a molecule-to-molecule basis, has 298 times the atmospheric heat-trapping ability of carbon dioxide. Adipic acid is a precursor to many nylon polymers. In the end, nitrous oxide is produced in about one to one mole ratio to the adipic acid.
