= Hydroxynitrile lyase =

Hydroxynitrile lyase may refer to:

- Hydroxynitrilase, an enzyme
- (S)-hydroxynitrile lyase, an enzyme
