= Nitromethane =

Structural formula of nitromethane
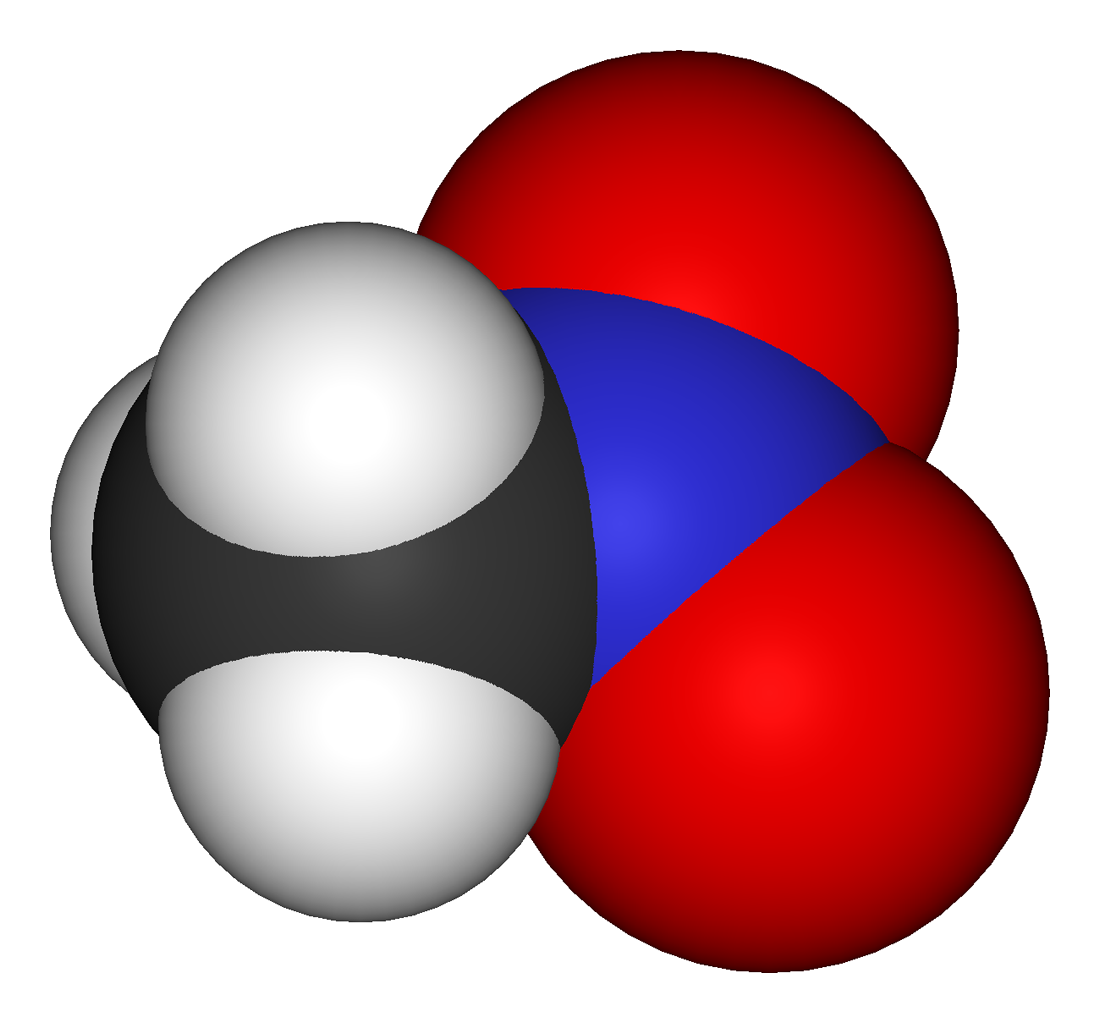
Nitromethane

Names
- Preferred IUPAC name Nitromethane
- Other names Nitrocarbol

Identifiers
CAS Number	75-52-5
3D model (JSmol)	Interactive image
Abbreviations	MeNO_{2}
ChEBI	CHEBI:77701
ChEMBL	ChEMBL276924
ChemSpider	6135
ECHA InfoCard	100.000.797
KEGG	C19275
PubChem CID	6375
RTECS number	PA9800000
UNII	RU5WG8C3F4
CompTox Dashboard (EPA)	DTXSID2020977
- InChI: InChI=1S/CH3NO2/c1-2(3)4/h1H3 Key: LYGJENNIWJXYER-UHFFFAOYSA-N; InChI=1/CH3NO2/c1-2(3)4/h1H3 Key: LYGJENNIWJXYER-UHFFFAOYAW
- SMILES: C[N+](=O)[O-]

Properties
Chemical formula	CH_{3}NO_{2}
Molar mass	61.040 g·mol^{−1}
Appearance	colorless, oily liquid
Odor	Light, fruity
Density	1.1371 g/cm^{3} (20 °C)
Melting point	−28.7 °C (−19.7 °F; 244.5 K)
Boiling point	101.2 °C (214.2 °F; 374.3 K)
Critical point (T, P)	588 K, 6.0 MPa
Solubility in water	ca. 10 g/100 mL
Solubility	miscible in diethyl ether, acetone, ethanol, methanol
Vapor pressure	28 mmHg (20 °C)
Acidity (pK_{a})	10.21 (H_{2}O); 17.2 (DMSO)
Magnetic susceptibility (χ)	−21.0·10^{−6} cm^{3}/mol
Thermal conductivity	0.204 W/(m·K) at 25 °C
Refractive index (n_{D})	1.3817 (20 °C)
Viscosity	0.63 cP at 25 °C
Dipole moment	3.46

Explosive data
Shock sensitivity	Low
Friction sensitivity	Low
Detonation velocity	6400 m/s

Thermochemistry
Heat capacity (C)	106.6 J/(mol·K)
Std molar entropy (S^{⦵}_{298})	171.8 J/(mol·K)
Std enthalpy of formation (Δ_{f}H^{⦵}_{298})	−112.6 kJ/mol
Gibbs free energy (Δ_{f}G^{⦵})	−14.4 kJ/mol
Std enthalpy of combustion (Δ_{c}H^{⦵}_{298})	-709 kJ/mol
Enthalpy of fusion (Δ_{f}H^{⦵}_{fus})	9.7 kJ/mol
Enthalpy of vaporization (Δ_{f}H_{vap})	38.3 kJ/mol

Hazards
- Occupational safety and health (OHS/OSH)
Main hazards	Flammable, health hazard
- GHS labelling
Pictograms	(GHS01: Explosive) (GHS02: Flammable) (GHS06: Toxic) (GHS08: Health hazard)
Signal word	Danger
Hazard statements	H203, H226, H301, H331, H351
Precautionary statements	P210, P261, P280, P304+P340, P312, P370+P378, P403+P233
NFPA 704 (fire diamond)	2 3 3
Flash point	35 °C (95 °F; 308 K)
Autoignition temperature	418 °C (784 °F; 691 K)
Explosive limits	7–22%
Threshold limit value (TLV)	20 ppm
- Lethal dose or concentration (LD, LC)
LD_{50} (median dose)	940 mg/kg (oral, rat); 950 mg/kg (oral, mouse)
LD_{Lo} (lowest published)	750 mg/kg (rabbit, oral); 125 mg/kg (dog, oral)
LC_{Lo} (lowest published)	7087 ppm (mouse, 2 h); 1000 ppm (monkey); 2500 ppm (rabbit, 12 h); 5000 ppm (rabbit, 6 h)
- NIOSH (US health exposure limits)
PEL (Permissible)	TWA 100 ppm (250 mg/m^{3})
REL (Recommended)	none
IDLH (Immediate danger)	750 ppm

Related compounds
Related nitro compounds	Nitroethane
Related compounds	methyl nitrite methyl nitrate

Supplementary data page
- Nitromethane (data page)
- Except where otherwise noted, data are given for materials in their standard state (at 25 °C [77 °F], 100 kPa). verify (what is ?) Infobox references

Nitromethane, sometimes shortened to simply "nitro", is an organic compound with the chemical formula CH_{3}NO_{2}. It is the simplest organic nitro compound. It is a polar liquid commonly used as a solvent in a variety of industrial applications such as in extractions, as a reaction medium, and as a cleaning solvent. As an intermediate in organic synthesis, it is used widely in the manufacture of pesticides, explosives, fibers, and coatings. Nitromethane is used as a fuel additive in various motorsports and hobbies, e.g. Top Fuel drag racing and miniature internal combustion engines in radio control, control line and free flight model aircraft.

== Preparation ==
Nitromethane is produced industrially by combining propane and nitric acid in the gas phase at 350–450 °C (662–842 °F). This exothermic reaction produces the four industrially significant nitroalkanes: nitromethane, nitroethane, 1-nitropropane, and 2-nitropropane. The reaction involves free radicals, including the alkoxyl radicals of the type CH_{3}CH_{2}CH_{2}O, which arise via homolysis of the corresponding nitrite ester. These alkoxy radicals are susceptible to C—C fragmentation reactions, which explains the formation of a mixture of products.

=== Laboratory methods ===
It can also be prepared by other methods that are of instructional value. The reaction of sodium chloroacetate with sodium nitrite in aqueous solution produces this compound, along with sodium chloride and sodium bicarbonate:

ClCH_{2}COONa + NaNO_{2} + H_{2}O → CH_{3}NO_{2} + NaCl + NaHCO_{3}

== Uses ==
The dominant use of the nitromethane is as a precursor reagent. A major derivative is chloropicrin (CCl_{3}NO_{2}), a widely used pesticide. It condenses with formaldehyde (Henry reaction) to eventually give tris(hydroxymethyl)aminomethane ("tris"), a widely used buffer and ingredient in alkyd resins.

=== Solvent and stabilizer ===
The major application is as a stabilizer in chlorinated solvents. As an organic solvent, nitromethane has an unusual combination of properties: highly polar (ε_{r} = 36 at 20 °C and μ = 3.5 debye) but aprotic and weakly basic. This combination makes it useful for dissolving positively charged, strongly electrophilic species. It is a solvent for acrylate monomers, such as cyanoacrylates (more commonly known as "super-glues").

=== Fuel ===
Although a minor application in terms of volume, nitromethane also is used as a fuel or fuel additive for sports and hobby. For some applications, it is mixed with methanol in racing cars, boats, and model engines.

Nitromethane is used as a fuel in motor racing, particularly drag racing, as well as for radio-controlled model power boats, cars, planes and helicopters. In this context, nitromethane is commonly referred to as "nitro fuel" or simply "nitro", and is the principal ingredient for fuel used in the "Top Fuel" category of drag racing.

The oxygen content of nitromethane enables it to burn with much less atmospheric oxygen than conventional fuels. During nitromethane combustion, nitric oxide (NO) is one of the major emission products along with CO_{2} and H_{2}O. Nitric oxide contributes to air pollution, acid rain, and ozone layer depletion. Recent (2020) studies suggest the correct stoichiometric equation for the burning of nitromethane is:

4 CH_{3}NO_{2} + 5 O_{2} → 4 CO_{2} + 6 H_{2}O + 4 NO

The amount of air required to burn 1 kg (2.2 lb) of gasoline is 14.7 kg (32 lb), but only 1.7 kg (3.7 lb) of air is required for 1 kg of nitromethane. Since an engine's cylinder can only contain a limited amount of air on each stroke, 8.6 times as much nitromethane as gasoline can be burned in one stroke. Nitromethane, however, has a lower specific energy: gasoline provides about 42–44 MJ/kg, whereas nitromethane provides only 11.3 MJ/kg. This analysis indicates that nitromethane generates about 2.3 times the power of gasoline when combined with a given amount of oxygen.

Nitromethane can also be used as a monopropellant, i.e., a propellant that decomposes to release energy without added oxygen. It was first tested as rocket monopropellant in 1930s by Luigi Crocco from the Italian Rocket Society. There is a renewed interest in nitromethane as safer replacement of hydrazine monopropellant. The following equation describes this process:

2 CH_{3}NO_{2} → 2 CO + 2 H_{2}O + H_{2} + N_{2}

Nitromethane has a laminar combustion velocity of approximately 0.5 m/s, somewhat higher than gasoline, thus making it suitable for high-speed engines. It also has a somewhat higher flame temperature of about 2,400 °C (4,350 °F). The high heat of vaporization of 0.56 MJ/kg together with the high fuel flow provides significant cooling of the incoming charge (about twice that of methanol), resulting in reasonably low temperatures.

Nitromethane is usually used with rich air–fuel mixtures because it provides power even in the absence of atmospheric oxygen. When rich air–fuel mixtures are used, hydrogen and carbon monoxide are two of the combustion products. These gases often ignite, sometimes spectacularly, as the normally very rich mixtures of the still burning fuel exits the exhaust ports. Very rich mixtures are necessary to reduce the temperature of combustion chamber hot parts in order to control pre-ignition and subsequent detonation. Operational details depend on the particular mixture and engine characteristics.

A small amount of hydrazine blended in nitromethane can increase the power output even further. With nitromethane, hydrazine forms an explosive salt that is again a monopropellant. This unstable mixture poses a severe safety hazard. The National Hot Rod Association and Academy of Model Aeronautics do not permit its use in competitions.

In model aircraft and car glow fuel, the primary ingredient is generally methanol with some nitromethane (0% to 65%, but rarely over 30%, and 10–20% lubricants (usually castor oil and/or synthetic oil)). Even moderate amounts of nitromethane tend to increase the power created by the engine (as the limiting factor is often the air intake), making the engine easier to tune (adjust for the proper air/fuel ratio).

=== Former uses ===
It formerly was used in the explosives industry as a component in a binary explosive formulation with ammonium nitrate and in shaped charges, and it was used as a chemical stabilizer to prevent decomposition of various halogenated hydrocarbons.

=== Other ===
It can be used as an explosive, when gelled with several percent of gelling agent. This type of mixture is called PLX. Other mixtures include ANNM and ANNMAl – explosive mixtures of ammonium nitrate, nitromethane and aluminium powder.

== Reactions ==
=== Acid-base properties ===
Nitromethane is a relatively acidic carbon acid. It has a pK_{a} of 17.2 in DMSO solution. This value indicates an aqueous pK_{a} of about 11. The acidity of nitromethane arises from the stability conferred by its resonance structure which delocalizes the charge across the molecule:

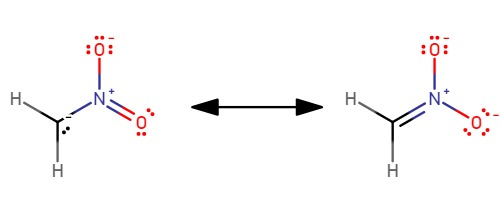

The acid deprotonates only slowly. Protonation of the conjugate base O_{2}NCH^{−}_{2}, which is nearly isosteric with nitrate, occurs initially at oxygen.

=== Organic reactions ===
In organic synthesis nitromethane is employed as a one carbon building block. Its acidity allows it to undergo deprotonation, enabling condensation reactions analogous to those of carbonyl compounds, and acting as a Michael donor. Thus, under base catalysis, nitromethane adds to aldehydes in 1,2-addition in the nitroaldol reaction and condenses with itself to make methazonic acid.

Some important derivatives include the pesticide chloropicrin Cl_{3}CNO_{2}, the slimicide β-bromo-β-nitrostyrene (via β-nitrostyrene), and the biocide tris(hydroxymethyl)nitromethane (HOCH_{2})_{3}CNO_{2}. Reduction of the latter gives tris(hydroxymethyl)aminomethane, (HOCH_{2})_{3}CNH_{2}, better known as tris, a widely used buffer.

== Purification ==
Nitromethane is a popular solvent in organic and electroanalytical chemistry. It can be purified by cooling below its freezing point, washing the solid with cold diethyl ether, followed by distillation.

== Safety ==
Nitromethane has a modest acute toxicity. LD50 (oral, rats) is 1210±322 mg/kg.

Nitromethane is "reasonably anticipated to be a human carcinogen" according to a U.S. government report. In the United States, nitromethane is regulated under the Department of Homeland Security, specifically under the Chemical Facilities Anti-Terrorism Standards (CFATS). Their program ensures that high-risk facilities take appropriate security measures to reduce overall risk associated with certain chemicals. The Department of Homeland Security considers chemicals such as nitromethane to be "chemicals of interest" (COI) due to their hazardous nature. Due to this, CFATS requires specific protocols to be taken for marking, labeling, and transporting this material. Additionally, within any facility that possesses over 42 gallons or more of nitromethane must report and implement CFATS security measures accordingly.

=== Explosive properties ===
Nitromethane was not known to be a high explosive until a railroad tank car loaded with it exploded on June 1, 1958. After much testing, it was realized that nitromethane was a more energetic high explosive than TNT, although TNT has a higher velocity of detonation (VoD) and brisance. Both of these explosives are oxygen-poor, and some benefits are gained from mixing with an oxidizer, such as ammonium nitrate. Large amounts of these explosives were used in Operation Plowshare that mainly focused on nuclear explosions.

Pure nitromethane is an insensitive explosive with a VoD of approximately 6,400 m/s (21,000 ft/s), but even so inhibitors may be used to reduce the hazards. The tank car explosion was speculated to be due to adiabatic compression, a hazard common to all liquid explosives. This is when small entrained air bubbles compress and superheat with rapid rises in pressure. It was thought that an operator rapidly snapped shut a valve creating a "hammer-lock" pressure surge.

Nitromethane is used as a model explosive, along with TNT. It has several advantages as a model explosive over TNT, namely its uniform density and lack of solid post-detonation species that complicate the determination of equation of state and further calculations.

Nitromethane reacts with solutions of sodium hydroxide or methoxide in alcohol to produce an insoluble salt of nitromethane. This substance is a sensitive explosive which reverts to nitromethane under acidic conditions and decomposes in water to form another explosive compound, sodium methazonate, which has a reddish-brown color:

2 CH_{3}NO_{2} + NaOH → HON=CHCH=NO_{2}Na + 2 H_{2}O

Nitromethane's reaction with solid sodium hydroxide is hypergolic.

=== Regulation ===
Under the Comprehensive Environmental Response, Compensation, and Liability Act (CERCLA), nitromethane is a hazardous chemical substance that has a federal reportable quantity of 1000 pounds. Any release of this chemical at or above this amount has to be reported within a 24-hour period.

=== Human exposure ===
Data from the United States National Health and Nutrition Examination Survey(NHANES) about the chemical states that nitromethane has been detected in a lot of blood sample tests from smokers. Analyzing this data found that smoking half a pack of cigarettes per day could cause a 150 ng/L increase in nitromethane inside of your blood stream compared to non smokers.

== See also ==
- Top Fuel
- Adiabatic flame temperature, a thermodynamic calculation of the flame temperature of nitromethane
- Dinitromethane
- Model engine
- Trinitromethane
- Tetranitromethane
- RE factor

== Cited sources ==
- Haynes, William M., ed. (2011). CRC Handbook of Chemistry and Physics (92nd ed.). CRC Press. ISBN 978-1-4398-5511-9.
