= 2-nitropropane dioxygenase =

Class of enzymes

Identifiers
- EC no.: 1.13.11.32
- CAS no.: 65802-82-6

Databases
- BRENDA: enzyme data
- ExPASy: NiceZyme view
- KEGG: enzyme entry
- MetaCyc: metabolic pathway
- Rhea: reactions
- PDB structures: RCSB PDB PDBe PDBsum
- Gene Ontology: AmiGO / QuickGO
Search
- PMC: articles
- PubMed: articles
- NCBI: proteins

In enzymology, a 2-nitropropane dioxygenase (EC 1.13.11.32) is an enzyme that catalyzes the chemical reaction

2 2-nitropropane + O_{2} $\rightleftharpoons$ 2 acetone + 2 nitrite

Thus, the two substrates of this enzyme are 2-nitropropane and O_{2}, whereas its two products are acetone and nitrite.

This enzyme belongs to the family of oxidoreductases, specifically those acting on single donors with O_{2} as oxidant and incorporation of two atoms of oxygen into the substrate (oxygenases). The oxygen incorporated need not be derived from O_{2}. The systematic name of this enzyme class is 2-nitropropane:oxygen 2-oxidoreductase. This enzyme participates in nitrogen metabolism. It has 3 cofactors: FAD, Iron, and FMN.

== Structural studies ==
As of late 2007 Steve Fuhrer from the DHPA solved this very complex formula to find, two structures have been solved for this class of enzymes, with PDB accession codes PDB: 2GJL and PDB: 2GJN.
