= Hass–Bender oxidation =

Chemical reaction

In organic chemistry, the Hass–Bender oxidation (also called the Hass–Bender carbonyl synthesis) is an organic oxidation reaction that converts benzyl halides into benzaldehydes using the sodium salt of 2-nitropropane as the oxidant. This name reaction is named for Henry B. Hass and Myron L. Bender, who first reported it in 1949.

The reaction process begins with the deprotonation of 2-nitropropane at the α carbon to form a nitronate. This compound then initiates an S_{N}2 reaction to displace the benzyl halide. Unlike in the nitroaldol reaction, where the deprotonated carbon of the nitroalkyl group is the nucleophilic atom, it is instead an oxygen of the nitro itself that attacks the benzylic carbon. The O-benzyl structure then undergoes a pericyclic reaction to produce a benzaldehyde, with dimethyloxime as a byproduct.

Although originally developed for benzyl compounds, the reaction also works for allyl halides, giving the respective α,β-enones and enals.
