= Aminopropionic acid =

Aminopropionic acid (C_{3}H_{7}NO_{2}, molar mass 89.093 g/mol) may refer to:

- 2-Aminopropionic acid, or alanine
- 3-Aminopropionic acid, or β-alanine
