= HNL =

HNL may refer to:

- Croatian Football League (Hrvatska nogometna liga), the top level of the Croatian football league system
- Daniel K. Inouye International Airport, IATA airport code HNL, in Honolulu, Hawaii, United States
- Hindustan Newsprint Limited, a newsprint manufacturing company in Kerala
- Honduran lempira, ISO 4217 code HNL, the currency of Honduras
- Hum Network Limited, a media company in Karachi, Pakistan
- hydroxynitrile lyase, an enzyme
