= Silver nitrite =

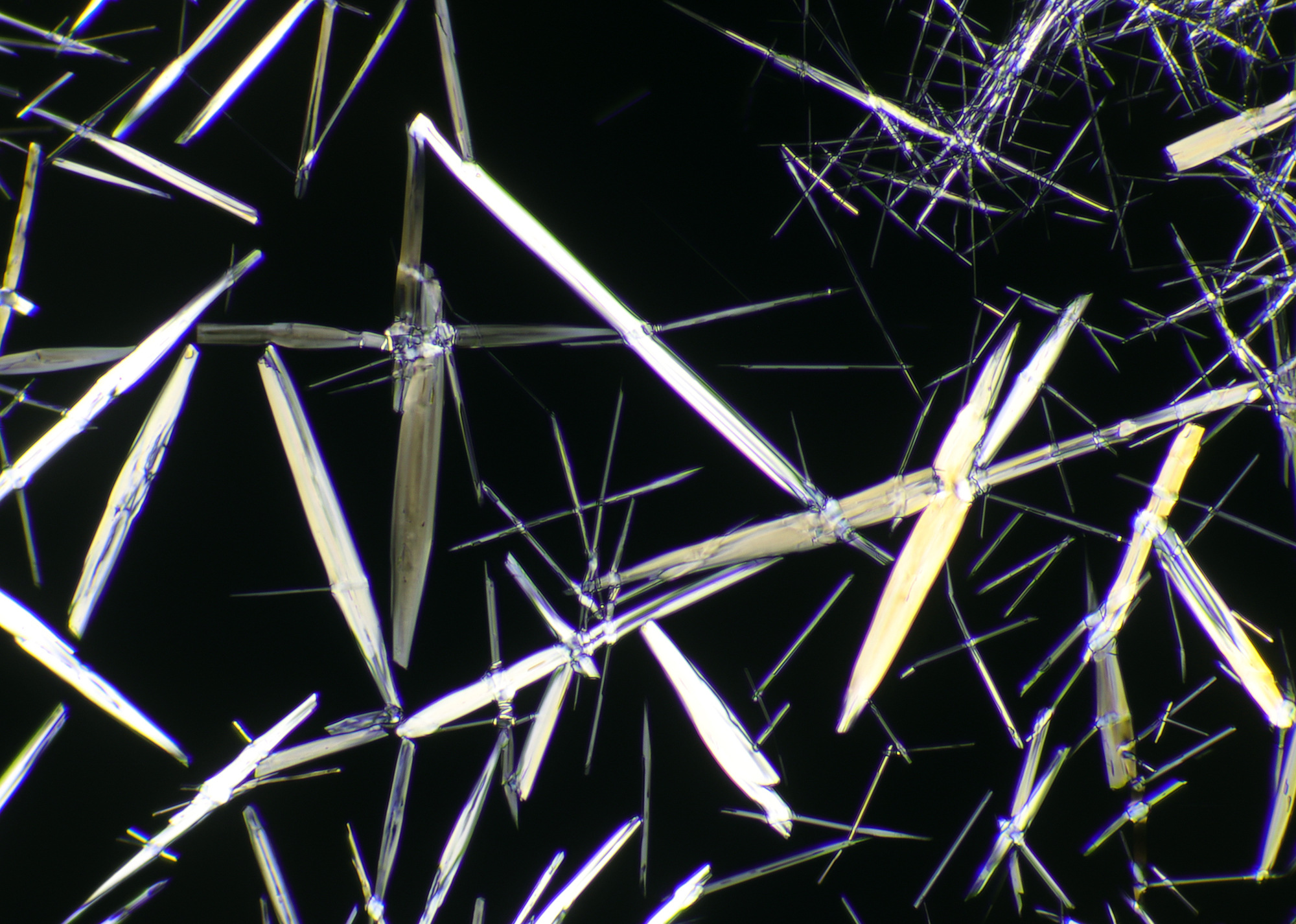
- Silver nitrite

Names
- IUPAC name Silver(I) nitrite
- Other names Argentous nitrite

Identifiers
CAS Number	7783-99-5
3D model (JSmol)	Interactive image
ChemSpider	141361
ECHA InfoCard	100.029.128
EC Number	232-041-7
PubChem CID	160904
UNII	T3MZ57OGIF
CompTox Dashboard (EPA)	DTXSID00884428
- InChI: InChI=1S/Ag.HNO2/c;2-1-3/h;(H,2,3)/q+1;/p-1 Key: KKKDGYXNGYJJRX-UHFFFAOYSA-M
- SMILES: N(=O)[O-].[Ag+]

Properties
Chemical formula	AgNO_{2}
Molar mass	153.87 g/mol
Appearance	colorless to yellow crystals
Melting point	140 °C (284 °F; 413 K)
Solubility in water	0.155 g/100 mL (0 °C); 0.275 g/100 mL (15 °C); 1.363 g/100 mL (60 °C)
Solubility	insoluble in ethanol
Magnetic susceptibility (χ)	−42.0·10^{−6} cm^{3}/mol

Hazards
- GHS labelling
Pictograms	(GHS03: Oxidizing) (GHS07: Exclamation mark) (GHS09: Environmental hazard)
Signal word	Warning
Hazard statements	H272, H302, H315, H319, H400
Precautionary statements	P210, P220, P221, P264, P270, P273, P280, P301+P312, P302+P352, P305+P351+P338, P321, P330, P332+P313, P337+P313, P362, P370+P378, P391, P501
NFPA 704 (fire diamond)	2 0 2
Safety data sheet (SDS)	Sigma-Aldrich
- Except where otherwise noted, data are given for materials in their standard state (at 25 °C [77 °F], 100 kPa). Infobox references

Silver nitrite is an inorganic compound with the formula AgNO_{2}.

== Production ==
Silver nitrite is produced from the reaction between silver nitrate and an alkali nitrite, such as sodium nitrite. Silver nitrite is much less soluble in water than silver nitrate, and a solution of silver nitrate will readily precipitate silver nitrite upon addition of sodium nitrite:

AgNO_{3} + NaNO_{2} → NaNO_{3} + AgNO_{2}

Alternatively, it can be produced by the reaction between silver sulfate and barium nitrite.

== Applications ==
Silver nitrite has many applications. Notable examples include:

- The production of aniline compounds.
- General oxidizing agent.
- Victor Meyer type nucleophilic substitution reactions with organobromides or organoiodides forming nitro compounds.
- Nitroalkene synthesis with nitryl iodide generated in-situ from silver nitrite and elemental iodine.
- 1,2,3-Benzothiadiazoles synthesis via skeletal editing (S,N-heteroarene ring transformation) of variously functionalized 2-halobenzothiazoles and benzothiazolinones
