= Nitroalkane oxidase =

Enzyme

nitroethane oxidase

Identifiers
- EC no.: 1.7.3.1
- CAS no.: 9029-36-1

Databases
- IntEnz: IntEnz view
- BRENDA: BRENDA entry
- ExPASy: NiceZyme view
- KEGG: KEGG entry
- MetaCyc: metabolic pathway
- PRIAM: profile
- PDB structures: RCSB PDB PDBe PDBsum
- Gene Ontology: AmiGO / QuickGO
Search
- PMC: articles
- PubMed: articles
- NCBI: proteins

In enzymology, a nitroalkane oxidase (EC 1.7.3.1) is an enzyme that catalyzes the chemical reaction

a nitroalkane + H_{2}O + O_{2} $\rightleftharpoons$ an aldehyde or ketone + nitrite + H_{2}O_{2}

The 3 substrates of this enzyme are nitroalkane, H_{2}O, and O_{2}, whereas its 4 products are aldehyde, ketone, nitrite, and H_{2}O_{2}.

This enzyme belongs to the family of oxidoreductases, specifically those acting on other nitrogenous compounds as donors with oxygen as acceptor. The systematic name of this enzyme class is nitroalkane:oxygen oxidoreductase. Other names in common use include nitroethane oxidase, NAO, and nitroethane:oxygen oxidoreductase. This enzyme participates in nitrogen metabolism.
