= Nitropropane =

Nitropropane may refer to:

- 1-Nitropropane
- 2-Nitropropane
