= Vapour density =

Density of a vapor in relation to that of hydrogen

Vapour density is the density of a vapour in relation to that of hydrogen. It may be defined as mass of a certain volume of a substance divided by mass of same volume of hydrogen.

vapour density = mass of n molecules of gas / mass of n molecules of hydrogen gas .
vapour density = molar mass of gas / molar mass of H_{2}
vapour density = molar mass of gas / 2.01568
vapour density = 1/2 × molar mass

(and thus: molar mass = ~2 × vapour density) For example, vapour density of mixture of NO_{2} and N_{2}O_{4} is 38.3. Vapour density is a dimensionless quantity.

Vapour density = density of gas / density of hydrogen (H2)

== Alternative definition ==
In many web sources, particularly in relation to safety considerations at commercial and industrial facilities in the U.S., vapour density is defined with respect to air, not hydrogen. Air is given a vapour density of one. For this use, air has a molecular weight of 28.97 atomic mass units, and all other gas and vapour molecular weights are divided by this number to derive their vapour density. For example, acetone has a vapour density of 2 in relation to air. That means acetone vapour is twice as heavy as air. This can be seen by dividing the molecular weight of Acetone, 58.1 by that of air, 28.97, which equals 2.

With this definition, the vapour density would indicate whether a gas is denser (greater than one) or less dense (less than one) than air. The density has implications for container storage and personnel safety—if a container can release a dense gas, its vapour could sink and, if flammable, collect until it is at a concentration sufficient for ignition. Even if not flammable, it could collect in the lower floor or level of a confined space and displace air, possibly presenting an asphyxiation hazard to individuals entering the lower part of that space.

== See also ==
- Relative density (also known as specific gravity)
- Victor Meyer apparatus
