= Nitronate monooxygenase =

Class of enzymes

Identifiers
- EC no.: 1.13.12.16

Databases
- IntEnz: IntEnz view
- BRENDA: BRENDA entry
- ExPASy: NiceZyme view
- KEGG: KEGG entry
- MetaCyc: metabolic pathway
- PRIAM: profile
- PDB structures: RCSB PDB PDBe PDBsum
Search
- PMC: articles
- PubMed: articles
- NCBI: proteins

Nitronate monooxygenase (EC 1.13.12.16, NMO) is an enzyme with systematic name nitronate:oxygen 2-oxidoreductase (nitrite-forming). This enzyme catalyses the following chemical reaction

ethylnitronate + O_{2} $\rightleftharpoons$ acetaldehyde + nitrite + other products

The enzymes from the fungus Neurospora crassa and the yeast Williopsis saturnus var. mrakii contain non-covalently bound FMN as the cofactor.

== See also ==
- Nitronate
