= Myron L. Bender =

American biochemist

Myron Lee Bender
- Born: 1924; St. Louis, Missouri
- Died: 1988 (aged 63–64)
- Education: Purdue University (B.S., Ph.D.)
- Known for: Hass–Bender oxidation, studies of enzyme mechanisms
- Spouse: Muriel S. Bender
- Awards: Midwest Award of the American Chemical Society, 1972.
- Scientific career
- Fields: Reaction mechanisms, biochemistry of enzyme action.
- Institutions: Harvard University, University of Connecticut, University of Chicago, Illinois Institute of Technology, Northwestern University
- Doctoral advisor: Henry B. Hass
- Other academic advisors: Paul D. Barlett, Frank H. Westheimer

Myron Lee Bender (1924–1988) was born in St. Louis, Missouri. He obtained his B.S. (1944) and his Ph.D. (1948) from Purdue University. The latter was under the direction of Henry B. Hass. After postdoctoral research under Paul D. Barlett (Harvard University), and Frank H. Westheimer (University of Chicago), he spent one year as a faculty member at the University of Connecticut. Thereafter, he was a professor of Chemistry at Illinois Institute of Technology in 1951, and then at Northwestern University in 1960. He worked primarily in the study of reaction mechanisms and the biochemistry of enzyme action. Myron L. Bender demonstrated the two-step mechanism of catalysis for serine proteases, nucleophilic catalysis in ester hydrolysis and intramolecular catalysis in water. He also showed that cyclodextrin can be used to investigate catalysis of organic reactions within the scope of host–guest chemistry. Finally, he and others reported on the synthesis of an organic compound as a model of an acylchymotrypsin intermediate.

During his career, Myron L. Bender was an active member of the Chicago Section of the American Chemical Society. He was elected a Fellow of Merton College, Oxford University, and to the National Academy of Sciences, the latter in 1968. He received an honorary degree from Purdue University in 1969. He was the recipient of the Midwest Award of the American Chemical Society in 1972.

Professor Bender retired from Northwestern in 1988. Both he and his wife, Muriel S. Bender, died that year.

== Research ==
=== Research papers ===
Bender's initial work concerned mechanisms of chemical reactions, and although this continued through his career he became increasingly interested in enzyme mechanisms, especially that of α-chymotrypsin. Later he broadened his interest to encompass other enzymes, such as acetylcholinesterase and carboxypeptidase, and others.

Bender pioneered the use of p-nitrophenyl acetate as a model substrate for studying proteolysis, as it is particularly convenient in spectroscopic experiments. He likewise used imidazole as a model catalyst for shedding light on enzyme action.

He also studied artificial enzymes, starting with modified subtilisin in which a serine residue was replaced by cysteine (replacing an ester group with a thiol). Polgar and Bender laid stress on the fact that the modified enzyme was catalytically active, whereas Koshland and Neet, who made essentially the same observation the same year, drew the opposite conclusion, that despite replacing group with one in principle more reactive, the modified enzyme was less effective as a catalyst than the unmodified enzyme. Philipp and Bender later did a detailed study of the catalytic differences between native subtilisin and thiolsubtilisin. Bender also studied other artificial enzymes, such as cycloamyloses, that were not simply modified natural enzymes.

Bender may have been the first to recognize that the specificity constant ($k_\mathrm{cat}/K_\mathrm{m}$, the ratio of catalytic constant to Michaelis constant) provides the best measure of enzyme specificity, and to use the term specificity constant for it, as later recommended by the IUBMB. Philipp and Bender proposed that this specificity constant is the same as the second-order rate constant for enzyme-substrate binding for the most active substrates.

=== Reviews ===
Bender authored or co-authored several reviews, for example summarizing several years' work on α-chymotrypsin, and proteolytic enzymes in general.

=== Books ===
Bender's books primarily concerned catalysis, especially catalysis by enzymes and its underlying chemistry, and also cyclodextrin chemistry;

== Bender Distinguished Summer Lecturers ==
The series of Myron L. Bender & Muriel S. Bender Distinguished Summer Lectures in Organic Chemistry was established in 1989 and hosted by the Department of Chemistry at Northwestern University. The scientists who have given these lectures include Julius Rebek (1990), JoAnne Stubbe (1992), Peter B. Dervan (1993), Marye Anne Fox (1994), Richard Lerner (1995), Eric Jacobsen (1997), Larry E. Overman (1998), Ronald Breslow (1999), Jean Fréchet (2000), Dale Boger (2001), |Barbara Imperiali (2003), François Diederich (2004), Christopher T. Walsh (2008), Stephen L. Buchwald (2009), Paul Wender (2010), and Kendall Houk (2011).

== See also ==
- 2-Methylbenzaldehyde
- Tetrahedral carbonyl addition compound
