= Nitromethane (data page) =

Chemical data page

This page provides supplementary chemical data on nitromethane.

== Material Safety Data Sheet ==
The handling of this chemical may incur notable safety precautions. MSDS is available from Mallinckrodt Baker.

== Structure and properties ==
Structure and properties
Dielectric constant, ε_{r}	37.27 ε_{0} at 20 °C
Surface tension	39.04 dyn/cm at 10 °C; 36.53 dyn/cm at 25 °C; 32.33 dyn/cm at 50 °C

== Thermodynamic properties ==
Phase behavior
Triple point	244.77 K (−23.38 °C), ? Pa
Std entropy change of fusion, Δ_{fus}S^{~~o~~}	39.6 J/(mol·K)
Std entropy change of vaporization, Δ_{vap}S^{~~o~~}	128.36 J/(mol·K)
Solid properties
Liquid properties
Gas properties
Std enthalpy change of formation, Δ_{f}H^{~~o~~}_{gas}	−80.8 kJ/mol
Standard molar entropy, S^{~~o~~}_{gas}	282.9 J/(mol·K)
Heat capacity, c_{p}	55.5 J/(mol·K) at 25 °C

== Vapor pressure of liquid ==
P in mm Hg	1	10	40	100	400	760
T in °C	−29.0	2.8	27.5	46.6	82.0	101.2

Table data obtained from CRC Handbook of Chemistry and Physics 44th ed.

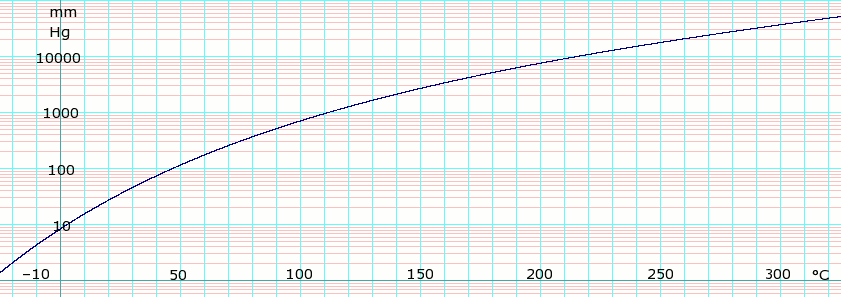
log_{10} of Nitromethane vapor pressure. Uses formula: $\scriptstyle \log_e P_{mmHg} =$$\scriptstyle \log_e (\frac {760} {101.325}) - 10.20778\log_e(T+273.15) - \frac {7217.173} {T+273.15} + 83.18124 + 8.369119 \times 10^{-06} (T+273.15)^2$ obtained from CHERIC

== Distillation data ==
Vapor-liquid Equilibrium for Nitromethane/Ethanol; P = 730 mm Hg
BP Temp. °C	% by mole ethanol
BP Temp. °C	liquid	vapor
97.7	3.0	15.7
93.4	4.7	22.3
88.9	8.5	32.9
86.1	12.2	39.5
83.6	16.6	45.3
80.6	25.6	52.9
79.2	31.8	56.3
77.9	45.1	63.5
77.0	53.9	66.9
77.1	58.9	68.6
76.5	64.6	70.5
76.4	72.4	74.0
76.6	78.7	77.3
76.5	81.9	79.4
76.7	85.9	82.2
76.9	91.4	87.1
77.7	95.3	93.0
77.8	97.3	96.5

Vapor-liquid Equilibrium for Nitromethane/Methanol; P = 730 mm Hg
BP Temp. °C	% by mole methanol
BP Temp. °C	liquid	vapor
96.9	1.5	13.3
93.1	2.6	22.8
89.1	4.8	33.4
84.8	7.5	42.9
82.1	9.6	48.4
77.9	15.2	57.0
72.9	25.4	67.3
71.1	31.4	70.4
68.2	42.6	74.7
67.3	49.3	76.1
65.6	67.8	81.8
65.1	74.7	83.8
65.0	81.3	86.4
64.6	88.6	90.1
64.5	91.4	92.1
64.4	96.0	95.6
64.5	99.4	99.3

== Spectral data ==
This box:
- Except where noted otherwise, data relate to Standard temperature and pressure.
- Reliability of data general note.

== Cited sources ==
- Haynes, William M., ed. (2011). CRC Handbook of Chemistry and Physics (92nd ed.). CRC Press. ISBN 978-1439855119.
