= Dinitromethane =

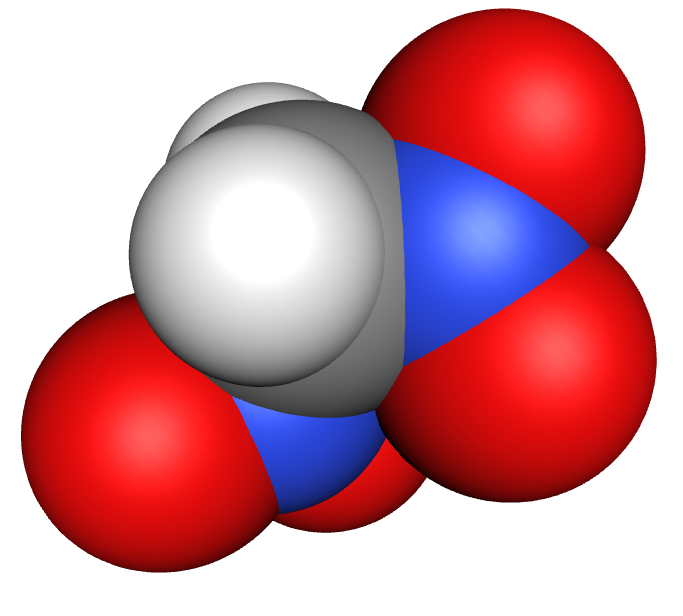

Names
- Preferred IUPAC name Dinitromethane

Identifiers
CAS Number	625-76-3
3D model (JSmol)	Interactive image
ChemSpider	55118
PubChem CID	61172
CompTox Dashboard (EPA)	DTXSID50211548
- InChI: InChI=1S/CH2N2O4/c4-2(5)1-3(6)7/h1H2 Key: WINNISSSXBRWMA-UHFFFAOYSA-N; InChI=1/CH2N2O4/c4-2(5)1-3(6)7/h1H2 Key: WINNISSSXBRWMA-UHFFFAOYAE
- SMILES: C([N+](=O)[O-])[N+](=O)[O-]

Properties
Chemical formula	CH_{2}N_{2}O_{4}
Molar mass	106.037 g·mol^{−1}
Appearance	Colorless liquid
Odor	Pleasant
Boiling point	39 to 40 °C (102 to 104 °F; 312 to 313 K) (at 2 mmHg)
- Except where otherwise noted, data are given for materials in their standard state (at 25 °C [77 °F], 100 kPa). verify (what is ?) Infobox references

Dinitromethane is an organic compound with the chemical formula CH_{2}(NO_{2})_{2}. Purified dinitromethane is a colorless liquid with a weak pleasant odor. It is relatively stable at room temperature and can be safely stored for months at 0 °C.

== Synthesis ==
The conjugate base of dinitromethane, dinitromethanide, was first prepared in 1884 by reduction of bromodinitromethane using hydrogen sulfide as its potassium salt. Several years later, the neutral dinitromethane compound was prepared by reacting potassium dinitromethanide with hydrogen fluoride and diethyl ether. Free dinitromethane was previously understood to be a pale, yellow oil that decomposed rapidly at ambient temperatures. Several other synthetic methods for producing various dinitromethanide salts were later reported.

== Safety ==
The transportation of dinitromethane is forbidden by the U.S. Department of Transportation.

== Related ==
- Nitromethane
- Trinitromethane
- Tetranitromethane
