= Lactamide =

Names
- Preferred IUPAC name 2-Hydroxypropanamide
- Other names 2-Hydroxypropionamide; Lactic acid amide; Lactic amide; α-Hydroxypropionamide

Identifiers
CAS Number	2043-43-8; 598-81-2 (R); 89673-71-2 (S)
3D model (JSmol)	Interactive image
ChEBI	CHEBI:75144
ChemSpider	85030
ECHA InfoCard	100.016.410
PubChem CID	94220
UNII	4JZP7XJN3O
CompTox Dashboard (EPA)	DTXSID90862816
- InChI: InChI=1S/C3H7NO2/c1-2(5)3(4)6/h2,5H,1H3,(H2,4,6) Key: SXQFCVDSOLSHOQ-UHFFFAOYSA-N; InChI=1/C3H7NO2/c1-2(5)3(4)6/h2,5H,1H3,(H2,4,6) Key: SXQFCVDSOLSHOQ-UHFFFAOYAP
- SMILES: O=C(N)C(O)C

Properties
Chemical formula	C_{3}H_{7}NO_{2}
Molar mass	89.094 g·mol^{−1}
Melting point	73 to 76 °C (163 to 169 °F; 346 to 349 K)
- Except where otherwise noted, data are given for materials in their standard state (at 25 °C [77 °F], 100 kPa). Infobox references

Lactamide is an amide derived from lactic acid. It is a white crystalline solid with a melting point of 73-76 °C.

Lactamide can be prepared by the catalytic hydration of lactonitrile.
