= Wilhelm Weith =

German-Swiss chemist (1846–1881)

Wilhelm Weith (9 May 1846 in Bad Homburg vor der Höhe – 29 November 1881 in Ajaccio) was a German-Swiss chemist.

He studied chemistry at the polytechnic institute in Zürich and at the University of Heidelberg, receiving his doctorate in 1865 from the University of Zürich. Shortly afterwards, he obtained his habilitation and became a lecturer at both the polyclinic and university. At Zürich, he often served as a substitute teacher for chemist Georg Städeler. In 1871 he became an associate professor of chemistry, followed by a full professorship in 1874. He died from an illness during a stay in Ajaccio, Corsica on 28 November 1881, aged 35.

He primary research involved studies of sulfurous aniline derivatives, carbotriphenyltriamine and guanamines. Among his earlier works was a treatise on nitroprussides (1868). In 1880 he published a study on the correlation between the fauna and the chemical composition of Swiss waters, titled Chemische Untersuchungen schweizerischer Gewässer mit Rücksicht auf deren Fauna.
