= Hydroxymandelonitrile lyase =

Class of enzymes

hydroxymandelonitrile lyase

Identifiers
- EC no.: 4.1.2.11
- CAS no.: 9075-38-1

Databases
- IntEnz: IntEnz view
- BRENDA: BRENDA entry
- ExPASy: NiceZyme view
- KEGG: KEGG entry
- MetaCyc: metabolic pathway
- PRIAM: profile
- PDB structures: RCSB PDB PDBe PDBsum
- Gene Ontology: AmiGO / QuickGO
Search
- PMC: articles
- PubMed: articles
- NCBI: proteins

In enzymology, a hydroxymandelonitrile lyase (EC 4.1.2.11) is an enzyme that catalyzes the chemical reaction

(S)-4-hydroxymandelonitrile $\rightleftharpoons$ cyanide + 4-hydroxybenzaldehyde

This enzyme belongs to the family of lyases, specifically the aldehyde-lyases, which cleave carbon-carbon bonds. The systematic name of this enzyme class is (S)-4-hydroxymandelonitrile 4-hydroxybenzaldehyde-lyase (cyanide-forming). Other names in common use include hydroxynitrile lyase, oxynitrilase, Sorghum hydroxynitrile lyase, and (S)-4-hydroxymandelonitrile hydroxybenzaldehyde-lyase. This enzyme participates in cyanoamino acid metabolism.

== Structural studies ==
As of late 2007, only one structure has been solved for this class of enzymes, with the PDB accession code 1GXS.
