= Nitronate =

General chemical structure of a nitronate

A nitronate (IUPAC: azinate) in organic chemistry is an anion with the general structure R^{1}R^{2}C=N^{+}(−O^{−})_{2}, containing the =N^{+}(−O^{−})_{2} functional group, where R can be hydrogen, halogen, organyl group or other groups. It is the anion of nitronic acid R^{1}R^{2}C=N^{+}(−O^{−})−OH (sometimes also called an aci-nitro compound, or an azinic acid), a tautomeric form of a nitro compound. Just as aldehydes and ketones can exist in equilibrium with their enol tautomer, nitro compounds exist in equilibrium with their nitronate tautomer under basic conditions. In practice they are formed by the deprotonation of the α-carbon, the pK_{a} of which is typically around 17.

Nitronates are formed as intermediates in the Henry reaction, Hass–Bender oxidation and Nef reaction, the latter of which also demonstrates the instability of the nitronic acid form. The nitronate has two different resonance structures, one with a negative charge on the α-carbon and a double bond between the nitrogen and one of the oxygens, and another resonance structure with a double bond between the nitrogen and the α-carbon, and single bonds between the nitrogen and the oxygens.

== See also ==
- Nitronate monooxygenase
