= (S)-hydroxynitrile lyase =

Class of enzymes

Identifiers
- EC no.: 4.1.2.47

Databases
- IntEnz: IntEnz view
- BRENDA: BRENDA entry
- ExPASy: NiceZyme view
- KEGG: KEGG entry
- MetaCyc: metabolic pathway
- PRIAM: profile
- PDB structures: RCSB PDB PDBe PDBsum
Search
- PMC: articles
- PubMed: articles
- NCBI: proteins

(S)-hydroxynitrile lyase (EC 4.1.2.47, (S)-cyanohydrin producing hydroxynitrile lyase, (S)-oxynitrilase, (S)-HbHNL, (S)-MeHNL, hydroxynitrile lyase, oxynitrilase, HbHNL, MeHNL, (S)-selective hydroxynitrile lyase, (S)-cyanohydrin carbonyl-lyase (cyanide forming), hydroxynitrilase) is an enzyme with systematic name (S)-cyanohydrin lyase (cyanide forming). This enzyme catalyses the interconversion between cyanohydrins and the carbonyl compounds derived from the cyanohydrin with free cyanide, as in the following two chemical reactions:

- an aliphatic (S)-hydroxynitrile $\rightleftharpoons$ an aliphatic aldehyde or ketone + cyanide
- an aromatic (S)-hydroxynitrile $\rightleftharpoons$ an aromatic aldehyde + cyanide

In nature, the liberation of cyanide serves as a defense mechanism against herbivores and microbial attack in plants. Hydroxynitrile lyases of the α/β hydrolase fold are closely related to esterases. All members of the α/β hydrolase fold contain a conserved catalytic triad (nucleophile-histidine-aspartate). The nucleophile in this case is a serine. In contrast to esterases, serine proteases, lipases and other enzymes in this family, the nucleophile in hydroxynitrile lyases functions as a proton acceptor. Key amino acid residues in this reaction are the lysine at position 236 and the threonine at position 11. Lys^{236} helps to orient the substrate while Thr^{11} serves to block the oxyanion hole that would convert the enzyme into an esterase.

Commonly studied (S)-selective hydroxynitrile lyases include MeHNL from Manihot esculenta and HbHNL from Hevea brasiliensis. (R)-selective hydroxynitrile lyases have also been found to exist in Arabidopsis thaliana (AtHNL). AtHNL is thought to catalyze this reaction by a different mechanism.

Not all hydroxynitrile lyases belong to the α/β hydrolase family. PaHNL (Prunus amygdalus), (R)-selective like AtHNL, uses a flavin cofactor to catalyze cyanogenesis.

== Natural Substrates of Hydroxynitrile Lyases ==
Acetone cyanohydrin has been determined to be the natural substrate of HbHNL, though HbHNL also shows activity with mandelonitrile, the natural substrate of PaHNL. The cleavage of mandelonitrile into benzaldehyde and cyanide is what produces the characteristic amaretto smell of almonds. The natural substrate of AtHNL is unknown as no cyanohydrins have been detected in Arabidopis thaliana.

== Unnatural Substrates ==
In addition to cyanohydrin cleavage, HNLs have been found to catalyze the nitroaldol reaction at low levels.
