= Victor Meyer apparatus =

The Victor Meyer apparatus is the standard laboratory method for determining the molecular weight of a volatile liquid. It was developed by Viktor Meyer, who spelled his name Victor in publications at the time of its development. In this method, a known mass of a volatile solid or liquid under examination is converted is carefully vaporized in a tube, while measuring the volume of air displaced. The molar quantity of evaporate can then be calculated via the ideal gas law, and thence (since the mass is known) the molar mass.

== Apparatus ==
The apparatus consists of a vertical glass column contained in a steam jacket, with a small bed of sand in the bottom of the column to protect its glass base. A delivery tube leads from the top of the column to a gas jar in a trough of water. A small glass vial with a ground glass stopper is at the top of the column, containing a weighed quantity of the liquid to be tested. The vial rests on a device called the spoon, which can be rotated to release the vial.

When the spoon is rotated, the vial drops to the bottom of the column. The liquid vaporises, ejecting the stopper from the vial and displacing a volume of air equal to the volume of the vaporised liquid at 100°C, the temperature being controlled by the presence of the two phases of boiling fluid in the steam jacket. This air is collected in the gas jar, and its volume measured.

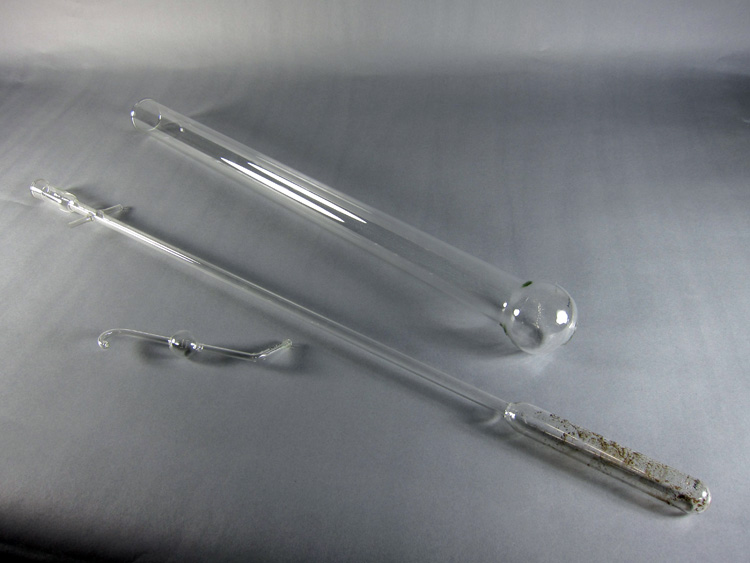
Meyer vapor density apparatus

== Temperature sensitivity ==
This method possess the advantage of being applicable over a considerable range of temperature. Provided the temperature of the outer tube is constant and high enough to cause rapid vapourisation of the substance, the actual temperature employed need not be known because the volume of air displaced and collected in the measuring tube is at the temperature of the water in the glass column. The vapour of the substance occupies the same volume which the air would have occupied at the temperature of vapourisation.
