= Nitroalkene =

A nitroalkene, or nitro olefin, is a functional group combining the functionality of its constituent parts, an alkene and nitro group, while displaying its own chemical properties through alkene activation, making the functional group useful in specialty reactions such as the Michael reaction or Diels-Alder additions.

== Synthesis ==
Nitroalkenes are synthesized by various means, notable examples include:

- Nitroaldol reactions such as the Henry reaction:

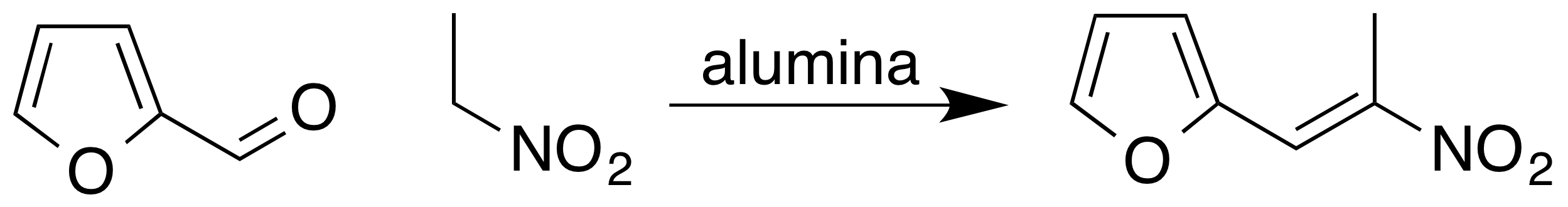

- Nitration of an alkene with nitryl iodide generated in-situ from silver nitrite and elemental iodine:

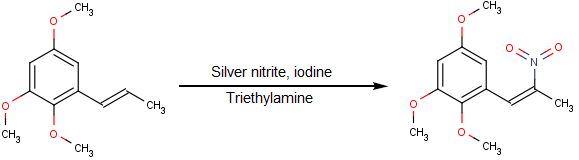

- Direct nitration of alkenes with nitric oxide and an aluminum oxide catalyst in acidic conditions:

- Direct nitration of alkenes with Clayfen (Iron(III) nitrate supported on Montmorillonite clay):

- Dehydration of nitro-alcohols:

- In the "nitro-Hunsdiecker" reaction, nitric acid and a radical initiator convert a vinylcarboxylic acid to the corresponding nitroalkene:

R_{2}C=CR′CO_{2}H + HNO_{3} → R_{2}C=CR′NO_{2} + H_{2}O + CO_{2} (net)

== Reactions ==
Nitroalkenes are useful intermediates for various chemical functionalities.

- A nitroalkene behaving as a Michael acceptor in the synthesis of Lycoricidine:

- Nitroalkene acting as an activated dienophile toward butadiene in a Diels-Alder cycloaddition:

- The synthesis of pyrrole derivatives via the Barton–Zard reaction:

- Pericyclic reaction of a nitroalkene yielding an indole:

- Partial hydrogenation to an alkene baring a hydroxylamine functional group:

- Reduction to primary amines:

- Asymmetric Stetter reaction:

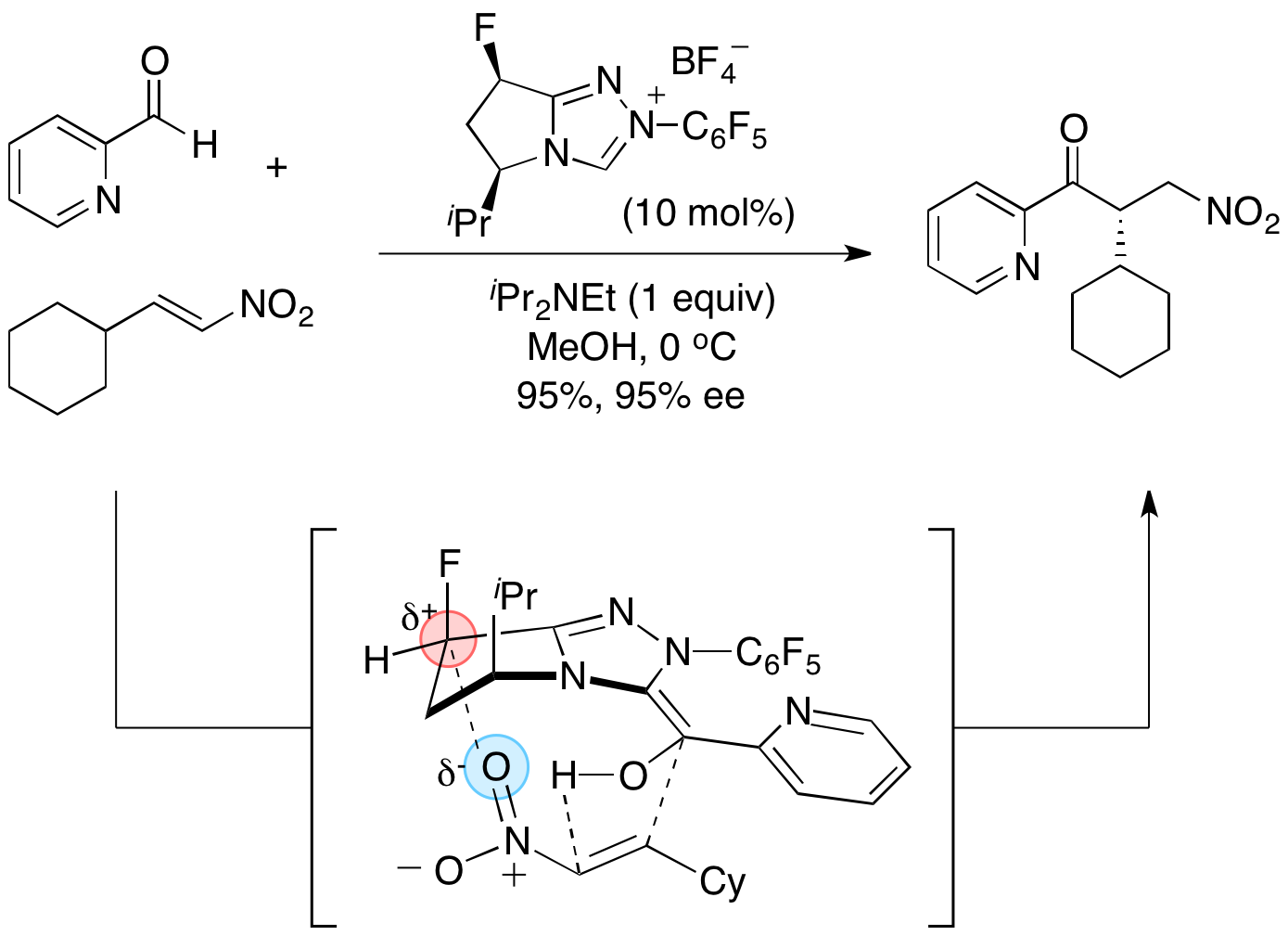

== Nitroalkynes ==
The related nitroalkynes are rather unstable, easily losing nitrogen dioxide radicals, rearranging to nitriles over −40 °C, or adding nucleophiles. Fewer than 20 had been synthesized before 2014. Nitration of metalloalkynes requires nearly-bare nitronium, i.e. nitronium tetrafluoroborate or nitric anhydride. In contrast, Tilden's reagent suffices to nitrosylate metalloalkynes; the products then oxidize to nitroalkenes in peroxyacids. Protected nitroalkene dehydroiodination occurs delicately in the gas phase.
