= 1-Nitropropane =

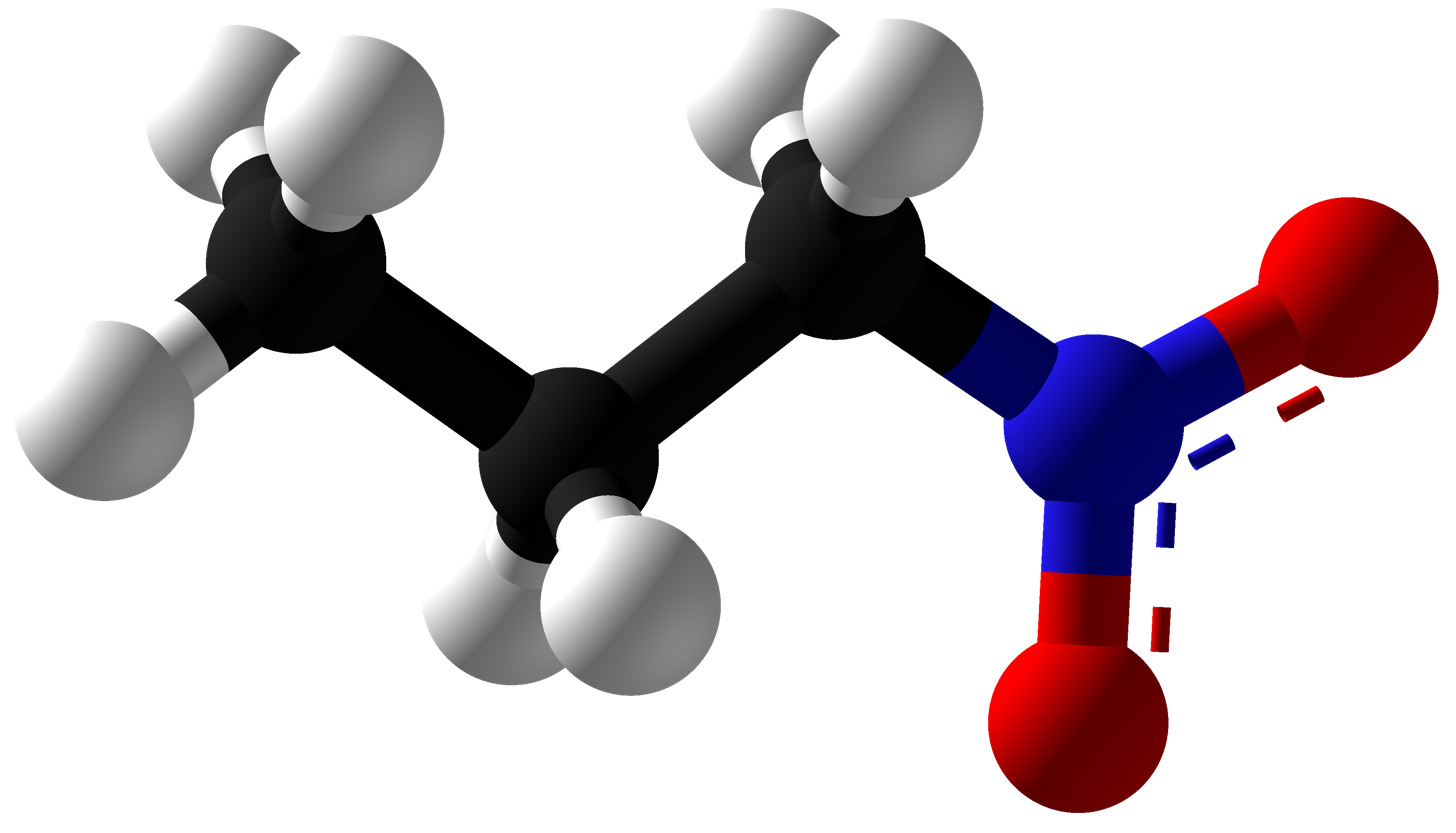

Names
- Preferred IUPAC name 1-Nitropropane

Identifiers
CAS Number	108-03-2
3D model (JSmol)	Interactive image
Abbreviations	1-NP; NNP; PrNO_{2} n-PrNO_{2} nPrNO_{2}^{n}PrNO_{2}
ChEBI	CHEBI:76261
ChemSpider	7615
ECHA InfoCard	100.003.223
EC Number	203-544-9
MeSH	C035314
PubChem CID	7903
UNII	39W305OW99
CompTox Dashboard (EPA)	DTXSID1020980
- InChI: InChI=1S/C3H7NO2/c1-3(2)4(5)6/h3H,1-2H3 Key: FGLBSLMDCBOPQK-UHFFFAOYSA-N; InChI=1/C3H7NO2/c1-3(2)4(5)6/h3H,1-2H3 Key: FGLBSLMDCBOPQK-UHFFFAOYAM
- SMILES: CCC[N+](=O)[O-]

Properties
Chemical formula	C_{3}H_{7}NO_{2}
Molar mass	89.094 g·mol^{−1}
Appearance	Colorless liquid
Odor	Disagreeable
Density	0.998 g/cm^{3}
Melting point	−108 °C (−162 °F; 165 K)
Boiling point	132 °C (270 °F; 405 K)
Solubility in water	1.4 mg/L
Solubility	soluble in chloroform
Vapor pressure	8 mmHg (20°C)
Acidity (pK_{a})	17.0
Viscosity	0.844 cP

Hazards
NFPA 704 (fire diamond)	3 3 2
Flash point	35 °C (95 °F; 308 K)
Autoignition temperature	420 °C (788 °F; 693 K)
Explosive limits	2.6-11.0%
- Lethal dose or concentration (LD, LC)
LD_{50} (median dose)	800 mg/kg (mouse, oral); 455 mg/kg (rat, oral)
LD_{Lo} (lowest published)	250 mg/kg (rabbit, oral)
LC_{50} (median concentration)	3100 ppm (rat, 8 hr)
- NIOSH (US health exposure limits)
PEL (Permissible)	TWA 25 ppm (90 mg/m^{3})
REL (Recommended)	TWA 25 ppm (90 mg/m^{3})
IDLH (Immediate danger)	1000 ppm
- Except where otherwise noted, data are given for materials in their standard state (at 25 °C [77 °F], 100 kPa). Infobox references

1-Nitropropane (1-NP) is a solvent. It is a colorless liquid, an isomer of 2-nitropropane (2-NP), and classified as a nitro compound.

== Preparation ==
1-nitropropane is produced industrially by the reaction of propane and nitric acid. This reaction forms four nitroalkanes: nitromethane, nitroethane, 1-nitropropane, and 2-nitropropane. 1-nitropropane is also a byproduct of the process for making 2-nitropropane, which is done by vapour phase nitration of propane.

== Uses ==
Most 1-nitropropane is used as a starting material for other compounds. The other uses are solvent-based paints, solvent-based inks and adhesives, and as a solvent for chemical reactions.

== Safety ==
1-nitropropane is toxic to humans and can cause damage to the kidneys and liver. The vapours are irritating for the lungs and eyes and the maximum exposure rate is 25 ppm. It is not known to be a carcinogen.

== Reactions ==
1-nitropropane decomposes under the influence of heat into toxic gases. It also reacts violently with oxidizing agents and strong bases.
