= Nitro compound =

Organic compound containing an –NO2 group

The structure of an organic nitro compound

In organic chemistry, nitro compounds are organic compounds that contain one or more nitro functional groups (−NO_{2}). The nitro group is one of the most common explosophores (functional group that makes a compound explosive) used globally. The nitro group is also strongly electron-withdrawing. Because of this property, C−H bonds alpha (adjacent) to the nitro group can be acidic. For similar reasons, the presence of nitro groups in aromatic compounds retards electrophilic aromatic substitution but facilitates nucleophilic aromatic substitution. Nitro groups are rarely found in nature. They are almost invariably produced by nitration reactions starting with nitric acid.

== Synthesis ==
=== Preparation of aromatic nitro compounds ===
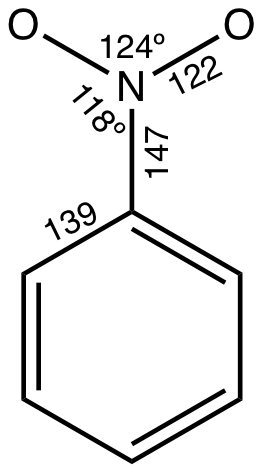
Structural details of nitrobenzene, distances in picometers.

Aromatic nitro compounds are typically synthesized by nitration with nitric acid and sulfuric acid. The active intermediate is the nitronium ion (NO^{+}_{2}), an electrophile:

+
H^{+}

The nitration product produced on largest scale, by far, is nitrobenzene. Many explosives are produced by nitration including trinitrophenol (picric acid), trinitrotoluene (TNT), and trinitroresorcinol (styphnic acid).

In some cases, nitroarenes are produced through nucleophilic substitution, as in the Zinke nitration of phenols.

=== Preparation of aliphatic nitro compounds ===
Aliphatic nitro compounds can be synthesized by various methods; notable examples include:

- Free radical nitration of alkanes. The reaction produces fragments from the parent alkane, creating a diverse mixture of products; for instance, nitromethane, nitroethane, 1-nitropropane, and 2-nitropropane are produced by treating propane with nitric acid in the gas phase (e.g. 350–450 °C and 8–12 atm).
- Nucleophilic substitution reactions of silver nitrite onto primary halocarbons or organosulfates (the Meyer synthesis).
- Oxidation of oximes or primary amines.
- Reduction of β-nitro alcohols or nitroalkenes.
- By decarboxylation of α-nitro carboxylic acids (a variant of the Krapcho decarboxylation). The latter can be formed via α-nitration, e.g. between nitriles and ethyl nitrate; or a Meyer-type reaction with a halocarboxylic acid. For example, nitromethane can be produced in the laboratory by treating sodium chloroacetate with sodium nitrite. (In general, alkali nitrites are unsuitable for Meyer reactions, as they give an equilibrium of mostly nitrite esters; but decarboxylation drives the initial equilibrium to the nitro product.)

==== ter Meer reaction ====
In nucleophilic aliphatic substitution, sodium nitrite (NaNO_{2}) replaces an alkyl halide. In the ter Meer reaction, named after Edmund ter Meer, who first reported it in 1876, the reactant is a 1,1-halonitroalkane:

The reaction mechanism is proposed in which in the first slow step a proton is abstracted from nitroalkane 1 to a carbanion 2 followed by protonation to an aci-nitro 3 and finally nucleophilic displacement of chlorine by an acyl substitution-like process. When the same reactant is reacted with potassium hydroxide the reaction product is the 1,2-dinitro dimer.

== Occurrence ==
=== In nature ===
Chloramphenicol is a rare example of a naturally occurring nitro compound. At least some naturally occurring nitro groups arose by the oxidation of amino groups. 2-Nitrophenol is an aggregation pheromone of ticks.

Examples of nitro compounds are rare in nature. 3-Nitropropionic acid found in fungi and plants (Indigofera). Nitropentadecene is a defense compound found in termites. Aristolochic acids are found in the flowering plant family Aristolochiaceae. Nitrophenylethane is found in Aniba canelilla. Nitrophenylethane is also found in members of the Annonaceae, Lauraceae and Papaveraceae.

=== In pharmaceuticals ===
Despite the occasional use in pharmaceuticals, the nitro group is associated with mutagenicity and genotoxicity and therefore is often regarded as a liability in the drug discovery process.

== Reactions ==
Nitro compounds participate in several organic reactions, the most important being reduction of nitro compounds to the corresponding amines:

RNO_{2} + 3 H_{2} → RNH_{2} + 2 H_{2}O

Virtually all aromatic amines (e.g. aniline) are derived from nitroaromatics through such catalytic hydrogenation. A variation is formation of a dimethylaminoarene with palladium on carbon and formaldehyde:

Nitro compound hydrogenation

The α-carbon of nitroalkanes is somewhat acidic. The pK_{a} values of nitromethane and 2-nitropropane are respectively 17.2 and 16.9 in dimethyl sulfoxide (DMSO) solution, suggesting an aqueous pK_{a} of around 11. In other words, these carbon acids can be deprotonated in aqueous solution. The conjugate base is called a nitronate, and behaves similar to an enolate. In the nitroaldol reaction, it adds directly to aldehydes, and, with enones, can serve as a Michael donor. Conversely, a nitroalkene reacts with enols as a Michael acceptor. Nitrosating a nitronate gives a nitrolic acid.

Nitronates are also key intermediates in the Nef reaction: when exposed to acids or oxidants, a nitronate hydrolyzes to a carbonyl and (respectively) azanone or nitric acid.

Grignard reagents combine with nitro compounds to give a nitrone; but a Grignard reagent with an α hydrogen will then add again to the nitrone to give a hydroxylamine salt.

The nitro moiety is a mild photosensitizer, and EUV irradiation of a nitroarene can lead to either oxidation of another compound (the nitroarene being itself reduced to a hydroxylamine) or radical-nucleophilic aromatic substitution.

=== Dye syntheses ===
The Leimgruber–Batcho, Bartoli and Baeyer–Emmerling indole syntheses begin with aromatic nitro compounds. Indigo can be synthesized in a condensation reaction from ortho-nitrobenzaldehyde and acetone in strongly basic conditions in a reaction known as the Baeyer–Drewsen indigo synthesis.

=== Biochemical reactions ===
Many flavin-dependent enzymes are capable of oxidizing aliphatic nitro compounds to less-toxic aldehydes and ketones. Nitroalkane oxidase and 3-nitropropionate oxidase oxidize aliphatic nitro compounds exclusively, whereas other enzymes such as glucose oxidase have other physiological substrates.

=== Explosions ===
Explosive decomposition of organo nitro compounds are redox reactions, wherein both the oxidant (nitro group) and the fuel (hydrocarbon substituent) are bound within the same molecule. The explosion process generates heat by forming highly stable products including molecular nitrogen (N_{2}), carbon dioxide, and water. The explosive power of this redox reaction is enhanced because these stable products are gases at mild temperatures. Many contact explosives contain the nitro group.

== See also ==
- Functional group
- Reduction of nitro compounds
- Nitration
- Nitrite (also an NO_{2} group, but bonds differently)
- Nitroalkene
- Nitroglycerin
