= Hydroxynitrilase =

Class of enzymes

acetone-cyanhydrin lyase

Identifiers
- EC no.: 4.1.2.37
- CAS no.: 112567-89-2

Databases
- IntEnz: IntEnz view
- BRENDA: BRENDA entry
- ExPASy: NiceZyme view
- KEGG: KEGG entry
- MetaCyc: metabolic pathway
- PRIAM: profile
- PDB structures: RCSB PDB PDBe PDBsum
- Gene Ontology: AmiGO / QuickGO
Search
- PMC: articles
- PubMed: articles
- NCBI: proteins

In enzymology, a hydroxynitrilase (EC 4.1.2.37) is an enzyme that catalyzes the chemical reaction

acetone cyanohydrin $\rightleftharpoons$ cyanide + acetone

Hence, this enzyme has one substrate, acetone cyanohydrin, and two products, cyanide and acetone.

This enzyme belongs to the family of lyases, specifically the aldehyde-lyases, which cleave carbon-carbon bonds. The systematic name of this enzyme class is acetone-cyanohydrin acetone-lyase (cyanide-forming). Other names in common use include alpha-hydroxynitrile lyase, hydroxynitrile lyase, acetone-cyanhydrin lyase [mis-spelt], acetone-cyanohydrin acetone-lyase, oxynitrilase, 2-hydroxyisobutyronitrile acetone-lyase, 2-hydroxyisobutyronitrile acetone-lyase (cyanide-forming), and acetone-cyanohydrin lyase.
