= Henry reaction =

Chemical reaction

Named after	Louis Henry
Reaction type	Coupling reaction

Identifiers
Organic Chemistry Portal	henry-reaction
RSC ontology ID	RXNO:0000086

The Henry reaction is a classic carbon–carbon bond formation reaction in organic chemistry. Discovered in 1895 by the Belgian chemist Louis Henry (1834–1913), it is the combination of a nitroalkane and an aldehyde or ketone in the presence of a base to form β-nitro alcohols. This type of reaction is also referred to as a nitroaldol reaction (nitroalkane, aldehyde, and alcohol). It is nearly analogous to the aldol reaction that had been discovered 23 years prior that couples two carbonyl compounds to form β-hydroxy carbonyl compounds known as "aldols" (aldehyde and alcohol), with the only difference being the nitro group in the place of a carbonyl group in aldol reactions. Furthermore, the product of the Henry reaction can undergo dehydration upon heating analogously to aldol condensations.

The Henry reaction is a useful technique in the area of organic chemistry due to the synthetic utility of its corresponding products, as they can be easily converted to other useful synthetic intermediates. These conversions include subsequent dehydration to yield nitroalkenes, oxidation of the secondary alcohol to yield α-nitro ketones, or reduction of the nitro group to yield β-amino alcohols.

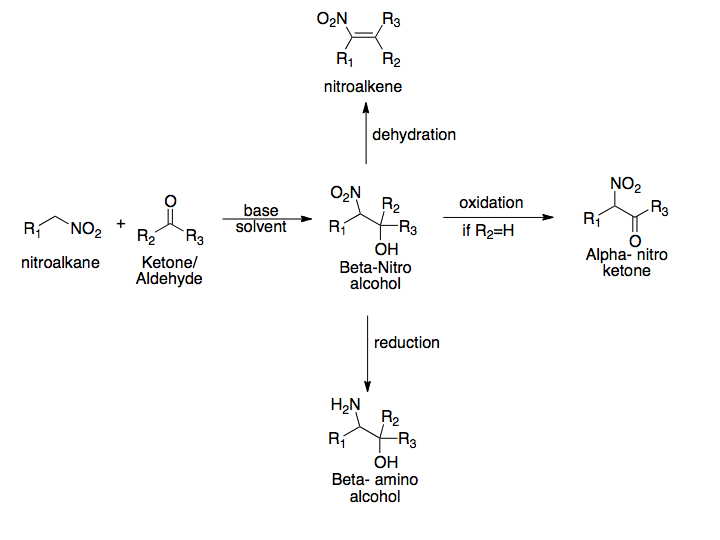
Henry reaction synthetic scheme

Many of these uses have been exemplified in the syntheses of various pharmaceuticals including the β-blocker (S)-propranolol, the HIV protease inhibitor Amprenavir (Vertex 478), and construction of the carbohydrate subunit of the anthracycline class of antibiotics, L-Acosamine. The synthetic scheme of the L-Acosamine synthesis can be found in the Examples section of this article.

== Mechanism ==
The Henry reaction begins with the deprotonation of the nitroalkane on the α-carbon position forming a nitronate. The pKa of most nitroalkanes in DMSO is approximately 17. Although this structure is nucleophilic both at the deprotonated carbon and at the oxy-anions of the nitro group, the observed result is of the carbon attacking the carbonyl compound. The resulting β-nitro alkoxide is protonated by the conjugate acid of the base that originally deprotonated the nitroalkyl structure, giving the respective β-nitro alcohol as product.

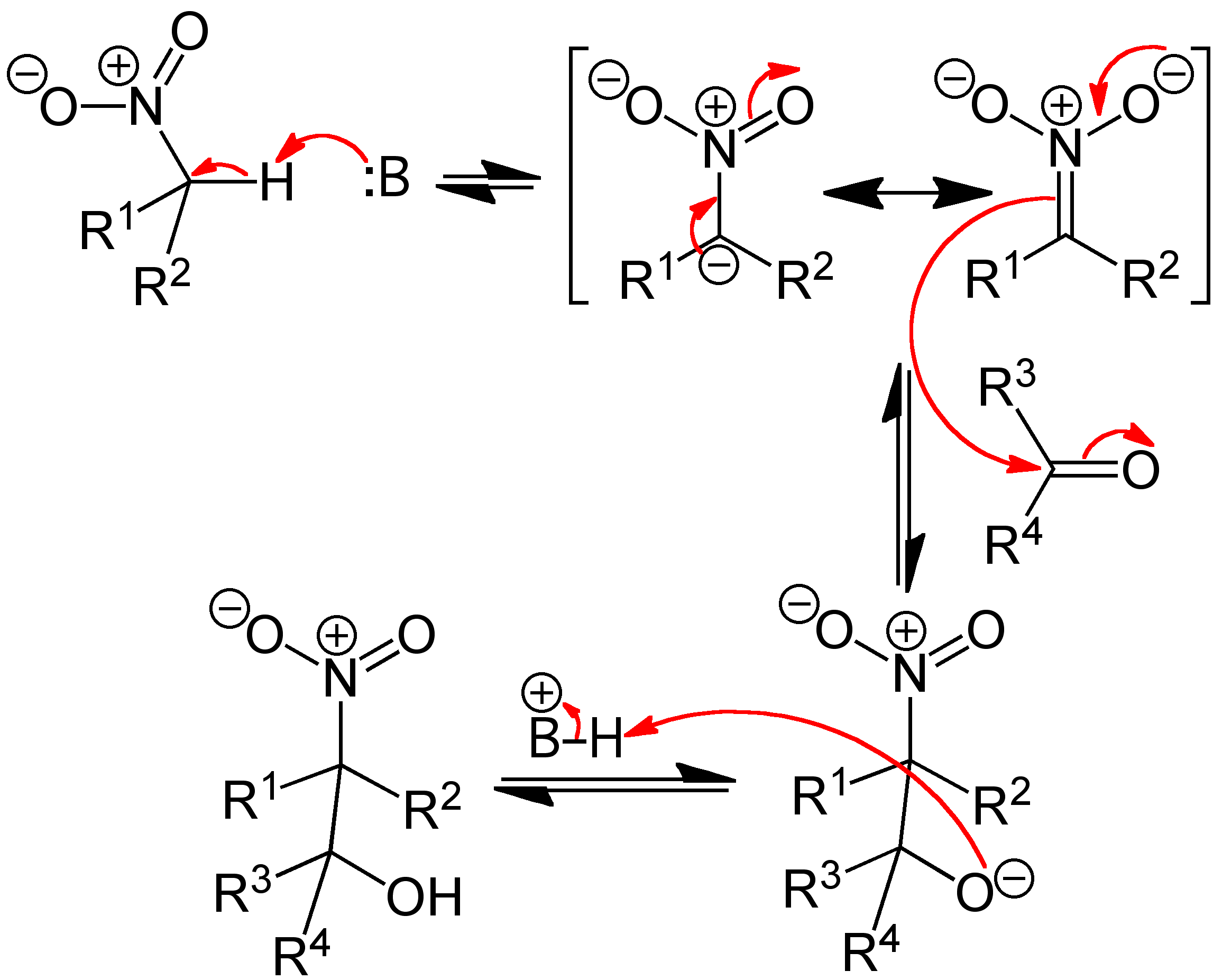
Henry reaction mechanism

All steps of the Henry reaction are reversible. The lack of a committed step in the reaction is a practical problem, with low yields common because the reaction does not run to completion. Various modifications have been reported that can improve this situation.

== Stereochemical course ==
The figure below illustrates one of the commonly accepted models for stereoselection without any modification to the Henry reaction. In this model, stereoselectivity is governed by the size of the R groups in the model (such as a carbon chain), as well as by a transition state that minimizes dipole by orienting the nitro group and carbonyl oxygen anti each other (on opposite sides of the molecule). The R groups play a role in the transition state of the Henry reaction: the larger the R groups on each of the substrates, the more they will tend to orient themselves away from each other (commonly referred to as steric effects).

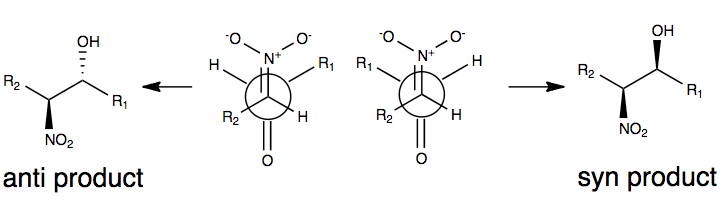
Henry stereoselection without modification

Due to the reversibility of the reaction and the tendency for easy epimerization of the nitro-substituted carbon atom (among a number of factors), the Henry reaction will typically produce a mixture of enantiomers or diastereomers. It is for this reason that explanations for stereoselectivity remain scarce without some modification of the reaction. In recent years, research focus has shifted toward modifications of the Henry reaction to overcome this synthetic challenge.

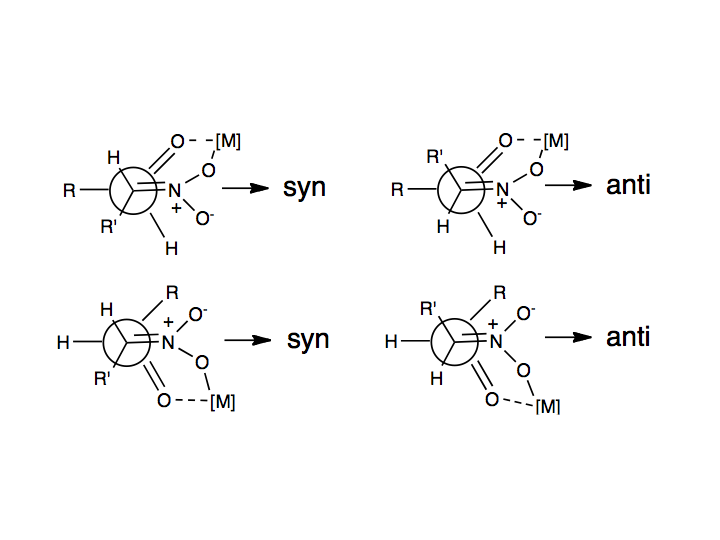
Henry reaction synthetic scheme

The first example of an enantioselective nitroaldol reaction was reported in 1992 using Shibasaki catalysts. One of the most frequently employed methods for inducing enantio- or diastereoselectivity in the Henry reaction is the use of chiral metal catalysts, in which the nitro group and carbonyl oxygen coordinate to a metal that is bound to a chiral organic molecule. Some metals that have been used include zinc, cobalt, copper, magnesium, and chromium. A depiction of this coordination is illustrated above.

== General Features ==
One of the many features of the Henry reaction that makes it synthetically attractive is that it utilizes only a catalytic amount of base to drive the reaction. Additionally a variety of bases can be used including ionic bases such as alkali metal hydroxides, alkoxides, carbonates, and sources of fluoride anion (e.g. TBAF) or nonionic organic amine bases including TMG, DBU, DBN, and PAP. The base and solvent used do not have a large influence on the overall outcome of the reaction.

== Limitations ==
One of the main drawbacks of the Henry reaction is the potential for side reactions throughout. Aside from the inherent reversibility of the reaction (or "retro–Henry") that can prevent the reaction from proceeding, the β-nitro alcohol also has the potential to undergo dehydration. For sterically hindered substrates, it is also possible for a base-catalyzed self-condensation (Cannizzaro reaction) to occur. A general scheme of the Cannizzaro reaction is depicted below.

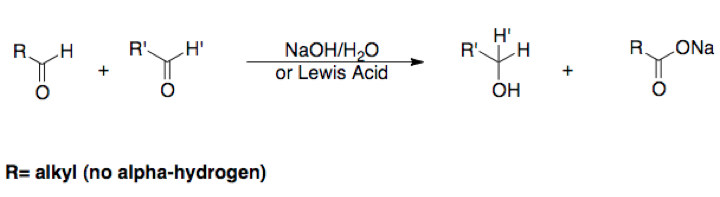
Cannizzaro Reaction Scheme

== Modifications ==
There have been a series of modifications made to the Henry reaction. Of these some of the most important include employing high-pressure and sometimes solvent free conditions to improve chemo- and regioselectivity and chiral metal catalysts to induce enantio-or diastereoselectivity. The aza-Henry reaction is also used to produce nitroamines and can be a reliable synthetic route for the synthesis of vicinal diamines.

Perhaps one of the most synthetically useful modifications to the Henry reaction is the use of an organocatalyst. The catalytic cycle is shown below.

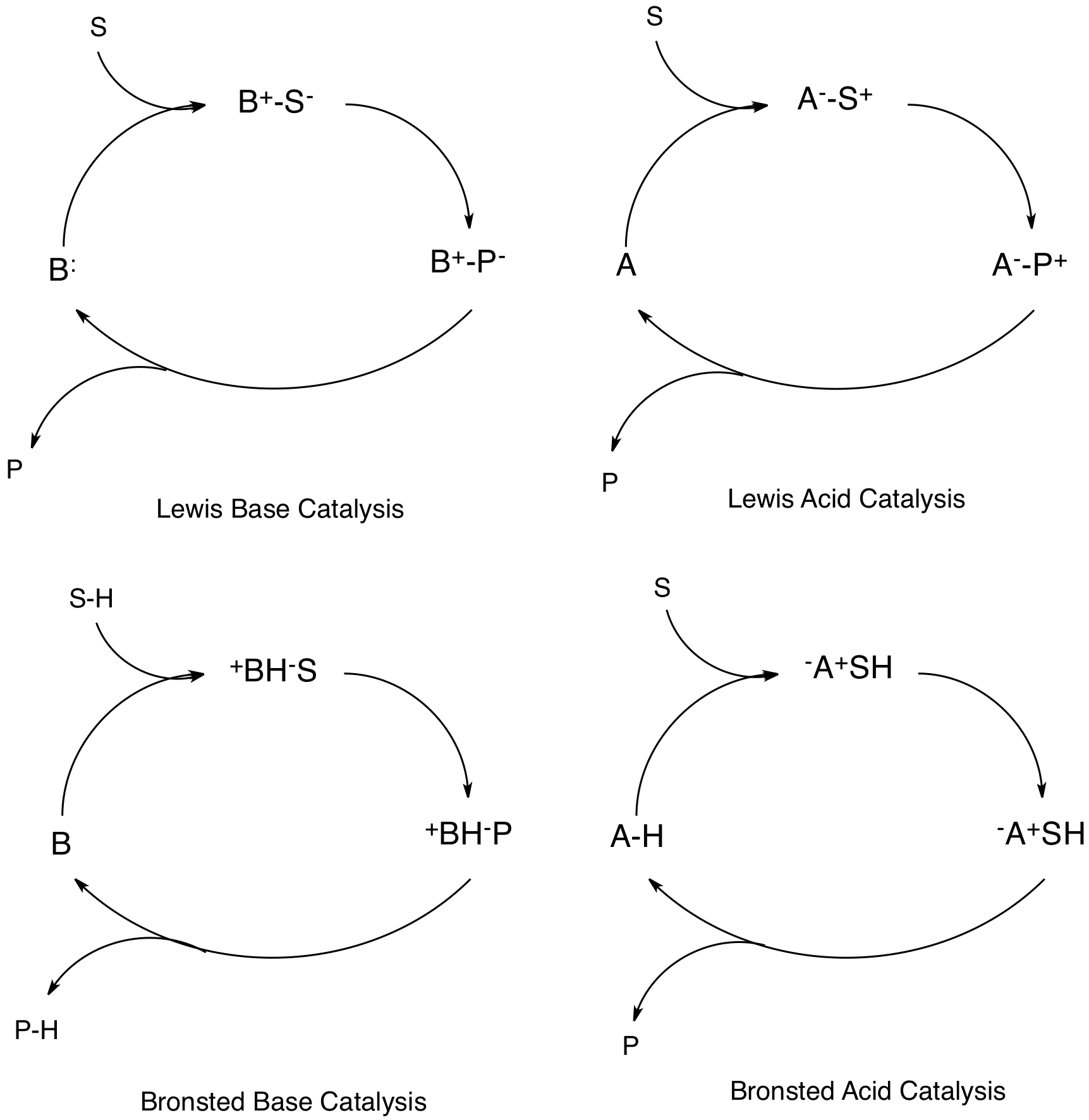
Henry reaction synthetic scheme

Benjamin List described that while this is a broad explanation, his brief review illustrates that this is a plausible mechanistic explanation for almost all reactions that involve an organocatalyst. An example of this type of reaction is illustrated in the Examples section of this article.

Other modifications include the conversion of unreactive alkyl nitro compounds to their corresponding dianions which will react faster with carbonyl substrates, reactions can be accelerated using PAP as the base, utilization of the reactivity of aldehydes with α,α-doubly deprotonated nitroalkanes to give nitronate alkoxides that yield syn-nitro alcohols, and generation of nitronate anions in which one oxygen atom on the nitro group is silyl-protected to yield anti-β-nitro alcohols in the presence of a fluoride anion source when reacted with an aldehyde.

== Examples ==
Industrial Application
In 1999, Menzel and coworkers developed a synthetic route to obtaining L-acosamine, the carbohydrate subunit of the anthracycline class of antibiotics:

Acosamine scheme

Industrial Application
An enantioselective aldol addition product can be obtained in asymmetric synthesis by reaction of benzaldehyde with nitromethane and the a catalyst system consisting of zinc triflate as a Lewis acid, diisopropylethylamine (DIPEA), and N-methylephedrine (NME) as and as a chiral ligand. A diastereoselective variation of this reaction is depicted below.

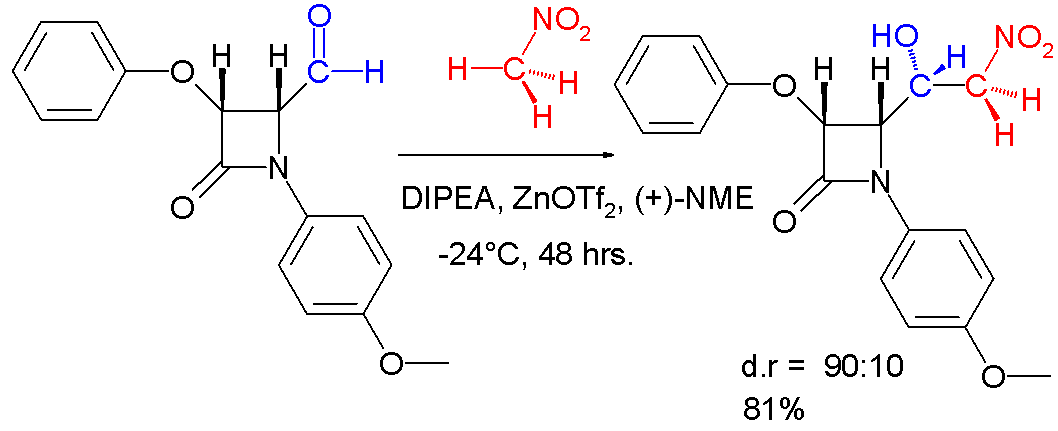
Henry reaction application

Total Synthesis
In 2005, Barua and coworkers completed the total synthesis of the potent aminopeptidase inhibitor, (–)-bestatin, in an overall yield of 26% overall yield employing Shibasaki's asymmetric Henry reaction as the key step. (illustrated below)

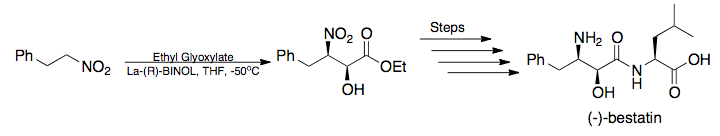
Bestatin

Organocatalysis
In 2006, Hiemstra and coworkers explored the use of quinine derivatives as asymmetric catalysts for the reaction between aromatic aldehydes and nitromethane. Through the use of particular derivatives, they were able to induce direct enantioselection through the use of the proper catalyst.

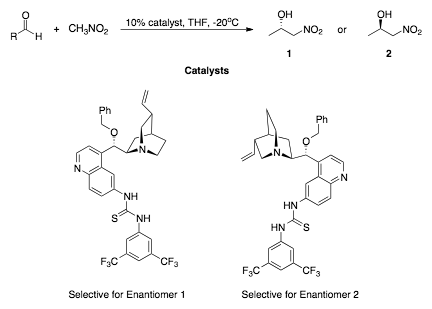
Chinchura

Biocatalysis
In 2006, Purkarthofer et al. found that (S)-hydroxynitrile lyase from Hevea brasiliensis catalyzes the formation of (S)-β-nitro alcohols. In 2011, Fuhshuku and Asano showed that the (R)-selective hydroxynitrile lyase from Arabidopsis thaliana could catalyze the synthesis of (R)-β-nitro alcohols from nitromethane and aromatic aldehydes.
