= 2-Nitropropane =

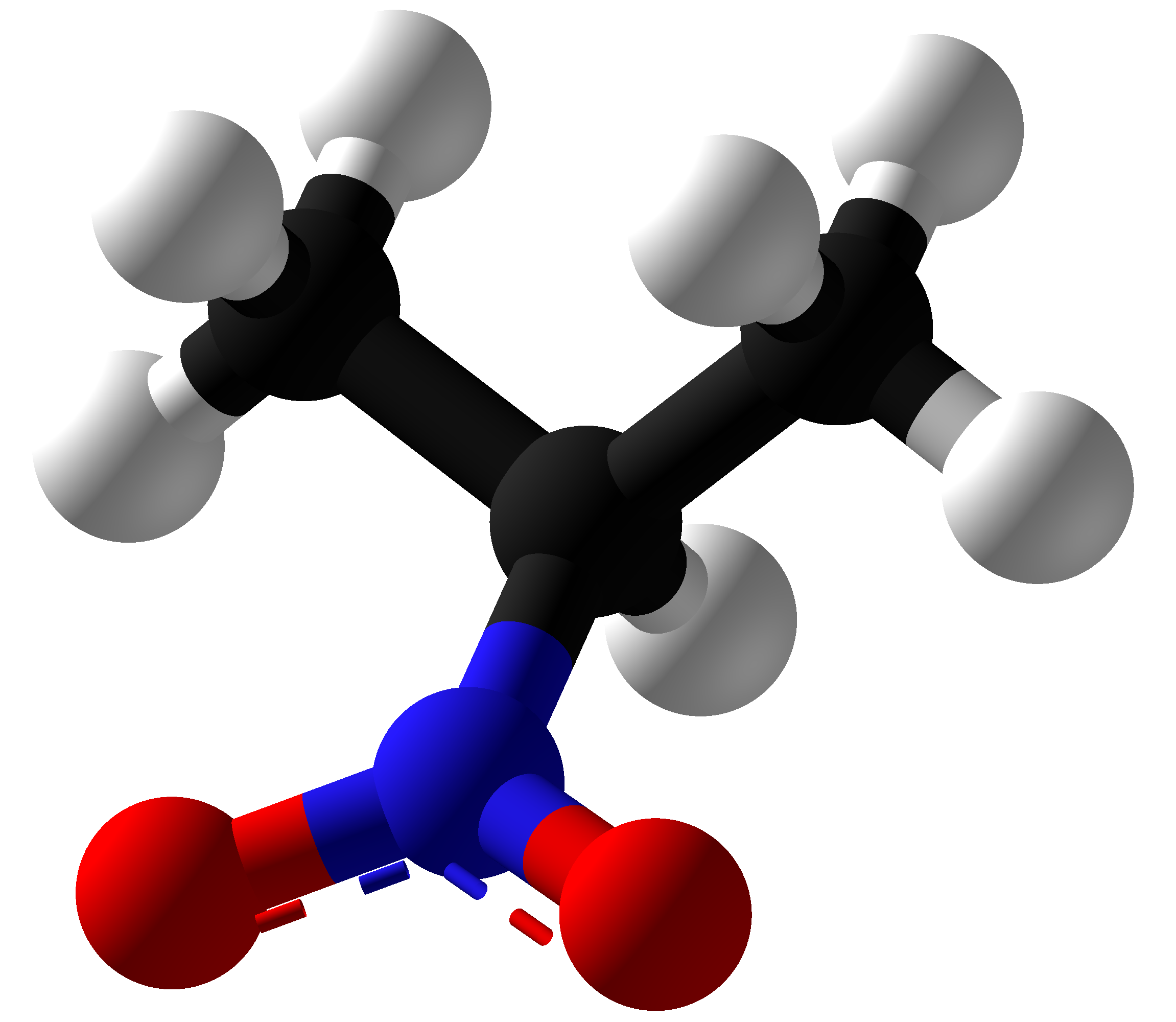

Names
- Preferred IUPAC name 2-Nitropropane

Identifiers
CAS Number	79-46-9
3D model (JSmol)	Interactive image
Abbreviations	2-NP; INP i-PrNO_{2} iPrNO_{2}^{i}PrNO_{2}
ChEBI	CHEBI:16037
ChemSpider	387
ECHA InfoCard	100.001.100
EC Number	201-209-1
PubChem CID	398
UNII	GKV234L2QH
CompTox Dashboard (EPA)	DTXSID6020981
- InChI: InChI=1S/C3H7NO2/c1-3(2)4(5)6/h3H,1-2H3 Key: FGLBSLMDCBOPQK-UHFFFAOYSA-N; InChI=1/C3H7NO2/c1-3(2)4(5)6/h3H,1-2H3 Key: FGLBSLMDCBOPQK-UHFFFAOYAM
- SMILES: CC(C)[N+](=O)[O-]

Properties
Chemical formula	C_{3}H_{7}NO_{2}
Molar mass	89.094 g·mol^{−1}
Appearance	Colorless liquid
Odor	Pleasant, fruity
Density	0.9821 g/cm^{3}
Melting point	−91.3 °C (−132.3 °F; 181.8 K)
Boiling point	120.2 °C (248.4 °F; 393.3 K)
Solubility in water	17 g/L
Solubility	soluble in chloroform
log P	0.93
Vapor pressure	13 mmHg (20°C)
Acidity (pK_{a})	16.9 (in DMSO)
Magnetic susceptibility (χ)	−45.73·10^{−6} cm^{3}/mol
Refractive index (n_{D})	1.3944 (20 °C)
Viscosity	0.721 cP

Hazards
- Occupational safety and health (OHS/OSH)
Main hazards	Health hazard
- GHS labelling
Pictograms	(GHS02: Flammable) (GHS07: Exclamation mark) (GHS08: Health hazard)
Hazard statements	H226, H302, H332, H350
Precautionary statements	P203, P210, P233, P240, P241, P242, P243, P261, P264, P270, P271, P280, P301+P317, P303+P361+P353, P304+P340, P317, P318, P330, P370+P378, P403+P235, P405, P501
NFPA 704 (fire diamond)	3 3 2 W
Flash point	24 °C (75 °F; 297 K) (open cup); 39 °C (closed cup)
Autoignition temperature	428 °C (802 °F; 701 K)
Explosive limits	2.6–11.0%
- Lethal dose or concentration (LD, LC)
LD_{50} (median dose)	720 mg/kg
LC_{50} (median concentration)	2703 ppm (mouse, 2 hr); 400 ppm (rat, 6 hr)
LC_{Lo} (lowest published)	714 ppm (cat, 5 hr); 2381 ppm (rabbit, 5 hr); 4622 ppm (guinea pig, 5 hr); 2353 ppm (cat, 1 hr)
- NIOSH (US health exposure limits)
PEL (Permissible)	TWA 25 ppm (90 mg/m^{3})
REL (Recommended)	Ca
IDLH (Immediate danger)	Ca [100 ppm]
- Except where otherwise noted, data are given for materials in their standard state (at 25 °C [77 °F], 100 kPa). Infobox references

2-Nitropropane (2-NP) is an organic compound with the formula (CH_{3})_{2}CH(NO_{2}). It is used as a solvent. It is a colorless liquid and is classified as a nitro compound.

== Preparation ==
2-Nitropropane is produced by the high-temperature vapor-phase nitration of propane, usually with impurities of 1-nitropropane. 2-Nitropropane is also produced as a volatile by-product that can be captured during Leonard's ring-closure hydantoin preparation.

== Uses ==
2-Nitropropane is used as a solvent or additive in inks, paints, adhesives, varnishes, polymers, resins, fuel, and coatings. It is also used as a feedstock for other industrial chemicals, and also in the synthesis of pharmaceuticals such as phentermine, chlorphentermine, and teclozan. It serves as an oxidant in the Hass–Bender oxidation process.

== Safety ==
2-Nitropropane is a constituent of tobacco smoke. Based on studies in animals, it is reasonably anticipated to be a human carcinogen and it is listed as an IARC Group 2B carcinogen.
