= C7H5NO3 =

The molecular formula C_{7}H_{5}NO_{3} (molar mass: 151.12 g/mol, exact mass: 151.0269 u) may refer to:

- 2-Nitrobenzaldehyde
- 3-Nitrobenzaldehyde
- 4-Nitrobenzaldehyde
