= Indoxyl-UDPG glucosyltransferase =

Class of enzymes

Identifiers
- EC no.: 2.4.1.220
- CAS no.: 258339-72-9

Databases
- IntEnz: IntEnz view
- BRENDA: BRENDA entry
- ExPASy: NiceZyme view
- KEGG: KEGG entry
- MetaCyc: metabolic pathway
- PRIAM: profile
- PDB structures: RCSB PDB PDBe PDBsum
- Gene Ontology: AmiGO / QuickGO
Search
- PMC: articles
- PubMed: articles
- NCBI: proteins

Indoxyl-UDPG glucosyltransferase (EC 2.4.1.220) is an enzyme that catalyzes the chemical reaction

indoxyl
+ UDP-glucose
UDP
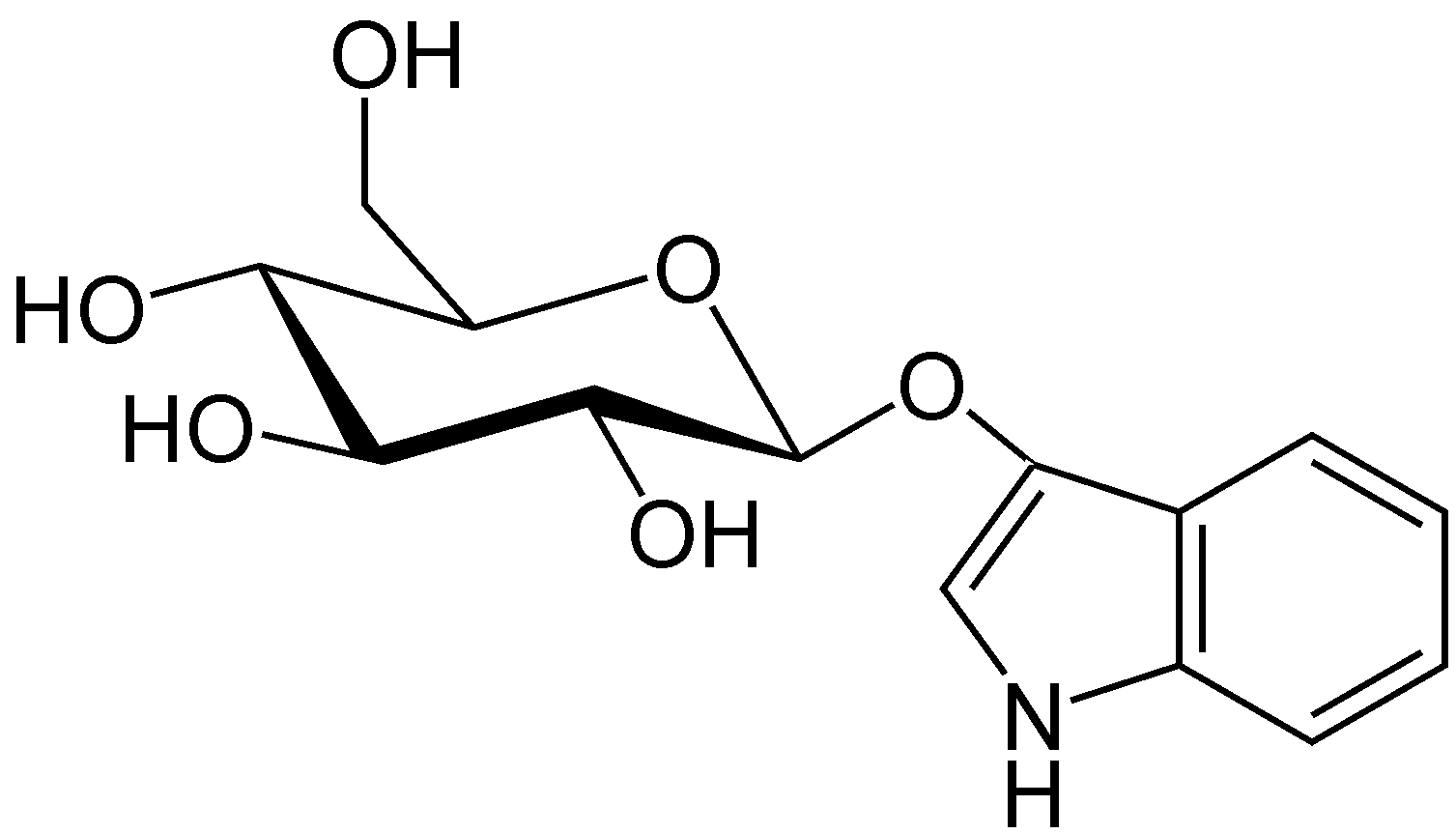
indican

The two substrates of this enzyme characterised from Baphicacanthus cusia are indoxyl and UDP-glucose. Its products are indican and uridine diphosphate (UDP).

This enzyme belongs to the family of glycosyltransferases, specifically the hexosyltransferases. The systematic name of this enzyme class is UDP-glucose:indoxyl 3-O-beta-D-glucosyltransferase. This enzyme is also called indoxyl-UDPG-glucosyltransferase.
