= TAT1 =

TAT1 may refer to:

- TAT-1, first submarine transatlantic telephone cable system
- TAT1 (gene), human gene
