= 2-Nitrocinnamaldehyde =

Names
- Preferred IUPAC name (2E)-3-(2-Nitrophenyl)prop-2-enal

Identifiers
| CAS Number | 1466-88-2; 66894-06-2 (E) |
| 3D model (JSmol) | Interactive image |
| ChEMBL | ChEMBL53723 |
| ChemSpider | 4518729 |
| EC Number | 215-988-0 |
| PubChem CID | 5367122 |
| UNII | 72Y4RH8QTA |
- InChI: InChI=1S/C9H7NO3/c11-7-3-5-8-4-1-2-6-9(8)10(12)13/h1-7H/b5-3+ Key: VMSMELHEXDVEDE-HWKANZROSA-N; InChI=1/C9H7NO3/c11-7-3-5-8-4-1-2-6-9(8)10(12)13/h1-7H/b5-3+ Key: VMSMELHEXDVEDE-HWKANZROBN
- SMILES: O=[N+]([O-])c1ccccc1\C=C\C=O

Properties
| Chemical formula | C_{9}H_{7}O_{3}N |
| Appearance | Pale yellow crystalline powder |
| Melting point | 124 to 126 °C (255 to 259 °F; 397 to 399 K) |
| Solubility in water | Slightly soluble |

Hazards
- GHS labelling
| Pictograms | (GHS07: Exclamation mark) |
| Signal word | Warning |
| Hazard statements | H315, H319, H335 |
| Precautionary statements | P261, P264, P271, P280, P302+P352, P304+P340, P305+P351+P338, P312, P321, P332+P313, P337+P313, P362, P403+P233, P405, P501 |
- Except where otherwise noted, data are given for materials in their standard state (at 25 °C [77 °F], 100 kPa). verify (what is ?) Infobox references

2-Nitrocinnamaldehyde, ortho-nitrocinnamaldehyde or o-nitrocinnamaldehyde is an organic aromatic compound containing a nitro group ortho- to the 1-position of cinnamaldehyde.

== Synthesis ==
2-Nitrocinnamaldehyde can be synthesized by dissolving cinnamaldehyde to a solution of acetic anhydride in acetic acid, and adding a stoichiometric amount of concentrated nitric acid at 0–5 °C. Yields are around 36-46% of theoretical.

Nitration of cinnamaldehyde via acidification of a nitrate salt with H_{2}SO_{4} also yields the ortho-nitro compound, however it also yields some of the para-nitro compound, which is generally undesired.

2-Nitrocinnamaldehyde can also be prepared by reacting 2-nitrobenzaldehyde with acetaldehyde in a condensation reaction.

== Uses ==
2-Nitrocinnamaldehyde can be oxidized to 2-nitrocinnamic acid which can be used in the Baeyer-Emmerling indole synthesis to produce indole and substituted indoles.
