= Nitrobenzaldehyde =

Nitrobenzaldehyde may refer to any of the three isomeric chemical compounds:

- 2-Nitrobenzaldehyde
- 3-Nitrobenzaldehyde
- 4-Nitrobenzaldehyde
isomers of nitrobenzaldehyde

2-nitrobenzaldehyde (o-nitrobenzaldehyde)

3-nitrobenzaldehyde (m-nitrobenzaldehyde)

4-nitrobenzaldehyde (p-nitrobenzaldehyde)
