= Blue diaper syndrome =

- Other names: Drummond’s syndrome, Hypercalcemia, familial, with nephrocalcinosis and indicanuria
- Blue diaper syndrome may have an autosomal recessive pattern of inheritance.
- Blue diaper syndrome may have an X-linked recessive pattern of inheritance.
- Medication: none

Blue diaper syndrome is a rare, autosomal recessive or X-linked recessive metabolic disorder characterized in infants by bluish urine-stained diapers. It is also known as Drummond's syndrome.

The syndrome is caused by a defect in tryptophan absorption. Bacterial degradation of unabsorbed tryptophan in the intestine leads to excessive indole production and thus to indicanuria which, on oxidation to indigo blue, causes a peculiar bluish discoloration of the diaper (indoluria). Symptoms typically include digestive disturbances, fever and visual problems. Some may also develop disease due to the incomplete breakdown of tryptophan.

It was characterized in 1964, and inherited in an autosomal recessive pattern although X-linked recessive inheritance has not been completely ruled out since reported patients have been male.

If this syndrome is X-linked, the chance for a child to receive normal genes from both parents and be genetically normal for that particular trait is 25%. If an individual receives one normal gene and one gene for the disease, the person will be a carrier for the disease, but usually will not show symptoms. Carrier females usually do not display symptoms of the disorder because it is usually the X chromosome with the abnormal gene that is "turned off".

Parents can undergo genetic testing to see if their child will inherit the condition, but most do not find out until they see the symptoms mentioned below.

== Signs and symptoms ==
The signs and symptoms of blue diaper syndrome may include irritability, constipation, poor appetite, vomiting, and poor growth. Some children experience frequent fevers and intestinal infections.

Hypercalcemia is a potential issue in affected children. Some children with blue diaper syndrome have eye or vision issues, particularly underdeveloped portions of the eye, including the cornea and optic disc.

== Genetics ==
Blue diaper syndrome affects males and females equally. The number of people affected in the general population is unknown.

Although the disease is most likely recessive, it could be X-linked.

Recent research indicates that mutations in the LAT2 and TAT1 genes might be involved in causing this syndrome.

It is linked to X linked gene and in order for a person to develop it, both parents must carry the gene. This syndrome is diagnosed through clinical evaluation and a fresh urine sample

== Diagnosis ==
A diagnosis is usually made through clinical evaluation, observing detailed patient history then identifying the possible characteristic symptoms and testing fresh urine samples to enhance such evidence.

== Treatment ==
Children with blue diaper syndrome are put on restricted diets. This is in effort to reduce kidney damage. Restrictions include: calcium, protein, vitamin D, and tryptophan. Calcium is restricted to help prevent kidney damage. Examples of food with high levels of tryptophan include turkey and milk. Diets are also expected to be low in protein, which will help prevent symptoms, along with restricting vitamin D intake. Antibiotics may be used to control or eliminate particular intestinal bacteria.

Genetic counseling can also be beneficial, as well as taking part in clinical trials.
