= Adolph Emmerling =

German chemist (1842–1906)

Adolph Emmerling (13 June 1842, Freiburg im Breisgau – 17 March 1906, Baden-Baden) was a German chemist, known for his research in the field of agricultural chemistry.

He studied chemistry at the University of Freiburg, receiving his doctorate in 1865. Following graduation, he spent several years as a laboratory assistant in Freiburg and Heidelberg. In 1870 he became director of the Landwirtschaftlichen Versuchsstation Kiel (Agricultural Experimental Station in Kiel), a post he maintained until his death. In 1874 he obtained his habilitation at the University of Kiel, and in 1882, received the title of professor.

In 1869, with Adolf von Baeyer, he discovered a method for synthesizing indole by fusing ortho-nitrocinnamic acid with potash and iron filings ("Baeyer–Emmerling indole synthesis").

== Published works ==
- Agrikultur-Chemische Untersuchungen: Versuche und Analysen, 1895 – Agricultural-chemical investigations: Testing and analysis.
- Studien über die Eiweissbildung in der Pflanze, 1900 – Studies on protein formation in plants.
- Beiträge zur kenntnis der dauerweiden in den marschen Norddeutschlands, 1901 – Contributions to the knowledge of permanent pasture in the marshes of Northern Germany (with Carl Albert Weber).

Many of his scientific articles were published in the periodicals, Die Landwirtschaftlichen Versuchs-Stationen and the Berichte der deutschen chemischen Gesellschaft.
