= Baeyer–Emmerling indole synthesis =

Syntheses in organic chemistry

Named after	Adolf von Baeyer; Adolph Emmerling
Reaction type	Ring forming reaction

Baeyer–Emmerling indole synthesis is a method for synthesizing indole from a (substituted) ortho-nitrocinnamic acid and iron powder in strongly basic solution. This reaction was discovered by Adolf von Baeyer and Adolph Emmerling in 1869.

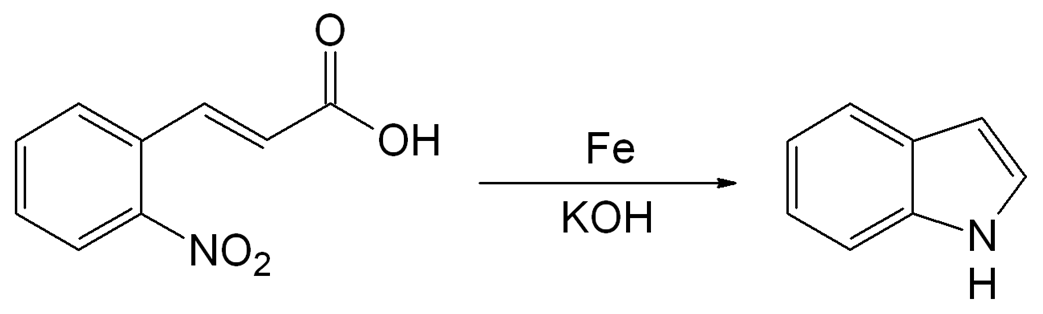
Baeyer-Emmerling indole synthesis

== Reaction mechanism ==
The reaction of iron powder with o-nitrocinnamic acid reduces the nitro group to a nitroso. The nitrogen then condenses with a carbon on the alkene chain with loss of a molecule of water to form a ring. Decarboxylation gives indole.

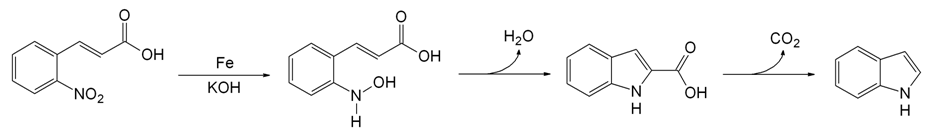
Baeyer-Emmerling indole reaction mechanism

== See also ==
- Baeyer–Drewsen indigo synthesis
