= Indigo dye =

Chemical compound, food additive and dye

Indigo
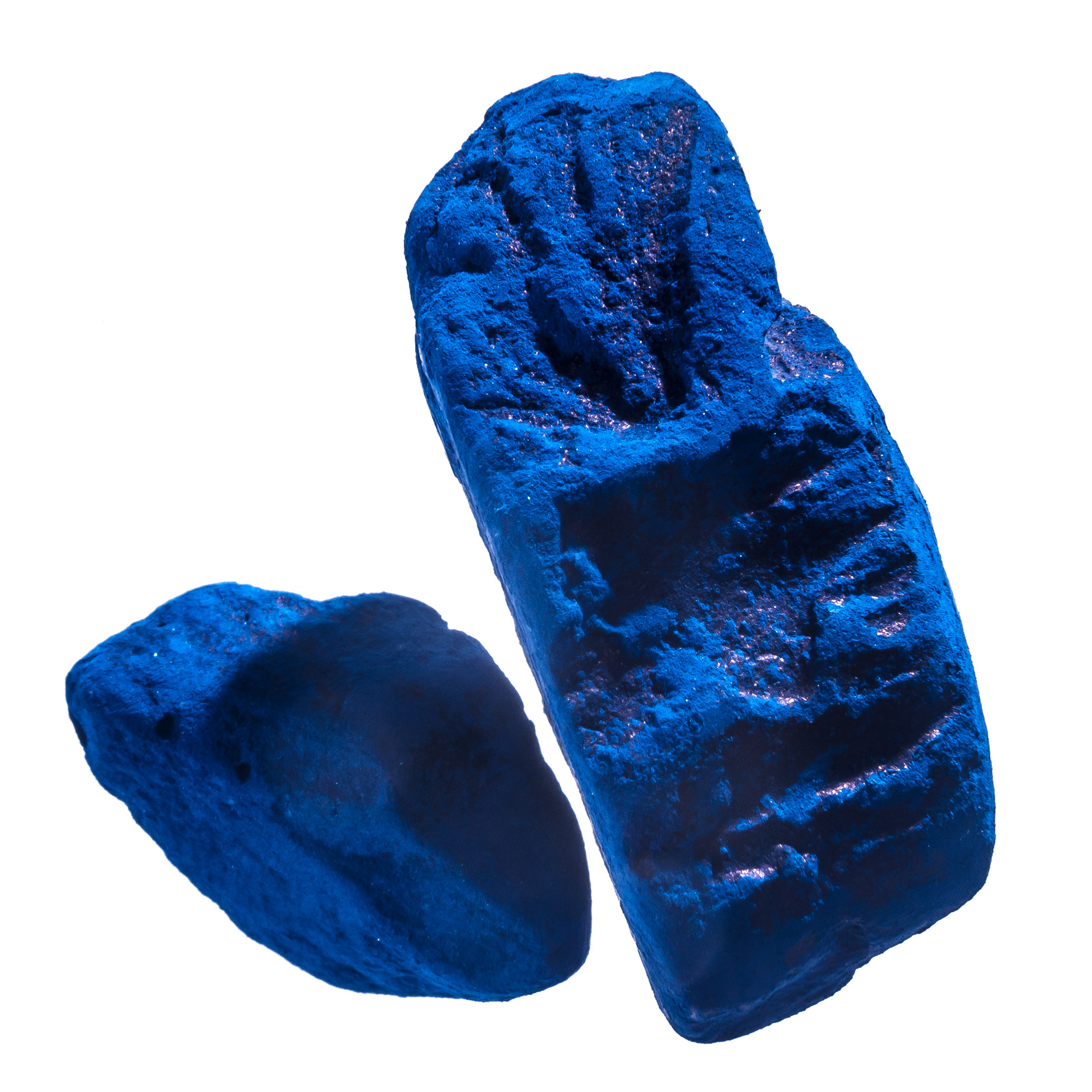
- Cake of indigo, c. 2 centimetres (1 in)

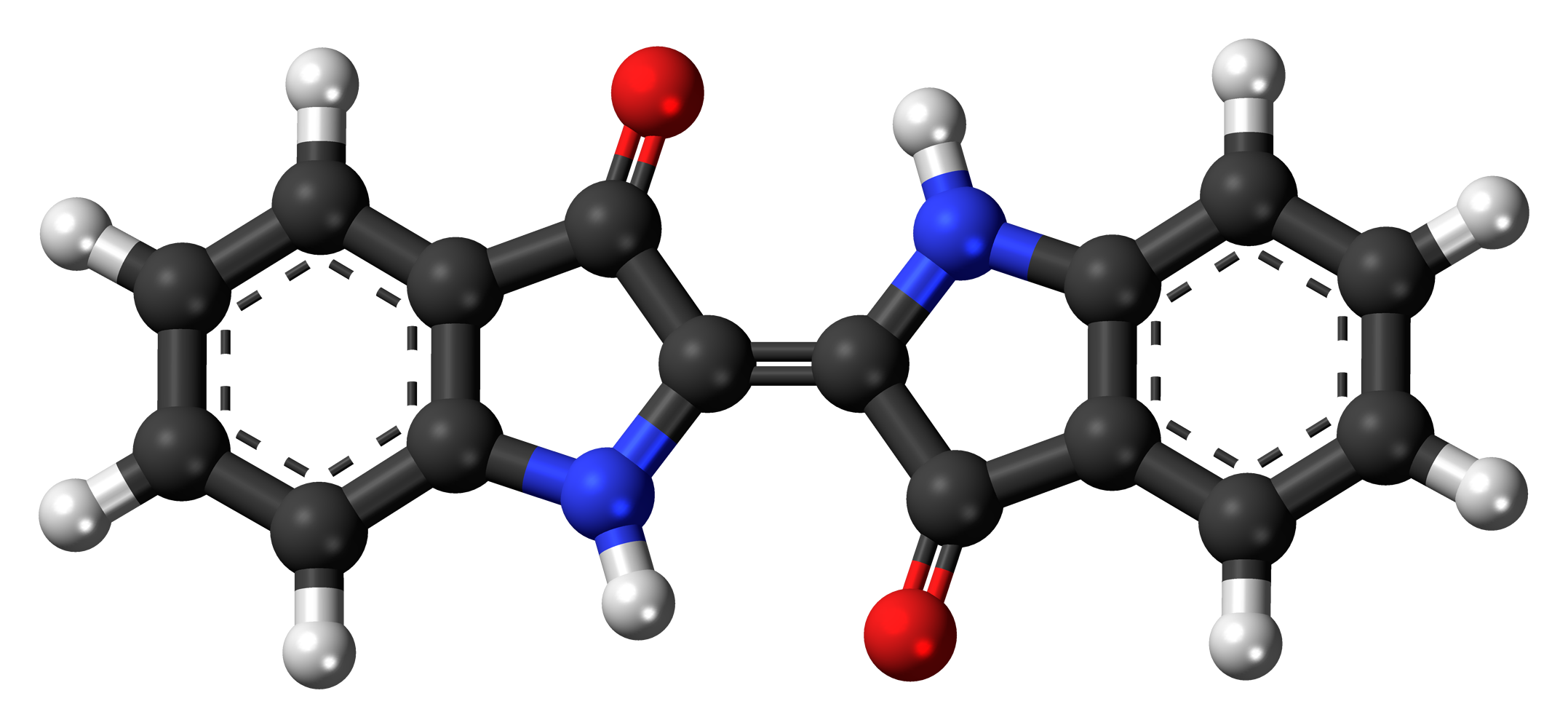

Names
- Preferred IUPAC name [2(2')E]-[2,2'-Biindolylidene]-3,3'(1H,1'H)-dione
- Other names 2,2'-Bis(2,3-dihydro-3-oxoindolyliden), Indigotin

Identifiers
CAS Number	64784-13-0
3D model (JSmol)	Interactive image
ChEMBL	ChEMBL599552
ChemSpider	4477009
ECHA InfoCard	100.006.898
PubChem CID	10215
RTECS number	DU2988400
UNII	1G5BK41P4F
CompTox Dashboard (EPA)	DTXSID3026279
- InChI: InChI=1S/C16H10N2O2/c19-15-9-5-1-3-7-11(9)17-13(15)14-16(20)10-6-2-4-8-12(10)18-14/h1-8,17-18H/b14-13+ Key: COHYTHOBJLSHDF-BUHFOSPRSA-N; InChI=1/C16H10N2O2/c19-15-9-5-1-3-7-11(9)17-13(15)14-16(20)10-6-2-4-8-12(10)18-14/h1-8,17-18H/b14-13+ Key: COHYTHOBJLSHDF-BUHFOSPRBQ
- SMILES: c1ccc2c(c1)C(=O)/C(=C\3/C(=O)c4ccccc4N3)/N2

Properties
Chemical formula	C_{16}H_{10}N_{2}O_{2}
Molar mass	262.27 g/mol
Appearance	dark blue crystalline powder
Density	1.199 g/cm^{3}
Melting point	390 to 392 °C (734 to 738 °F; 663 to 665 K)
Boiling point	decomposes
Solubility in water	990 µg/L (at 25 °C)

Related compounds
Related compounds	Indoxyl; Tyrian purple Indican
- Except where otherwise noted, data are given for materials in their standard state (at 25 °C [77 °F], 100 kPa). verify (what is ?) Infobox references

Indigo dye is an organic compound with a distinctive blue color. Indigo is a natural dye obtained from the leaves of some plants of the Indigofera genus, in particular Indigofera tinctoria. Dye-bearing Indigofera plants were once common throughout the world. Blue colorants are relatively rare. Since indigo is insoluble, it is also referred to as a pigment (C.I. Pigment Blue 66, C.I.).

Most indigo dye produced today is synthetic, constituting around 80,000 tonnes each year, as of 2023. It is most commonly associated with the production of denim cloth and blue jeans, where its properties allow for effects such as stone washing and acid washing to be applied quickly.

== Uses ==
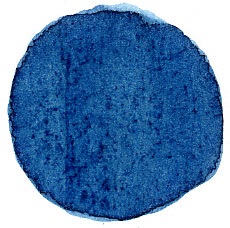
Indigo dye

The primary use for indigo is as a dye for cotton yarn, mainly used in the production of denim cloth suitable for blue jeans; on average, a pair of blue jeans requires 3–12 grams (0.11–0.42 oz) of dye. Smaller quantities are used in the dyeing of wool and silk.

Indigo's widespread use was partly due to its colorfast properties, as it binds effectively to fibers while allowing repeated dyeing processes that produce a range of shades.

Indigo carmine, also known as indigo, is an indigo derivative which is also used as a colorant. About 20,000 tonnes are produced annually, again mainly for the production of blue jeans.

Indigo is also used to dye the skin in Egypt, Kurdistan, and West Africa.

== Sources ==
=== Natural sources ===
A variety of plants have provided indigo throughout history, but most natural indigo was obtained from those in the genus Indigofera, which are native to the tropics, notably the Indian Subcontinent. The primary commercial indigo species in Asia was true indigo (Indigofera tinctoria, also known as I. sumatrana). A common alternative used in the relatively colder subtropical locations such as Japan's Ryukyu Islands and Taiwan is Strobilanthes cusia.

Until the introduction of Indigofera species from the south, Persicaria tinctoria (dyer's knotweed) was the most important blue dyestuff in East Asia; however, the crop produced less dyestuff than the average crop of indigo, and was quickly surpassed in favour of the more economical Indigofera tinctoria plant. In Central and South America, the species grown is Indigofera suffruticosa, also known as anil, and in India, an important species was Indigofera arrecta, Natal indigo. In Europe, Isatis tinctoria, commonly known as woad, was used for dyeing fabrics blue, containing the same dyeing compounds as indigo, also referred to as indigo.

Several plants contain indigo, which, when exposed to an oxidizing source such as atmospheric oxygen, reacts to produce indigo dye; however, the relatively low concentrations of indigo in these plants make them difficult to work with, with the color more easily tainted by other dye substances also present in these plants, typically leading to a greenish tinge.

The precursor to indigo is indican, a colorless, water-soluble derivative of the amino acid tryptophan, and Indigofera leaves contain as much as 0.2–0.8% of this compound. Pressing cut leaves into a vat and soaking hydrolyzes the indican, releasing β-D-glucose and indoxyl. The indoxyl dimerizes in the mixture, and after 12–15 hours of fermentation yields the yellow, water-soluble leucoindigo. Subsequent exposure to air forms the blue, water-insoluble indigo dye. The dye precipitates from the fermented leaf solution upon oxidation, but may also be precipitated when mixed with a strong base such as lye. The solids are filtered, pressed into cakes, dried, and powdered. The powder is then mixed with various other substances to produce different shades of blue and purple.

Natural sources of indigo also include mollusks: the Murex genus of sea snails produces a mixture of indigo and 6,6'-dibromoindigo (red), which together produce a range of purple hues known as Tyrian purple. Light exposure during part of the dyeing process can convert the dibromoindigo into indigo, resulting in blue hues known as royal blue, hyacinth purple, or tekhelet.

=== Chemical synthesis ===
Heumann's synthesis of indigo

Pfleger's synthesis of indigo

Given its economic importance, indigo has been prepared by many methods. The Baeyer–Drewsen indigo synthesis dates back to 1882. It involves an aldol condensation of o-nitrobenzaldehyde with acetone, followed by cyclization and oxidative dimerization to indigo. This route was highly useful for obtaining indigo and many of its derivatives on the laboratory scale, but proved impractical for industrial-scale synthesis. Johannes Pfleger and Karl Heumann eventually came up with industrial mass production synthesis from aniline by using mercury as a catalyst. The method was discovered by an accident by Karl Heumann in Zurich which involved a broken thermometer.

The first commercially practical route of producing indigo is credited to Pfleger in 1901. In this process, N-phenylglycine is treated with a molten mixture of sodium hydroxide, potassium hydroxide, and sodamide. This highly sensitive melt produces indoxyl, which is subsequently oxidized in air to form indigo. Variations of this method are still in use today. An alternative and also viable route to indigo is credited to Heumann in 1897. It involves heating N-(2-carboxyphenyl)glycine to 200 °C (392 °F) in an inert atmosphere with sodium hydroxide. The process is easier than the Pfleger method, but the precursors are more expensive. Indoxyl-2-carboxylic acid is generated. This material readily decarboxylates to give indoxyl, which oxidizes in air to form indigo. The preparation of indigo dye is practised in college laboratory classes according to the original Baeyer–Drewsen route.

== History ==
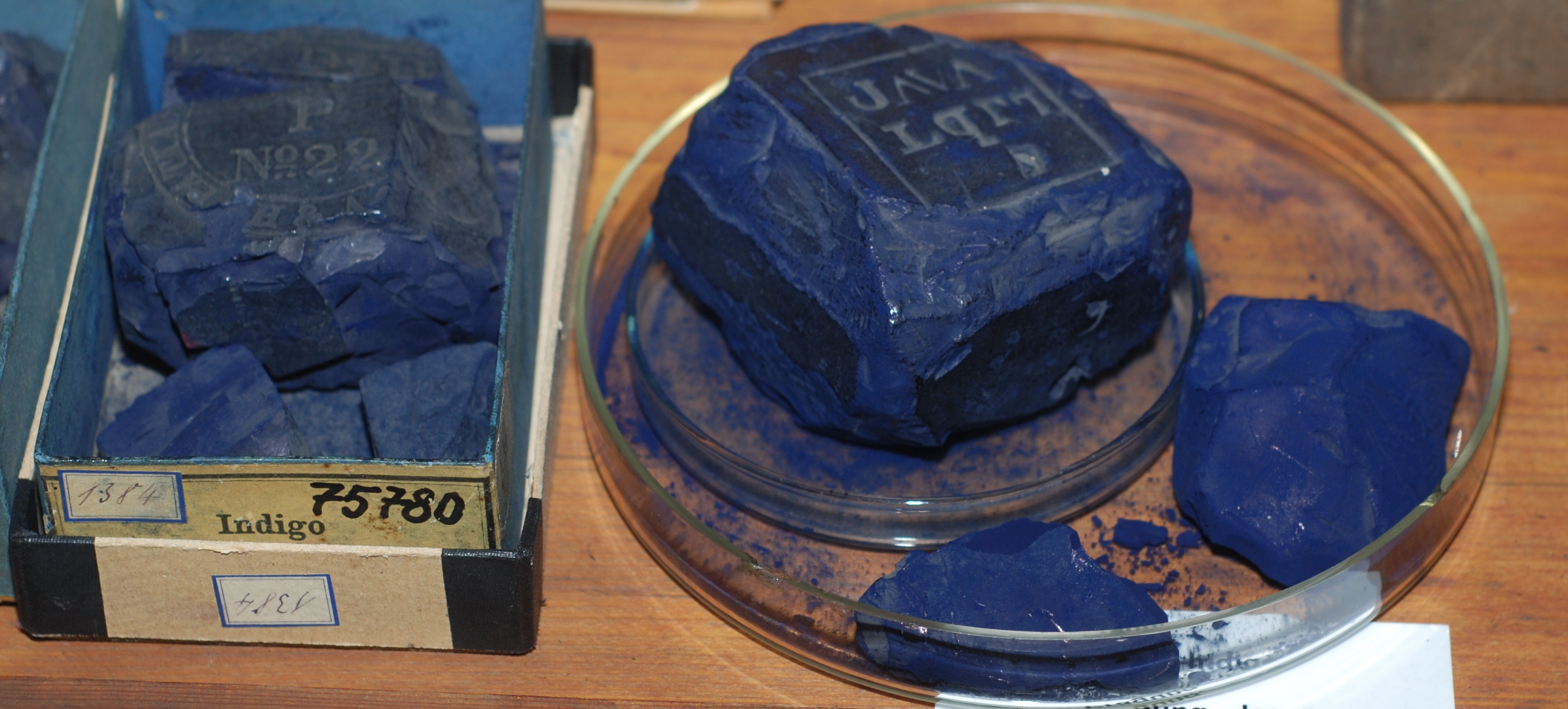
Indigo, historical dye collection of the Technical University of Dresden, Germany

The oldest known fabric dyed indigo, dated to 6,000 years ago, was discovered in Huaca Prieta, Peru. Many Asian countries, such as India, China, Japan, and Southeast Asian nations have used indigo as a dye (particularly for silk) for centuries. The dye was also known to ancient civilizations in Mesopotamia, Egypt, Britain, Mesoamerica, Peru, Iran, and West Africa. Indigo was also cultivated in India, which was also the earliest major center for its production and processing. The Indigofera tinctoria species was domesticated in India. Indigo, used as a dye, made its way to the Greeks and the Romans, where it was valued as a luxury product.

In Mesopotamia, a neo-Babylonian cuneiform tablet of the seventh century BC gives a recipe for the dyeing of wool, where lapis-colored wool (uqnatu) is produced by repeated immersion and airing of the cloth. Indigo was most probably imported from India. The Romans used indigo as a pigment for painting and for medicinal and cosmetic purposes. It was a luxury item imported to the Mediterranean from India by Arab merchants.

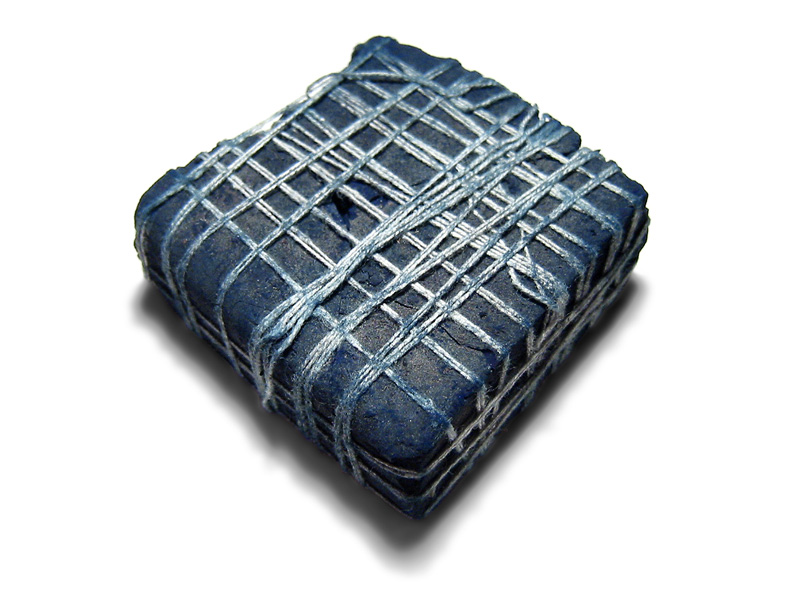
Piece of indigo plant dye from India, c. 2 1/2 centimetres (1 in) square.

India was a primary supplier of indigo to Europe as early as the Greco-Roman era. The association of India with indigo is reflected in the Greek word for the dye, indikón (Ἰνδικόν, Indian). The Romans Latinized the term to indicum, which passed into Italian dialect and eventually into English as the word indigo.

In Bengal, indigo cultivators revolted against exploitative working conditions created by European merchants and planters in what became known as the Indigo revolt in 1859. The Bengali play Nil Darpan by Indian playwright Dinabandhu Mitra was a fictionalized retelling of the revolt.

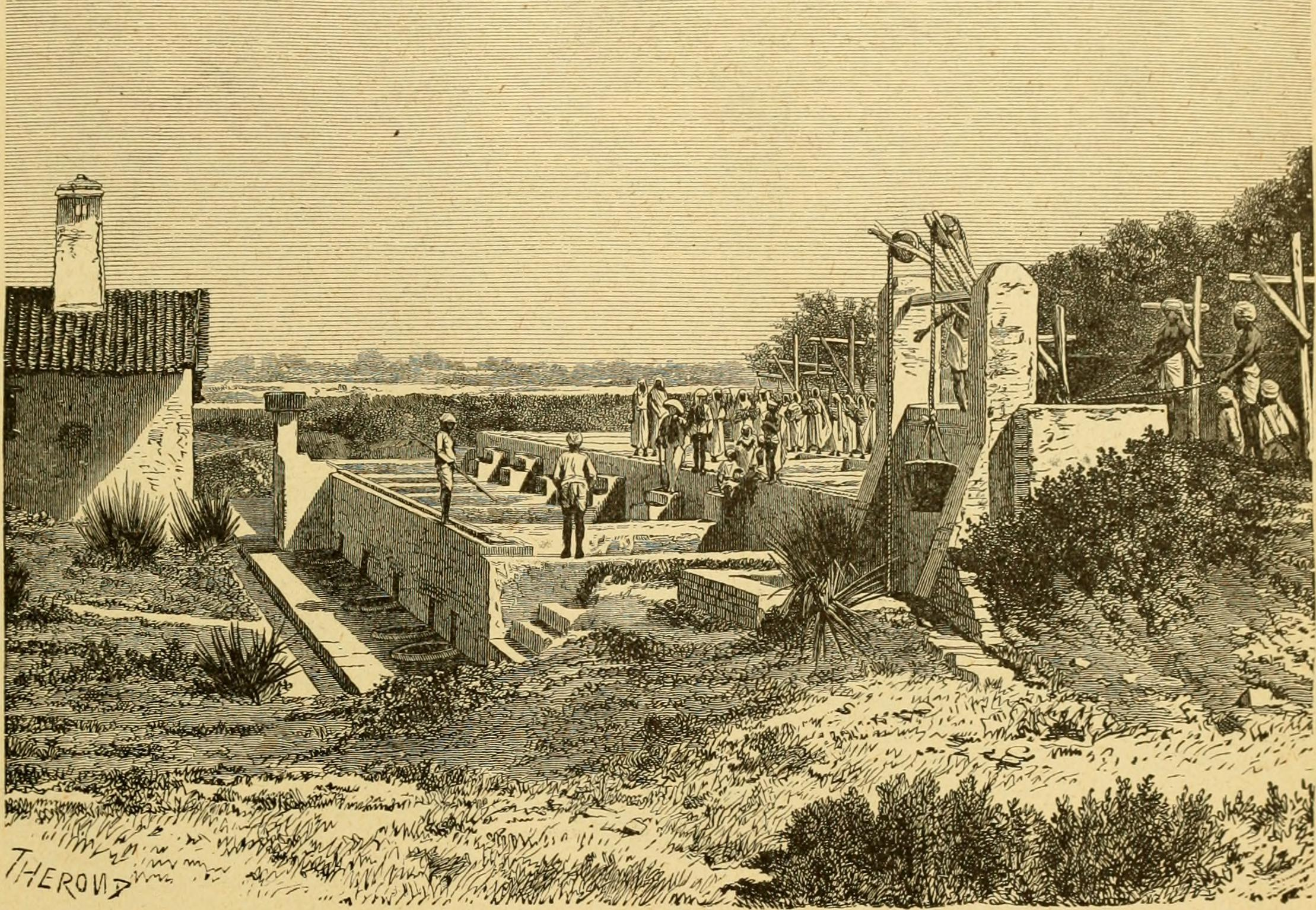
Indigo factory at Allahabad, India, drawn by Émile Thérond, 19th century

The demand for indigo in the 19th century is indicated by the fact that in 1897, 7,000 km^{2} (2,700 sq mi) were dedicated to the cultivation of indican-producing plants, mainly in India. By comparison, the country of Luxembourg is 2,586 km^{2} (998 sq mi).

In Europe, indigo remained a rare commodity throughout the Middle Ages. A chemically identical dye derived from the woad plant (Isatis tinctoria) was used instead. In the late 15th century, the Portuguese explorer Vasco da Gama discovered a sea route to India. This led to the establishment of direct trade with India, the Spice Islands, China, and Japan. Importers could now avoid the heavy duties imposed by Persian, Levantine, and Greek middlemen and the lengthy and dangerous land routes which had previously been used. Consequently, the importation and use of indigo in Europe rose significantly. Much European indigo from Asia arrived through ports in Portugal, the Netherlands, and England. Many indigo plantations were established by European powers in tropical climates. Spain imported the dye from its colonies in Central and South America, and it was a major crop in Haiti and Jamaica, with much or all of the labor performed by enslaved Africans and African Americans. Indigo plantations also thrived in the Virgin Islands. However, France and Germany outlawed imported indigo in the 16th century to protect the local woad dye industry. In central Europe, indigo resist dyeing is a centuries-old skill that has received UNESCO Intangible Cultural Heritage of Humanity recognition.

Newton used "indigo" to describe one of the two new primary colors he added to the five he had originally named, in his revised account of the rainbow in Lectiones Opticae of 1675.

Because of its high value as a trading commodity, indigo was often referred to as blue gold.

In the early days of Islam, Christians were expected to wear a blue turban or mantle to identify them. In Egypt, which was majority Christian and remained so for generations, this created a high demand for blue dye, particularly indigo. Even though regulation of the distinguishing dress relaxed from the 10-16th centuries, indigo remained a significant part of the Egyptian economy. It lost its Christian connotations and became the color of the people's dress, because it was plentiful and cheap. It remained so until the 19th century. The British taxed farmers who grew indigo to encourage people to grow cotton, and restricted water use in favor of cotton. This also affected flax, which had been a popular local fiber for indigo dyers. This, paired with the import of cheap black cotton fabrics from Britain, caused blue to fall out of favor in Egyptian women's dress in the early 20th century. Egyptian men continued to wear indigo for some time, but the total preference for the dye waned as well. Blue was also a mourning color, and mourning women would dye their faces, arms, and hands blue for the week after the death and periodic grave visitations. Blue cloths were worn and waved around at these times as well to accompany the women's wailing.

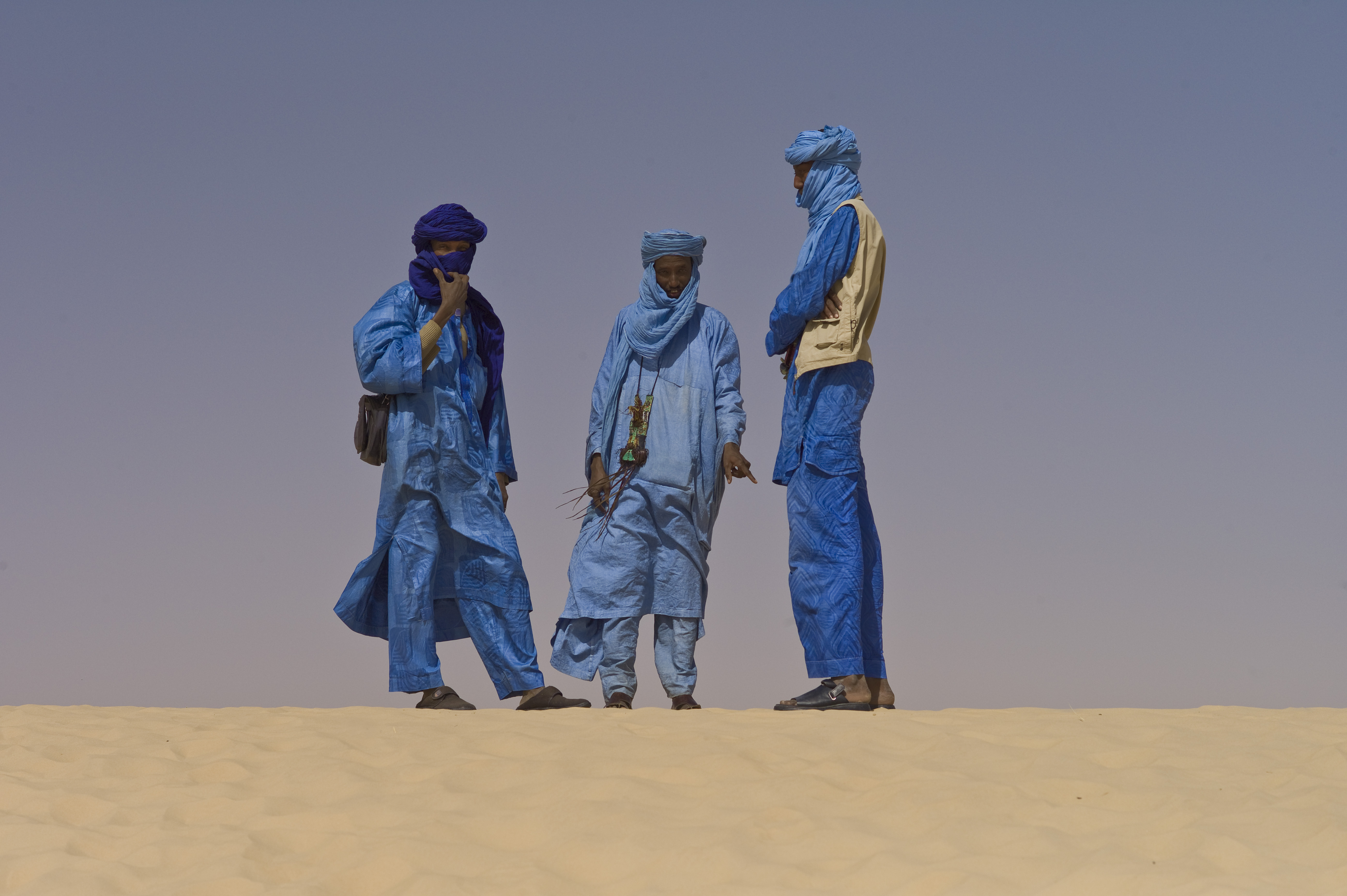
Tuaregs wearing the indigo-dyed tagelmust

Throughout West Africa, indigo was the foundation of centuries-old textile traditions. From the Tuareg nomads of the Sahara to Cameroon, clothes dyed with indigo signified wealth. Women dyed the cloth in most areas, with the Yoruba of Nigeria and the Mandinka of Mali particularly well known for their expertise. Among the Hausa male dyers, working at communal dye pits was the basis of the wealth of the ancient city of Kano, and they can still be seen plying their trade today at the same pits. The Tuareg are sometimes called the "Blue People" because the indigo pigment in the cloth of their traditional robes and turbans stained their skin dark blue.

Palestine and Iran also historically produced large amounts of indigo. In Palestine, it was a major industry since at least the 17th century. It was used to dye southern women's dresses, coats in Galilee, pants all over, and men's cloaks. A similar blue-to-black shift occurred due to British colonialism, though blue is still seen on traditional Palestinian dresses with some frequency in synthetic form. Widows would dye their dresses with indigo to cover the other colors, and wear blue veils and belts. Blue was also associated with unmarried girls, whose dresses were embroidered with it.

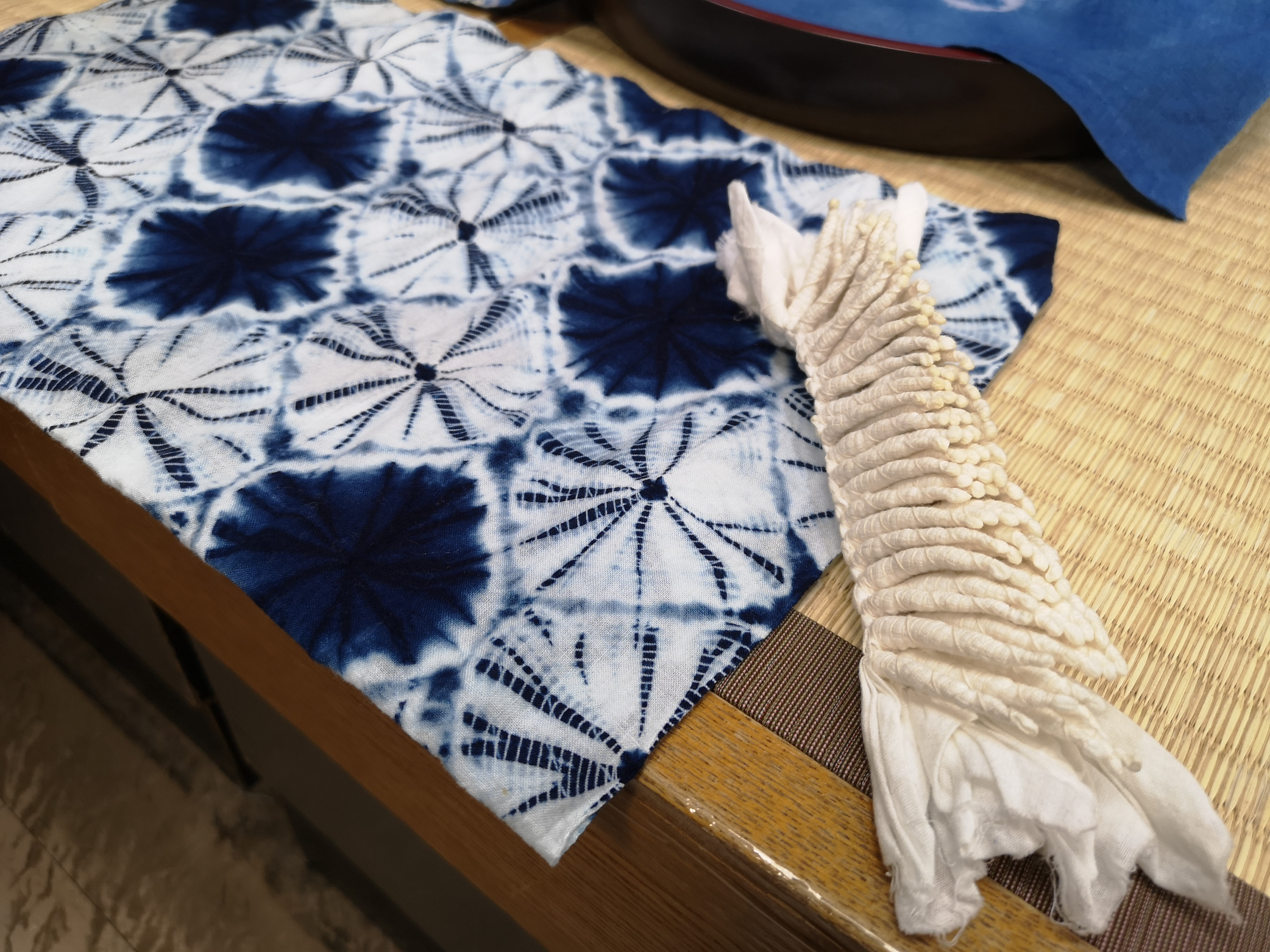
Thread-tied shibori dying technique traditionally used in Japan; cloth ready for dyeing in indigo, and after dyeing

In Japan, indigo became especially important during the Edo period. This was due to a growing textiles industry, and because commoners had been banned from wearing silk, leading to the increasing cultivation of cotton, and consequently indigo – one of the few substances that could dye it.

In North America, indigo was introduced into colonial South Carolina by Eliza Lucas, where it became the colony's second-most important cash crop (after rice). As a major export crop, indigo supported plantation slavery there. In the May and June 1755 issues of The Gentleman's Magazine, there appeared a detailed account of the cultivation of indigo, accompanied by drawings of necessary equipment and a prospective budget for starting such an operation, authored by South Carolina planter Charles Woodmason. It later appeared as a book. By 1775, indigo production in South Carolina exceeded 1,222,000 pounds. When Benjamin Franklin sailed to France in November 1776 to enlist France's support for the American Revolutionary War, 35 barrels of indigo were on board the Reprisal, the sale of which would help fund the war effort. In colonial North America, three commercially important species are found: the native I. caroliniana, and the introduced I. tinctoria and I. suffruticosa.

In the UK the structure of Natural Indigo was still being sought in 1878 when Edward Schunck published on Indigo e.g. Blue from Polygonum tinctorium and By other Plants (16 April 1878) to the Manchester Literary and Philosophical Society

=== Synthetic development ===
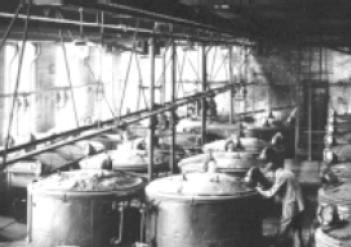
Production of Indigo dye in a BASF plant (1890)

In 1865 the German chemist Adolf von Baeyer began working on the synthesis of indigo. He described his first synthesis of indigo in 1878 (from isatin) and a second synthesis in 1880 (from 2-nitrobenzaldehyde). (It was not until 1883 that Baeyer finally determined the structure of indigo.) The synthesis of indigo remained impractical, so the search for alternative starting materials at Badische Anilin- und Soda-Fabrik (BASF) and Hoechst continued. In 1890, Dr Flimm of Darmstadt, Germany, discovered a simple method for synthesizing indigo with a derivative of acetanilide using caustic potash. This reaction produced a blue compound chemically identical to natural indigo that was identified by its reactions and absorption spectrum. This publication of independent dye synthesis experiments in scientific journals during this period demonstrates that the production of synthetic indigo was a widely pursued goal in industrial chemistry well before BASF's successful market launch. By 1897, BASF had developed an economically viable synthesizing process that replaced natural plant production. Earlier attempts to replace plant-based production were ineffective on an industrial scale. Johannes Pfleger and Karl Heumann eventually came up with industrial mass production synthesis.

The synthesis of N-(2-carboxyphenyl)glycine from the easy to obtain aniline provided a new and economically attractive route. BASF developed a commercially feasible manufacturing process that was in use by 1897, at which time 19,000 tons of indigo were being produced from plant sources. This had dropped to 1,000 tons by 1914 and continued to contract. By 2011, 50,000 tons of synthetic indigo were being produced worldwide.

== Dyeing technology ==
Indigo white (leuco-indigo)

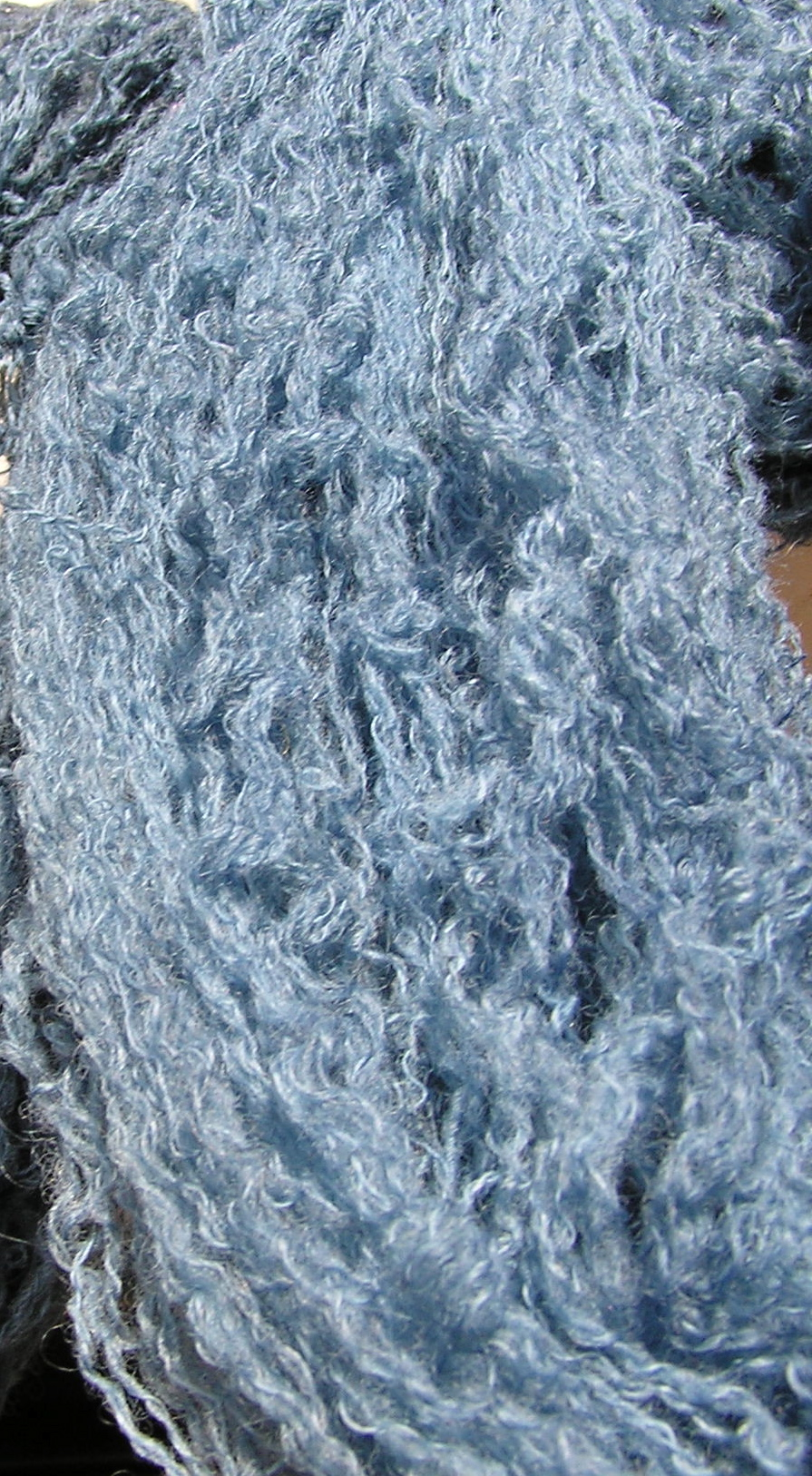
Yarn dyed with indigo dye

=== Indigo white ===
Indigo is a challenging dye because it is not soluble in water. To be dissolved, it must undergo a chemical change (reduction). Reduction converts indigo into "white indigo" (leuco-indigo). When a submerged fabric is removed from the dyebath, the white indigo quickly combines with oxygen in the air and reverts to the insoluble, intensely colored indigo. When it first became widely available in Europe in the 16th century, European dyers and printers struggled with indigo because of this distinctive property. It also required several chemical manipulations, some involving toxic materials, and presented many opportunities to injure workers. In the 19th century, English poet William Wordsworth referred to the plight of indigo dye workers of his hometown of Cockermouth in his autobiographical poem The Prelude. Speaking of their dire working conditions and the empathy that he felt for them, he wrote:

Doubtless, I should have then made common cause
With some who perished; haply perished too
A poor mistaken and bewildered offering
Unknown to those bare souls of miller blue

A pre-industrial process for production of indigo white, used in Europe, was to dissolve the indigo in stale urine, which contains ammonia. A more convenient reductive agent is zinc. Another pre-industrial method, used in Japan, was to dissolve the indigo in a heated vat in which a culture of thermophilic, anaerobic bacteria was maintained. Some species of such bacteria generate hydrogen as a metabolic product, which convert insoluble indigo into soluble indigo white. Cloth dyed in such a vat was decorated with the techniques of shibori (tie-dye), kasuri, katazome, and tsutsugaki. Examples of clothing and banners dyed with these techniques can be seen in the works of Hokusai and other artists.

=== Direct printing ===
Two different methods for the direct application of indigo were developed in England in the 18th century and remained in use well into the 19th century. The first method, known as "pencil blue" because it was most often applied by pencil or brush, could be used to achieve dark hues. Arsenic trisulfide and a thickener were added to the indigo vat. The arsenic compound delayed the oxidation of the indigo long enough to paint the dye onto fabrics.

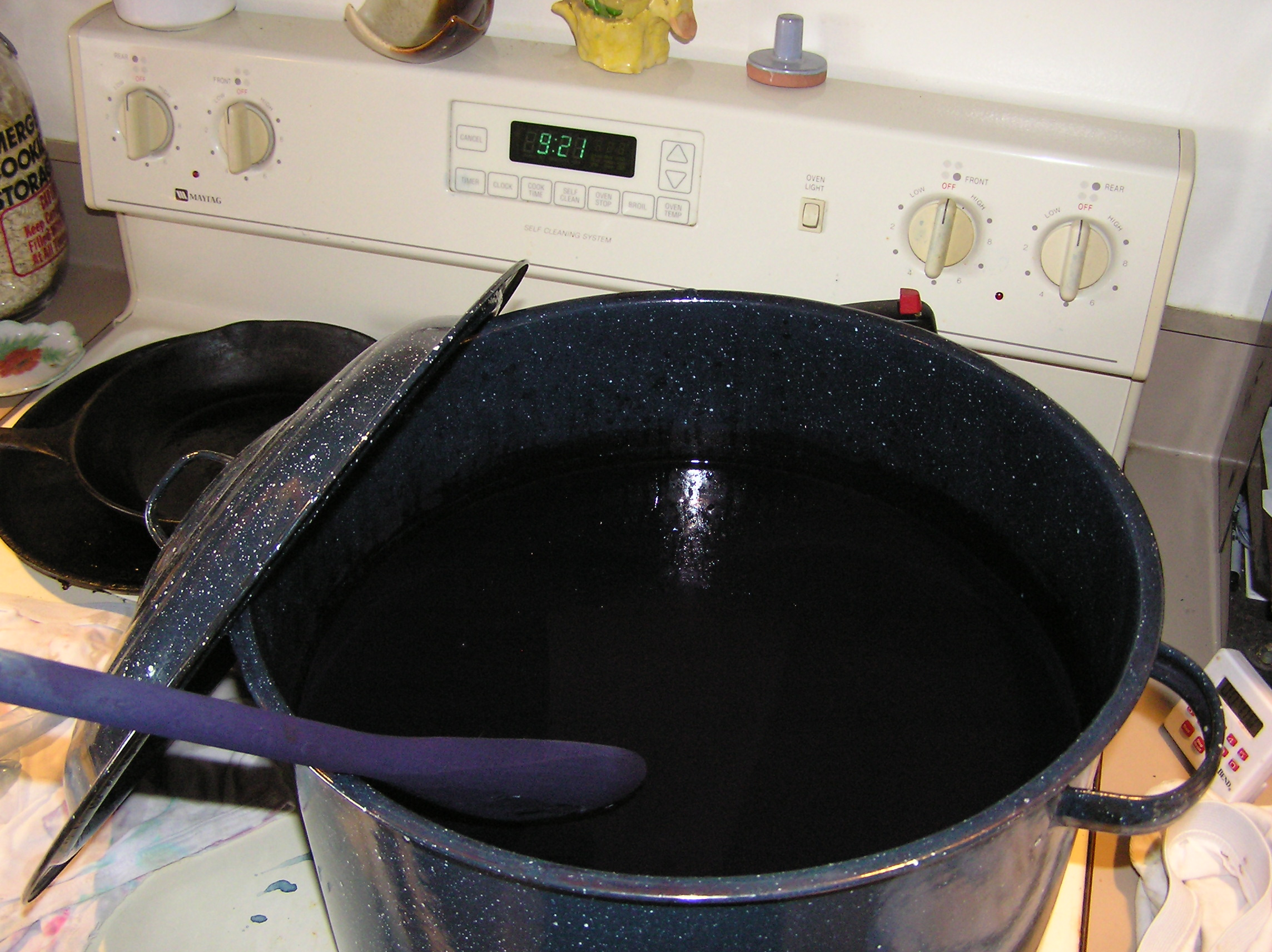
Pot of freeze-dried indigo dye

The second method was known as "China blue" due to its resemblance to Chinese blue-and-white porcelain. Instead of using an indigo solution directly, the process involved printing the insoluble form of indigo onto the fabric. The indigo was then reduced in a sequence of baths of iron(II) sulfate, with air oxidation between each immersion. The China blue process could make sharp designs, but it could not produce the dark hues possible with the pencil blue method.

Around 1880, the "glucose process" was developed. It finally enabled the direct printing of indigo onto fabric and could produce inexpensive dark indigo prints unattainable with the China blue method.

Since 2004, freeze-dried indigo, or instant indigo, has become available. In this method, the indigo has already been reduced, and then freeze-dried into a crystal. The crystals are added to warm water to create the dye pot. As in a standard indigo dye pot, care has to be taken to avoid mixing in oxygen. Freeze-dried indigo is simple to use, and the crystals can be stored indefinitely as long as they are not exposed to moisture.

== Chemical properties ==
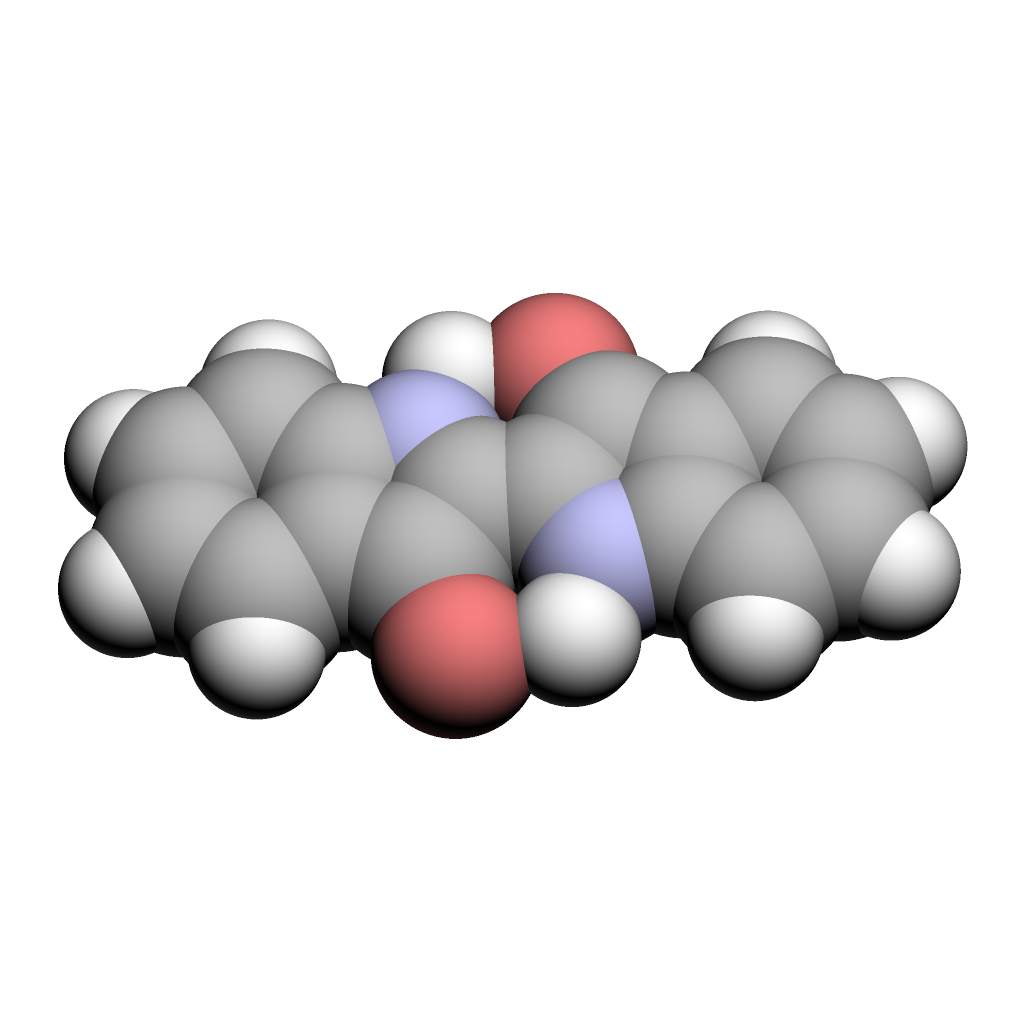
Indigo, space-filling

Indigo dye is a dark blue crystalline powder that sublimes at 390–392 °C (734–738 °F). It is insoluble in water, alcohol, or ether, but soluble in DMSO, chloroform, nitrobenzene, and concentrated sulfuric acid. The chemical formula of indigo is C_{16}H_{10}N_{2}O_{2}.

The molecule absorbs light in the orange part of the spectrum (λ_{max}=613 nm). The compound owes its deep color to the conjugation of the double bonds, i.e. the double bonds within the molecule are adjacent and the molecule is planar. In indigo white, the conjugation is interrupted because the molecule is non-planar.

=== Indigo derivatives ===
Structure of Tyrian purple

Structure of indigo carmine

The benzene rings in indigo can be modified to give a variety of related dyestuffs. Thioindigo, where the two NH groups are replaced by S atoms, is deep red. Tyrian purple is a dull purple dye that is secreted by a common Mediterranean snail. It was highly prized in antiquity. In 1909, its structure was shown to be 6,6'-dibromoindigo (red). 6-bromoindigo (purple) is a component as well. It has never been produced on a commercial basis. The related Ciba blue (5,7,5',7'-tetrabromoindigo) is, however, of commercial value.

Indigo and its derivatives featuring intra- and intermolecular hydrogen bonding have very low solubility in organic solvents. They can be made soluble using transient protecting groups such as the tBOC group, which suppresses intermolecular bonding. Heating of the tBOC indigo results in efficient thermal deprotection and regeneration of the parent H-bonded pigment.

Treatment with sulfuric acid converts indigo into a blue-green derivative called indigo carmine (sulfonated indigo). It became available in the mid-18th century. It is used as a colorant for food, pharmaceuticals, and cosmetics as FD&C Blue No. 2.

== Indigo as an organic semiconductor ==
Indigo and some of its derivatives are known to be ambipolar organic semiconductors when deposited as thin films by vacuum evaporation.

== Safety and the environment ==
Indigo has a low oral toxicity, with an LD_{50} of 5 g/kg (0.5% of total mass) in mammals. In 2009, large spills of blue dye were reported downstream of a blue jeans manufacturer in Lesotho.

The compound has been found to act as an agonist of the aryl hydrocarbon receptor.

== See also ==
- Champaran Satyagraha
- Haint blue
- Indigo revolt
- Red, White, and Black Make Blue
