= 2-Nitrobenzaldehyde =

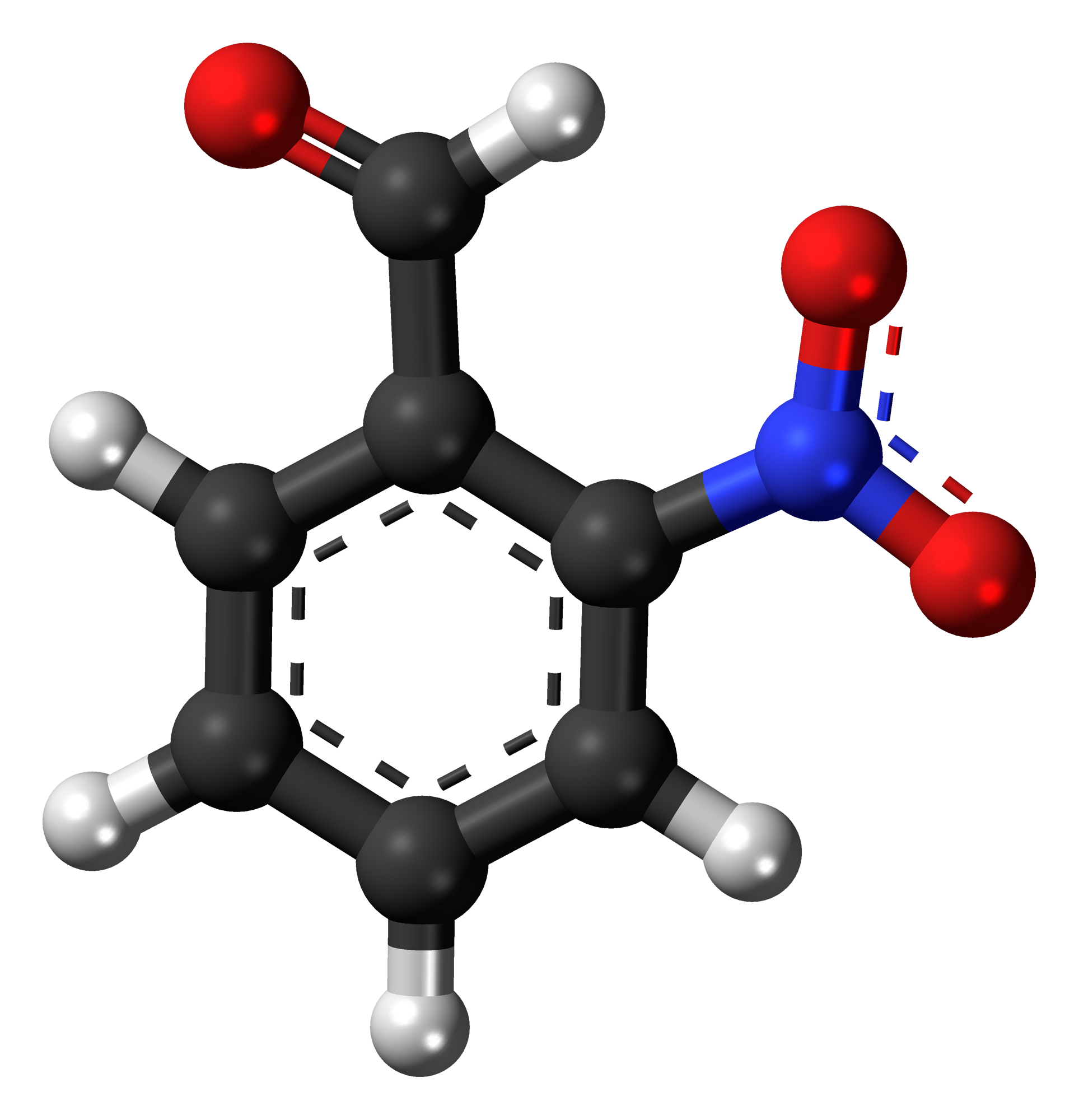

Names
- Preferred IUPAC name 2-Nitrobenzaldehyde
- Other names Nitrobenzaldehyde ortho-Nitrobenzaldehyde o-Nitrobenzaldehyde

Identifiers
CAS Number	552-89-6
3D model (JSmol)	Interactive image
ChEBI	CHEBI:66927
ChEMBL	ChEMBL166559
ChemSpider	10630
ECHA InfoCard	100.008.206
EC Number	209-025-3
PubChem CID	11101
UNII	48B18Q9B8E
CompTox Dashboard (EPA)	DTXSID0022060
- InChI: InChI=1S/C7H5NO3/c9-5-6-3-1-2-4-7(6)8(10)11/h1-5H Key: CMWKITSNTDAEDT-UHFFFAOYSA-N; InChI=1/C7H5NO3/c9-5-6-3-1-2-4-7(6)8(10)11/h1-5H Key: CMWKITSNTDAEDT-UHFFFAOYAD
- SMILES: O=[N+]([O-])c1ccccc1C=O

Properties
Chemical formula	C_{7}H_{5}NO_{3}
Molar mass	151.12 g/mol
Appearance	Pale yellow crystalline powder
Melting point	43 °C (109 °F; 316 K)
Boiling point	152 °C (306 °F; 425 K)
Solubility in water	Insoluble
Magnetic susceptibility (χ)	−68.23·10^{−6} cm^{3}/mol

Hazards
- Occupational safety and health (OHS/OSH)
Main hazards	Harmful, Potentially mutagenic
- GHS labelling
Pictograms	(GHS07: Exclamation mark)
Signal word	Warning
Hazard statements	H302, H315, H319, H335, H412
Precautionary statements	P261, P264, P270, P271, P273, P280, P301+P312, P302+P352, P304+P340, P305+P351+P338, P312, P330, P332+P313, P337+P313, P362, P403+P233, P405, P501
NFPA 704 (fire diamond)	2 1 0
- Except where otherwise noted, data are given for materials in their standard state (at 25 °C [77 °F], 100 kPa). verify (what is ?) Infobox references

2-Nitrobenzaldehyde is an organic compound with the formula O_{2}NC_{6}H_{4}CHO. It is one of three isomers of nitrobenzaldehyde. It contains a nitro group adjacent to the formyl group.

== Synthesis ==
The nitration of benzaldehyde produces mostly 3-nitrobenzaldehyde. Partly for this reason, 2-nitrobenzaldehyde is prepared by indirect routes. The main routes to nitrobenzaldehyde begin with the nitration of styrene or cinnamic acid followed by the conversions of the resulting 2-nitrostyrene and 2-nitrocinnamic acids, respectively. Cinnamaldehyde can also be nitrated in high-yield to 2-nitrocinnamaldehyde. This compound is then oxidized to 2-nitrocinnamic acid, which is decarboxylated to the 2-nitrostyrene. The vinyl group can be oxidized in a number of different ways to yield 2-nitrobenzaldehyde.

2-Nitrotoluene can be oxidized to yield 2-nitrobenzaldehyde.

Alternatively, 2-nitrotoluene as formed above can be halogenated to a 2-nitrobenzyl halide followed by oxidation with DMSO and sodium bicarbonate to yield 2-nitrobenzaldehyde, which is subsequently purified with the creation of a bisulfite adduct.

== Uses ==
2-Nitrobenzaldehyde is an intermediate in an early route to indigo, a water-insoluble dye commonly used to dye jeans and other fabrics. In the Baeyer–Drewsen indigo synthesis, 2-nitrobenzaldehyde condenses with acetone in basic aqueous solution to yield indigo in a one-pot synthesis The method was abandoned in the early part of the 20th century, being replaced by routes from aniline.

Baeyer-Drewson Indigo Synthesis

Given its two relatively reactive groups, 2-nitrobenzaldehyde is a potential starting material for other compounds. Substituted 2-nitrobenzaldehydes can also be used to yield other important compounds based on indigo, such as indigo carmine.

2-Nitrobenzaldehyde has been shown to be a useful photoremovable protecting group for various functions.

Drug uses of 2-nitrobenzaldehyde: Mepixanox (Pimexone), Nifedipine, Encainide, Iferanserin, Aranidipine, Nisoldipine, DHP-218, Mdl-72567.
