= Baeyer–Drewsen indigo synthesis =

Organic reaction in which indigo is prepared from 2-nitrobenzaldehyde and acetone

The Baeyer–Drewsen indigo synthesis (1882) is an organic reaction in which indigo is prepared from 2-nitrobenzaldehyde and acetone The reaction was developed by von Baeyer and Viggo Drewsen in 1880 to produce the first synthetic indigo at laboratory scale. This procedure is not used at industrial scale.

Baeyer-Drewson indigo synthesis

The reaction is classified as an aldol condensation. As a practical route to indigo, this method was displaced by routes from aniline.

== Mechanism ==
Mechnaism of the Baeyer-Drewsen Indigo Synthesis

== Note ==
In the English literature this reaction is sometimes called Baeyer–Drewson reaction, although the author of the original paper was spelled Drewsen.
