= Indoxyl =

Names
- Preferred IUPAC name 1H-Indol-3-ol
- Other names 3-Hydroxyindole

Identifiers
CAS Number	480-93-3
3D model (JSmol)	Interactive image
ChEBI	CHEBI:17840
ChemSpider	45861
ECHA InfoCard	100.216.308
EC Number	689-424-0
KEGG	C05658
PubChem CID	50591
UNII	BZ24HY3WPJ
CompTox Dashboard (EPA)	DTXSID20861998
- InChI: InChI=1S/C8H7NO/c10-8-5-9-7-4-2-1-3-6(7)8/h1-5,9-10H Key: PCKPVGOLPKLUHR-UHFFFAOYSA-N; InChI=1/C8H7NO/c10-8-5-9-7-4-2-1-3-6(7)8/h1-5,9-10H Key: PCKPVGOLPKLUHR-UHFFFAOYAR
- SMILES: Oc2c1ccccc1[nH]c2

Properties
Chemical formula	C_{8}H_{7}NO
Molar mass	133.150 g·mol^{−1}

Hazards
- GHS labelling
Pictograms	(GHS06: Toxic) (GHS09: Environmental hazard)
Signal word	Danger
Hazard statements	H302, H311, H319, H400
Precautionary statements	P264, P270, P273, P280, P301+P312, P302+P352, P305+P351+P338, P312, P322, P330, P337+P313, P361, P363, P391, P405, P501
- Except where otherwise noted, data are given for materials in their standard state (at 25 °C [77 °F], 100 kPa). verify (what is ?) Infobox references

In organic chemistry, indoxyl is a nitrogenous substance with the chemical formula: C_{8}H_{7}NO. Indoxyl is isomeric with oxindol and is obtained as an oily liquid.

== Preparation ==
The Heumann indigo synthesis starts from anthranilic acid:

Anthanilic acid (1) reacts with chloroacetic acid to give phenylglycine-o-carboxylic acid. When treated in molten sodium carbonate, the 2-Indoxycarboxylic acid (3) decarboxylates to give indoxyl (4)

In nature indoxyl is derived from indican, which is a glycoside. The hydrolysis of indican yields β-D-glucose and indoxyl.

Indigo dye is a product of the mild oxidation of indoxyl.

Indoxyl can be found in urine, when associated with indoxyl sulfate, a cardiotoxin, which is detected by titration with Obermayer's reagent, which is a dilute solution of ferric chloride (FeCl_{3}) in hydrochloric acid (HCl).
