= Indican =

Names
- IUPAC name 1H-Indol-3-yl β-D-glucopyranoside
- Systematic IUPAC name (2R,3S,4S,5R,6S)-2-(Hydroxymethyl)-6-[(1H-indol-3-yl)oxy]oxane-3,4,5-triol

Identifiers
CAS Number	487-60-5
3D model (JSmol)	Interactive image
ChemSpider	390239
ECHA InfoCard	100.126.244
PubChem CID	441564
UNII	N187WK1Y1J
CompTox Dashboard (EPA)	DTXSID10903997
- InChI: InChI=1S/C14H17NO6/c16-6-10-11(17)12(18)13(19)14(21-10)20-9-5-15-8-4-2-1-3-7(8)9/h1-5,10-19H,6H2/t10-,11-,12+,13-,14-/m1/s1 Key: XVARCVCWNFACQC-RKQHYHRCSA-N; InChI=1/C14H17NO6/c16-6-10-11(17)12(18)13(19)14(21-10)20-9-5-15-8-4-2-1-3-7(8)9/h1-5,10-19H,6H2/t10-,11-,12+,13-,14-/m1/s1 Key: XVARCVCWNFACQC-RKQHYHRCBQ
- SMILES: C1=CC=C2C(=C1)C(=CN2)OC3C(C(C(C(O3)CO)O)O)O

Properties
Chemical formula	C_{14}H_{17}NO_{6}
Molar mass	295.291 g·mol^{−1}
Appearance	colorless solid
Melting point	178 to 180 °C (352 to 356 °F; 451 to 453 K) (decomposes)
- Except where otherwise noted, data are given for materials in their standard state (at 25 °C [77 °F], 100 kPa). verify (what is ?) Infobox references

Indican is a colourless organic compound, soluble in water, naturally occurring in Indigofera plants. It is a precursor of indigo dye.

== Chemical reactions ==
Indican is a glycoside. Its most significant reaction is hydrolysis of to yields β-D-glucose and indoxyl. Beta-glucosidase, a common enzyme, catalyzes this process. Because the hydrolysis is slow in the absence of the enzyme, indican can be viewed as a protected version of indoxyl. Once formed, the indoxyl is oxidized by atmospheric oxygen to give blue indigo dye. Since synthetic indigo is produced on a massive scale by chemical routes, i.e. 50,000 tons/y (2011), the prospect of a biological pathway is of practical interest.

== Medical significance ==
=== Biosynthesis ===
A reaction, similar to that used to produce indigo dye, is seen in the normal population, who excrete small amounts of the chemical in their urine. Normal urine reacting to hydrogen peroxide does at times produce a bluish tinge. Tryptophan is first converted to indole (which is excreted in faeces), then to indican by bacteria in the gut. Indican, being water-soluble, is then excreted through the urine. Following absorption from the gut, indole is converted to 3-hydroxy indole (indoxyl or indican) in the liver, where it is again then conjugated with sulfuric acid or glucuronic acid through normal xenobiotic metabolism pathways. It is then transported to the kidneys for excretion.

The enzyme "indoxyl esterase" has been found in humans and is involved in another pathway of chemical reactions involving indoxyl.

=== Pathology ===
Individuals affected by blue diaper syndrome exhibit a defect in tryptophan metabolism. Tryptophan is first converted to indole, then to indican by bacteria in the gut. Indican is then excreted into the urine and from there into the diaper where, upon exposure to air, it is oxidised by atmospheric oxygen to indigo blue dye.

Indican interferes with many commercial procedures for measuring total bilirubin which can be a problem for renal failure patients whose blood indican levels are raised. It can cause gastrointestinal symptoms in patients whose protein absorption is reduced, as in Hartnup's disease, allowing for greater bacterial decomposition of the tryptophan to indole and its conversion to indican.
