= 1,1,1-Trichloroacetone =

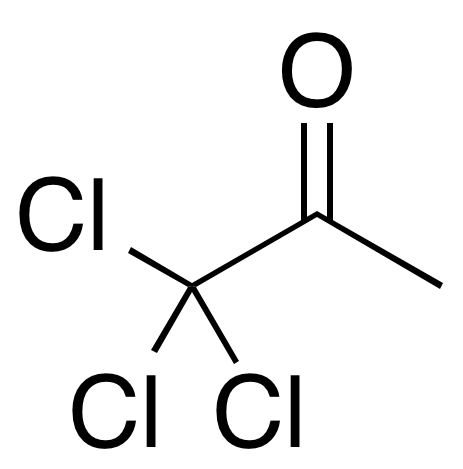

Names
- Preferred IUPAC name 1,1,1-Trichloropropan-2-one
- Other names 1,1,1-Trichloroacetone; 1,1,1-Trichloropropanone

Identifiers
CAS Number	918-00-3
3D model (JSmol)	Interactive image
ChEMBL	ChEMBL3185648
ChemSpider	12926
ECHA InfoCard	100.149.432
EC Number	620-529-6
PubChem CID	13514
UNII	NW27ZG5LDA
CompTox Dashboard (EPA)	DTXSID5021679
- InChI: InChI=1S/C3H3Cl3O/c1-2(7)3(4,5)6/h1H3 Key: SMZHKGXSEAGRTI-UHFFFAOYSA-N
- SMILES: CC(=O)C(Cl)(Cl)Cl

Properties
Chemical formula	C_{3}H_{3}Cl_{3}O
Molar mass	161.41 g·mol^{−1}
Appearance	Colourless liquid
Density	1.475 g/cm^{3}
Boiling point	134 °C (273 °F; 407 K)
Solubility in water	slightly soluble
Solubility	Soluble in ethanol and diethyl ether

Hazards
- Occupational safety and health (OHS/OSH)
Main hazards	Irritant
- GHS labelling
Pictograms	(GHS07: Exclamation mark)
Signal word	Warning
Hazard statements	H315, H319, H335
Precautionary statements	P261, P264, P271, P280, P302+P352, P304+P340, P305+P351+P338, P312, P321, P332+P313, P337+P313, P362, P403+P233, P405, P501
Flash point	64 °C (147 °F; 337 K)
- Except where otherwise noted, data are given for materials in their standard state (at 25 °C [77 °F], 100 kPa). Infobox references

1,1,1-Trichloroacetone is a chlorinated analogue of acetone with the chemical formula CH_{3}COCCl_{3}. It is a colourless liquid. 1,1,1-Trichloroacetone can be synthesised from chlorination of chloroacetone (1,1,3-trichloroacetone is formed as a by-product). An alternative synthesis involves the transfer of a trichloromethyl group from trichloroacetate onto acetyl chloride.

== See also ==
- Chloroacetone
- 1,3-Dichloroacetone
- Hexachloroacetone
