= Monocarboxylate transporter 10 =

Protein found in humans

SLC16A10

Identifiers
- Aliases: SLC16A10, MCT10, PRO0813, TAT1, solute carrier family 16 member 10
- External IDs: OMIM: 607550; MGI: 1919722; GeneCards: SLC16A10

Gene location (Human)
Chr.	Chromosome 6 (human)
Band	6q21	Start	111,087,503 bp
Band	6q21	End	111,231,194 bp

Gene location (Mouse)
Chr.	Chromosome 10 (mouse)
Band	10|10 B1	Start	39,909,528 bp
Band	10|10 B1	End	40,018,254 bp
RNA expression pattern
Bgee	Human / Mouse (ortholog); Top expressed in: gastrocnemius muscle; secondary oocyte; gonad; Skeletal muscle tissue of rectus abdominis; buccal mucosa cell; Skeletal muscle tissue of biceps brachii; duodenum; vastus lateralis muscle; jejunal mucosa; vulva / Top expressed in: jejunum; secondary oocyte; islet of Langerhans; epithelium of small intestine; zygote; liver; blood; primary oocyte; ileum; quadriceps femoris muscle; More reference expression data
BioGPS	n/a
Gene ontology
Molecular function	aromatic amino acid transmembrane transporter activity; thyroid hormone transmembrane transporter activity; amino acid transmembrane transporter activity; monocarboxylic acid transmembrane transporter activity
Cellular component	plasma membrane; basolateral plasma membrane; integral component of plasma membrane; membrane; integral component of membrane
Biological process	thyroid hormone transport; amino acid transport; aromatic amino acid transport; transmembrane transport; amino acid transmembrane transport; monocarboxylic acid transport
Sources:Amigo / QuickGO
Orthologs
Databases	NCBI: entry; OMA: entry
Species	Human	Mouse
Entrez	117247	72472
Ensembl	ENSG00000112394	ENSMUSG00000019838
UniProt	Q8TF71	Q3U9N9
RefSeq (mRNA)	NM_018593	NM_001114332; NM_028247
RefSeq (protein)	NP_061063	NP_001107804; NP_082523
Location (UCSC)	Chr 6: 111.09 – 111.23 Mb	Chr 10: 39.91 – 40.02 Mb
PubMed search
- Wikidata
View/Edit Human	View/Edit Mouse

Monocarboxylate transporter 10 (MCT 10), also known as aromatic amino acid transporter 1 and T-type amino acid transporter 1 (TAT1) and solute carrier family 16 member 10 (SLC16A10), is a protein that in humans is encoded by the SLC16A10 gene. SLC16A10 is a member of the solute carrier family.

== Function ==
SLC16A10 mediates Na^{+}-independent transport of tryptophan, tyrosine, phenylalanine, and L-DOPA.

== See also ==
- Blue diaper syndrome
