= 3-Nitrobenzaldehyde =

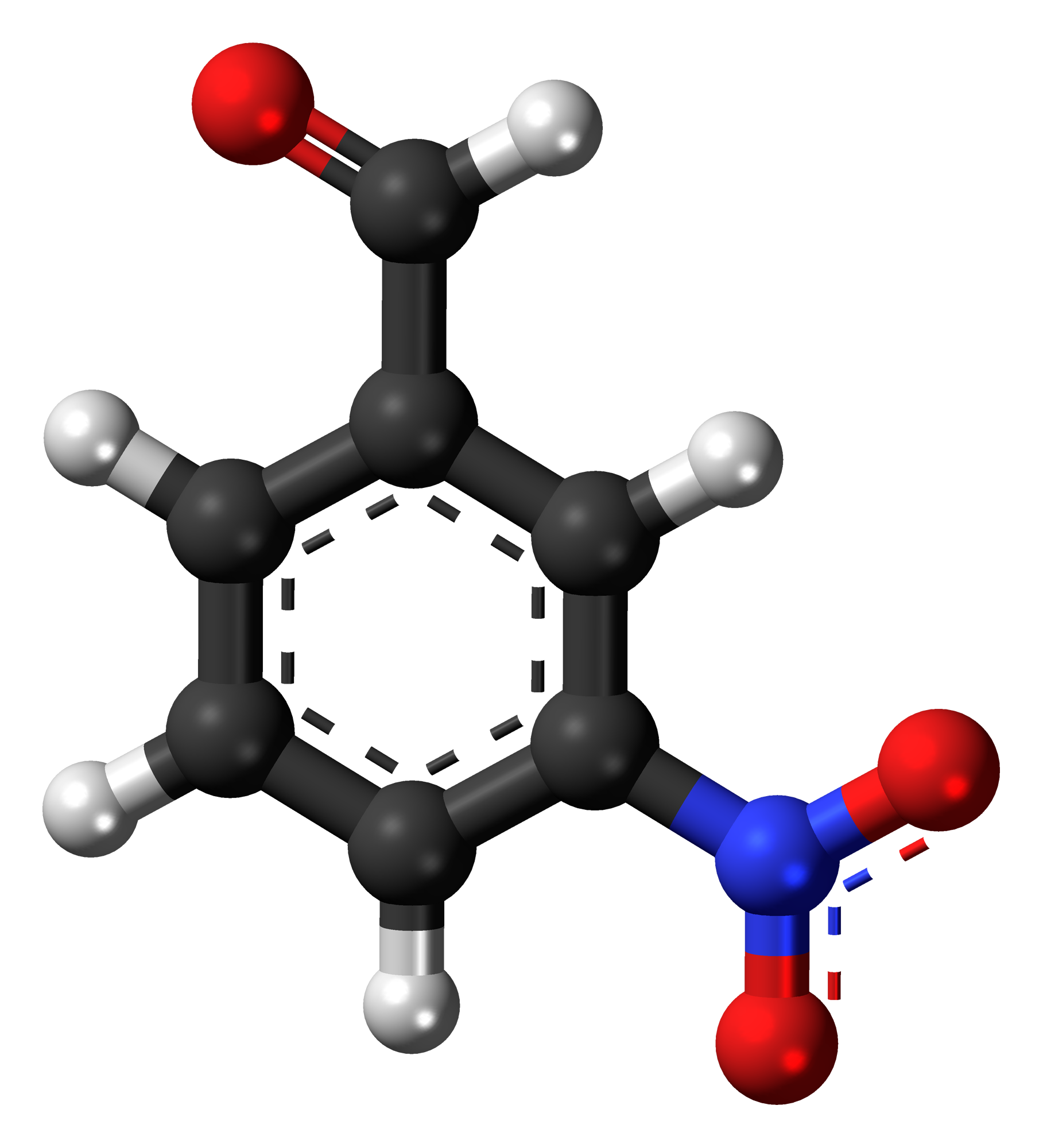

Names
- Preferred IUPAC name 3-Nitrobenzaldehyde
- Other names m-Nitrobenzaldehyde, meta-nitrobenzaldehyde

Properties
Chemical formula	C_{7}H_{5}NO_{3}
Molar mass	151.121 g·mol^{−1}
Appearance	Yellowish to brownish crystalline powder or granulate
Melting point	58.5 °C (137.3 °F; 331.6 K)
Boiling point	164 °C (327 °F; 437 K) at 23 mmHg
Solubility in water	16.3 mg/mL
Magnetic susceptibility (χ)	−68.55·10^{−6} cm^{3}/mol

Identifiers
CAS Number	99-61-6
3D model (JSmol)	Interactive image
ChEBI	CHEBI:231487
ChEMBL	ChEMBL238132
ChemSpider	7169
ECHA InfoCard	100.002.520
EC Number	202-772-6
PubChem CID	7449
UNII	G4O92KO71Z
CompTox Dashboard (EPA)	DTXSID8049383
- InChI: InChI=1S/C7H5NO3/c9-5-6-2-1-3-7(4-6)8(10)11/h1-5H Key: ZETIVVHRRQLWFW-UHFFFAOYSA-N; InChI=1/C7H5NO3/c9-5-6-2-1-3-7(4-6)8(10)11/h1-5H Key: ZETIVVHRRQLWFW-UHFFFAOYAC
- SMILES: O=[N+]([O-])c1cc(C=O)ccc1

Hazards
- Occupational safety and health (OHS/OSH)
Main hazards	Harmful, Potentially mutagenic
- GHS labelling
Pictograms	(GHS07: Exclamation mark) (GHS09: Environmental hazard)
Signal word	Warning
Hazard statements	H302, H315, H319, H335, H411
Precautionary statements	P261, P264, P270, P271, P273, P280, P301+P312, P302+P352, P304+P340, P305+P351+P338, P312, P321, P330, P332+P313, P337+P313, P362, P391, P403+P233, P405, P501
NFPA 704 (fire diamond)	2 1 0
- Except where otherwise noted, data are given for materials in their standard state (at 25 °C [77 °F], 100 kPa). verify (what is ?) Infobox references

3-Nitrobenzaldehyde is an organic compound with the formula O_{2}NC_{6}H_{4}CHO. It is one of three isomers of nitrobenzaldehyde. It contains a nitro group meta-substituted to the aldehyde.

3-Nitrobenzaldehyde is the primary product obtained via the mono-nitration of benzaldehyde with nitric acid.

C_{6}H_{5}CHO + HNO_{3} → O_{2}NC_{6}H_{4}CHO + H_{2}O

Product distribution is about 19% for the ortho-, 72% for the meta- and 9% for the para isomers.

== Uses ==
3-Nitrobenzaldehyde is a precursor to the drug tipranavir. It is a mainstay in the synthesis of dihydropyridine calcium channel blockers. Via selective reduction of the nitro group, it is a precursor to the diazonium salt.
