= 4-Nitrobenzaldehyde =

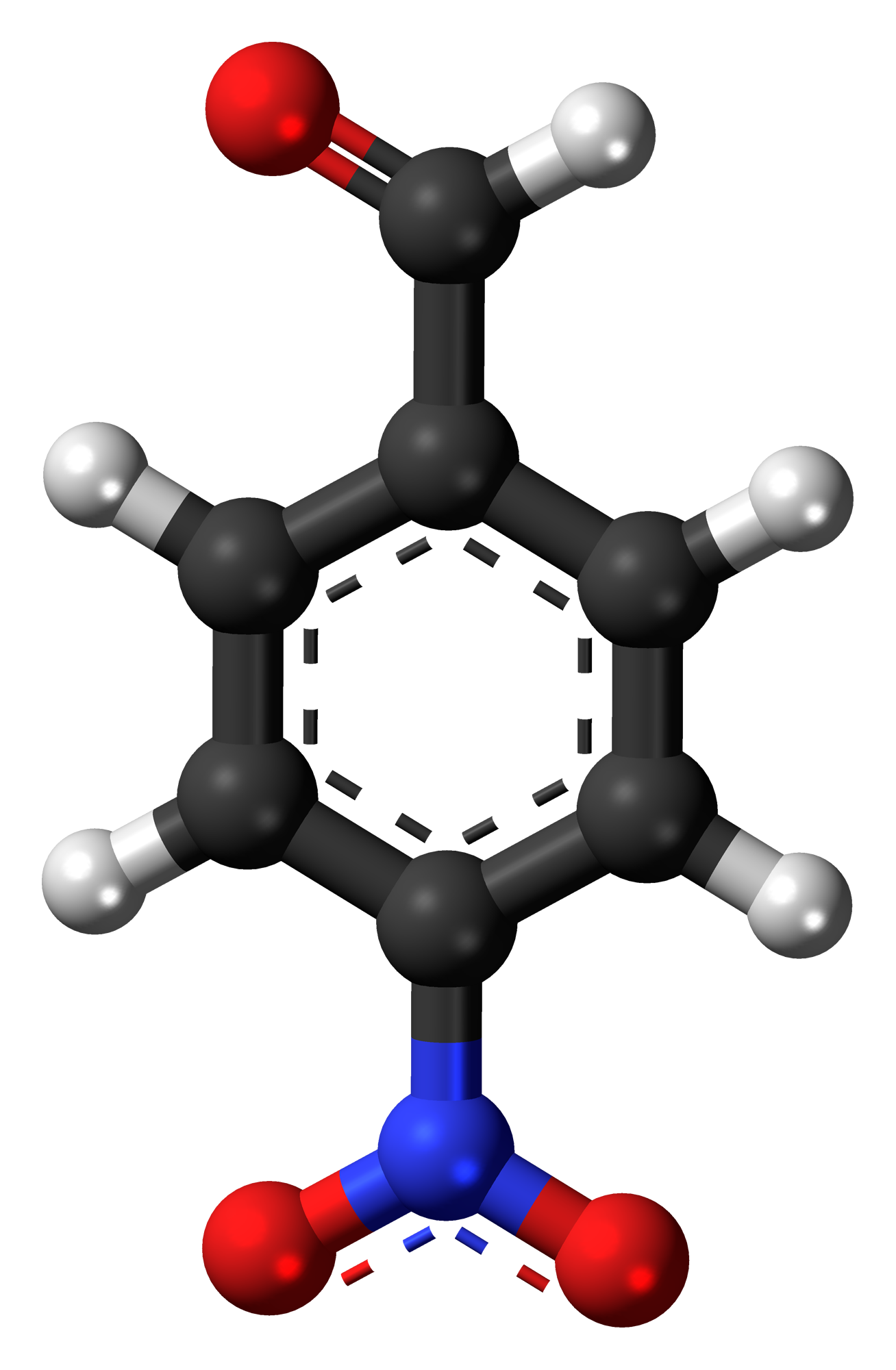

Names
- Preferred IUPAC name 4-Nitrobenzaldehyde
- Other names p-Nitrobenzaldehyde

Properties
Chemical formula	C_{7}H_{5}NO_{3}
Molar mass	151.121 g·mol^{−1}
Appearance	slightly yellowish crystalline powder
Density	1.546 g/cm^{3}
Melting point	103 to 106 °C (217 to 223 °F; 376 to 379 K)
Boiling point	300 °C (572 °F; 573 K)
Magnetic susceptibility (χ)	−66.57·10^{−6} cm^{3}/mol

Identifiers
CAS Number	555-16-8
3D model (JSmol)	Interactive image
ChEBI	CHEBI:66926
ChEMBL	ChEMBL164236
ChemSpider	526
ECHA InfoCard	100.008.259
PubChem CID	541
UNII	NX859P8MB0
CompTox Dashboard (EPA)	DTXSID5022061
- InChI: InChI=1S/C7H5NO3/c9-5-6-1-3-7(4-2-6)8(10)11/h1-5H Key: BXRFQSNOROATLV-UHFFFAOYSA-N; InChI=1/C7H5NO3/c9-5-6-1-3-7(4-2-6)8(10)11/h1-5H Key: BXRFQSNOROATLV-UHFFFAOYAO
- SMILES: O=[N+]([O-])c1ccc(C=O)cc1

Hazards
- GHS labelling
Pictograms	(GHS07: Exclamation mark)
Hazard statements	H317, H319
Precautionary statements	P280, P305+P351+P338
- Except where otherwise noted, data are given for materials in their standard state (at 25 °C [77 °F], 100 kPa). verify (what is ?) Infobox references

4-Nitrobenzaldehyde is an organic compound with the formula O_{2}NC_{6}H_{4}CHO. It is one of three isomers of nitrobenzaldehyde. It contains a nitro group para-substituted to an aldehyde.

4-Nitrobenzaldehyde is obtained by oxidation of 4-nitrotoluene or hydrolysis of 4-nitrobenzalbromide:

O_{2}NC_{6}H_{4}CHBr_{2} + H_{2}O → O_{2}NC_{6}H_{4}CHO + 2 HBr

In the laboratory, the oxidation is achieved with chromium(VI) oxide in acetic anhydride, which affords nitrobenzyldiacetate.
