= Nucleophilic conjugate addition =

Organic reaction

Nucleophilic conjugate addition

Nucleophilic conjugate addition is a type of organic reaction. Ordinary nucleophilic additions or 1,2-nucleophilic additions deal mostly with additions to carbonyl compounds. Simple alkene compounds do not show 1,2 reactivity due to lack of polarity, unless the alkene is activated with special substituents. With α,β-unsaturated carbonyl compounds such as cyclohexenone it can be deduced from resonance structures that the β position is an electrophilic site which can react with a nucleophile. The negative charge in these structures is stored as an alkoxide anion. Such a nucleophilic addition is called a nucleophilic conjugate addition or 1,4-nucleophilic addition. The most important active alkenes are the aforementioned conjugated carbonyls and acrylonitriles.

== Reaction mechanism ==
Conjugate addition is the vinylogous counterpart of direct nucleophilic addition. A nucleophile reacts with a α,β-unsaturated carbonyl compound in the β position. The negative charge carried by the nucleophile is now delocalized in the alkoxide anion and the α carbon carbanion by resonance. Protonation leads through keto-enol tautomerism to the saturated carbonyl compound. In vicinal difunctionalization the proton is replaced by another electrophile.

=== Regioselectivity ===
In conjugate addition reactions there is often competing 1,2- addition (direct addition to carbonyl). This can be rationalized by hard-soft acid base theory. The β-position is considered to be the "soft" electrophilic position of an enone and therefore will react preferentially with soft nucleophiles. One common strategy to favour conjugate addition of organometallic nucleophiles (e.g. Grignards or Organolithiums) to the β-position is to perform transmetalation with copper salts.

== Reactions ==
- Conjugated carbonyls react with secondary amines to form 3-aminocarbonyls (Mannich bases). For example, the conjugate addition of methylamine to cyclohexen-2-one gives the compound 3-(N-methylamino)-cyclohexanone.
- Conjugated carbonyls react with hydrogen cyanide to 1,4-keto-nitriles. See hydrocyanation of unsaturated carbonyls. In the Nagata reaction the cyanide source is diethylaluminum cyanide.
- The Gilman reagent is an effective nucleophile for 1,4-additions to conjugated carbonyls.
- The Michael reaction involves conjugate additions of enolates to conjugated carbonyls.
- The Stork enamine reaction involves the conjugate addition of enamines to conjugated carbonyls.

== Scope ==
Conjugate addition is effective in the formation of new carbon-carbon bonds with the help of organometallic reagents such as the organozinc iodide reaction with methylvinylketone.

(4R',5R')-5-(5-Ethyl-2,2-dimethyl-[1,3]-dioxolan-4-yl)-pentan-2-one

An example of an asymmetric synthesis by conjugate addition is the synthesis of (R)-3-phenyl-cyclohexanone from cyclohexenone, phenylboronic acid, a rhodium acac catalyst and the chiral ligand BINAP.

(R)-3-phenyl-cyclohexanone

In another example of asymmetric synthesis the α,β-unsaturated carbonyl compound first reacts with a chiral imidazolidinone catalyst and chiral auxiliary to an iminium compound in an alkylimino-de-oxo-bisubstitution which then reacts enantioselective with the furan nucleophile. The immediate reaction product is a nucleophilic enamine and the reaction cascades with abstraction of chlorine from a chlorinated quinone. After removal of the amine catalyst the ketone is effectively functionalized with a nucleophile and an electrophile with syn:anti ratio of 8:1 and 97% enantiomeric excess.

Enantioselective organocascade catalysis

This principle is also applied in an enantioselective multicomponent domino conjugated addition of nucleophilic thiols such as benzylmercaptan and electrophilic DEAD.

Enantioselective conjugated addition of thiols to unsaturated aldehydes

== Toxicology ==
Suitably soluble Michael acceptors are toxic, because they alkylate DNA by conjugate addition. Such modification induces mutations, which are cytotoxic and carcinogenic. However, glutathione is also able to react with them and for example dimethyl fumarate reacts with it.

== See also ==
- Nucleophilic abstraction
