= Cyclohexanone dehydrogenase =

cyclohexanone dehydrogenase

Identifiers
- EC no.: 1.3.99.14
- CAS no.: 123516-43-8

Databases
- IntEnz: IntEnz view
- BRENDA: BRENDA entry
- ExPASy: NiceZyme view
- KEGG: KEGG entry
- MetaCyc: metabolic pathway
- PRIAM: profile
- PDB structures: RCSB PDB PDBe PDBsum
- Gene Ontology: AmiGO / QuickGO
Search
- PMC: articles
- PubMed: articles
- NCBI: proteins

In enzymology, cyclohexanone dehydrogenase (EC 1.3.99.14) is an enzyme that catalyzes a redox chemical reaction of the form

cyclohexanone
+ electron acceptor
cyclohexenone
+ reduced acceptor

The two substrates of this enzyme are cyclohexanone and a electron acceptor. Its products are cyclohexenone and reduced acceptor.

This enzyme belongs to the family of oxidoreductases, specifically those acting on the CH-CH group of donor with other acceptors. The systematic name of this enzyme class is cyclohexanone:acceptor 2-oxidoreductase. This enzyme is also called cyclohexanone:(acceptor) 2-oxidoreductase.
