= Enders SAMP/RAMP hydrazone-alkylation reaction =

Chemical reaction

The Enders SAMP/RAMP hydrazone alkylation reaction is an asymmetric carbon-carbon bond formation reaction facilitated by pyrrolidine chiral auxiliaries. It was pioneered by E. J. Corey and Dieter Enders in 1976, and was further developed by Enders and his group. This method is usually a three-step sequence. The first step is to form the hydrazone between (S)-1-amino-2-methoxymethylpyrrolidine (SAMP) or (R)-1-amino-2-methoxymethylpyrrolidine (RAMP) and a ketone or aldehyde. Afterwards, the hydrazone is deprotonated by lithium diisopropylamide (LDA) to form an azaenolate, which reacts with alkyl halides or other suitable electrophiles to give alkylated hydrazone species with the simultaneous generation of a new chiral center. Finally, the alkylated ketone or aldehyde can be regenerated by ozonolysis or hydrolysis.

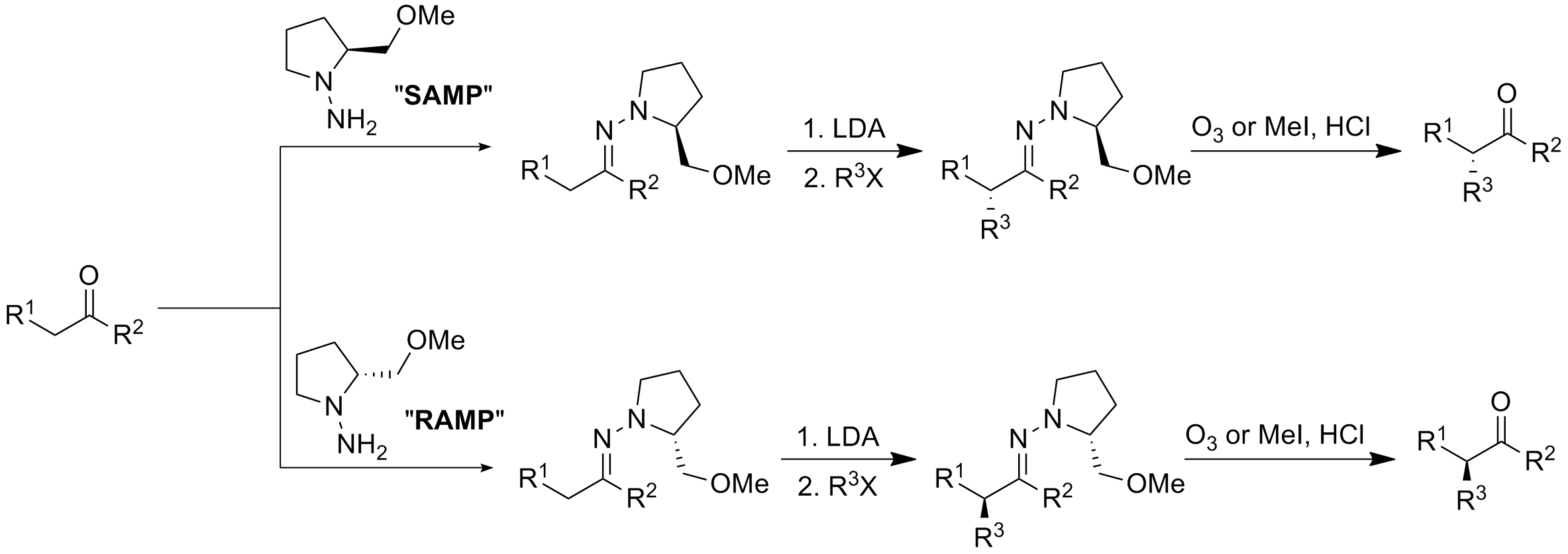
Enders' SAMP/RAMP Hydrazone Alkylation Reaction

This reaction is a useful technique for asymmetric α-alkylation of ketones and aldehydes, which are common synthetic intermediates for medicinally interesting natural products and other related organic compounds. These natural products include (-)-C10-demethyl arteannuin B, the structural analog of antimalarial artemisinin, the polypropionate metabolite (-)-denticulatin A and B isolated from Siphonaria denticulata, zaragozic acid A, a potent inhibitor of sterol synthesis, and epothilone A and B, which have been proven to be very effective anticancer drugs.

== History ==
Regioselective and stereoselective formation of carbon-carbon bonds adjacent to carbonyl group is an important procedure in organic chemistry. Alkylation reaction of enolates has been the main focus of the field. Both A. G. Myers and D. A. Evans developed asymmetric alkylation reactions for enolates.

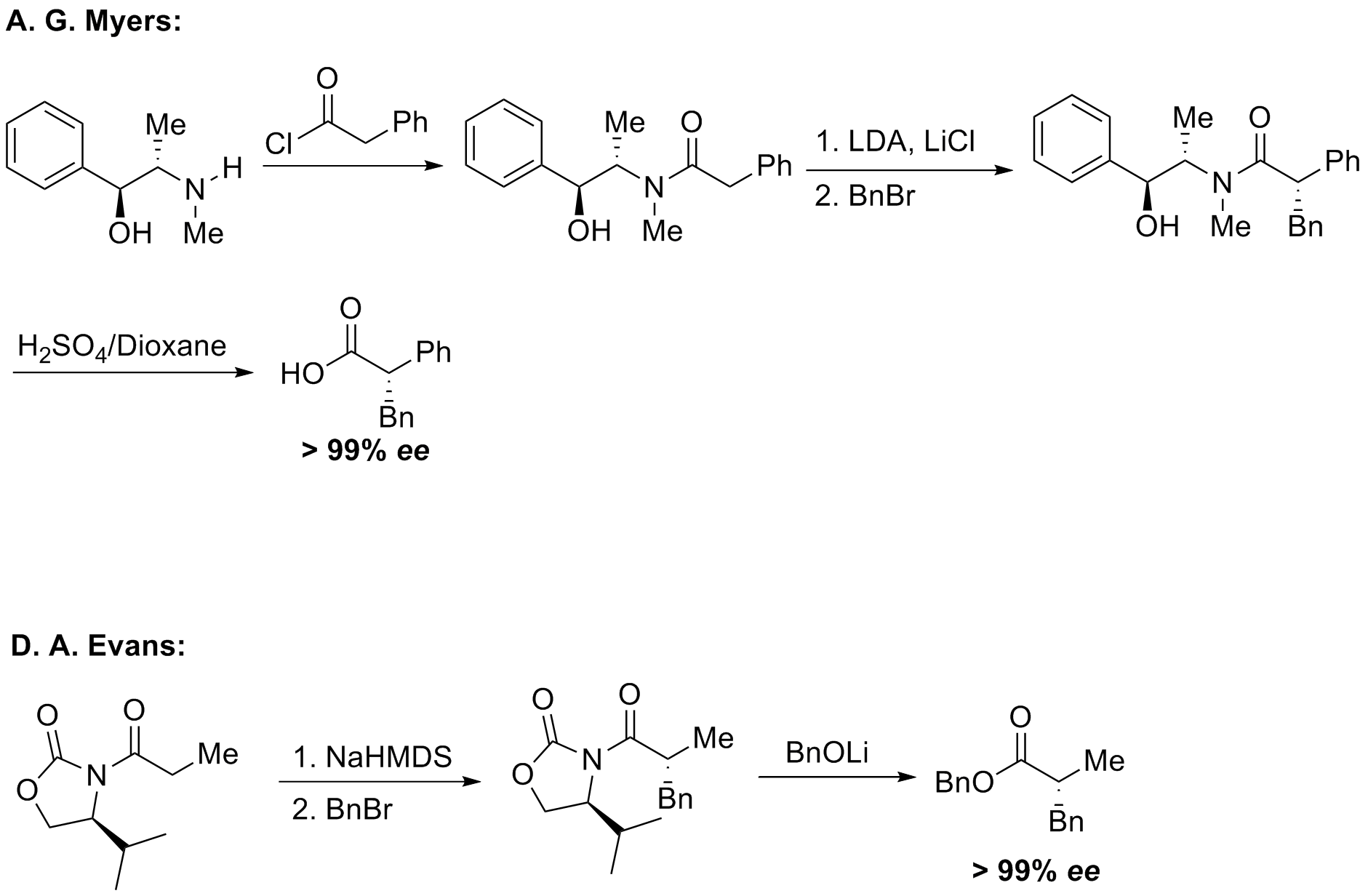
Myer's and Evans' Asymmetric Alkylation

The apparent shortcoming for enolate alkylation reactions is over-alkylation, even if the amount of base added for enolization as well as the reaction temperature are carefully controlled. The ketene formation during the deprotonation process for substrates possessing Evans' oxazolidinone is also a main side reaction for the related alkylation reactions. Development in the field of enamine chemistry and the utilization of imine derivatives of enolates managed to provide an alternative for enolate alkylation reactions.

In 1963, G. Stork reported the first enamine alkylation reaction for ketones - Stork enamine alkylation reaction.

A specific Stork enamine alkylation reaction between cyclohexanone and an electrophile.

In 1976, Meyers reported the first alkylation reaction of metallated azaenolates of hydrazones with an acyclic amino acid-based auxiliary. Compared with the free carbonyl compounds and the chiral enamine species reported previously, the hydrazones exhibit higher reactivity, regioselectivity and stereoselectivity.

Hydrazone alkylation developed by Meyer.

The combination of cyclic amino acid derivatives (SAMP and RAMP) and the powerful hydrazone techniques were pioneered by E. J. Corey and D. Enders in 1976, and were independently developed by D. Enders later. Both SAMP and RAMP are synthesized from amino acids. The detailed synthesis of these two auxiliaries are shown below.

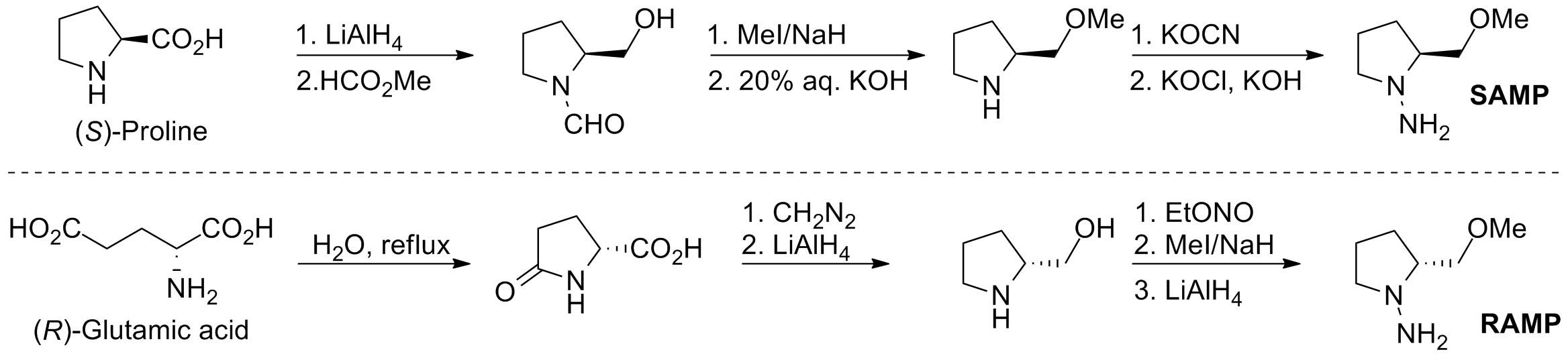
EndersSAMP 2

== Mechanism ==
The Enders SAMP/RAMP hydrazone alkylation begins with the synthesis of the hydrazone from a N,N-dialkylhydrazine and a ketone or aldehyde

The hydrazone is then deprotonated on the α-carbon position by a strong base, such as lithium diisopropylamide (LDA), leading to the formation of a resonance stabilized anion - an azaenolate. This anion is a very good nucleophile and readily attacks electrophiles, such as alkyl halides, to generate alkylated hydrazones with simultaneous creation of a new chiral center at the α-carbon.

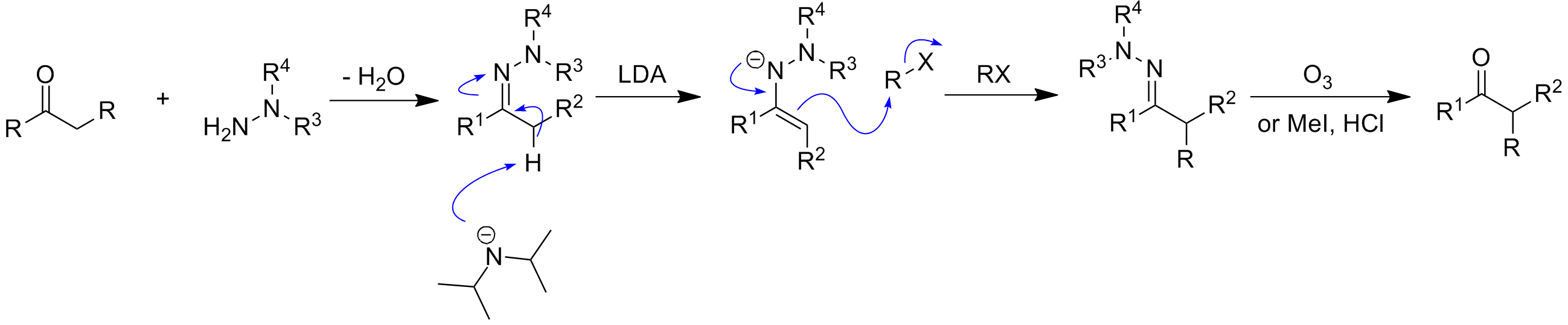
Mechanism of hydrazone alkylation

The stereochemistry of this reaction is discussed in detail in next section.

== Stereochemistry ==
=== Stereochemistry of the azaenolate ===
After the deprotonation, the hydrazone turns into an azaenolate with lithium cation chelating both the nitrogen and oxygen. There are two possible options for lithium chelation. One is that lithium is antiperiplanar to the C=C bond (blue colored), leading to the conformation of Z_{C-N}; the other one is that lithium and the C=C bond are at the same side of the C-N bond (red colored), leading to the E_{C-N} conformer. There are also two available orientations for the chelating nitrogen and R^{2} group, being either E_{C=C} or Z_{C=C}. This leads to four possible azaenolate intermediates (A, B, C and D) for the Enders' SAMP/RAMP hydrazone alkylation reaction.

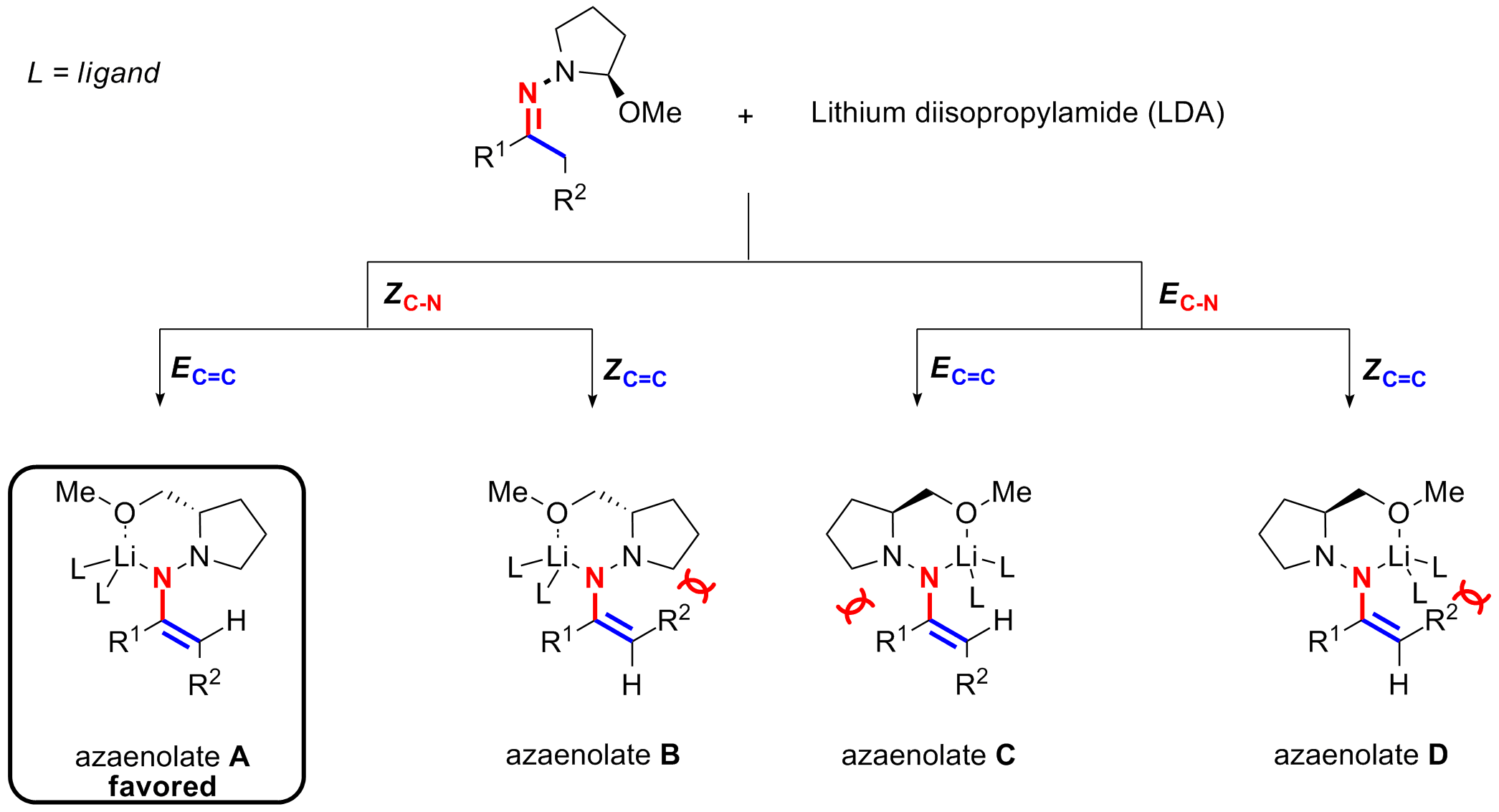
Stereoselectivity of the generation of the azaenolates

Experiments and calculations show that one specific stereoisomer of the azaenolate is favored over the other three possible candidates. Therefore, although four isomers are possible for the azaenolate, only the one (azaenolate A) with the stereochemistry of its C=C double bonds being E and that of its C-N bond being Z stereochemistry is dominant (E_{C=C}Z_{C-N}) for both cyclic and acyclic ketones.

=== Stereochemistry of alkylation ===
The favored azaenolate is the dominant starting molecule for the subsequent alkylation reaction. There are two possible faces of accessing for any electrophile to react with. The steric interaction between the pyrrolidine ring and the electrophilic reagent hinders the attack of the electrophile from the top face. On the contrary, when the electrophile attacks from the bottom face, such unfavorable interaction does not exist. Therefore, the electrophilic attack proceeds from the sterically more accessible face.

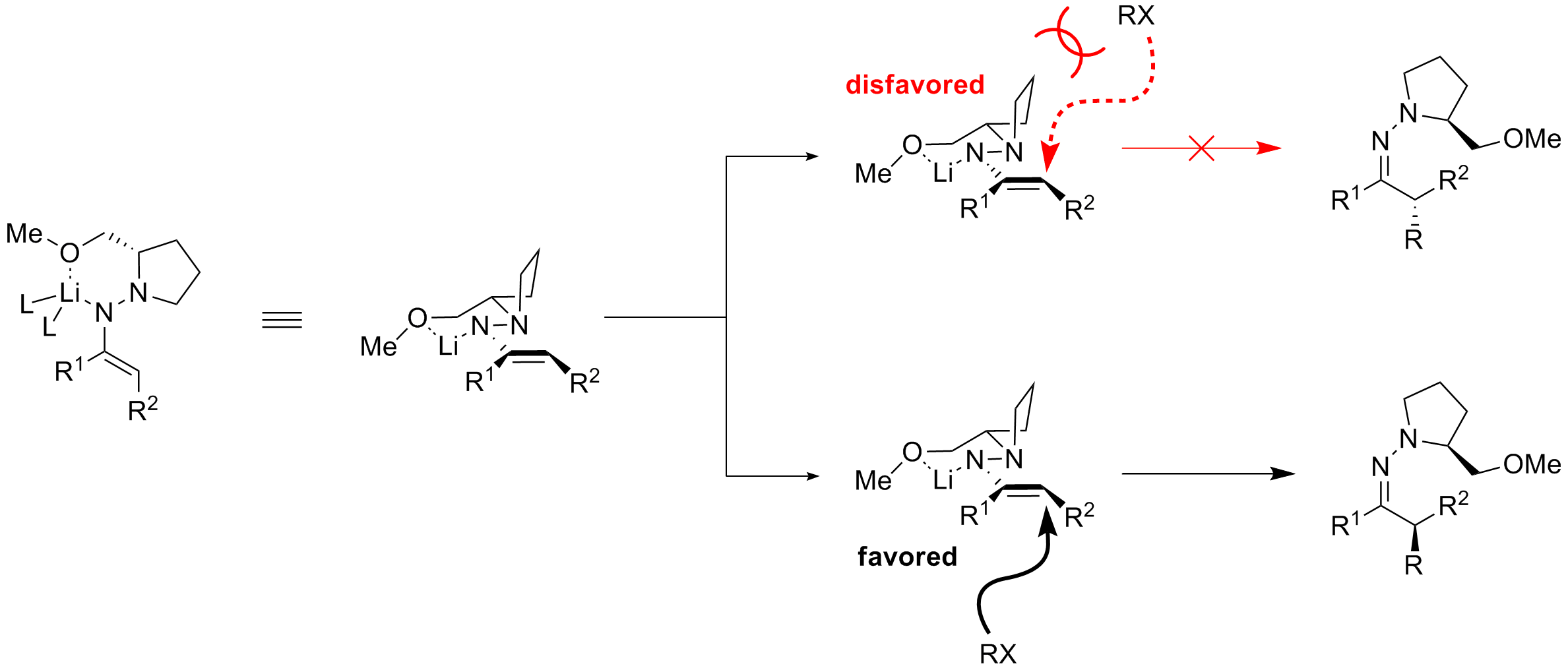
Stereoselectivity for the alkylation step of the Enders' reaction

== Variants ==
The chelation of lithium cation with the methoxy group is one of the most important features of the transition state for Enders' hydrazone alkylation reaction. It is necessary to have this chelation effect to achieve high stereoselectivity. The development and modification of Enders' hydrazone alkylation reaction mainly focus on the addition of more steric hindrance on the pyrrolidine rings of both SAMP and RAMP, while preserving the methoxy group for lithium chelation.

The most famous four variants of SAMP and RAMP are SADP, SAEP, SAPP and RAMBO, whose structures are shown below.

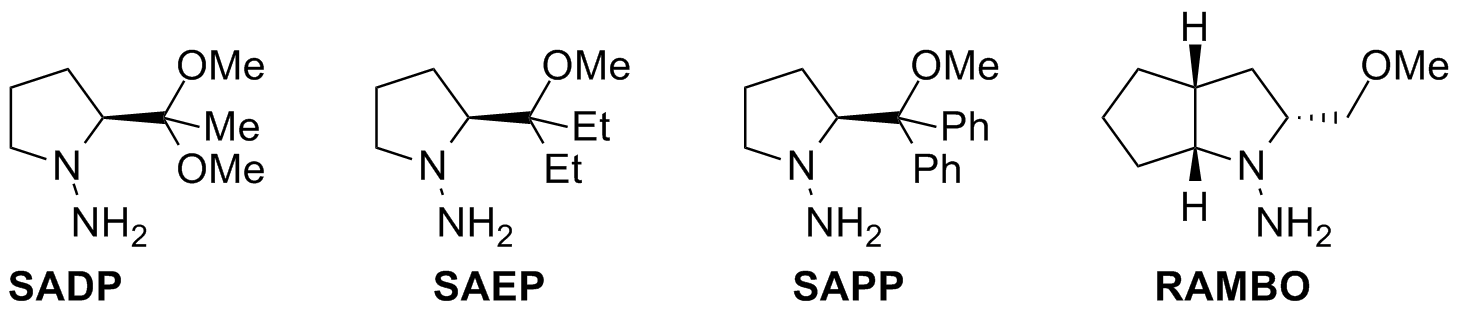
Variants of SAMP/RAMP with bulkier groups attached

In 2011, several N-amino cyclic carbamates were synthesized and studied for asymmetric hydrazone alkylation reactions. Both the stereochemistry and regioselectivity of the reactions turned out to be very promising. These new compounds consist of a new class of chiral auxiliary based on the carbamate structure and, therefore, no longer belong to the family of SAMP and RAMP. But they do provide very powerful alternatives to the traditional pyrrolidine systems.

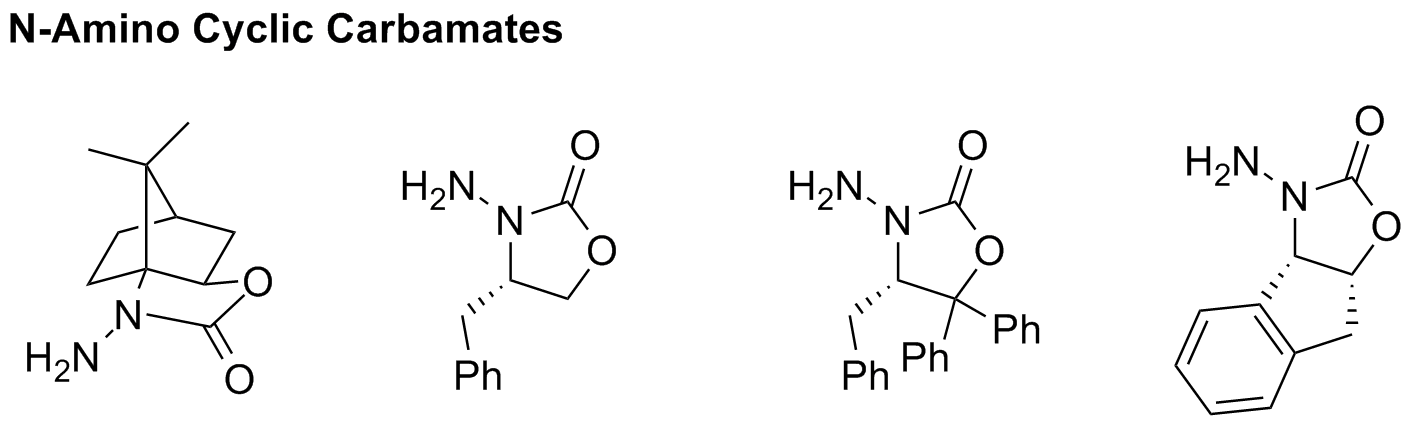
N-Amino cyclic carbamates

== Auxiliary release ==
Hydrazones are usually very stable towards solvolysis, and conversion to the ketone can require vigorous conditions. Also, aldehydic hydrazones often instead disproportionate to a nitrile and amine.

Two principal workup environments are common: oxidation and solvolysis. Reductive conversions are possible with low-valent transition metals, but remained relatively unstudied as of 2000.

Oxidative cleavage has high yields and is most frequently used. Ozone or singlet oxygen can ozonolyze the diazene bond (and any olefinic moieties present), leaving a carbonyl, a nitrosamine, and dioxygen. Lemieux's gentler oxidation tolerates acetals and benzyl ethers. Peroxide reagents (e.g. NaBO_{3}, (tBu_{4}NSO_{4})_{2}, or m-ClBzO_{2}H) cleave the hydrazone with varying speeds, selectivities, and mechanisms, but the Baeyer-Villiger oxidation is a common side-reaction. High-valent transition metal oxyhalides (e.g. WF_{6}, CoF_{3}, MoOCl_{3}) appear to primarily cleave via radicals. All except ozone and singlet oxygen generate nitriles from aldehydic hydrazones, either as the major or a substantial minor product.

Certain electrophiles also elicit nitriles: chloroformates, strongly-activated alkynes, or methyl iodide and a hindered base. Methyl iodide is also useful for hydrolysis: the alkylated hydrazonium iodide easily hydrolyzes to a carbonyl and hydrazoform, and air cleaves the hydrazoform to the hydrazine and carbon dioxide.

Indeed, a wide variety of acids promote hydrolysis. Bismuth trichloride cleaves arbitrary hydrazones in a microwave. Oxalic acid abstracts hydrazine from ketonic hydrazones; the oxalate adduct then decomposes to the original auxiliary in aqueous base. Silica gel hydrolyzes exquisitely acid-sensitive substrates, but is too weak to affect ketonic hydrazones adjacent to a primary carbon. Ketonic hydrazones adjacent to a secondary or tertiary carbon hydrolyze in the presence of catalytic cupric salts; that procedure also preserves substrates disturbed by oxidants or strong acids.

Boron trifluoride etherate catalyzes thioketalization, and Baker's yeast will hydrolyze non-bioactive substrates.

Hydrazone carbamates are cleaved much more readily than their parent hydrazones: para-toluenesulfonic acid affords the corresponding ketones in near-quantitative yields.

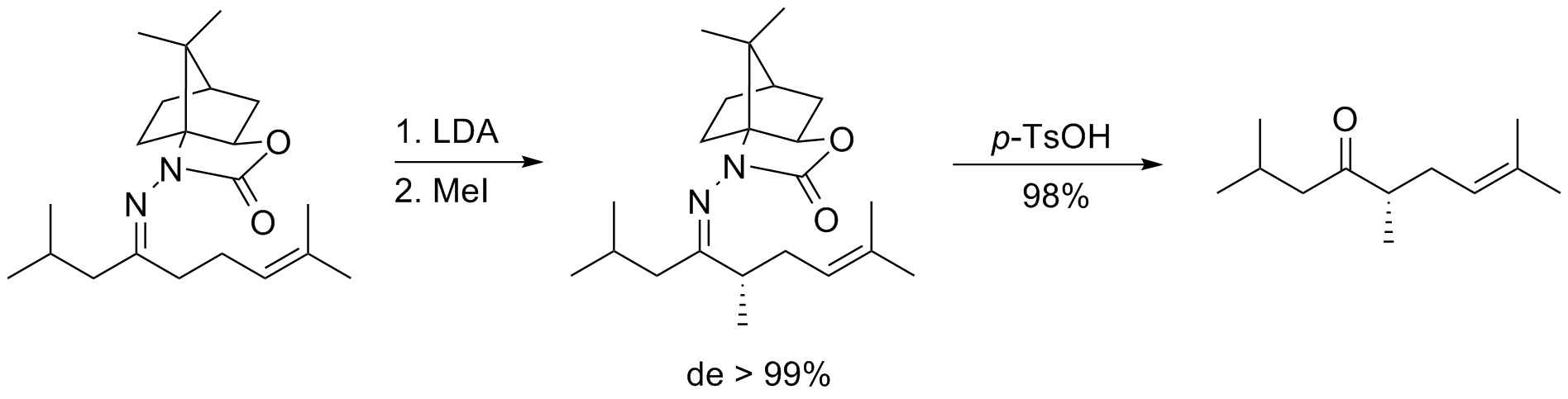

== Conditions ==
Ender's hydrazone alkylation reaction is usually run through a sequence of three steps. The first step should always be the synthesis of the hydrazones. The ketone or aldehyde is mixed with either SAMP or RAMP and allowed to react under argon for 12 hours. The crude hydrazone obtained is purified by distillation or recrystallization. At 0 degree celsius, the hydrazone is transferred into the ether solution of lithium diisopropylamide. Then this mixture is cooled down to -110 degree celsius and is slowly added the alkyl halide. This mixture is then allowed to warm up to room temperature. After 12 hours of reaction at room temperature, the crude alkylated hydrazone is allowed to react with ozone in a Schlenk tube to cleave the C=N bond. After distillation or column chromatography, pure alkylation product can be obtained.

== Applications ==
=== Synthesis of zaragozic acid A ===
K. C. Nicolaou and coworkers at Scripps Research Institute generated the chiral hydrazone through Enders' hydrazone alkylation reaction with high stereoselectivity (de > 95%). The subsequent ozonolysis and Wittig reaction led to the side chain fragment of zaragozic acid A, which is a potent medicine for coronary heart disease.

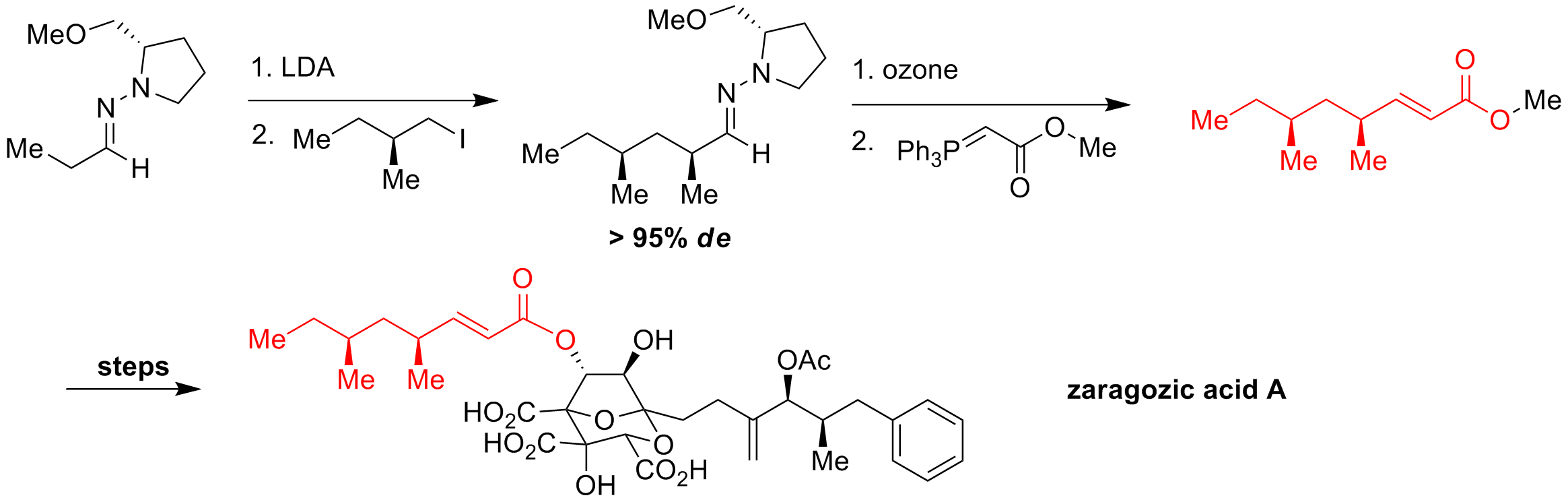
Synthesis of Zaragozic Acid

=== Synthesis of denticulatin A and B ===
Ziegler and coworkers reacted an allyl iodide with the azaenolate to generate a chiral hydrocarbon chain. To avoid loss of the enantiomeric purity of the product, the authors used cupric acetate to regenerate the carbonyl group, obtaining only moderate yield for the cleavage of C=N bond but good enantioselectivity (ee = 89%). The ketone was transformed after several steps into denticulatin A and B - polypropionate metabolites isolated from Siphonaria Denticulata.

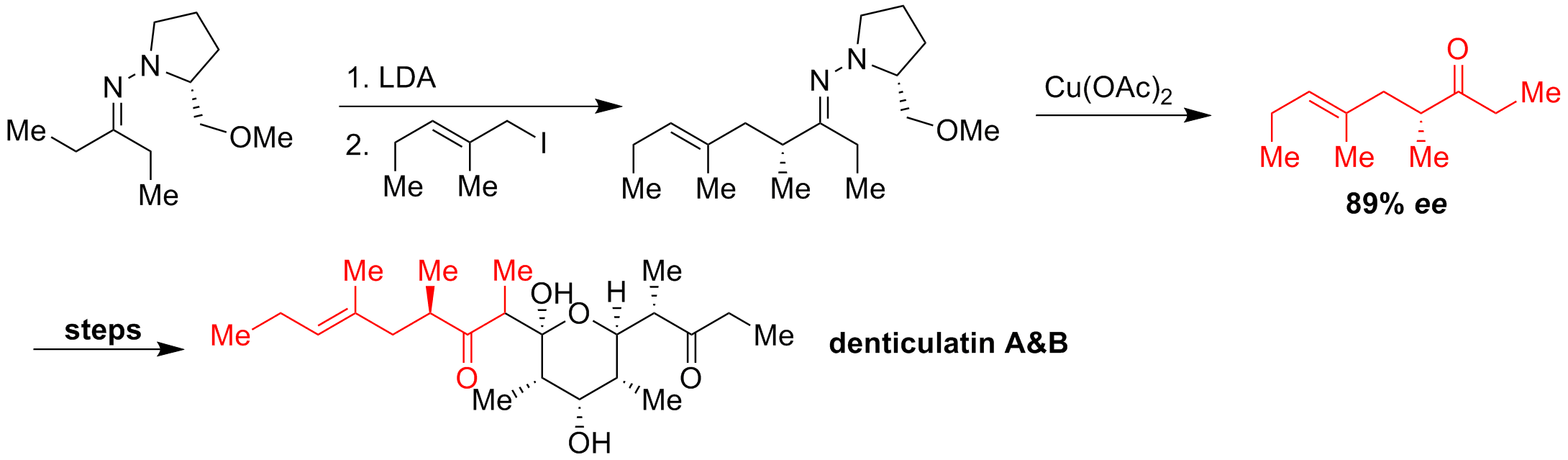
Synthesis of Denticulatin A&B

=== Synthesis of the derivative of arteannuin ===
(-)-C_{10}-demethyl arteannuin B is a structural analog of the antimalarial artemisinin. It exhibits potent antimalarial activity even against a drug-resistant strain. Little and coworkers obtained the alkylated hydrazone in diastereomerically pure form (de > 95%) through the Enders' alkylation reaction. This intermediate was then elaborated into (-)-C_{10}-demethyl arteannuin B.

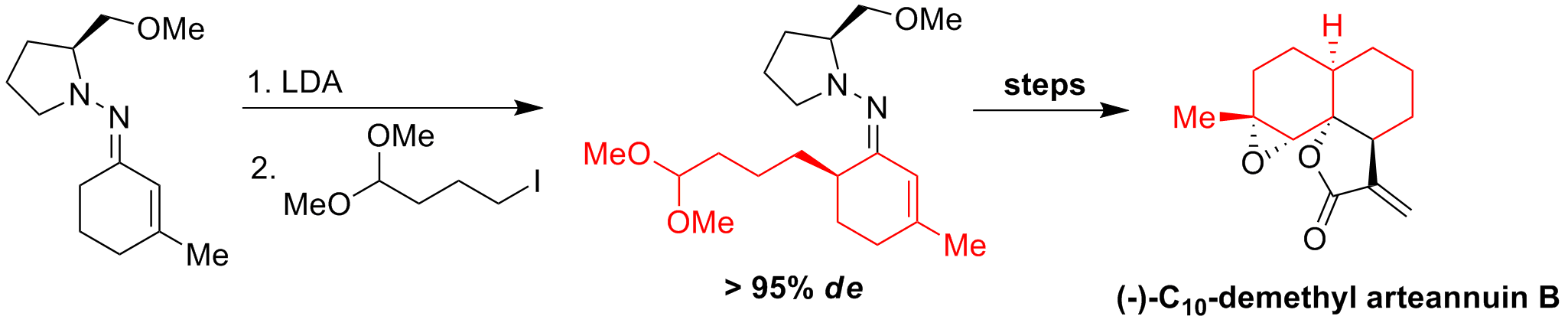
Synthesis of Arteannuin B

=== Synthesis of epothilone A ===
Epothilone A and B are reported to be highly effective anticancer drugs. Several of their structural derivatives show very promising inhibition against breast cancer with only mild side effect and some of them are now under trials. In 1997, K. C. Nicolaou and coworkers reported the first total synthesis of both Epothilone A and B. Ender's alkylation reaction was utilized at the very beginning of the synthesis to install the stereogenic center at C8. The reaction proceeded with both high yield and high diastereoselectivity.

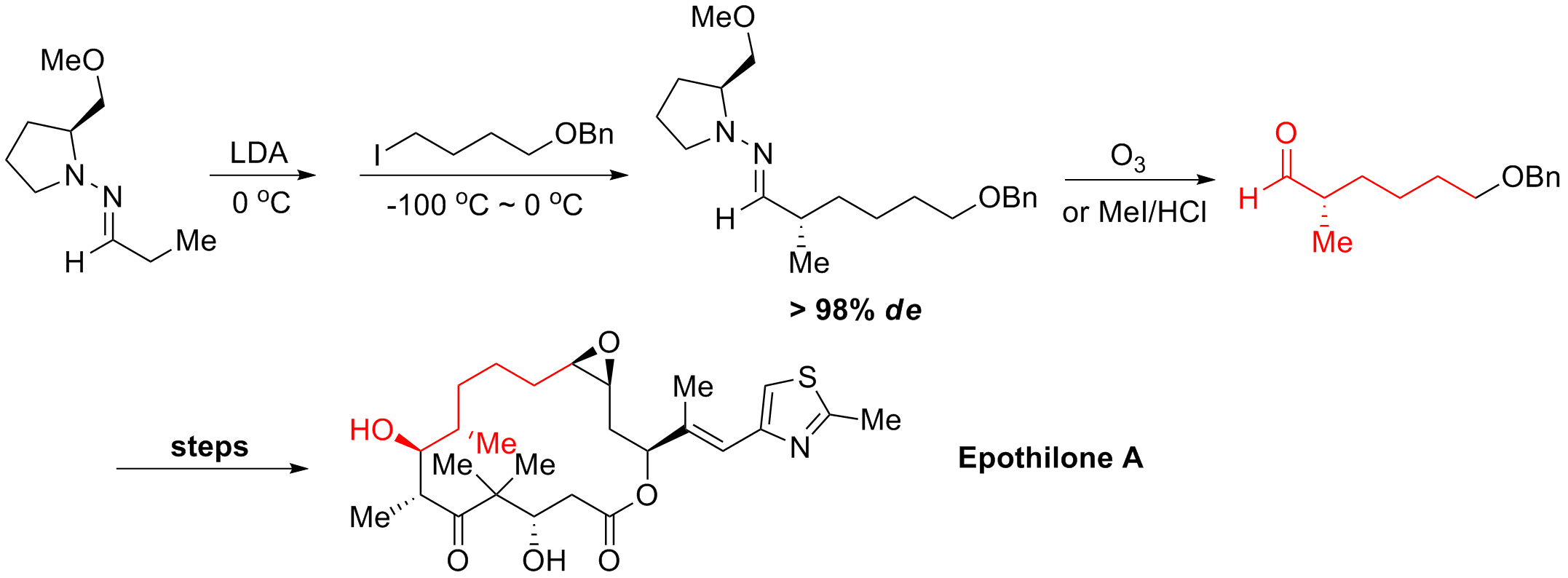
Synthesis of Epothilone A

== See also ==
- Myers' asymmetric alkylation
- Stork enamine alkylation
- Enders' reagents
- Hajos–Parrish–Eder–Sauer–Wiechert reaction
