= Dieter Enders =

German organic chemist (1946–2019)

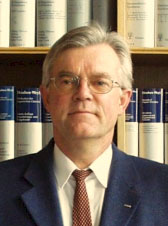
- Born: 17 March 1946
- Died: 29 June 2019 (aged 73)
- Citizenship: Germany
- Education: University of Giessen (PhD)
- Awards: Ryoji Noyori Prize, 2014
- Scientific career
- Fields: Organic Chemistry
- Workplaces: RWTH Aachen
- Doctoral advisor: Dieter Seebach
- Other academic advisors: Elias James Corey

Dieter Enders (17 March 1946 – 29 June 2019) was a German organic chemist who did work developing asymmetric synthesis, in particular using modified prolines as chiral auxiliaries.
The most widely applied of his chiral auxiliaries are the complementary SAMP and RAMP auxiliaries, which allow for asymmetric alpha-alkylation of aldehydes and ketones. In 1974 he obtained his doctorate from the University of Gießen studying under Dieter Seebach and followed this with a postdoc at Harvard University studying with Elias James Corey. He then moved back to Gießen to obtain his Habilitation in 1979, whereupon he became a lecturer, soon obtaining Professorship in 1980 as Professor of Organic Chemistry at Bonn. In 1985 he moved to Aachen, where he was Full Professor of Organic Chemistry and Director. He was editor-in-chief of Synthesis and was on the advisory boards of many other journals including Letters in Organic Chemistry and SynLett.

During his career he won many awards, including:

- 1993 Gottfried Wilhelm Leibniz Prize of the Deutsche Forschungsgemeinschaft
- 1995 Yamada Award, Japan
- 2000 Max-Planck-Forschungspreis for Chemistry
- 2002 Emil-Fischer-Medaille of the GDCh
- 2014 Ryoji Noyori Prize, Japan
