= Wichterle =

Wichterle could mean:

- Otto Wichterle, Czech chemist and inventor, best known for his invention of soft contact lenses.
  - The Wichterle reaction, a chemical reaction invented by Otto Wichterle.
  - 3899 Wichterle, an asteroid named after Otto Wichterle.
