= Bill Rapson =

New Zealand and South African organic chemist (1912–1999)

William Sage Rapson
- Born: 14 August 1912; Kaihu, Northland, New Zealand
- Died: 25 June 1999 (aged 86)
- Education: Auckland University College; University of Oxford
- Known for: Rapson-Robinson synthesis
- Spouse: Joyce Rachel Abey (married 1937, died 1996)
- Scientific career
- Fields: Chemistry
- Workplaces: Auckland University College; University of Oxford; University of Cape Town; CSIR
- Doctoral advisor: Robert Robinson

William Sage Rapson (14 August 1912 – 25 June 1999) was a New Zealand and South African chemist. His initial career was in organic chemistry but he moved into inorganic chemistry with particular emphasis on gold. His research interests ranged from fish oil through coal liquefaction to X-ray diffraction.

== Early life and education ==
Rapson was one of seven children raised on a small farm in Kaihu, New Zealand. He attended Mount Albert Grammar School where he was a Rawlings Scholar and later Senior National Scholar. He then went on to Auckland University College as a Junior University Scholar, Senior University Scholar, Duffus Lubecki Scholar and lastly Sir George Grey Scholar. He attained his master's degree at the age of 20 and in 1933 he became lecturer in chemistry at the University College.

In 1934 he went to Oxford to study organic chemistry with Robert Robinson. He developed the Rapson-Robinson synthesis, while completing his thesis in 1935 at the age of 23. He was then appointed lecturer in organic chemistry at the University of Cape Town (1935–41).

== Research ==
In 1946 he became professor designate of Chemistry after having been a Senior Lecturer. He did pioneering work on fruit and fish resource of the Western Cape region which became the foundation for South Africa's fish oil industry. He also researched coal liquefaction and collaborated with physicists at the University of Cape Town on the development of X-ray diffraction.

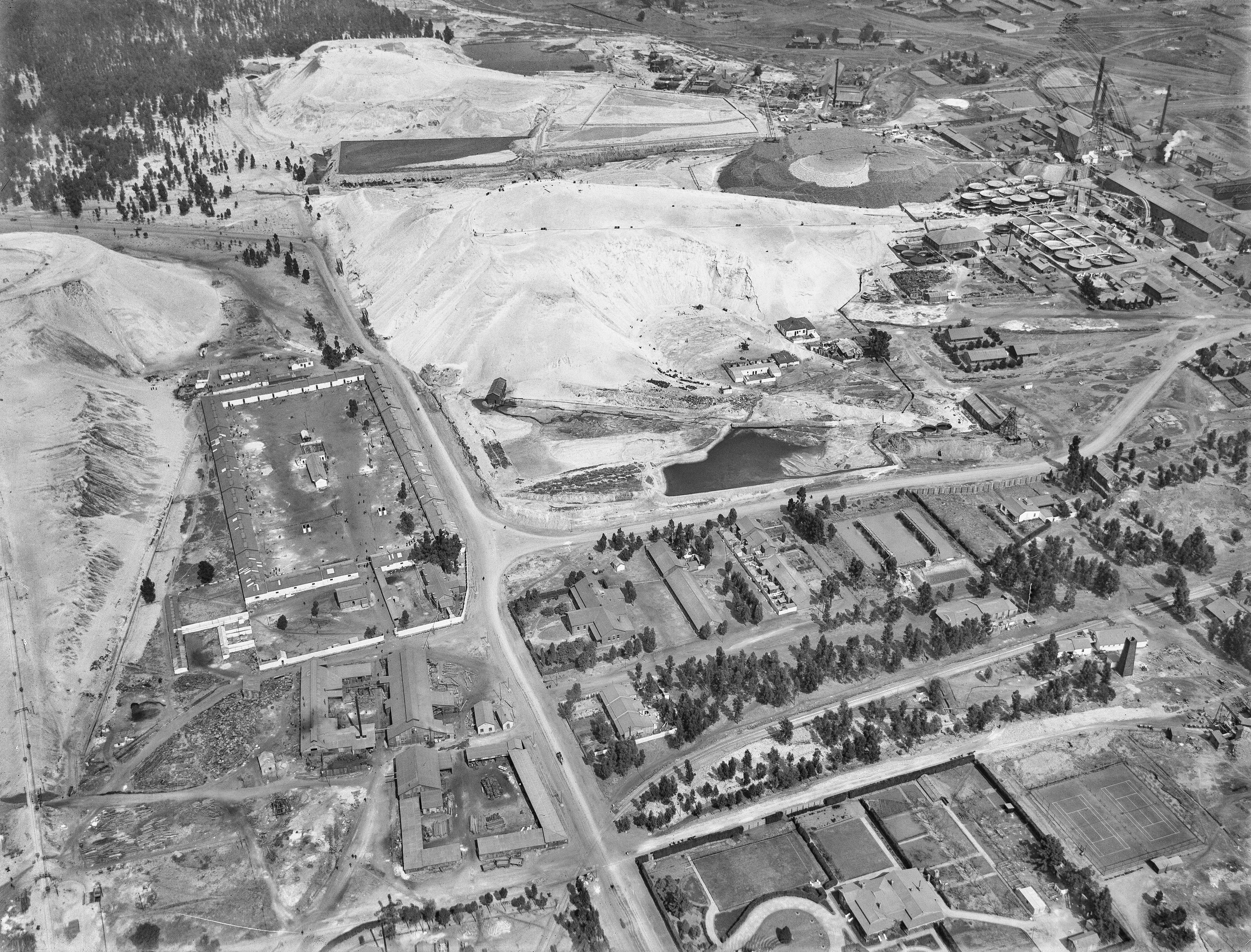
Aerial view of mine tailings dumps

He was the first director of the National Chemical Research Laboratory of the Council for Scientific and Industrial Research (CSIR) in Pretoria. His research areas included South African water and mineral resources. In particular, deacidification and desalination methods for waste dumps and rivers. He identified a type of grass that would grow in the acidic sand of gold mine tailings dumps around Johannesburg to assist with preventing the sand from polluting the nearby rivers.

In 1958 he was promoted to vice-president of CSIR. He was then appointed Research Advisor to the Transvaal and Orange Free State Chamber of Mines, with the aim of improving production and reducing waste. His research, in collaboration with T. Groenewald was published in the journals Gold Bulletin and Gold Technology. In 1978 Rapson and Groenewald co-authored the book Gold Usage, the first textbook on gold to be published since Die Edelmetalle und Ihre Legierungen by E. Raub (1940). Rapson later went on to translate Die Edelmetalle und Ihre Legierungen into English but that version was only published after his death.

== Private life ==
In 1937 Rapson married Joyce Rachel Abey, who had been permanently disabled in a motorcycle accident prior to them meeting. They had two daughters. She died in 1996. Rapson died in 1999.

== Selected works ==
- Rapson, William Sage; Robinson, Robert (1935). "307. Experiments on the synthesis of substances related to the sterols. Part II. A new general method for the synthesis of substituted cyclohexenones". Journal of the Chemical Society (Resumed): 1285. doi:10.1039/JR9350001285.
- Rapson, W. S. and Groenewald, T. (1978) Gold Usage. Academic Press. ISBN 0-12-581250-7.

== Sources ==
- Austin, Brian (2001) Schonland – Scientist and Soldier, IOPP, Bristol, ISBN 0-7503-0501-0
