= Enamine =

Class of chemical compounds

The general structure of an enamine

An enamine is a functional group with the formula R_{2}N−C(R′)=CR″_{2}. Enamines are reagents used in organic synthesis and are intermediates in some enzyme-catalyzed reactions.

The word "enamine" is derived from the affix en-, used as the suffix of alkene, and the root amine. This can be compared with enol, which is a functional group containing both alkene (en-) and alcohol (-ol). Enamines are nitrogen analogs of enols.

Enamines are both good nucleophiles and good bases. Their behavior as carbon-based nucleophiles is explained with reference to the following resonance structures.

Resonance structures for an enamine

== Formation ==
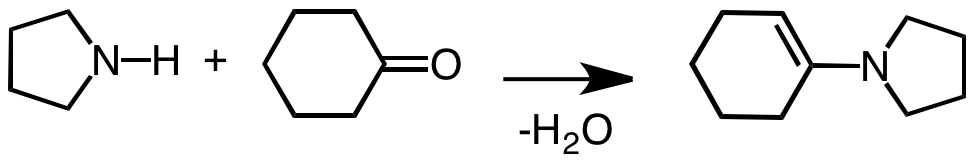
Condensation to give an enamine.

Enamines can be easily produced from commercially available starting reagents. Commonly enamines are produced by condensation of secondary amines with ketones and aldehydes. The condensing ketone and aldehyde must contain an α-hydrogen. The associated equations for enamine formation follow:

R_{2}NH + R'CH_{2}CHO ⇌ R_{2}NC(OH)(H)CH_{2}R' (carbonolamine formation)
R_{2}NC(OH)(H)CH_{2}R' ⇌ R_{2}NCH=CHR' + H_{2}O (enamine formation)

In some cases, acid-catalysts are employed. Acid catalysis is not always required, if the pK_{aH} of the reacting amine is sufficiently high (for example, pyrrolidine, which has a pK_{aH} of 11.26). If the pK_{aH} of the reacting amine is low, however, then acid catalysis is required through both the addition and the dehydration steps. Common dehydrating agents include MgSO_{4} and Na_{2}SO_{4}.

Methyl ketone self-condensation is a side-reaction which can be avoided through the addition of TiCl_{4} into the reaction mixture (to act as a water scavenger).

Primary amines are usually not used for enamine synthesis. Instead, such reactions give imines:

RNH_{2} + R'CH_{2}CHO ⇌ R(H)NC(OH)(H)CH_{2}R' (carbonolamine formation)
R(H)NC(OH)(H)CH_{2}R' ⇌ RN=C(H)CH_{2}R' + H_{2}O (imine formation)

Imines are tautomers of enamines. The enamine-imine tautomerism is analogous to the keto-enol tautomerism.

Protonation of enamines occurs at nitrogen to give enammonium salts, which have been isolated at low temperatures. These salts tend to rearrange to iminium salts:

R_{2}C=CH−NR'_{2} + H^{+} → [R_{2}C=CH−N(H)R'_{2}]^{+}
[R_{2}C=CH−N(H)R'_{2}]^{+} → [R_{2}CH−CH=NR'_{2}]^{+}

== Structure ==
Selected bond distances (picometers) in an enamine. Atoms in red are nearly coplanar.

As shown by X-ray crystallography, the C_{3}NC_{2} portion of enamines is close to planar. This arrangement reflects the sp^{2} hybridization of the C=CN core.

E vs Z geometry affects the reactivity of enamines.

The great majority of enamine literature focuses on tertiary enamines, i.e. those lacking an N-H bond. NH-containing enamines are usually unstable, as indicated by the lability of 2-pyrroline.

== Reactions ==
Enamines are nucleophiles. Ketone enamines are more nucleophilic than their aldehyde counterparts.

Compared to their enolate counterparts, their alkylations often proceed with fewer side reactions. Cyclic ketone enamines follow a reactivity trend where the five membered ring is the most reactive due to its maximally planar conformation at the nitrogen, following the trend 5>8>6>7 (the seven membered ring being the least reactive). This trend has been attributed to the amount of p-character on the nitrogen lone pair orbital - the higher p character corresponding to a greater nucleophilicity because the p-orbital would allow for donation into the alkene π- orbital. Analogously, if the N lone pair participates in stereoelectronic interactions on the amine moiety, the lone pair will pop out of the plane (will pyramidalize) and compromise donation into the adjacent π C-C bond.

=== Alkylation and acylation ===
Alkylation is the predominant reaction sought with enamines. When treated with alkyl halides enamines give the alkylated iminium salts, which then can be hydrolyzes to regenerate a ketone (a starting material in enamine synthesis):

R_{2}N−CH=CHR' + R"X → [R_{2}N^{+}=CH−CHR'R"]X^{−} (alkylation of enamine)
[R_{2}N^{+}=CH−CHR'R"]^{+}X^{−} + H_{2}O → R_{2}NH + R'R"CHCHO (hydrolysis of the resulting iminium salt, giving a 2-alkylated aldehyde)

Owing to the pioneering work by Gilbert Stork, this reaction is sometimes referred to as the Stork enamine alkylation. Analogously, this reaction can be used as an effective means of acylation. A variety of alkylating and acylating agents including benzylic, allylic halides can be used in this reaction.

Similar to their alkylation, enamines can be acylated. Hydrolysis of this acylated imine forms a 1,3-dicarbonyl.

R_{2}N−CH=CHR' + R"COCl → [R_{2}N^{+}=CH−CHR'C(O)R"]Cl^{−} (acylation of enamine)
[R_{2}N^{+}=CH−CHR'C(O)R"]^{+}Cl + H_{2}O → R_{2}NH + O=C(H)CH(R')CR"=O (hydrolysis of the resulting acyl iminium salt, giving a C-acylated aldehyde)

=== Halogenation ===
Chlorination of enamines followed by hydrolysis gives α-halo ketones and aldehydes:

R_{2}NCH=CHR' + Cl_{2} → [R_{2}N^{+}=CH−CHR'CCl]Cl^{−} (chlorination of enamine)
[R_{2}N^{+}=CH−CHR'Cl]Cl^{−} + H_{2}O → R_{2}NH + R'CH(Cl)CHO (hydrolysis of chloroiminium, giving a chloroaldehyde)

In addition to chlorination, bromination and even iodination have been demonstrated.

=== Oxidative coupling ===
Enamines can be efficiently cross-coupled with enol silanes through treatment with ceric ammonium nitrate. Oxidative dimerization of aldehydes in the presence of amines proceeds through the formation of an enamine followed by a final pyrrole formation. This method for symmetric pyrrole synthesis was developed in 2010 by the Jia group, as a valuable new pathway for the synthesis of pyrrole-containing natural products.

=== Annulation ===
Enamines chemistry has been implemented for the purposes of producing a one-pot enantioselective version of the Robinson annulation. The Robinson annulation, published by Robert Robinson in 1935, is a base-catalyzed reaction that combines a ketone and a methyl vinyl ketone (commonly abbreviated to MVK) to form a cyclohexenone fused ring system. This reaction may be catalyzed by proline to proceed through chiral enamine intermediates which allow for good stereoselectivity. This is important, in particular in the field of natural product synthesis, for example, for the synthesis of the Wieland-Miescher ketone – a vital building block for more complex biologically active molecules.

=== Metallation ===
Lithiated enamines, nitrogen analogues to enolates, form by treating imines with strong bases such as LiNR_{2}:

RN=C(CH_{2}R')R + LiN(iPr)_{2} → RN=C(CHLiR')R + HN(iPr)_{2}

These aza enolates are highly nucleophilic at the β carbon. They are alkylated at the β carbon with epoxides and alkyl halides:

RN=C(CHLiR')R + CH_{2}CH_{2}O → RN=C(CH(CH_{2}CH_{2}OLi)R')R
RN=C(CH(CH_{2}CH_{2}OLi)R')R + HX → RN=C(CH(CH_{2}CH_{2}OH)R')R + LiX

That reaction was used in the synthesis of the Oulema melanopus' male aggression pheromone: This sequence of reactions (ketone → imine → azaenolate) has allowed for asymmetric alkylations of ketones through transformation to chiral intermediate metalloenamines.

== Biochemistry ==
Role of iminium and enamines in splitting of fructose 2,6-bisphosphate.

Nature processes (makes and degrades) sugars using enzymes called aldolases. These enzymes act by reversible formation of enamines.

== See also ==
- Enders SAMP/RAMP hydrazone-alkylation reaction
- Hajos–Parrish–Eder–Sauer–Wiechert reaction
- Michael Addition
- Nenitzescu indole synthesis
- Organocatalysis
- Robinson annulation
- Thorpe reaction
- Fluoxymesterone
