= Robinson annulation =

Chemical reaction in organic chemistry

Named after	Robert Robinson
Reaction type	Ring forming reaction

Identifiers
Organic Chemistry Portal	robinson-annulation
RSC ontology ID	RXNO:0000380

The Robinson annulation is a chemical reaction used in organic chemistry for ring formation. It was discovered by Robert Robinson in 1935 as a method to create a six membered ring by forming three new carbon–carbon bonds. The method uses a ketone and a methyl vinyl ketone to form an α,β-unsaturated ketone in a cyclohexane ring by a Michael addition followed by an aldol condensation. This procedure is one of the key methods to form fused ring systems.

Robinson annulation reaction

Formation of cyclohexenone and derivatives are important in chemistry for their application to the synthesis of many natural products and other interesting organic compounds such as antibiotics and steroids. Specifically, the synthesis of cortisone is completed through the use of the Robinson annulation.

The initial paper on the Robinson annulation was published by William Rapson and Robert Robinson while Rapson studied at Oxford with professor Robinson. Before their work, cyclohexenone syntheses were not derived from the α,β-unsaturated ketone component. Initial approaches coupled the methyl vinyl ketone with a naphthol to give a naphtholoxide, but this procedure was not sufficient to form the desired cyclohexenone. This was attributed to unsuitable conditions of the reaction.

Robinson and Rapson found in 1935 that the interaction between cyclohexanone and α,β-unsaturated ketone afforded the desired cyclohexenone. It remains one of the key methods for the construction of six membered ring compounds. Since it is so widely used, there are many aspects of the reaction that have been investigated such as variations of the substrates and reaction conditions as discussed in the scope and variations section. Robert Robinson won the Nobel Prize for Chemistry in 1947 for his contribution to the study of alkaloids.

== Reaction mechanism ==
Arrow pushing for the Robinson annulation between 2-methylcyclohexan-1-one and but-3-en-2-one in the presence of sodium ethoxide as the base

The original procedure of the Robinson annulation begins with the nucleophilic attack of a ketone in a Michael reaction on a vinyl ketone to produce the intermediate Michael adduct. Subsequent aldol type ring closure leads to the keto alcohol, which is then followed by dehydration to produce the annulation product.

In the Michael reaction, the ketone is deprotonated by a base to form an enolate nucleophile which attacks the electron acceptor (in red). This acceptor is generally an α,β-unsaturated ketone, although aldehydes, acid derivatives and similar compounds can work as well (see scope). In the example shown here, regioselectivity is dictated by the formation of the thermodynamic enolate. Alternatively, the regioselectivity is often controlled by using a β-diketone or β-ketoester as the enolate component, since deprotonation at the carbon flanked by the carbonyl groups is strongly favored. The intramolecular aldol condensation then takes place in such a way that installs the six-membered ring. In the final product, the three carbon atoms of the α,β-unsaturated system and the carbon α to its carbonyl group make up the four-carbon bridge of the newly installed ring.

In order to avoid a reaction between the original enolate and the cyclohexenone product, the initial Michael adduct is often isolated first and then cyclized to give the desired octalone in a separate step.

=== Stereochemistry ===
Studies have been completed on the formation of the hydroxy ketones in the Robinson annulation reaction scheme. The trans compound is favored due to antiperiplanar effects of the final aldol condensation in kinetically controlled reactions. It has also been found though that the cyclization can proceed in synclinal orientation. The figure below shows the three possible stereochemical pathways, assuming a chair transition state.

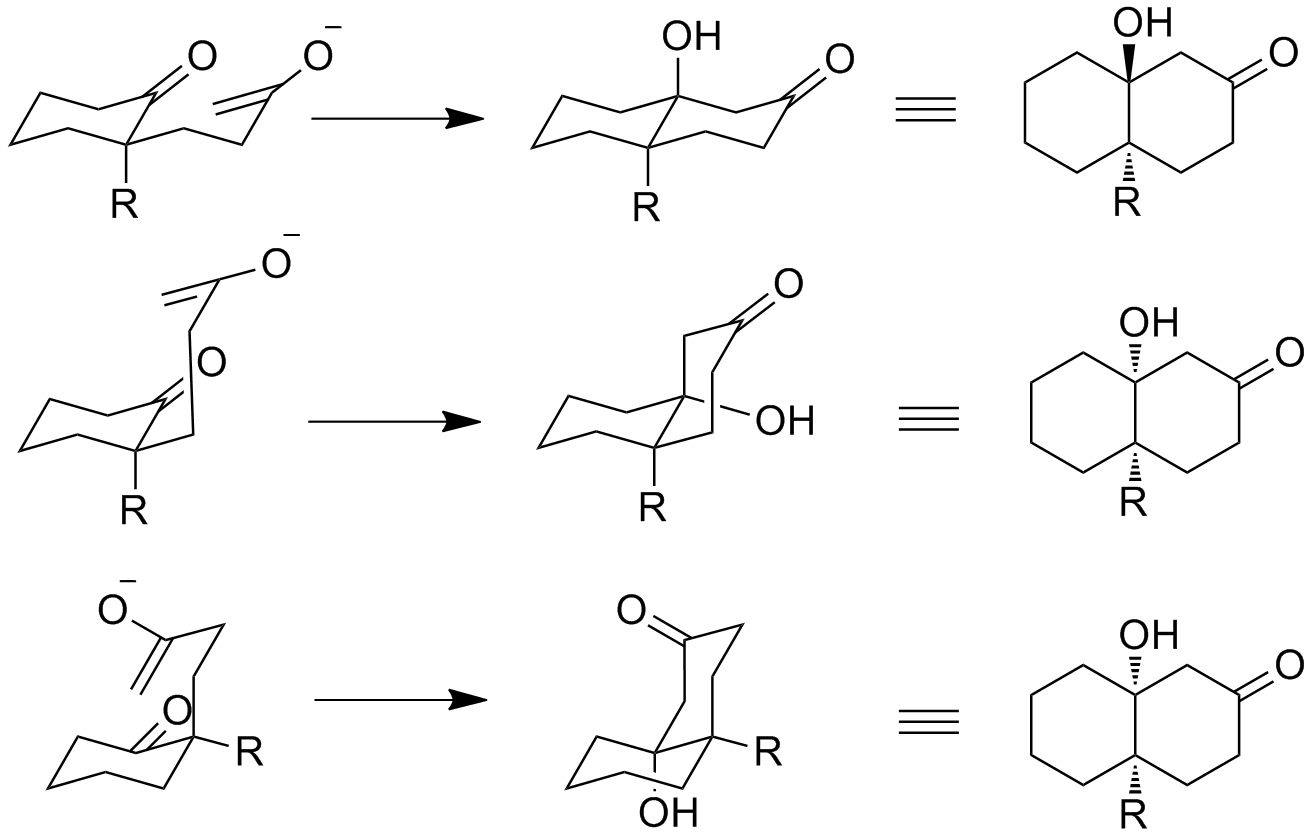
Stereochemical pathways of Robinson annulation

It has been postulated that the difference in the formation of these transition states and their corresponding products is due to solvent interactions. Scanio found that changing the solvent of the reaction from dioxane to DMSO gives different stereochemistry in step D above. This suggests that the presence of protic or aprotic solvents gives rise to different transition states.

=== Mechanistic classification ===
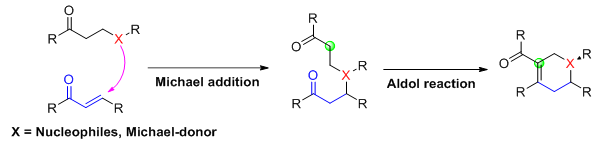
Generalised Tandem Michael-aldol reaction

Robinson annulation is one notable example of a wider class of chemical transformations termed Tandem Michael-aldol reactions, that sequentially combine Michael addition and aldol reaction into a single reaction. As is the case with Robinson annulation, Michael addition usually happens first to tether the two reactants together, then aldol reaction proceeds intramolecularly to generate the ring system in the product. Usually five- or six-membered rings are generated.

== Scope and variations ==
=== Reaction conditions ===
Although the Robinson annulation is generally conducted under basic conditions, reactions have been conducted under a variety of conditions. Heathcock and Ellis report similar results to the base-catalyzed method using sulfuric acid. The Michael reaction can occur under neutral conditions through an enamine. A Mannich base can be heated in the presence of the ketone to produce the Michael adduct. Successful preparation of compounds using the Robinson annulation methods have been reported.

=== The Michael acceptor ===
A typical Michael acceptor is an α,β-unsaturated ketone, although aldehydes and acid derivatives work as well. In addition, Bergmann et al. reports that donors such as nitriles, nitro compounds, sulfones and certain hydrocarbons can be used as acceptors. Overall, Michael acceptors are generally activated olefins such as those shown below where EWG refers to an electron withdrawing group such as cyano, keto, or ester as shown.

Common Michael acceptors

=== Wichterle reaction ===
The Wichterle reaction is a variant of the Robinson annulation that replaces methyl vinyl ketone with 1,3-dichloro-cis-2-butene. This gives an example of using a different Michael acceptor from the typical α,β-unsaturated ketone. The 1,3-dichloro-cis-2-butene is employed to avoid undesirable polymerization or condensation during the Michael addition.

Wichterle reaction

=== Hauser annulation ===
The reaction sequence in the related Hauser annulation is a Michael addition followed by a Dieckmann condensation and finally an elimination. The Dieckmann condensation is a similar ring closing intramolecular chemical reaction of diesters with base to give β-ketoesters. The Hauser donor is an aromatic sulfone or methylene sulfoxide with a carboxylic ester group in the ortho position. The Hauser acceptor is a Michael acceptor. In the original Hauser publication ethyl 2-carboxybenzyl phenyl sulfoxide reacts with pent-3-ene-2-one with LDA as a base in THF at −78 °C.

Hauser annulation

=== Asymmetric Robinson annulation ===
Asymmetric synthesis of Robinson annulation products most often involve the use of a proline catalyst. Studies report the use of L-proline as well as several other chiral amines for use as catalysts during both steps of the Robinson annulation reaction. The advantages of using the optically active proline catalysis is that they are stereoselective with enantiomeric excesses of 60–70%.

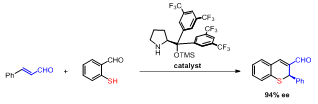
Organocatalytic tandem Michael-aldol reaction for the one-pot synthesis of chiral thiochromenes

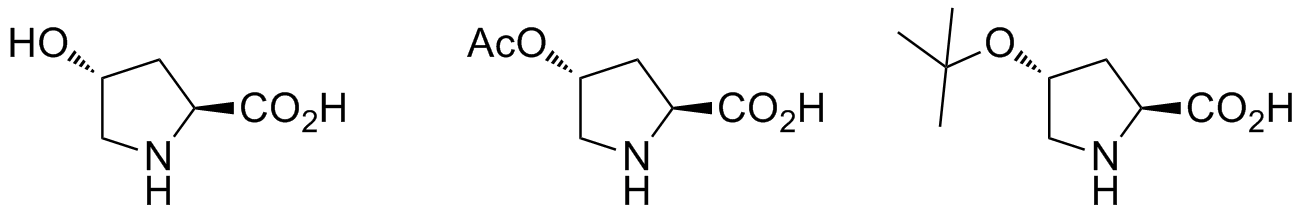
Examples of proline catalysts

Wang, et al. reported the one-pot synthesis of chiral thiochromenes by such an organocatalytic Robinson annulation.

== Applications to synthesis ==
The Wieland–Miescher ketone is the Robinson annulation product of 2-methyl-cyclohexane-1,3-dione and methyl vinyl ketone. This compound is used in the syntheses of many steroids possessing important biological properties and can be made enantiopure using proline catalysis.

Wieland–Miescher ketone

F. Dean Toste and co-workers have used Robinson annulation in the total synthesis of (+)-fawcettimine, a tetracyclic Lycopodium alkaloid that has potential application to inhibiting the acetylcholine esterase.

=== Enantioselective route to platensimycin ===
Platensimycin structure

Scientists at Merck discovered platensimycin, a novel antibiotic lead compound with potential medicinal applications as seen in the adjacent picture.

Initial synthesis gave a racemic form of the compound using an intramolecular etherification reaction of the alcohol motifs and the double bond. Yamamoto and coworkers report the use of an alternative intramolecular Robinson annulation to provide a straightforward enantioselective synthesis of tetracyclic core of platensimycin. The key Robinson annulation step was reported to be accomplished in one pot using L-proline for chiral control. The reaction conditions can be seen below.

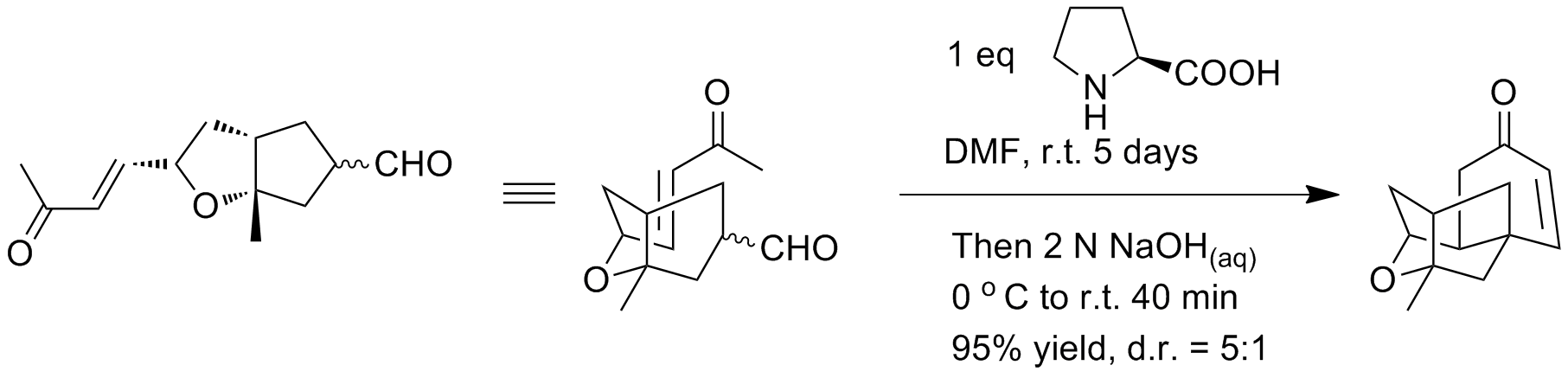
Platensimycin synthesis
