= Letters in Organic Chemistry =

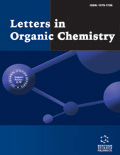
- Discipline: Organic chemistry
- Language: English

Publication details
- History: 2004 to present
- Publisher: Bentham Science (United Arab Emirates)
- Frequency: monthly
- Impact factor: 0.867 (2020)

Standard abbreviations
- ISO 4: Lett. Org. Chem.

Indexing
- CODEN: LOCEC7
- ISSN: 1570-1786 (print); 1875-6255 (web)

Links
- Journal homepage

Letters in Organic Chemistry (usually abbreviated as Lett. Org. Chem.), is a peer-reviewed monthly scientific journal, published since 2004 by Bentham Science Publishers. Letters in Organic Chemistry is indexed in: Chemical Abstracts Service (CAS), EBSCOhost, British Library, PubMed, Web of Science, and Scopus.

Letters in Organic Chemistry publishes letters and articles on all areas related to organic chemistry.

According to the Journal Citation Reports, the impact factor of this journal is 0.867 for the year 2020. The Editor-in-Chief is Alberto Marra (University of Montpellier, France). who took over from Gwilherm Evano (Université libre de Bruxelles, Belgium) who resigned in February 2018 after a strong disagreement with Bentham on the scientific management of this journal.
