= Gilbert Stork =

Organic chemist

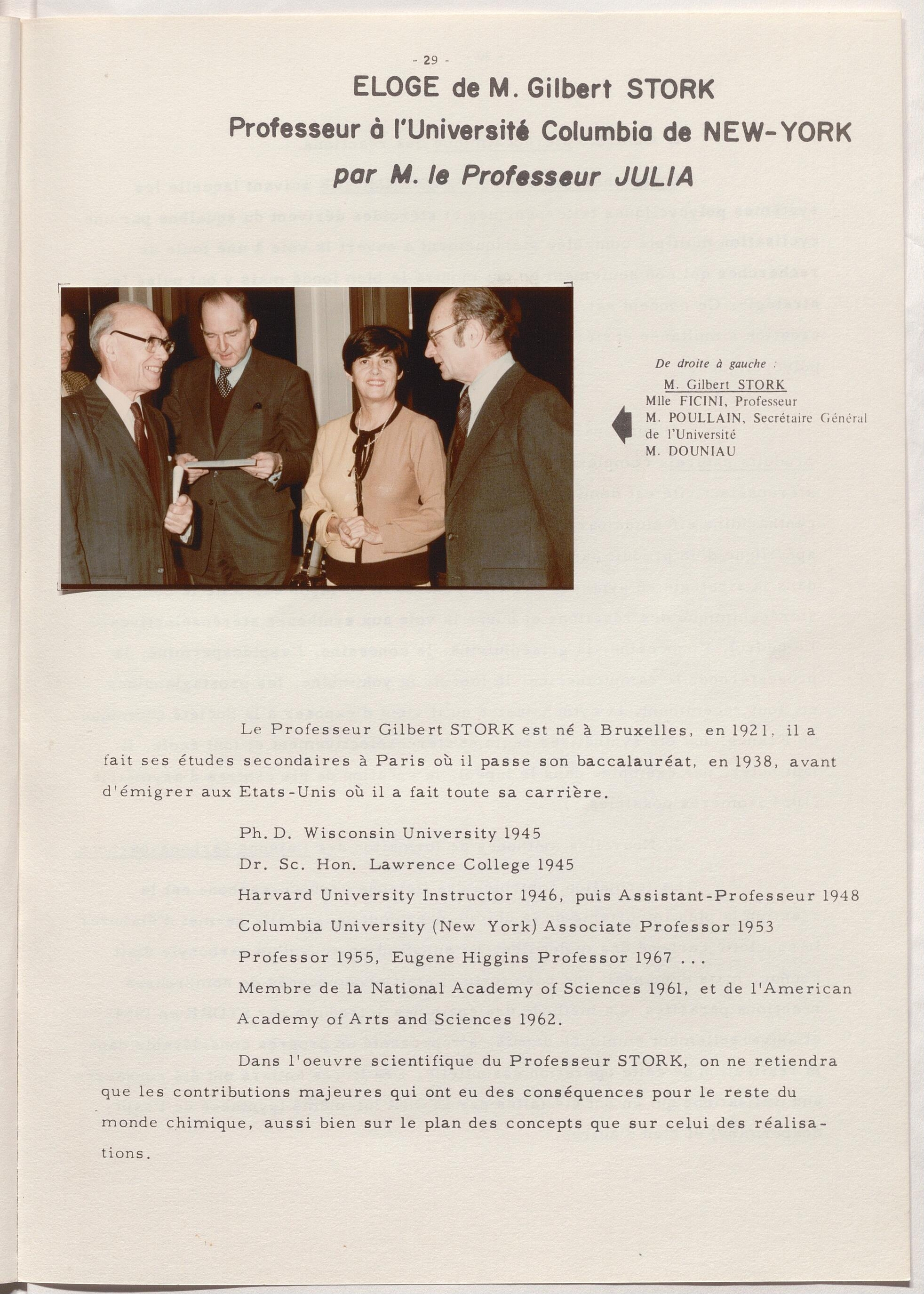
- Gilbert Stork
- Born: 31 December 1921; Brussels, Belgium
- Died: 21 October 2017 (aged 95); New York City, U.S.
- Citizenship: Belgium; United States
- Education: University of Florida (BS); University of Wisconsin–Madison (PhD)
- Awards: ACS Award in Pure Chemistry (1957); William H. Nichols Medal (1980); NAS Award in Chemical Sciences (1982); National Medal of Science (1982); Wolf Prize (1996); The Ryoji Noyori Prize (2003)
- Scientific career
- Fields: Organic chemistry
- Workplaces: Harvard University; Columbia University
- Thesis: The synthesis of 3,4-disubstituted piperidines (1945)
- Doctoral advisor: Samuel M. McElvain
- Notable students: Eugene van Tamelen (1951); John E. McMurry (1967); Paul Grieco (1970); Michael E. Jung (1973); Samuel J. Danishefsky; Adusumilli Srikrishna; Clayton Heathcock (1963‑64); Steven M. Weinreb (1966‑67); Andreas Pfaltz (1978‑79); Eiichi Nakamura (1978‑80); Varinder Aggarwal (1986‑88)

Gilbert Stork (December 31, 1921 – October 21, 2017) was a Belgian-American organic chemist. For a quarter of a century he was the Eugene Higgins Professor of Chemistry Emeritus at Columbia University. He is known for making significant contributions to the total synthesis of natural products, including a lifelong fascination with the synthesis of quinine. In so doing he also made a number of contributions to mechanistic understanding of reactions, and performed pioneering work on enamine chemistry, leading to development of the Stork enamine alkylation. It is believed he was responsible for the first planned stereocontrolled synthesis as well as the first natural product to be synthesised with high stereoselectivity.

Stork was also a mentor of young chemists with many of his students going on to make significant contributions in their own right.

== Early life ==
Gilbert Stork was born in the Ixelles municipality of Brussels, Belgium on December 31, 1921. The oldest of 3 children, his middle brother Michel died in infancy, but he remained close with his younger sister Monique his whole life. His family had Jewish origins, although Gilbert himself didn't recall them being religiously active. The family moved to Nice when Gilbert was about 14 (circa. 1935) and remained there until 1939. During this period, Gilbert completed his lycée studies, distinguishing himself in French literature and writing. Characterizing himself during those years as "not terribly self-confident," and uncertain whether he could find employment in a profession he enjoyed, Gilbert considered applying for a colonial civil service job in French Indochina. However, the outbreak of World War II that year led the family to flee to New York, where his father's older brother, Sylvain, had already emigrated.

== Education ==
Gilbert studied for a Bachelor of Science at the University of Florida, from 1940 to 1942. He then moved to the University of Wisconsin–Madison for this PhD, which he obtained in 1945 under the supervision of Samuel M. McElvain. While at Wisconsin he met Carl Djerassi, with whom he would go on to form a lasting friendship.

== Career ==
- 1946 Harvard University: Instructor; 1948 Assistant Professor
- 1953 Columbia University: Associate Professor; 1955 Professor; 1967–1993 Eugene Higgins Professor; *1993 Professor Emeritus

== Elected to ==
- U.S. National Academy of Sciences, 1961
- American Academy of Arts and Sciences, 1962
- Foreign Member of the French Academy of Sciences, 1989
- American Philosophical Society, 1995
- The Royal Society, UK 1999

== Incidents ==
=== The explosive steak ===
During his time at the University of Wisconsin, Stork kept a steak on his windowsill in the winter in order to keep it refrigerated. The steak began to degrade and to dispose of it Stork put it in a hot acid bath used to clean glassware which contained nitric and sulphuric acids. He was then concerned he would produce nitroglycerine due to the glycerine in the steak and the presence of nitric and sulphuric acids. However, due to the high temperature of the bath, the oxidation of glycerol was much faster than the nitration of glycerin thus preventing the formation of explosives.

== Awarded Honorary Fellowship or membership ==
- Chemists' Club of New York, 1974
- Pharmaceutical Society of Japan, 1973
- Chemical Society of Japan, 2002
- Royal Society of Chemistry, UK, 1983
- Chairman Organic Division of the American Chemical Society, 1966–1967

== Awards ==
Professor Stork received a number of awards and honors including the following:

- 1957 Award in Pure Chemistry of the American Chemical Society
- 1959 Guggenheim Foundation Fellow
- 1961 Baekeland Medal, North Jersey ACS
- 1962 Harrison Howe Award
- 1966 Edward Curtis Franklin Memorial Award, Stanford University
- 1967 ACS Award for Creative Work in Synthetic Organic Chemistry
- 1971 Synthetic Organic Chemical Manufacturers Association Gold Medal
- 1973 Nebraska Award
- 1978 Roussel Prize, Paris
- 1980 Nichols Medal, New York ACS, Arthur C. Cope Award, ACS
- 1982 Edgar Fahs Smith Award, Philadelphia ACS
- 1982 Willard Gibbs Medal, Chicago ACS
- 1982 National Academy of Sciences Award in Chemical Sciences
- 1982 National Medal of Science from Ronald Reagan; Linus Pauling Award
- 1985 Tetrahedron Prize
- 1986 Remsen Award, Maryland ACS
- 1986 Cliff S. Hamilton Award
- 1987 Monie A Ferst Award and Medal, Georgia Tech.
- 1991 Roger Adams Award
- 1992 George Kenner Award, Liverpool
- 1992 Robert Robinson Lectureship, University of Manchester
- 1992 Chemical Pioneer Award, American Institute of Chemists
- 1993 Welch Award in Chemistry, Robert A. Welch Foundation
- 1994 Allan R. Day Award, Philadelphia Organic Chemists Club
- 1995 Wolf Prize, Israel
- 2002 Sir Derek Barton Gold medal, Royal Society of Chemistry
- 2005 Herbert C. Brown Award, American Chemical Society

Stork also held honorary doctorates from Lawrence University, the University of Wisconsin–Madison, the University of Paris, the University of Rochester, and Columbia University.

The inaugural Gilbert Stork Lecture was held in his honor in 2014 at his alma mater, the University of Wisconsin-Madison. Gilbert Stork named lecture series are also held at other institutions, including Columbia University and the University of Pennsylvania, as a result of his endowments.

He was fêted for his sense of humor and colorful personality by historian of chemistry Jeffrey I. Seeman who published a collection of "Storkisms".
