= Stork enamine alkylation =

Reaction sequence in organic chemistry

The Stork enamine alkylation involves the addition of an enamine to a Michael acceptor (e.g., an α,β -unsaturated carbonyl compound) or other electrophile to give an alkylated iminium product, which is hydrolyzed by dilute aqueous acid to give the alkylated ketone or aldehyde. Since enamines are generally produced from ketones or aldehydes, this overall process (known as the Stork enamine synthesis) constitutes a selective monoalkylation of a ketone or aldehyde, a process that may be difficult to achieve directly.

The reaction is named after its inventor, Gilbert Stork (Columbia University).

== Scope ==
The most reliable Stork enamine synthesis adds the enamine to a Michael acceptor:

1. formation of an enamine from a ketone
2. addition of the enamine to an alpha, beta-unsaturated aldehyde or ketone
3. hydrolysis of the enamine back to a ketone

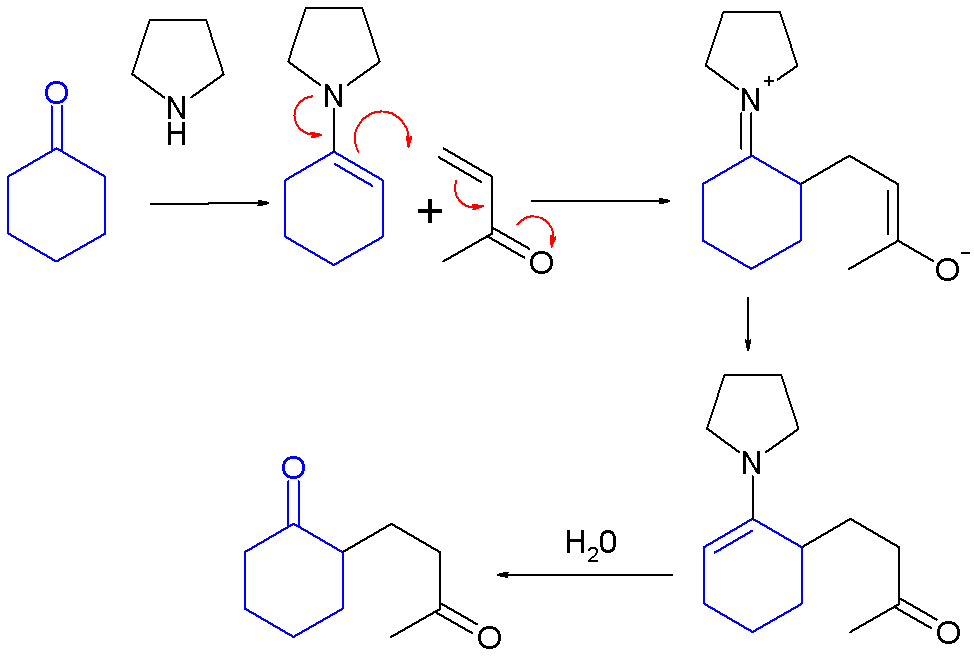
The Stork enamine reaction

However, the reaction applies to a wide variety of electrophiles. Acyl halides result in the formation of 1,3-diketones (Stork acylation); and benzylic, allylic/propargylic, α-carbonyl (e.g., bromoacetone), and α-alkoxy (e.g., methoxymethyl chloride) halides alkylate the enamine.

The mechanism of the Stork reaction is not entirely straightforward. Enamines are stronger nucleophiles at the nitrogen atom, and initially react there before undergoing Hofmann-type rearrangement to the product. Thus methyl and other primary alkyl halides generally only give low to moderate yields of the desired alkylation product.

An anionic enamine, known as an azaenolate or metalloenamine, enables alkylation with less-reactive alkyl halides:

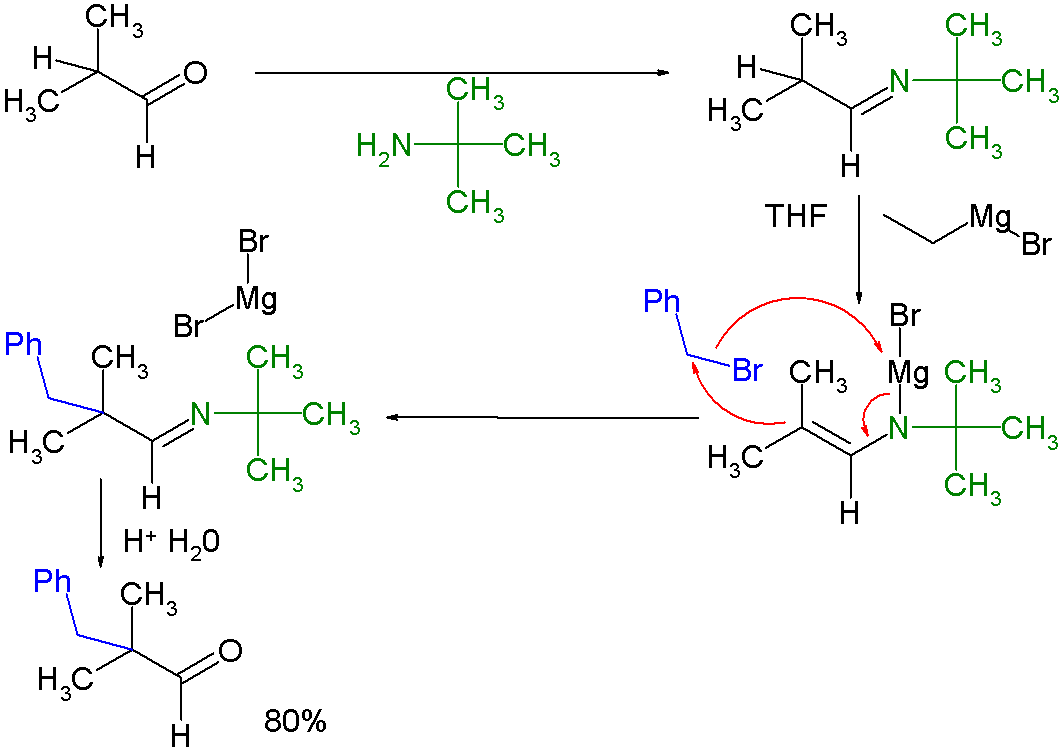
Stork enamine reaction with alkyl halides

In this method a carbonyl compound is condensed to a Schiff base. The imine then reacts with a Grignard reagent to the corresponding Hauser base. The chelating effect of the magnesium ion and the species' negative charge shifts the primary site of nucleophilicity to carbon, and enables displacing a less reactive alkyl halide. Hydrolysis then yields the alkylated ketone.

In the Enders SAMP/RAMP hydrazone-alkylation reaction, a hydrazone replaces the amine for enantioselection.
