= Cyclohexenone =

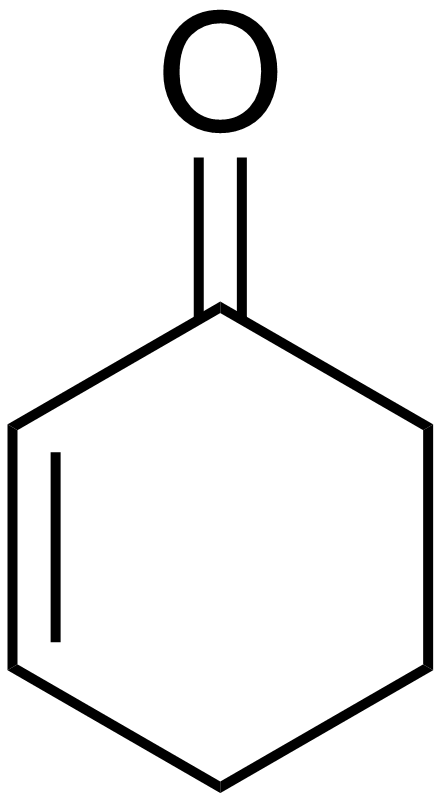

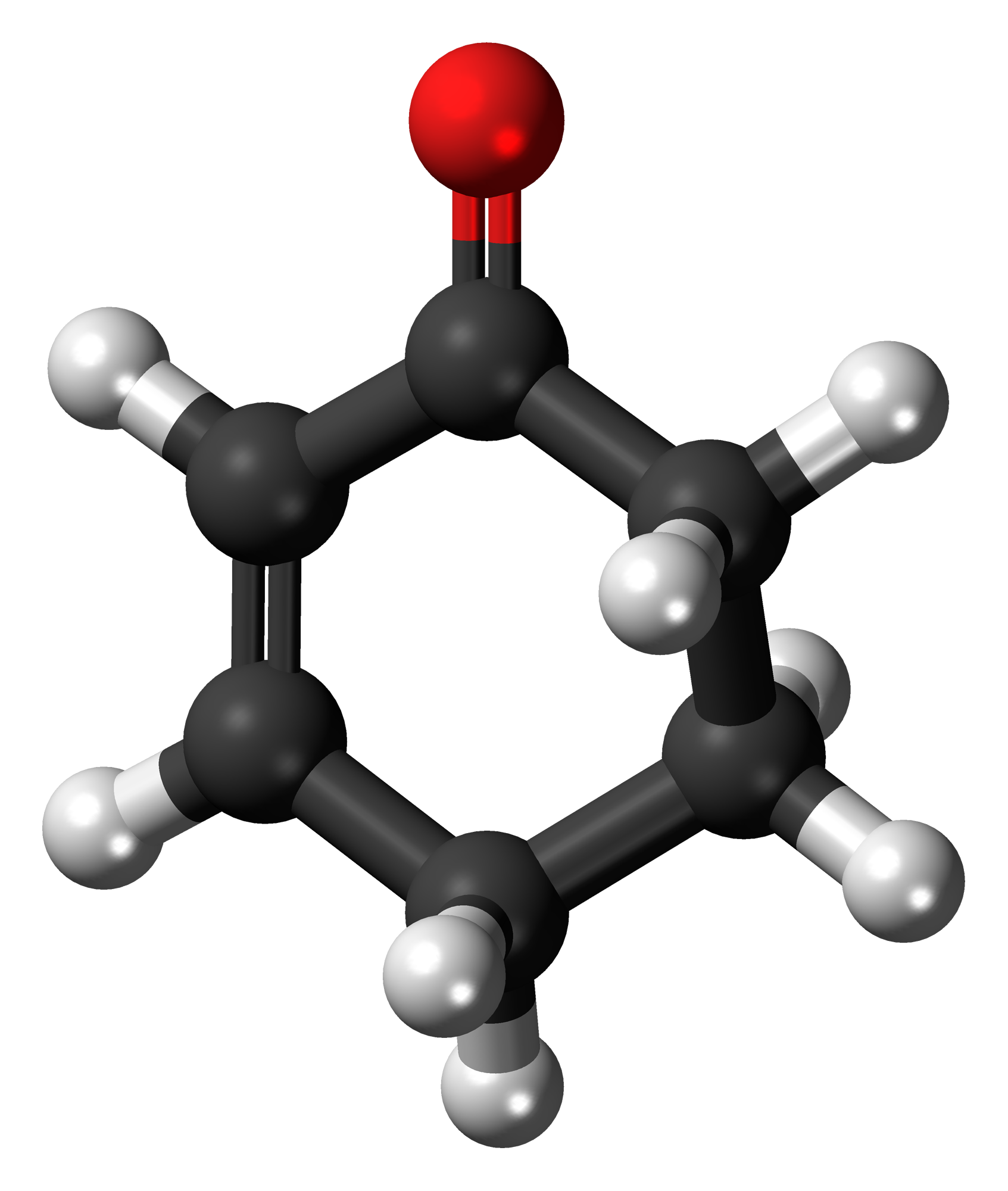

Names
- Preferred IUPAC name Cyclohex-2-en-1-one
- Other names 1-Cyclohex-2-enone

Identifiers
| CAS Number | 930-68-7 |
| 3D model (JSmol) | Interactive image |
| Beilstein Reference | 1280477 |
| ChEBI | CHEBI:15977 |
| ChemSpider | 13005 |
| ECHA InfoCard | 100.012.021 |
| EC Number | 213-223-5 |
| Gmelin Reference | 2792 |
| KEGG | C02395 |
| PubChem CID | 13594 |
| UNII | 445160R1U6 |
| CompTox Dashboard (EPA) | DTXSID1024881 |
- InChI: InChI=1S/C6H8O/c7-6-4-2-1-3-5-6/h2,4H,1,3,5H2 Key: FWFSEYBSWVRWGL-UHFFFAOYSA-N; InChI=1/C6H8O/c7-6-4-2-1-3-5-6/h2,4H,1,3,5H2 Key: FWFSEYBSWVRWGL-UHFFFAOYAT
- SMILES: C1CC=CC(=O)C1

Properties
| Chemical formula | C_{6}H_{8}O |
| Molar mass | 96.129 g·mol^{−1} |
| Appearance | Clear colorless liquid |
| Density | 0.993 g/mL |
| Melting point | −53 °C (−63 °F; 220 K) |
| Boiling point | 171 to 173 °C (340 to 343 °F; 444 to 446 K) |
| Solubility in water | 41.3 g/L (25 °C) |

Hazards
- GHS labelling
| Pictograms | (GHS02: Flammable) (GHS06: Toxic) (GHS07: Exclamation mark) |
| Signal word | Danger |
| Hazard statements | H226, H301, H310, H319, H330, H331 |
| Precautionary statements | P210, P233, P240, P241, P242, P243, P260, P262, P264, P270, P271, P280, P284, P301+P310, P302+P350, P303+P361+P353, P304+P340, P305+P351+P338, P310, P311, P320, P321, P330, P337+P313, P361, P363, P370+P378, P403+P233, P403+P235, P405, P501 |
| NFPA 704 (fire diamond) | 1 3 0 |
- Lethal dose or concentration (LD, LC)
| LD_{50} (median dose) | 220 mg kg^{−1} (rat, oral) |
- Except where otherwise noted, data are given for materials in their standard state (at 25 °C [77 °F], 100 kPa). verify (what is ?) Infobox references

Cyclohexenone is an organic compound which is a versatile intermediate used in the synthesis of a variety of chemical products such as pharmaceuticals and fragrances. It is colorless liquid, but commercial samples are often yellow.

Industrially, cyclohexenone is prepared from phenol by Birch reduction.

Cyclohexenone is a ketone, or more precisely an enone. Common reactions include nucleophilic conjugate addition with organocopper reagents, Michael reactions and Robinson annulations.

== Synthesis ==
Several routes exist for the production of cyclohexenone. For the laboratory scale, it can be produced from resorcinol via 1,3-cyclohexanedione.

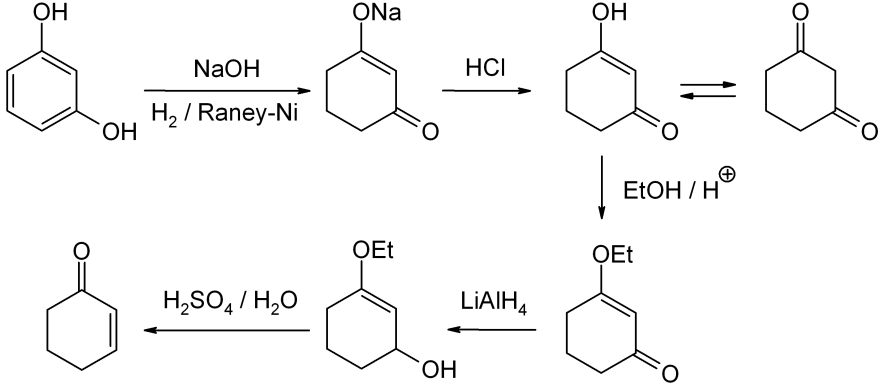

Cyclohexenone is obtained by Birch reduction of anisole followed by acid hydrolysis.

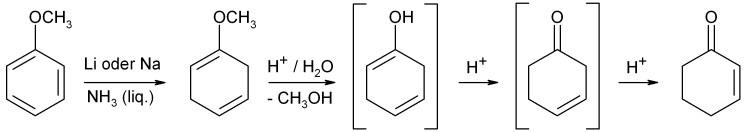

It can be obtained from cyclohexanone by α-bromination followed by treatment with base. Hydrolysis of 3-chloro cyclohexene followed by oxidation of the cyclohexenol is yet another route.

Cyclohexenone is produced industrially by catalytic oxidation of cyclohexene, for example with hydrogen peroxide and vanadium catalysts. Several patents describe diverse oxidizing agents and catalysts.

== Reactions ==
Cyclohexenone is a widely used building block in organic synthesis chemistry, as it offers many different ways to extend molecular frameworks.

As an enone, cyclohexenone is easily adapted to Michael addition with nucleophiles (such as enolates or silyl enol ethers) or, it could be employed by a Diels-Alder reaction with electron-rich dienes. Furthermore, this compound reacts with organocopper compounds from 1,4-addition (Michael addition), or with Grignard reagents 1,2-addition, i.e., with attack of the nucleophile at the carbonyl carbon atom. Cyclohexenone is also used in multi-step synthesis in the construction of polycyclic natural products. It is prochiral.

With strong bases, the positions 4 and 6 (the two CH_{2}-groups of the carbonyl group and the C-C double bond adjacent) are deprotonated.

Cyclohexenone is an in-vitro catalyst for a relatively mild decarboxylation of alpha amino acids. Researchers in Japan were attempting to use t-butyl peroxide as a catalyst for decarboxylation using a solvent choice of cyclohexanol. Curiously they found that when they used lower-purity (e.g. technical grade, 98%) cyclohexanol, the reaction proceeded as much as 4 times faster compared to when they used relatively pure cyclohexanol (>99.3%). They found that cyclohexanol contained cyclohexenone as a natural impurity, which was three times more abundant in the technical grade cyclohexenone compared to the more purified cyclohexanol (~0.3% versus ~0.1%). Further research showed that 1% cyclohexenone in cyclohexanol will decarboxylate most alpha-amino acids, including non-standard ones, with a yield of 80-95% in a matter of several hours. The exceptions are certain amino acids like histidine, which was reported to take over 26 hours, and poly-amino acids, which fail to decarboxylate using 2-cyclohexenone and another route must be found instead.

== Related compounds ==
- cyclopropenone
- cyclobutenone
- cyclopentenone
- cycloheptenone
