= Seco (tetrapyrrole) =

Prefix in organic chemistry nomenclature

The prefix seco in tetrapyrrole nomenclature signifies that the macrocyclic ring of a porphyrin, chlorophyll, or corrin is opened at the specified position to the corresponding acyclic (linear) tetrapyrrole. This nomenclature reflects chemical reactions involving respective ring openings and ring closures.

== Seco-tetrapyrroles as products of biological and chemical degradation ==
Linear tetrapyrroles originating from natural chlorophyll breakdown during plant senescence, known only since the 1990s, were first named as 4,5-seco-phytoporphyrins, since about 2014 as phyllobilins, with this systematic name expressing their origin from chlorophyll and their structural relation to bile pigments (fig. 1).

Chemical ring cleavage of cyclic tetrapyrroles also produces seco-derivatives, as in the photooxygenolysis of vitamin B_{12} (fig. 2).

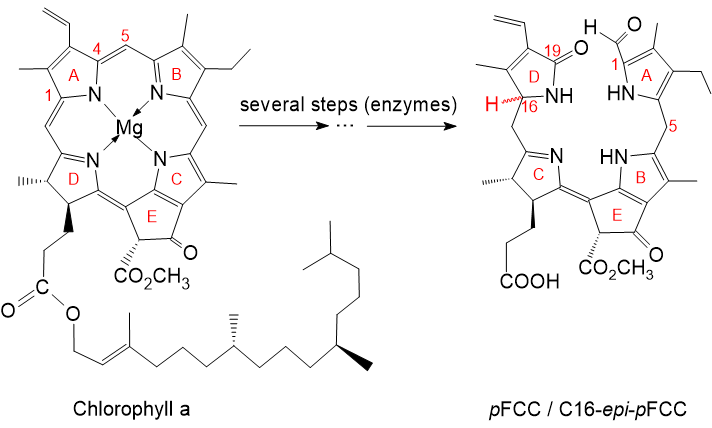
Figure 1. First isolable linear tetrapyrrolic product of chlorophyll breakdown in plants: pFCC (primary fluorescent chlorophyll catabolite), a 4,5-seco-phytoporphyrin, named and numbered as a linear tetrapyrrole (a type-I phyllobilin), i.e., differently from porphinoids

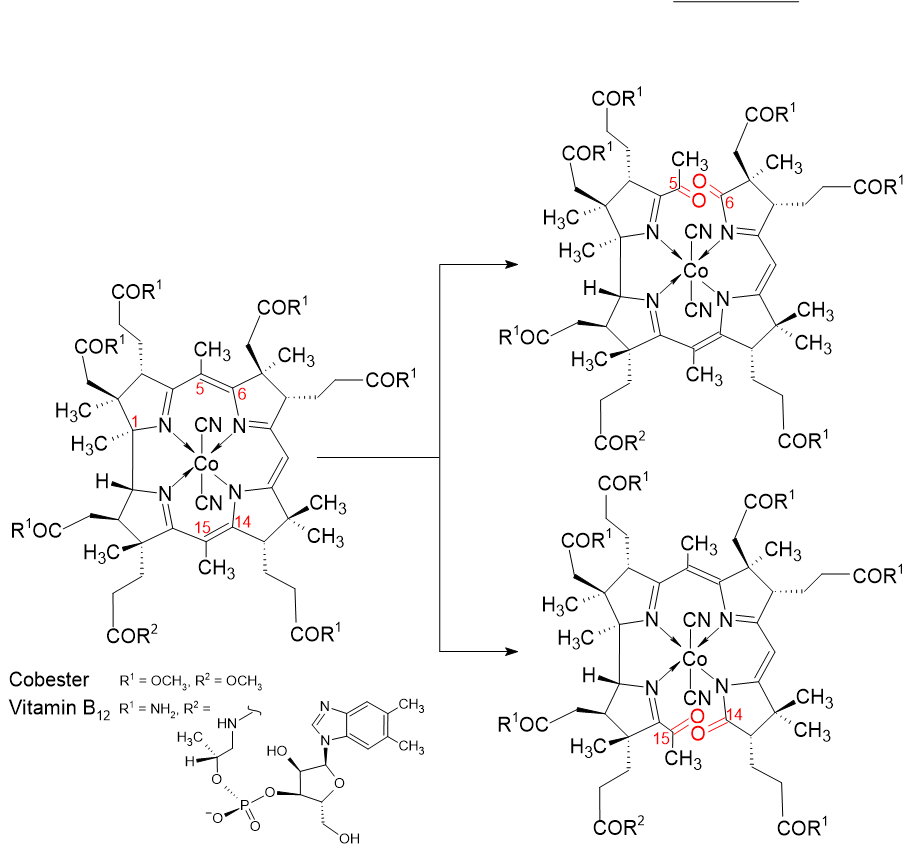
Figure 2. Photooxygenolysis of cobester and vitamin B_{12} to 5,6- and 14,15-seco-corrins

== Seco-corrins in corrin syntheses ==
In the Harvard (Woodward)/ETH (Eschenmoser) variant of the two total syntheses of vitamin B_{12}, the corrin macrocyle is built by coupling an A/D- (Harvard) and a B/C (ETH) component, first at meso-C-15 between rings D and C, followed by ring closure of the resulting seco-corrin at C-5, using the Eschenmoser sulfide contraction developed at ETH for both coupling reactions (fig. 3).

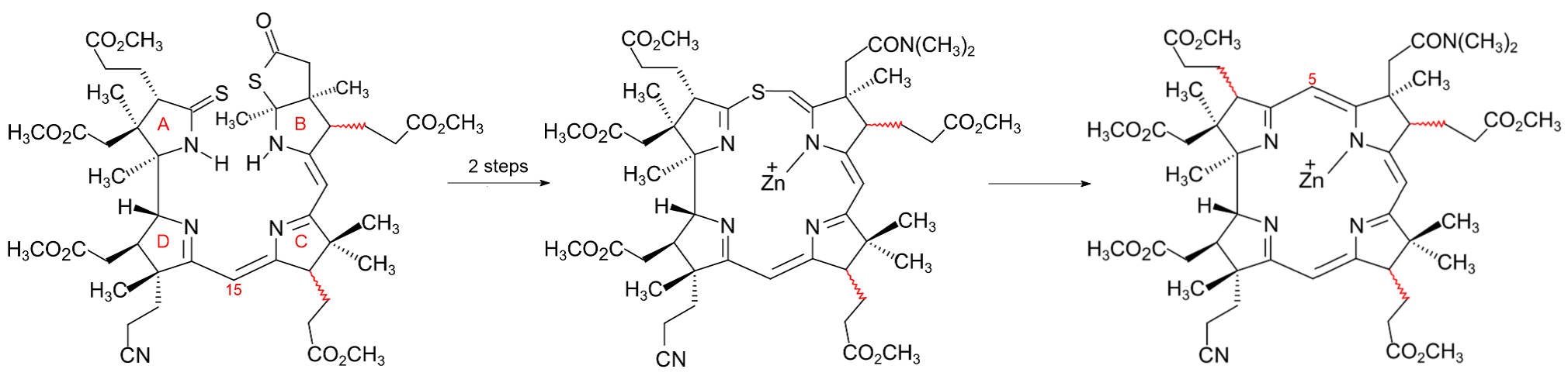
Figure 3. Corrins from seco-corrins via A/B ring closure by Eschenmoser sulfide contraction: important step in the Harvard/ETH variant of the total syntheses of vitamin B_{12}

Figure 4. Corrin from A/D-seco-corrin via photochemical A/D ring closure: key step in the ETH variant of the total syntheses of vitamin B_{12}

In the photochemical ETH variant of these total syntheses, the corrin ring is closed directly between rings A and D – as typical for corrins, meso position C20 missing – in an A/D-seco-corrin → corrin cycloisomerization (fig. 4).

Other corrins were synthesized by Eschenmoser et al. from seco-corrins by A/B ring closure via imidoester–enamine C–C condensation, sulfide contraction, or by photochemical A/D cyclization.
