= Vitamin B12 total synthesis =

Industrial synthesis of chemical substance

The total synthesis of vitamin B_{12} (cobalamin) was accomplished in 1972 by two different approaches between the collaborating research groups of Robert Burns Woodward at Harvard and Albert Eschenmoser at ETH. The synthetic endeavor required the effort of 91 postdoctoral researchers (77 from Harvard, 14 from ETH), and 12 PhD students (from ETH) over a period of almost 12 years. The synthesis project induced and involved a major paradigm shift in the field of natural product synthesis.

== The target molecule ==
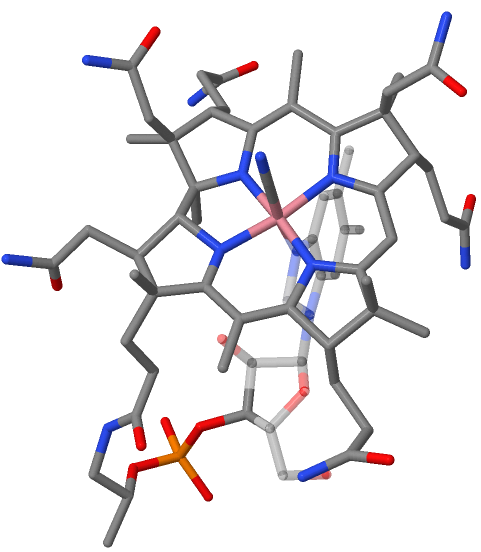
X-ray crystal structure of vitamin B_{12} (cyanocobalamin) hydrate (Hodgkin et al., 1954)

The biomolecule vitamin B_{12} (molecular formula C_{63}H_{88}CoN_{14}O_{14}P), is the most complex of all known vitamins. Its chemical structure was previously elucidated by X-ray crystallography in 1956 by the research group of Dorothy Hodgkin (Oxford), in collaboration with Kenneth N. Trueblood (UCLA) and John G. White (Princeton). At the core of this molecule is the corrin structure, a nitrogenous tetradentate ligand system. (Note: For a review about syntheses of corrins, see; this includes more recent synthetic approaches to vitamin B_{12} by the groups of Stevens, Jacobi, and Mulzer, as well as references to approaches by Todd or Cornforth (see also) preceding the efforts by Eschenmoser and Woodward.) The corrin system is biogenetically related to porphyrins and chlorophylls, yet differs from them structurally. Its carbon skeleton lacks a meso carbon atom “bridge” otherwise linking the five-membered pyrrole-like rings; two of these rings (A and D, Figure 1) are directly fused by a C–C single bond. Lined up along the periphery of the B_{12} corrin ring are eight methyl groups, three propanamide, and three acetamide side chains. The periphery also contains nine stereocenters. The monobasic corrin ligand is equatorially coordinated with a trivalent Co^{3+} cobalt ion, which bears two additional axial ligands. (Note: Formulas in figs. 4 and 6 illustrate the atom, ring, and side chain enumeration in corrins: "Nomenclature of Corrinoids". Pure and Applied Chemistry. 48 (4): 495–502. 1976. doi:10.1351/pac197648040495.) Several natural variants of the B_{12} structure exist that differ in the identity of these axial ligands.

Figure 1 – Ring positions of vitamin B_{12} (left) and cobyric acid structure (right)

In vitamin B_{12} itself, the cobalt is coordinated to a cyano group on the top side of the corrin plane (cyanocobalamin), and a nucleotide loop on the opposite side. This nucleotide loop is connected on its other end to the peripheral propanamide group located at ring D (Figure 1) and consists of structural elements derived from aminopropanol, phosphate, ribose, and 5,6-dimethylbenzimidazole. The imidazole derivative is axially coordinated to the cobalt, closing the loop.

Cobyric acid, one of the natural derivatives of vitamin B_{12}, lacks this nucleotide loop. Depending on the nature of the two axial ligands at the cobalt center, it instead displays propionic acid function at ring D as a carboxylate (as shown in Figure 1), or as the carboxylic acid, in the case of two cyanide ligands at cobalt.

== The two syntheses ==
The structure of vitamin B_{12} was the first low-molecular weight natural product to be determined by X-ray analysis rather than by chemical degradation. As a result, though the structure of this novel type of complex biomolecule was established, its chemistry remained essentially unknown. Exploration of this chemistry became one of the tasks of the vitamin's chemical synthesis. In its time, the synthesis of such an exceptionally complex and unique structure presented a major challenge at the frontier of research in organic natural product synthesis.

Figure 2 – The two ETH corrin model syntheses (Note: The year 1964 refers to the first corrin synthesis of a pentamethylcorrin via A/B-cyclization by iminoester/enamine-C,C-condensation; the heptamethylcorrin shown here (M = Co(CN)_{2}) was prepared by the same ring closure method in 1967.)

Figure 3 – The two approaches to cobyric acid synthesis

In 1960, the research group of biochemist Konrad Bernhauer in Stuttgart had reconstituted vitamin B_{12} from one of its naturally occurring derivatives, cobyric acid. This was achieved by stepwise construction of the vitamin's nucleotide loop. (Note: Friedrich, W.; Gross, G.; Bernhauer, K.; Zeller, P. (1960). "Synthesen auf dem Vitamin-B_{12}-Gebiet. 4. Mitteilung. Partialsynthese von Vitamin B_{12}". Helvetica Chimica Acta. 43 (3): 704–712. doi:10.1002/hlca.19600430314. For recent partial syntheses of vitamin B_{12} and coenzyme B_{12} from cobyric acid, see Widner, Florian J.; Gstrein, Fabian; Kräutler, Bernhard (2017). "Partial Synthesis of Coenzyme B_{12} from Cobyric Acid". Helvetica Chimica Acta. 100 (9) e1700170. doi:10.1002/hlca.201700170.) This particular work amounted to a partial synthesis of vitamin B_{12} from a natural product containing all the structural elements of vitamin B_{12}, except the nucleotide loop. As a result, cobyric acid was chosen as the target molecule for a total synthesis of vitamin B_{12}.

Collaborative work between research groups at Harvard and at ETH resulted in two cobyric acid syntheses (Figure 3), concomitantly accomplished in 1972, one by Harvard and the other by ETH. The described "competitive collaboration" of that size (totaling 103 graduate students and postdoctoral researchers for a time of almost 177 person-years) was then unheard of in the history of organic synthesis. The two syntheses are intricately intertwined chemically, though differ in the way the central macrocyclic corrin ligand system is constructed. Both strategies are patterned after two model corrin syntheses developed at ETH. The first of these syntheses, published in 1964, achieved the construction of the corrin chromophore by combining an A–D component with a B–C component via iminoester/enamine C–C condensations; the final ring closure was attained between rings A and B. The second model synthesis, published in 1969, explored a novel photochemical cycloisomerization process to create the direct A/D ring junction, with final ring closure occurring between rings A and D.

The A/B approach to the cobyric acid syntheses was collaboratively pursued and accomplished in 1972 at Harvard. It combined a bicyclic Harvard A–D component with an ETH B–C component, and closed the macrocyclic corrin ring between rings A and B. The A/D approach to the synthesis, accomplished at ETH and finished at the same time as the Harvard A/B approach, successively adds rings D and A to the B–C component of the A/B approach and attains the corrin ring closure between rings A and D. The paths of the two syntheses met in a common corrinoid intermediate. The final steps from this intermediate to the cobyric acid target were also carried out collaboratively; each group working with material prepared via their own respective approach.

== Synopsis of the Harvard/ETH collaboration ==
=== The beginnings ===
Woodward and Eschenmoser embarked on the project of a chemical synthesis of vitamin B_{12} independently from each other. The ETH group started with a model study on how to synthesize a corrin ligand system in December 1959. In August 1961, the Harvard group began attacking the buildup of the B_{12} structure directly by aiming at the most complex part of the B_{12} molecule, the so-called "western half" that contains the direct junction between rings A and D (the A–D component). By October 1960, the ETH group had commenced the synthesis of a ring B precursor of vitamin B_{12}.

The progress at Harvard was rapid from the start, until an unexpected stereochemical course of a central ring formation step interrupted the project. Woodward's recognition of the stereochemical enigma (which came to light by the irritating behavior of one of his meticulously planned synthetic steps) became, according to his own writings, part of the developments that led to the orbital symmetry rules.

After 1965, the Harvard group continued work towards an A–D component along a modified plan, using (−)-camphor as the source of ring D.

=== Joining forces: the A/B approach to cobyric acid synthesis ===
By 1964, the ETH group had accomplished the first corrin model synthesis, and also the preparation of a ring B precursor as part of a construction of the B_{12} molecule itself. Since the independent progress of the two groups towards their long-term objective was so clearly complementary, Woodward and Eschenmoser decided in 1965 to pursue the project of a B_{12} synthesis collaboratively, planning to utilize the ligand construction (ring coupling of components) strategy of the ETH model system.

By 1966, the ETH group had succeeded in synthesizing the B–C component (the analogous "eastern half") by coupling their ring B precursor to the ring C precursor. This ring C precursor had also been prepared at Harvard from (−)-camphor by employing a strategy conceived and used earlier by A. Pelter and J. W. Cornforth in 1961. (Note: Letter from J. W. Cornforth to A. Eschenmoser, April 16, 1984, see; see also refs.. This preparation of a ring C precursor from (+)-camphor involved 8 steps, compared to 4 steps (Note: See Determination of absolute configuration of (+)-ring-B precursor via its conversion into the (+)-ring-C precursor in (Show/Hide) "Synthesis of the ETH B-C-component (part of the A/B as well as A/D approach)".) from the ETH ring B precursor and used a commonly available precursor instead of "precious" material.) At ETH, the synthesis of the B–C component involved the implementation of the C–C condensation reaction via sulfide contraction. This newly-developed method turned out to provide a general solution to the problem of constructing the characteristic structural elements of the corrin chromophore, the vinylogous amidine systems bridging the four peripheral rings.

Figure 4 – 5,15-Bisnor-corrinoids

Early in 1967, the Harvard group accomplished the synthesis of the model A–D component, (Note: See Synthesis of the A-D-component carrying the propionic acid function at ring D as methoxycarbonyl group (model A-D-component) in (Show/Hide) "The Harvard synthesis of the A-D-components for the A/B approach".) with the side chain "f" (Figure 4) undifferentiated, bearing a methyl ester like all the other side chains. From then on, the two groups systematically exchanged samples of their respective halves of the corrinoid target structure. By 1970, they had collaboratively connected Harvard's undifferentiated A–D component with ETH's B–C component, producing dicyano-cobalt(III)-5,15-bisnor-heptamethyl-cobyrinate (1, Figure 4). This synthetic corrinoid intermediate was identified by the ETH group via direct comparison with a sample produced from natural vitamin B_{12}.

In this advanced model study, reaction conditions for the demanding processes of the C/D coupling and the A/B cyclization via sulfide contraction method were established. The reaction conditions for the C/D coupling were successfully explored in both laboratories, with the superior conditions being found at Harvard. The ideal reaction conditions for the A/B ring closure via an intramolecular version of the sulfide contraction were developed at ETH. Later, it was shown at Harvard that the A/B ring closure could also be achieved by thio-iminoester/enamine condensation.

By early 1971, the Harvard group had accomplished the synthesis of the final A–D component, (Note: See Synthesis of the A-D-component carrying the propionic acid function at ring D as nitrile group in (Show/Hide) "The Harvard synthesis of the A-D-components for the A/B approach".) containing a nitrile group as part of side chain "f" located on ring D, different from the remaining carboxyl groups (2, Figure 4; see also Figure 3). The A/D part of the B_{12} structure in carboxyl groups represents, constitutionally and configurationally, the most intricate part of the vitamin molecule; its synthesis is regarded as the apotheosis of the Woodwardian art seen in natural product total synthesis.

=== The alternative approach to cobyric acid synthesis ===
As far back as 1966, the ETH group started to explore a model alternative strategy of corrin synthesis in which the corrin ring would be closed between rings A and D. The project was inspired by the conceivable existence of an unknown bond reorganization process. This reorganization, if existing, would make the construction of cobyric acid from a single starting material a possibility. Importantly, this hypothetical process, being interpreted as implying two sequential rearrangements, was recognized to be formally covered by the new reactivity classifications of sigmatropic rearrangements and electrocyclizations propounded by Woodward and Hoffmann in the context of their orbital symmetry rules!

By May 1968, the ETH group had demonstrated in a model study that the envisaged process, a photochemical A/D-seco-corrinate→corrinate cycloisomerization, does in fact exist. This process was first found to proceed with the palladium(II) complex, but not at all with corresponding nickel(II)- or cobalt(III)-A/D-seco-corrinate complexes. The cycloisomerization also proceeded smoothly in complexes of metal ions such as zinc and other photochemically inert and loosely bound metal ions. These metal ions could, after ring closure, easily be replaced by cobalt. These observations opened the door to what eventually became the photochemical A/D approach of cobyric acid synthesis.

Figure 5 – Overview of the Harvard/ETH collaboration

Starting in fall of 1969, with the B–C component of the A/B approach and a ring D precursor prepared from the enantiomer of the starting material leading to the ring B precursor, it took PhD student Walter Fuhrer less than one and a half years to translate the photochemical model corrin synthesis into a synthesis of 2 (Figure 4), the common corrinoid intermediate on the synthetic pathway to cobyric acid. At Harvard, intermediate 2 was obtained around the same time by coupling the ring D-differentiated Harvard A–D component (available in spring 1971) with the ETH B–C component, applying the condensation methods developed earlier using the undifferentiated A–D component.

In the spring of 1971, two different routes to the common corrinoid intermediate 2 (Figure 4) had become available. The Harvard/ETH A/B approach required 62 synthetic steps, while the ETH A/D approach required 42. In both approaches, the four peripheral rings were derived from enantiopure precursors possessing the correct sense of chirality, thereby circumventing major stereochemical problems in the buildup of the ligand system. In the construction of the A/D junction by the A/D-seco-corrin→corrin cycloisomerization, the formation of two A/D-diastereomers was expected. The use of cadmium(II) as the coordinating metal ion led to a very high diastereoselectivity in favor of the natural A/D-trans-isomer.

Once the corrin structure was formed by either approach, the three C–H stereocenters at the periphery adjacent to the chromophore system turned out to be prone to epimerization. This required a separation of diastereomers in an advanced stage of the syntheses. Coincidentally, the technique of high pressure liquid chromatography (HPLC) had been newly-developed; the technique became an indispensable tool in both laboratories. The use of HPLC in the B_{12} project, pioneered by Jakob Schreiber at ETH, was the earliest application of the technique in natural product synthesis.

=== The joint final steps ===
The final conversion of the common corrinoid intermediate 2 (Figure 6) from the two approaches into the target cobyric acid required the introduction of the two missing methyl groups at the meso C-5 and C-15 positions of the corrin chromophore between rings A/B and C/D, as well as the conversion of all peripheral carboxyl functions into their amide form, except at the critical carboxyl at side chain "f" of ring D (Figure 6). These steps were explored collaboratively in parallel fashion, with the Harvard group using material produced via the A/B approach and the ETH group using material prepared by the photochemical A/D approach.

Figure 6 – Cobyrinate derivatives (Note: Cobester (dicyano-Co-cobyrinic acid heptamethylester) is a non-natural cobyric acid derivative thas t had played an important subsidiary role in the B_{12} total syntheses; it is prepared in one step from vitamin B_{12} by acid-catalyzed methanolysis.)

The first decisive identification of a totally synthetic intermediate on the synthetic pathway to cobyric acid was carried out in February 1972 with a crystalline sample of synthetic dicyano-cobalt(III)-hexamethyl-cobyrinate-f-amide 3 (Figure 6), found to be identical in all data with a crystalline relay sample made from vitamin B_{12} by methanolysis to "cobester" 4, followed by partial ammonolysis and separation of the resulting mixture. At the time when Woodward announced the "Total Synthesis of Vitamin B_{12}" at the IUPAC conference in New Delhi in February 1972, the totally synthetic sample of the f-amide was one that had been made at ETH by the photochemical A/D approach, while the first sample of synthetic cobyric acid, identified using natural cobyric acid, had been obtained at Harvard by partial synthesis from B_{12}-derived f-amide relay material. The Woodward/Eschenmoser achievement around this time had been, strictly speaking, two formal total syntheses of cobyric acid, as well as two formal total syntheses of the vitamin.

In the later course of 1972, two crystalline epimers of 3, as well as two crystalline epimers of the totally synthetic f-nitrile (all prepared using both synthetic approaches) were stringently identified chromatographically and spectroscopically with the corresponding B_{12}-derived substances. At Harvard, cobyric acid was then made also from totally synthetic f-amide 3 prepared via the A/B approach. Finally, in 1976 at Harvard, totally synthetic cobyric acid was converted into vitamin B_{12} via the pathway pioneered by Konrad Bernhauer.

=== The publication record ===
Over the almost 12 years it took the two groups to reach their goal, both Woodward and Eschenmoser periodically reported on the stage of the collaborative project in lectures, some of which appeared in print. Woodward discussed the A/B approach in lectures published in 1968 and 1971, culminating in the announcement of the "Total Synthesis of Vitamin B_{12}" in New Delhi in February 1972 which was published in 1973. This publication, and other lectures under the same title Woodward delivered in the later part of the year 1972, are confined to the A/B approach of the synthesis and do not discuss the ETH A/D approach.

Eschenmoser had discussed the ETH contributions to the A/B approach at the 1968 Robert A. Welch Foundation conference in Houston, as well as in his 1969 RSC Centenary Lecture titled "Roads to Corrins", published in 1970. He presented the ETH photochemical A/D approach to the B_{12} synthesis at the 23rd IUPAC Congress in Boston in 1971. The Zürich-based group announced the accomplishment of the synthesis of cobyric acid via the photochemical A/D-approach in two lectures delivered by PhD students Hans Maag and Walter Fuhrer at the Swiss Chemical Society Meeting in April 1972. Eschenmoser presented a lecture titled "Total Synthesis of Vitamin B_{12}: the Photochemical Route" for the first time as a Wilson Baker Lecture at the University of Bristol on May 8, 1972. (Note: "University of Bristol. WILSON BAKER SYMPOSIUM: Previous Wilson Baker lectures" (PDF). Archived from the original (PDF) on February 29, 2020. See also Eschenmoser lecture announcements in "Notizen". Nachrichten aus Chemie und Technik. 20 (5): 89–90. 1972. doi:10.1002/nadc.19720200502.)

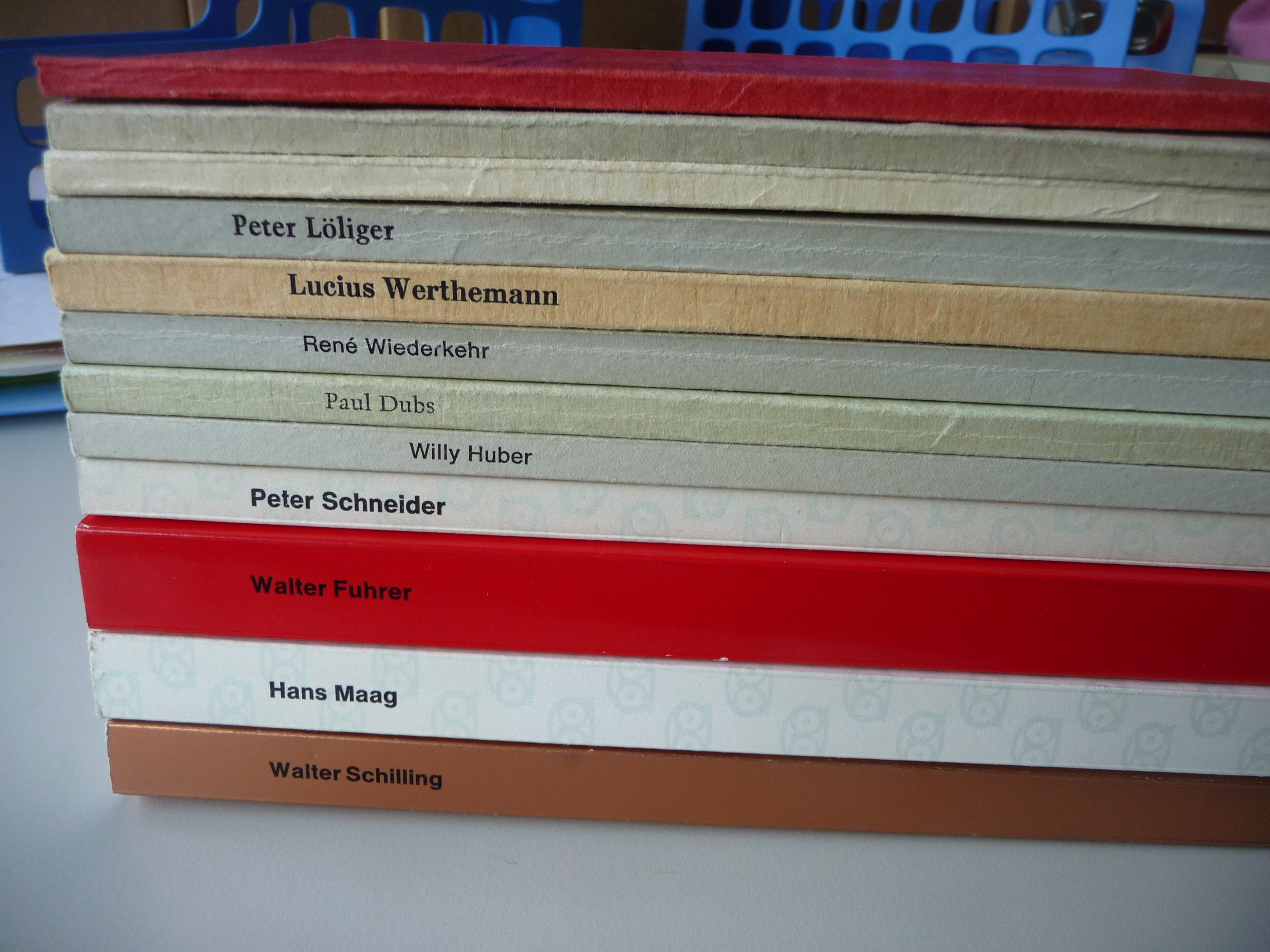
Figure 7a – ETH B_{12} Ph.D. theses (top to bottom, in chronological order: Jost Wild, Urs Locher, Alexander Wick, and)

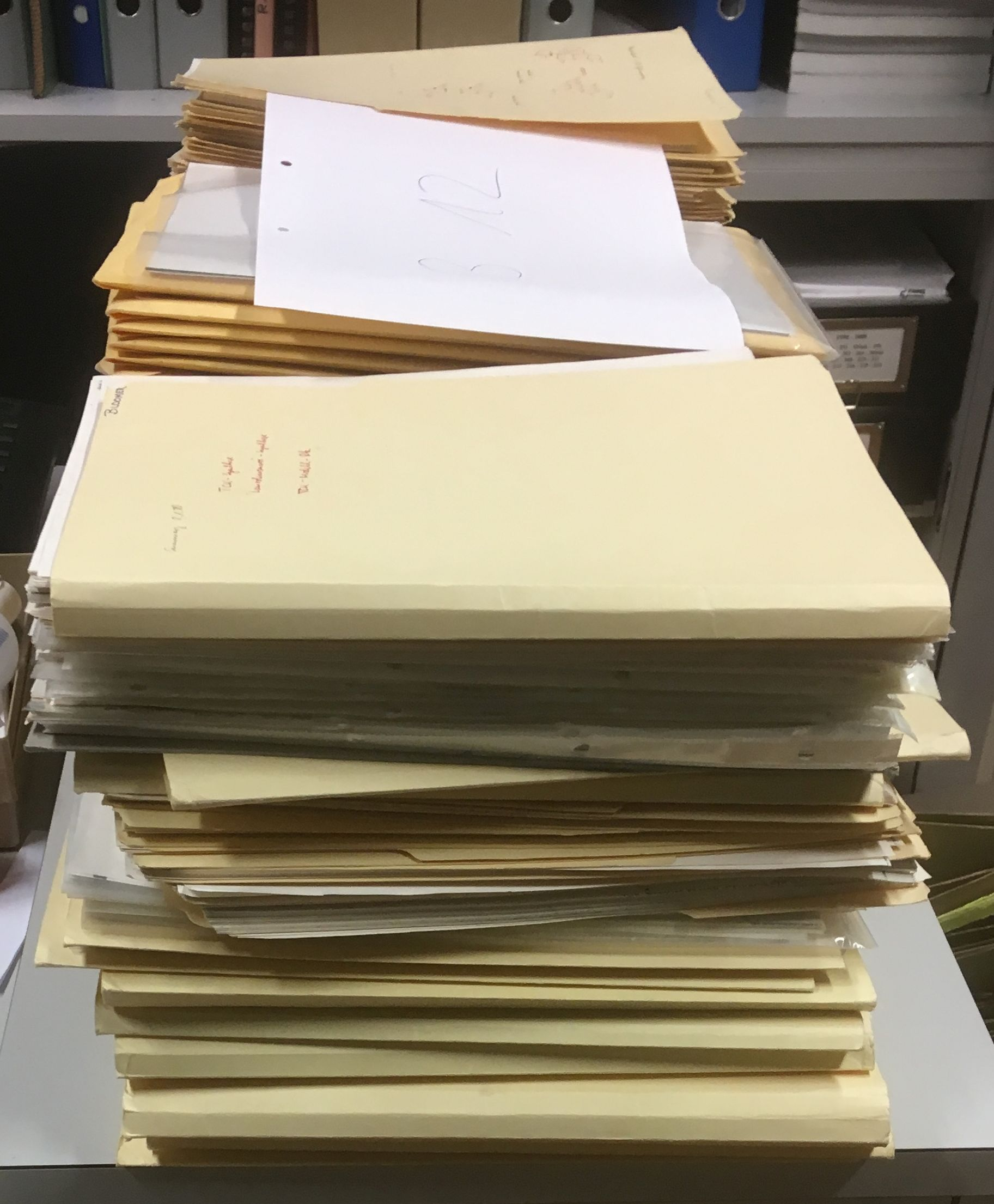
Figure 7b – Three stacks of Harvard B_{12} reports written by postdoctoral researchers (Note: Research reports of the Harvard postdoctoral fellows involved in the vitamin B_{12} synthesis are in the Harvard archives; see "Collection: Papers of Robert Burns Woodward, 1873-1980, 1930-1979 | HOLLIS for Archival Discovery".)

By 1977, a joint, collaborative publication of the syntheses by the Harvard and ETH groups had yet to appear in scientific record. (Note: The only "joint publication" is a 1972 interview with Eschenmoser and Woodward in Basle; see also.) Rather, an article describing the final version of the photochemical A/D approach (previously achieved in 1972) was published in 1977 in Science. This article is an extended English translation of one that had already appeared 1974 in Naturwissenschaften, based on a lecture given by Eschenmoser on January 21, 1974, at a meeting of the Zürcher Naturforschende Gesellschaft.

Four decades later, in 2015, Eschenmoser published a series of six full papers describing the work of the ETH group on corrin synthesis. Part I of the series contains a chapter entitled "The Final Phase of the Harvard/ETH Collaboration on the Synthesis of Vitamin B_{12}", in which the contributions of the ETH group to the collaborative work on the synthesis of vitamin B_{12} between 1965 and 1972 are recorded.

The entirety of the ETH work is documented, in full experimental detail, in publicly accessible PhD theses, totalling almost 1,900 pages, all in German. Contributions of the 14 postdoctoral ETH researchers involved in the cobyric acid syntheses are mostly integrated in these theses. The detailed experimental work at Harvard was documented in reports by the 77 postdoctoral researchers involved, a total volume containing more than 3,000 pages.

Representative reviews of the two approaches to the chemical synthesis of vitamin B_{12} have been published in detail by A. H. Jackson and K. M. Smith, T. Goto, R. V. Stevens, K. C. Nicolaou & E. G. Sorensen, summarized by J. Mulzer & D. Riether, and G. W. Craig, in addition to many other publications where these epochal syntheses are discussed. (Note: References given here are a selection from more than 60 publications where these epochal syntheses are discussed in more or less detail. They are also used to teach natural product synthesis in advanced courses or research group seminars, e.g., Eschenmoser, A. (2001). "Epilogue: Synthesis of Coenzyme B_{12}: A Vehicle for the Teaching of Organic Synthesis". In Quinkert, Gerhard; Kisakürek, M. Volkan (eds.). Essays in Contemporary Chemistry: From Molecular Structure Towards Biology. Zürich: Verlag Helvetica Chimica Acta. pp. 391–441. doi:10.1002/9783906390451.ch12. ISBN 978-3-906390-28-4. free version: Eschenmoser, Albert (2015). "Synthesen von Vitamin B12 (an die Hörer verteilte Unterlagen, Sommersemester 1973)". doi:10.3929/ethz-a-010521002.)

== The Harvard/ETH synthesis of cobyric acid: the path to the common corrinoid intermediate via A/B-corrin ring closure ==
In the A/B approach to cobyric acid, the Harvard A–D component was coupled to the ETH B–C component between rings D and C, and then closed to the corrin between rings A and B. Both these critical steps were accomplished by C–C coupling via sulfide contraction, a new reaction type developed in the synthesis of the B–C component at ETH. The A–D component was synthesized at Harvard from a ring A precursor (prepared from achiral starting materials), and a ring D precursor prepared from (−)-camphor. A model A–D component was used to explore the coupling conditions. This structure differed from the A–D component used in the final synthesis by having a methyl ester group on ring D side chain "f" instead of a nitrile group.

The Harvard synthesis of the A-D-components for the A/B approach

Synthesis of the ring-A precursor

Figure 8 – Harvard synthesis of the A–D components, ring A

The starting point for the synthesis of the ring A precursor was methoxydimethyl-indol H-1, synthesized by condensation of the Schiff base from ''m''-anisidine and acetoin. Reaction with the Grignard reagent of propargyl iodide gave racemic propargyl indolenine rac-H-2; ring closure to the aminoketone rac-H-3 was brought about by BF_{3} and HgO in MeOH through intermediate rac-H-2a (electrophilic addition) with the two methyl groups forced into a cis-relationship by kinetic as well as thermodynamic reasons.

Resolution of the racemic aminoketone into the two enantiomers

Figure 9 – Harvard synthesis of the A–D components, ring A resolution

Reaction of rac-H-3 with (−)-1-phenylethyl isocyanate permitted isolation by crystallization of one of the two diastereomeric urea derivatives formed (the other does not crystallize). Treatment of racemic ketone rac-H-3 (or of mother liquors from the previous crystallization) with (+)-1-phenylethyl isocyanate gave the enantiomer of the first urea derivative. Pyrolytic decomposition of each of these urea derivatives led to enantiopure aminoketones, the desired (+)-H-3 and (−)-H-3. The "unnatural" (−)-H-3 enantiomer was used to determine the absolute configuration. In various later steps, (−)-H-3 and intermediates derived from it were used as model compounds in exploratory experiments. Woodward wrote regarding the unnatural enantiomer "our experience has been such that this is just about the only kind of model study which we regard as wholly reliable".

Determination of the absolute configuration of ring A precursor (+)-H-3

Figure 10 – Harvard synthesis of the A–D components, ring A determination of configuration

For this determination, the levorotatory ("unnatural") enantiomer of aminoketone (−)-H-3 was used in order to save precious material. Acylation of the amino group of (−)-H-3 with chloroacetyl chloride, followed by treatment of the product H-3a with potassium t-butoxide in t-butanol, afforded tetracyclic keto-lactam H-3b. Its keto-carbonyl was converted to a methylene group by desulfurization of the dithioketal of H-3b with Raney nickel to give lactam H-3c. Destruction of the aromatic ring by ozonolysis, involving the loss of a carboxyl function by spontaneous decarboxylation, led to bicyclic lactam-carboxylic acid H-3d. This material was identified with a product H-3h derived from (+)-camphor, possessing the same constitution and the absolute configuration as shown in formula H-3d.

The material used for the identification of H-3d was synthesized from (+)-camphor as follows: cis-isoketopinic acid H-3e, obtained from (+)-camphor by an established route described in the literature, was converted via the corresponding chloride, azide, and isocyanate to methyl-urethane H-3f. When treated with potassium t-butoxide in t-butanol and subsequently with KOH, H-3f was converted to H-3h, clearly by way of the intermediate H-3g. The identity of the two samples of H-3d and H-3h obtained by the two routes described, established the absolute configuration of (+)-H-3, the enantiomer of the ring A precursor.

Synthesis of the ring-D precursor from (–)-camphor

Figure 11 – Harvard synthesis of the A–D components, ring D from (–)-camphor

(−)-Camphor was nitrosated in the α-position of the carbonyl group to give oxime H-4. Beckmann cleavage afforded via the corresponding nitrile the amide H-5. Hofmann degradation via an intermediary amine and its ring closure led to lactam H-6. Conversion of its N-nitroso derivative H-7 gave diazo compound H-8. Thermal decomposition of H-8 induced methyl migration to give cyclopentene H-9. Reduction to H-10 using LiAlH_{4}, followed by oxidation using chromic acid yielded aldehyde H-11. Wittig reaction with carbomethoxymethylenetriphenylphosphorane formed H-12 and subsequent hydrolysis of the ester group finally gave trans-carboxylic acid H-13. (Note: This is the only part of the Harvard contributions published with full experimental details so far: Fleming, Ian; Woodward, R. B. (1973). "A synthesis of (−)-(R)-trans-β-(1,2,3-trimethylcyclopent-2-enyl)acrylic acid". Journal of the Chemical Society, Perkin Transactions 1: 1653–1657. doi:10.1039/P19730001653. Fleming, Ian; Woodward, R. B. (1968). "Exo-2-Hydroxyepicamphor". Journal of the Chemical Society C: Organic: 1289–1291. doi:10.1039/J39680001289.)

Coupling of ring A and ring D precursors to "pentacyclenone"

Figure 12 – Harvard synthesis of the A–D components, coupling of rings A and D to "pentacylenone"

N-acylation of tricyclic aminoketone (+)-H-3 with the chloride H-14 of carboxylic acid H-13 gave amide H-15, which on treatment with potassium t-butoxide in t-butanol stereoselectively produced pentacyclic keto-lactam H-16 via an intramolecular Michael reaction which directs the indicated hydrogen atoms in trans relationship to each other. In anticipation of the Birch reduction of the aromatic ring, protective groups for the two carbonyl functions of H-16 were required, one for the ketone carbonyl group as ketal H-17, and the other for the lactam carbonyl as the highly sensitive enol ether H-20. The latter protection was achieved by treatment of H-17 with Meerwein salt (triethyloxonium tetrafluoroborate) to give iminium salt H-18, followed by conversion to orthoamide H-19 (NaOMe/MeOH), and finally expelling one molecule of methanol by heating in toluene. Birch reduction of H-20 (lithium in liquid ammonia, t-butanol, THF) provided tetraene H-21. Treatment with acid under carefully controlled conditions led first to an intermediate dione with the double bond in β,γ position which moved to the conjugated position in dione H-22, dubbed pentacyclenone.

From "pentacyclenone" to "corrnorsterone"

Figure 13 – Harvard synthesis of the A–D components, from "pentacylenone" to "corrnorsterone"

The ethylene ketal protecting group in pentacyclenone H-22 was converted to the ketone group of H-23 by acid-catalyzed hydrolysis. The dioxime primarily formed by reaction of diketone H-23 with hydroxylammonium chloride was regioselectively hydrolyzed (nitrous acid/acetic acid) to the desired monoxime H-24. This is the oxime of the more sterically hindered ketone group, the nitrogen atom of which is destined to become the nitrogen of the target molecule's ring D. Crucial for this purpose is the configuration at the monoxime double bond, the hydroxyl group occupying the less sterically hindered position. The C–C double bonds of both the cyclopentene and the cyclohexenone ring in H-24 were then cleaved by ozonolysis (ozone at 80 °C in MeOH, periodic acid), and the carboxylic group formed esterified with diazomethane to diketone H-25. An intramolecular aldol condensation of the 1,5-dicarbonyl unit in MeOH using pyrrolidine acetate as the base, followed by tosylation of the oxime's hydroxyl group, afforded the cyclohexenone derivative H-26. A second ozonolysis in wet methyl acetate, followed by treatment with periodic acid and diazomethane gave H-27. Beckmann rearrangement (MeOH, sodium polystyrene sulfonate, 2 hrs, 170 °C) produced regioselectively lactam H-27a (not isolated) which reacted further in an amine-carbonyl condensation → aldol condensation cascade to the tetracycle H-28, called α-corrnorsterone in reference to it as a "cornerstone" intermediate in the synthesis of the desired A-D-component.

This compound required strongly alkaline conditions in order to open its lactam ring, but it was discovered that a minor isomer (also isolated from the reaction mixture) β-corrnorsterone H-29, undergoes this lactam ring opening under alkaline conditions with great ease. Structurally, the two isomers differ only in the orientation of the propionic acid side chain at ring A; the β-isomer has the more stable trans-orientation of this chain relative to the neighboring acetic acid chain formed after opening of the lactam ring. Equilibration of α-corrnorsterone H-28 by heating in strong base, followed by acidification and treatment with diazomethane, led to the isolation of pure β-corrnorsterone H-29 in 90 % yield. The correct absolute configuration of the six contiguous asymmetric centers in β-corrnorsterone was confirmed by an X-ray crystal structure analysis of bromo-β-corrnorsterone with the "unnatural" configuration.

Synthesis of the A–D component carrying the propionic acid function at ring D as methoxycarbonyl group (the model A–D component)

Figure 14 – Harvard synthesis of the A–D components: side chain "f"-undifferentiated model A–D component

Treatment of β-corrnorsterone H-29 with methanolic HCl cleaved the lactam ring and produced an enol ether derivative named hesperimine (Note: This name of a left-hand side ("western half") building block relates to the Hesperides, the Nymphs of the West, as do Hesperidium and (the chemically completely unrelated) Hesperidin; cf. other colorful namings by Woodward: pentacyclenone, corrnorsterone; corrigenolide, corrigenate: corrin-generating seco-corrins. The ETH group had named its right-hand side building block "(thio)dextrolin" based on "dexter", Latin for "right".) H-30u. Ozonolysis to aldehyde H-32u, followed by reduction of the aldehyde group with NaBH_{4} in MeOH to give primary alcohol H-33u and, finally, conversion of the hydroxy group via the corresponding mesylate gave bromide H-34u. This constitutes the model A–D component, the one with an undifferentiated propionic acid function at ring D, bearing a methyl ester group like all other side chains.

Synthesis of the A–D component carrying the propionic acid function at ring D as nitrile group

Figure 15 – Harvard synthesis of the A–D components, Side chain "f"-differentiated A–D component

Conversion of β-corrnorsterone H-29 to the proper A–D component H-34 containing the carboxyl function of the ring D propionic acid side chain as a nitrile group, differentiated from all the other methoxycarbonyl groups, involved the following steps: treatment of H-29 with a methanolic solution of thiophenol and HCl afforded phenyl-thioenolether derivative H-30, which upon ozonolysis at low temperature gave the corresponding thioester-aldehyde H-31 and, when followed by treatment with liquid ammonia, the amide H-32. Reduction of the aldehyde group with NaBH_{4} to H-33, mesylation of the primary hydroxy group with methanesulfonic anhydride under conditions that also convert the primary amide group into the desired nitrile group and, finally, replacement of the methansulfonyloxy group by bromide produced A-D-component H-34 with the propionic acid function at ring D as nitrile, differentiated from all other such side chains.

Coupling of Harvard A-D-components with the ETH B-C-component

The construction of the corrin chromophore with its three vinylogous amidine units constitutes–besides the direct single bond connection between the rings A and D–the central challenge to any attempt to synthesize vitamin B_{12}. The very first approach to a total synthesis of vitamin B_{12} launched by Cornforth was discontinued when confronted with the task of coupling synthesized ring precursors. Coupling the Harvard A–D component with the ETH B–C component required extensive exploratory work, in spite of the knowledge gained by the ETH model syntheses of less peripherally substituted corrins. What might be called an epic engagement for formally making just two C–C bonds lasted from early 1967 until June 1970.

Both at ETH and Harvard, extensive model studies on the coupling of simplified enamine analogues of the A–D component with the ring C iminoester and thio-iminoester derivative of the full-fledged B–C component had consistently shown that a coupling of the Harvard and the ETH components could hardly be achieved by the method that had been so successful in the synthesis of the simpler corrins, namely, by an intermolecular enamino-imino(or thio-imino)ester condensation The outcome of these model studies determined the final structure type of a Harvard A–D component, a structure capable of acting as a component of a C/D coupling by sulfide contraction, (bromide H-34u). This method had already been implemented by the ETH group in the synthesis of the B–C component.

An extensive search for optimal conditions, first for a C/D coupling of a A–D component with the ETH B–C component E-19, then for conditions of the subsequent intramolecular A/B-corrin ring closure was pursued in both laboratories, using the side chain "f"-undifferentiated model A–D component H-34u as a model. Work by Yoshito Kishi found the optimal conditions for the C/D coupling at Harvard, while Peter Schneider at ETH determined the first and most reliable method for the corrin ring closure between rings A and B. The procedures of C/D coupling and A/B-corrin ring closure developed in this model series were later applied to the corresponding steps in the side chain "f"-differentiated series as parts of the cobyric acid synthesis.

Synthesis of dicyano-cobalt(III)-5,15-bisnor-a,b,c,d,e,f,g-heptamethyl-cobyrinate from the ring D undifferentiated model A–D component

D/C coupling.

Figure 16 – Harvard/ETH A/B approach, D/C coupling of the Harvard model A–D component with the ETH B–C component

The key problem in this step was the lability of the primary coupling product, thioether HE-35u, isomerizing to other thioethers at first not amenable to sulfide contraction in a reproducible procedure with acceptable yields. Induced by potassium t-butoxide in THF/t-butanol under rigorously controlled conditions with strict exclusion of air and moisture, the model A-D-component H-34u smoothly reacted with the B-C-component E-19 to give the sulfur-bridged coupling product HE-35u, named "thioether type I", in essentially quantitative yield. However, this product could be isolated only under very carefully controlled conditions, since it equilibrates with extreme ease (e.g., chromatography, or traces of trifluoroacetic acid in methylenechloride solution) to the more stable isomeric thioether HE-36u (thioether type II) which contains, in contrast to thioether type I, the π-system of a conjugatively stabilized vinylogous amidine. Depending on conditions, still another isomer HE-37u (thioether type III) was observed. Starting with such mixtures of coupling products, the ETH group found a variety of conditions (e.g. methyl-mercury complex, BF_{3}, triphenylphosphine) that could induce (via HE-38u) the contraction step to HE-39u in moderate yields. With the choice of the solvent found to be crucial; at Harvard, the optimal procedure was heating thiother type II HE-36u in sulfolane in the presence of 5.3 equivalents trifluoroacetic acid and 4.5 equivalents of tris-(β-cyanoethyl)-phosphine at 60 °C for 20 hours, producing HE-39u in up to 85% yield. Later it was discovered that nitromethane could also be used as solvent.

A/B ring closure.

The problem of corrin ring closure between rings A and B was solved in two different ways, one developed at ETH, the other pursued at Harvard. Both methods correspond to procedures developed before in the synthesis of metal complexes as well as free ligands of simpler corrins. In the explorations of ring-closure procedures for the much more highly substituted A/B-seco-corrinoid intermediate HE-39u, the ETH group focused on the intramolecular version of the oxidative sulfide contraction method, eventually leading to the dicyano-cobalt(III)-complex HE48u. This first totally synthetic corrinoid intermediate was identified with a corresponding sample derived from vitamin B_{12}.

At Harvard, it was shown that the closure to the corrin macrocycle could also be realized by the method of thioiminoester/enamine condensation. All reactions described here had to be executed on a very small scale and with "... the utmost rigour in the exclusion of oxygen from the reaction mixtures". Further, most of these were also under strict exclusion of moisture and light, demanding very high standards of experimental expertise.

The major obstacle in achieving an A/B-corrin ring closure was the exposure of the highly unstable ring B exocyclic methylidene double bond, which tends to isomerize into a more stable, unreactive endocyclic position with great ease.

Figure 17 – Harvard/ETH A/B approach, A/B-ring closure to the side chain "f"-undifferentiated model 5,15-bisnorcobyrinate

The problem was solved at ETH by finding that treatment of the thiolactone-thiolactam intermediate HE-40u (obtained from HE-39u by reacting with P_{2}S_{5}) with dimethylamine in dry MeOH (room temperature, exclusion of air and light) smoothly opens the thiolactone ring at ring B, forming by elimination of H_{2}S the exocyclic methylidene double bond as well as a dimethylamino-amide group in the acetic acid side chain. These conditions are mild enough to prevent double bond tautomerization to the thermodynamically more stable isomeric position in the ring. Immediate conversion with a Zn-perchlorate-hexa(dimethylformamide) complex in methanol to zinc complex HE-41u, followed by oxidative coupling (0,05 mM solution of I_{2}/KI in MeOH, 3 h) afforded HE-42u. Sulfide contraction (triphenylphosphine, trifluoroacetic acid, 85 °C, exclusion of air and light) followed by re-complexation with Zn(ClO_{4})_{2} (KCl, MeOH, diisopropylamine) led to the chloro-zinc complex HE-43u. The free corrinium salt formed when HE-43u was treated with trifluoroacetic acid in acetonitrile was re-complexed with anhydrous CoCl_{2} in THF to the dicyano-cobalt(III)-complex HE-44u. Conversion of the dimethylamino-amide group in the acetic acid side chain of ring B into the corresponding methylester group (O-methylation by trimethyloxonium tetrafluoroborate, followed by decomposition of the iminium salt with aqueous NaHCO_{3}) afforded totally synthetic 5,15-bisnor-heptamethyl cobyrinate HE-48u. A crystalline sample of HE-48u was identified via UV/VIS, IR, and ORD spectra with a corresponding crystalline sample derived from vitamin B_{12}

Later at Harvard, the A/B-corrin ring closure was also achieved by converting the thiolactone-thiolactame intermediate HE-40u to thiolactone-thioiminoester HE-45u by S-methylation of the thiolactam sulfur (MeHgOi-Pr, then trimethyloxonium tetrafluoroborate). The product HE-45u was subjected to treatment with dimethylamine (as in the ETH variant), forming the highly labile methylidene derivative HE-46u, which then was converted with anhydrous CoCl_{2} in THF to dicyano-cobalt(III) complex HE-47u, the substrate ready to undergo the A→B ring closure by a thioiminoester/enamine condensation. A careful search at Harvard for reaction conditions led to a procedure (KO-t-Bu, 120 °C, two weeks) that gave corrin cobalt complex HE-44u, identical with and in overall yields comparable with HE-44u obtained by the ETH variant of the sulfide contraction procedure. Since in corrin model syntheses such a C–C condensation required induction by a strong base, its application in a substrate containing seven methylester groups was not without problems; milder reaction conditions were applied.

Synthesis of dicyano-cobalt(III)-5,15-bisnor-a,b,d,e,g-pentamethyl-cobyrinate-c-N,N-dimethylamide-f-nitrile (the common corrinoid intermediate) from the ring D-differentiated A–D component

Figure 18 – Harvard/ETH A/B approach, coupling of the Harvard side chain "f"-differentiated A–D component with the ETH B–C component to the common corrinoid intermediate

The A–D component H-34 with its propionic acid function at ring D differentiated from all the other carboxyl functions as a nitrile group had become available at Harvard in the spring of 1971. As a result of the comprehensive exploratory work that had been done with the model A–D component at Harvard and ETH, joining the proper A–D component H-34 with the B–C component E-19 by three operations H-34 + E-19 →→ HE-36 → HE-39.

Closing the corrin ring was achieved in the sequence HE-39 (P_{2}S_{5}, xylene, γ-picoline)→ HE-40 → HE-41 → HE-42 → HE-43 (overall yield "about 60 %"), and finally to cobalt complex HE-44. Reactions in this sequence were based on the procedures developed in the undifferentiated model series. Two methods were available for the A/B ring closure: oxidative sulfide contraction within a zinc complex, followed by exchange of zinc by cobalt (ETH), or the Harvard alkylative variant of a sulfide contraction, thio-iminoester/enamine condensation of the cobalt complex (improved reaction conditions: diazabicyclononanone in DMF, 60 °C, several hours). Woodward preferred the former one, writing: "...the oxidative method is somewhat superior, in that it is relatively easier to reproduce, .... ".

The corrin complex dicyano-cobalt(III)-5,15-bisnor-pentamethyl-cobyrinate-c-N,N-dimethylamide-f-nitrile HE-44 took up the role of the common corrinoid intermediate in the two approaches to cobyric acid synthesis: HE-44 ≡ E-37. Due to the high configurational lability of C–H stereocenters C-3, C-8 and C-13 at the ligand periphery in basic or acidic milieu, separation by HPLC was indispensable for isolation, purification and characterization of pure diastereomers of this and the following corrinoid intermediates.

Preparation of ring C precursor from (+)-camphor by the Harvard group

Figure 19 – Harvard preparation of the ring C precursor from (+)-camphor

Starting material for the synthesis of a ring C precursor was (+)-camphorquinone H-35 (Note: Camphorquinone is produced from camphor by reaction with selenium dioxide: see White, James D.; Wardrop, Duncan J.; Sundermann, Kurt F. (2002). "Camphorquinone and Camphorquinone Monoxime". Organic Syntheses. 79. Checked by Kenji Koga, Kei Manabe, Christopher E. Neipp, and Stephen F. Martin: 125. doi:10.15227/orgsyn.079.0125.) which was converted to the acetoxy-trimethylcyclohexene-carboxylic acid H-36 by BF_{3} in acetic anhydride, a reaction pioneered by O. Manasse and E. Samuel in 1902,, already successfully applied in a previous synthesis of the ring C precursor by Pelter and Cornforth. Conversion of H-36 to amide H-37 was followed by its ozonolysis to peroxide H-38 which was reduced to the keto-succinimide H-46 by zinc and MeOH. Treatment with methanolic HCl gave lactam H-40, followed by thermal elimination of methanol to the ring C precursor H-41 This was found to be identical with the ring-C precursor E-13 prepared by a different route at ETH.

== The ETH synthesis of cobyric acid: the path to the common corrinoid intermediate via A/D-corrin-ring closure ==
In the A/D approach to the synthesis of cobyric acid, the four ring precursors (ring C precursor only formally so) derive from the two enantiomers of one common chiral starting material. All three vinylogous amidine bridges that connect the four peripheral rings were constructed by the sulfide contraction method, with the B–C component–already prepared for the A/B approach–serving as an intermediate. The photochemical A/D seco-corrin→corrin cycloisomerization, by which the corrin ring was closed between rings A and D, is a novel process, targeted and found to exist in a model study (Figure 2).

Synthesis of the ETH B-C-component (part of the A/B as well as A/D approach)

Syntheses of the ring B precursor

Two syntheses of ring B precursor (+)-E-5 were realized; the one starting from 2-butanone was used further. Two pathways for the conversion of the ring B precursor into the ring C precursor (+)-E-5 → (−)-E-13 ≡ H-41 were developed, one at ETH,, and one at Harvard. (Note: Wick, Alexander: Report Part I, Harvard University 1967 (unpublished), quoted in.) These conversions turned out to be inadequate for producing large amounts of ring C precursor. However, the pathway developed at ETH served the purpose of determining the absolute configuration of the ring B precursor. Bulk amounts of ring C precursor to be used for the production of the B–C component at ETH were prepared at Harvard from (+)-camphor by a route originally developed by Pelter and Cornforth.

Figure 20 – ETH synthesis of the B–C component, synthesis of the two enantiomers of the ring B precursor

Ring B precursor from 2-butanone and glyoxylic acid.

Aldol condensation between 2-butanone and glyoxylic acid by treatment with concentrated phosphoric acid gave stereoselectively (trans)-3-methyl-4-oxo-2-pentenoic acid E-1. Diels–Alder reaction of E-1 with butadiene in benzene in the presence of SnCl_{4} afforded the racemate of the chiral Diels–Alder adduct E-2 which was resolved into the enantiomers by sequential salt formation with both (−)- and (+)-1-phenylethylamine. The chiral centerss of the (+)-enantiomer (+)-E-2 possessed the absolute configuration of ring B in vitamin B_{12}. Oxidation of this (+)-enantiomer with chromic acid in acetone in the presence of sulfuric acid afforded the dilactone (+)-E-3 of the intermediary tricarboxylic acid E-3a. Thermodynamic control of dilactone formation leads to the cis-configuration of the ring junction. Elongation of the acetic acid side chain of (+)-E-3 by the Arndt-Eistert reaction (via the corresponding acid chloride and diazoketone) gave dilactone (+)-E-4. Treatment of (+)-E-4 with NH_{3} in MeOH at room temperature formed a dual mixture of isomeric lactam-lactones in a ratio of 2:1, with ring B precursor (+)-E-5 predominating (isolated in 55% yield). The isomeric lactam-lactone could be isomerized to (+)-E-5 by treatment in methanolic HCl.

Figure 21 – ETH synthesis of the B–C component, alternative synthesis of the racemic ring B precursor (note: only one enantiomer shown for racemates)

Alternative synthesis of racemic ring-B precursor from Hagemann's ester: implementation of the amidacetal-Claisen rearrangement.

Five steps were needed to transform Hagemann's ester rac-E-6 into the racemate of the lactam-lactone rac-E-5 form of the ring B precursor. The product of the C-methylation step rac-E-6 → rac-E-7 (NaH, CH_{3}I) was purified via its crystalline oxime. The cis-hydroxy-ester (configuration secured by lactone formation) resulting from the reduction step rac-E-7 → rac-E-8 (NaBH_{4}) had to be separated from the trans isomer. The thermal rearrangement rac-E-8 → rac-E-9 constitutes the implementation of the amidacetal-Claisen rearrangement in organic synthesis, a precedent to Johnson's orthoester-Claisen and Ireland's ester-enolate rearrangement. Ozonolysis (O_{3}/MeOH, HCOOH/H_{2}O_{2}) of the N,N-dimethylamide ester rac-E-9 afforded dilactone acid rac-E-10, from which two reactions led to lactam-lactone methylester rac-E-7, the racemate of ring-B precursor (+)-E-7.

Determination of absolute configuration of (+)-ring B precursor via its conversion into the (+)-ring C precursor

Figure 22 – ETH synthesis of the B–C component, conversion of ring B precursor to ring C precursor

The conversion of ring B precursor into the ring C precursor was based on a reductive decarbonylation of thiolactone E-12 with chloro-tris-(triphenylphosphino)-rhodium(I). Treatment of a methanolic solution of ring B precursor (+)-E-5 with diazomethane in the presence of catalytic amounts of sodium methoxide, followed by thermal elimination of methanol, gave methylidene lactam E-11, which was converted to the thiolactone E-12 with liquid H_{2}S containing a catalytic amount of trifluoracetic acid. Heating E-12 in toluene with the Rh(I)-complex afforded ring C precursor (−)-E-13 besides the corresponding cyclopropane derivative E-14. Ring C precursors prepared via this route and from (+)-camphor at Harvard were found to be identical: (−)-E-13 ≡ H-41.

Ozonolysis of ring C precursor (−)-E-13 gave succinimide derivative (−)-E-15. This succinimide was found to be identical in constitution and optical rotation with the corresponding succinimide derived from ring C of Vitamin B_{12}, isolated after ozonolysis of crystalline heptamethyl-cobyrinate (cobester) prepared from Vitamin B_{12}.

The approach pursued at Harvard for conversion of ring B precursor into ring C precursor was based on a photochemical degradation of the acetic acid side chain carboxyl group, starting from (+)-E-7 prepared at ETH.

Coupling of ring B and ring C precursors to the B–C component and implementation of the sulfide contraction C–C condensation method

The iminoester/enamine C–C condensation method for constructing the vinylogous amidine system, developed in the model studies on corrin synthesis, failed completely in attempts to create the targeted C–C bond between ring B precursor (+)-E-5 with ring C precursor (−)-E-13 to give the B–C component E-18. The problem was solved by "intramolecularization" of the bond formation process between the electrophilic thio-iminoester carbon and the nucleophilic methylidene carbon of the enamine system through first oxidatively connecting these two centers by a sulfur bridge, and then achieving the C–C bond formation by a now intramolecular thio-iminoester/enamine condensation with concomitant transfer of the sulfur to a thiophile.

Figure 23: ETH synthesis of the B-C-component: coupling of the ring B and C precursors (implementation of C/C-coupling by the sulfide-contraction method)

Conversion of lactam (+)-E-5 into the corresponding thiolactam E-16 (P_{2}S_{5}), oxidation of E-16 with benzoyl peroxide in the presence of ring C precursor (−)-E-13 (prepared by Harvard via the Cornforth route), followed by heating the reaction product E-17 in triethylphosphite (as both solvent and thiophile) afforded B–C component E-18 as a unseparated mixture of two epimers (regarding the configuration of the propionic side chain at ring B) in up to 80% yield.

The bracketed formulas in the reaction scheme illustrate the type of mechanism operating in the process. E-16a = primary coupling of E-12 and E-10 to E-13; E-17a = extrusion of the sulfur atom (captured by thiophile) to E-14, where it is left open whether this latter process occurs at the stage of the episulfide. This reaction concept developed at this stage, dubbed sulfide contraction, turned out to make the construction of all three meso-carbon bridges of the vitamin's corrin ligand possible in both approaches of the synthesis.

The conversion of bicyclic lactone-lactam E-18 into the corresponding thiolactone-thiolactam E-20 was brought about by heating with P_{2}S_{5}/4-methylpyridine in xylene at 130 °C; milder conditions produced thiolactam-lactone E-19, used for coupling with the Harvard A–D components.

Coupling of the B-C-component with ring-D and ring-A precursors

Synthesis of ring D precursor for the A/D approach

Figure 24 – ETH A/D approach to cobyric acid, synthesis of ring D precursor

The starting material for the ring D precursor, the (−)-enantiomer of the dilactone-carboxylic acid (−)-E-3, was prepared from the (−)-enantiomer of the Diels–Alder adduct (−)-E-2 (Note: See Syntheses of the ring-B precursor in (Show/Hide) "Synthesis of the ETH B-C-component".) by oxydation with chromic acid/sulfuric acid in acetone. Treatment of (−)-E-3 with NH_{3} in MeOH gave a lactone-lactam-acid which was esterified with diazomethane to the ester E-21, the lactone ring of which was opened with KCN in MeOH to give E-22. Conventional conditions of an Arndt-Eistert reaction (SOCl_{2}: acid chloride, then CH_{2}N_{2} in THF: diazoketone, treated with Ag_{2}O in MeOH) led to an unforeseen, yet useful ring closure of the originally-formed chain-elongated ester through participation of the cyano group as a neighboring electrophile, affording the bicyclic enamino-ester derivative E-23. Hydrolysis with aqueous HCl, accompanied by decarboxylation, and re-esterification with diazomethane gave keto-lactam-ester E-24. Ketalization ((CH_{2}OH)_{2}, CH(OCH_{3})_{3}, TsOH) of E-24 and conversion of this lactam-ester to thiolactam E-25 (P_{2}S_{5}) was followed by reductive removal of the sulfur with Raney nickel, acetylation of the amino group, and hydrolysis of the ketal (AcOH) to afford E-26. This was converted by deacetylation of the amino group with HCl, and then by treatment with NH_{2}OH/HCl, MeOH/NaOAc into oxime E-27. Beckmann fragmentation (HCl, SOCl_{2} in CHCl_{3}, N-polystyryl-piperidine) of this oxime E-27 produced imino-nitrile E-28, which, when treated with bromine (in MeOH, phosphate buffer pH 7.5, -10 °C) gave ring-D precursor E-29.

Conversion of the ring B precursor into the ring A precursor for the A/D approach

Figure 25 – ETH A/D approach to cobyric acid, conversion of ring B precursor into ring A precursor

The ring A precursor (−)-E-31 required in the A/D approach is a close derivative of ring B precursor (+)-E-5. Its preparation from (+)-E-5 required opening of the lactone group (KCN in MeOH), followed by re-esterification with diazomethane to E-30, then conversion of the lactam group into a thiolactam group with P_{2}S_{5} to yield (−)-E-31.

Coupling of the B–C component with ring D and ring A precursors

The most efficient way of attaching the two rings D and A to the B–C component E-18 was to convert E-18 directly into its thiolactam-thiolactone derivative E-20 and then to proceed by first coupling ring D precursor E-29 to ring C, and then ring A precursor E-31 to ring B, both by the sulfide contraction method. The search for the reaction conditions for these attachments was greatly facilitated by exploratory work done on the two sulfide contraction steps in the A/B approach model study.

Figure 26 – ETH A/D approach to cobyric acid, attaching ring C and ring A precursors to the B–C component to yield the A/D-seco-corrin

Attachment of ring D precursor E-29 to the ring C thiolactam in E-20 by sulfide contraction via alkylative coupling (t-BuOK in t-BuOH/THF, tris-(β-cyano-ethyl)-phosphin/CF_{3}COOH in sulfolane) afforded the B/C/D-sesqui-corrinoid E-32. To attach ring-A precursor E-31, the ring B of E-32 was induced to expose its exocyclic methylidene double bond by treatment with dimethylamine in MeOH (using the method (Note: See A/B-ring closure in (Show/Hide) "Coupling of Harvard A-D-components with the ETH B-C-component".) developed by Schneider) forming E-33 which was subjected to the following cascade of operations: iodination (N-iodosuccinimide, CH_{2}Cl_{2}, 0°C), coupling with the thiolactam sulfur of the ring A precursor E-31 ([(CH_{3})_{3}Si]_{2}N-Na in benzene/t-BuOH), complexation (Cd(ClO_{4})_{2} in MeOH), treatment with triphenylphosphine/CF_{3}COOH in boiling benzene (sulfide contraction) and, finally, re-complexation with Cd(ClO_{4})_{2}/N,N-diisopropylethylamine in benzene/MeOH). These six operations, all carried out without isolation of intermediates, gave A/D-seco-corrin complex E-34 as mixture of peripheral epimers (separable via HPLC) in 42–46% overall yield.

A/D-corrin ring closure by the photochemical A/D-seco-corrin→corrin cycloisomerization

A/D-corrin ring closure by the photochemical A/D-seco-corrin→corrin cycloisomerization to dicyano-cobalt(III)-5,15-bisnor-a,b,d,e,g-pentamethyl-cobyrinate-c-N,N-dimethylamide-f-nitrile (the common corrinoid intermediate)

The conditions and prerequisites for the final (A→D)-corrin ring closure were taken over from extensive corrin model studies. Problems specific to the cobyric acid synthesis that had to be tackled were: the possible formation of two diastereomeric A/D-trans-junctions in the ring closure, exposure of the methylidene double bond at ring A of the A/D-seco-corrin E-34 in a labile cadmium complex, and epimerizability of the peripheral stereogenic centers C-3, C-8 and C-13 before and after ring closure.

Figure 27 – ETH A/D approach to cobyric acid, photochemical A/D-seco-corrin→corrin cycloisomerization to the common corrinoid intermediate

Figure 27a – UV-VIS spectral changes observed during the photochemical A/D-ring closure of a stereochemically pure sample of the Cd-complex of 3α,8α,13α-A/D-seco-corrin E-35 to the corresponding metal-free corrin E-36

Figure 28 – ETH A/D approach to cobyric acid, coil selectivity in A/D ring closure

In the application of this novel process in the A/D approach of the cobyric acid synthesis, the reaction proceeded most efficiently and with highest coil stereoselectivity in favor of the natural A/D-trans junction in an A/D-seco-corrin cadmium complex. Treatment of Cd-complex E-34 as mixture of peripheral epimers with 1,8-Diazabicyclo(5.4.0)undec-7-ene in sulfolane at 60°C under strict protection against light to eliminate the cyano group at ring A, directly followed by re-treatment with Cd(ClO_{4})_{2}, led to labile A/D-seco-corrin complex E-35 as a mixture of peripheral epimers. This was directly subjected to the key step, the photochemical ring closure reaction under rigorous exclusion of air: visible light, under argon, MeOH, AcOH, 60°C. Product of the A/D ring closure was the free corrin ligand E-36, as the originally formed Cd-corrinate (in contrast to the Cd-seco-corrinate E-35) decomplexes in the reaction medium. Corrin E-36 was immediately complexed (CoCl_{2}, KCN, air, H_{2}O, CH_{2}Cl_{2}) and finally isolated (thick-layer chromatography) as mixture of peripheral epimers in 45–50% yield over four operations: the common corrinoid intermediate dicyano-cobalt(III)-complex E-37 ≡ HE-44. (Note: See Synthesis of dicyano-cobalt(III)-5,15-bisnor-a,b,d,e,g-pentamethyl-cobyrinate-c-N,N-dimethylamide-f-nitrile (the common corrinoid intermediate) from the ring-D-differentiated A-D-component in (Show/Hide) "Coupling of Harvard A-D-components with the ETH B-C-component".)

HPLC analysis of this mixture E-37 showed the presence of six epimers with natural ligand helicity (Σ 95%, CD spectra), among them 26% of natural diastereomer 3α,8α,13α, and an equal amount of its C-13 neo-epimer 3α,8α,13β. Two HPLC fractions (Σ 5%) contained diastereomers with unnatural ligand helicity, as shown by inverse CD spectra. Product mixtures from several such cycloisomerizations were combined for preparative HPLC separation and full characterization of the 14 isolated diastereomers of E-37 (of 16 theoretically possible, regarding helicity and the epimeric centers C-3, C-8, C-13).

In an analytical run, the mixture of cadmium-seco-complex epimers E-35 was separated by HPLC (in the dark) into the natural chloro-cadmium-3α,8α,13α-A/D-seco-corrinate diastereomer (ααα)-E-35 and four other epimer fractions Upon irradiation and following cobaltation, (ααα)-E-35 produced E-37 in yields of 70-80% as an essentially dual mixture of mainly the 3α,8α,13α epimer, besides some 3α,8α,13β epimer. Less than 1% of fractions with unnatural coil were formed (HPLC, UV-VIS, CD).

Mechanistically, the photochemical A/D-seco-corrin corrin cycloisomerization involves an antarafacial sigmatropic shift of the α-hydrogen of the CH_{2} position C-19 at ring D to the CH_{2} position of the methylidene group at ring A within a triplet excited state, creating a transient 15-center-16-electron π-system (see E-35a in fig. 27) that antarafacially collapses between positions C-1 and C-19 to the corrin system. The coil selectivity of the ring closure in favor of the corrin ligand's natural helicity is interpreted as relating to the difference in steric hindrance between the g-methoxycarbonyl acetic acid chain at ring D and the methylidene region of ring A in the two possible helical coil configurations of the A/D-seco-corrin complex (Figure 28).

== ETH/Harvard – the jointly executed final steps from the common corrinoid intermediate to cobyric acid ==
The final steps from the common corrinoid intermediate E-37/HE-44 to cobyric acid E-44/HE-51 were carried out by the two groups collaboratively and in parallel, with the ETH group working with material produced by the A/D approach, and the Harvard group with that from the A/B approach. What the two groups in fact accomplished thus were the common final steps of two different syntheses.

The tasks in this end phase of the project were the regioselective introduction of methyl groups at the meso C-5 and C-15 positions of E-37/HE-44, followed by conversion of all its peripheral carboxyl functions into primary amide groups, excepting that in side chain "f" at ring D, which had to end up as free carboxyl. These conceptually simple finishing steps turned out to be rather complex in aon, including unforeseen pitfalls, including a dramatic loss of precious synthetic material on July 9, 1971 in what came to be known as "Black Friday".

Introduction of methyl groups in two meso positions

Figure 29 – ETH/Harvard joint final steps, introduction of methyl groups at the meso positions C-5 and C-15

This introduction of methyl groups could draw on exploratory studies on model corrins as well as on exploratory experiments carried out at ETH on cobester and its (c→C-8)-lactone derivative. Chloromethyl benzyl ether alkylated the meso position C-10 of cobester, but not that of the corresponding lactone, the difference in behavior reflecting the difference in steric hindrance exerted on the meso position C-10 by its neighboring substituents. This finding was decisive for the choice of the substrate to be used for introducing methyl groups at meso positions C-5 and C-10 of E-37/HE-44. In this final phase of the synthesis, HPLC again turned out to be indispensable for separation, isolation, characterization and, perhaps most importantly, identification of pure isomers of dicyano-cobalt(III)-complexes of total as well as partial synthetic origin.

The first step was to convert the c-N,N-dimethylcarboxamide group of E-37/HE-44 into the (c→C-8)-lactone derivative E-38/HE-45 by treatment with iodine/AcOH effecting iodination at C-8, followed by intramolecular O-alkylation of the carboxamide group to an iminium salt that hydrolyzes to the lactone. This lactonization leads to cis-fused rings. Reaction of (c→C-8)-lactone E-38/HE-45 with chloromethyl benzyl ether in acetonitrile in the presence of LiCl gave, besides mono-adduct, the bis-benzyloxy adduct E-39/HE-46. When treated with thiophenol, this produced the bis-phenylthio-derivative E-40/HE-47. Treatment with Raney nickel in MeOH not only set free the two methyl groups at the meso positions, but also reductively opened the lactone ring to the free c-carboxyl group at ring B, producing the correct α-configuration at C-8. Esterification of c-carboxyl with diazomethane afforded hexamethylester-f-nitrile E-41/HE-48. For steric reasons, only the predominant C-3 α-epimer (with the C-3 side chain below the plane of the corrin ring) reacted to a 5,15-disubstituted product E-38/H-45, the reaction thus amounting to a chemical separation of the C-3 epimers.

In improved procedures developed at Harvard later in 1972, the reagent chloromethyl benzyl ether was replaced by formaldehyde/sulfolane/HCl in acetonitrile for the alkylation step, and Raney nickel in the reduction step was replaced by zinc/acetic acid to give E-41/HE-48.

Dicyano-cobalt(III)-3α,8α,13α-a,b,c,d,e,g-hexamethyl-cobyrinate-f-amide: Identification with material derived from vitamin B_{12}

Concentrated H_{2}SO_{4} at room temperature converted the nitrile function of pure (3α,8α,13α)-E-41/HE-48 into the primary f-amide group of E-42/HE-49, besides partial epimerization at C-13; an alternative procedure for the selective f-nitrile→f-amide conversion (BF_{3} in CH_{3}COOH) later developed at Harvard proceeded without epimerization at C-13. A crystalline sample of the 3α,8α,13α-epimer of dicyano-cobalt (III)-a,b,c,d,e,g-hexamethyl-cobyrinate-f-amide E-42/HE-49, isolated by HPLC, was the first totally synthetic intermediate to be chromatographically and spectroscopically identified with a relay sample made from vitamin B_{12}.

In the remaining steps of the synthesis, only epimerization at C-13 played an important role, with 13α being the configuration of the natural corrinoids, and 13β known as neo-epimers of vitamin B_{12} and its derivatives; these are readily separable by HPLC.

In the course of 1972, comprehensive identifications (HPLC, UV-VIS, IR, NMR, CD, mass spectra) of crystalline samples of totally synthetic intermediates with the corresponding compounds derived from vitamin B_{12} were carried out in both laboratories: individually compared and identified were the 3α,8α,13α and 3α,8α,13β neo-epimer of f-amide E-42/HE-49, as well as the corresponding pair of C-13-epimeric nitriles E-41/HE-48. All these dicyano-cobalt(III)-complexes are soluble in organic solvents in which the separation power of HPLC by far exceeds that of analytical methods operating in water, the solvent in which cobyric acid was to be identified, and where it exists as two easily equilibrating aquo-cyano complexes, epimeric regarding the position of the two non-identical axial Co ligands.

These thorough identifications of the totally synthetic with partially synthetic materials mark the accomplishment of the two syntheses. They also reciprocally provided structure proof for a specific constitutional isomer isolated from a mixture of isomeric mono-amides formed in the partial ammonolysis of the B_{12}-derived cobester, tentatively assigned to be the 3α,8α,13α-f-amide E-42/HE-49 (see fig. 30).

Figure 30 – ETH/Harvard joint final steps, hexamethylcobyrinate-f-amide (synthesis and identification) to cobyric acid

Synthetic cobyric acid

The final task of reaching cobyric acid from f-amide E-42/HE-49 required the critical step of hydrolyzing the singular amide function into a free carboxyl function without touching any of the six methoxycarbonyl groups around the molecule's periphery. Since exploratory attempts by the conventional method of amide hydrolysis via nitrosation led to detrimental side reactions at the chromophore, a novel way of "hydrolyzing" the f-amide group without touching the six methylester groups was conceived and explored at ETH: treatment of f-amide E-42/HE-49 (B_{12}-derived relay material) with the unusual reagent α-chloro-propyl-(N-cyclohexyl)-nitrone and AgBF_{4} in CH_{2}Cl_{2}, then with HCl in H_{2}O/dioxane, and finally with dimethylamine in isopropanol afforded the f-acid E-43/HE-50 in 57% yield. Sustained experimentations at Harvard eventually showed the nitrosation method to be successful (N_{2}O_{4}, CCl_{4}, NaOAc) and to produce the f-carboxyl group even more effectively.

It was also at Harvard that conditions for the last step were explored, conversion of all remaining ester groups into primary amide groups by ammonolysis. Liquid ammonia in ethylene glycol, in the presence of NH_{4}Cl and the absence of oxygen, converted f-carboxy-hexamethylester E-43/HE-50 into f-carboxy-hexa-amide E-44/HE-51 (= cobyric acid). This was crystallized and shown both as the α-cyano-β-aquo and the α-aquo-β-cyano form to be chromatographically and spectroscopically identical with the corresponding forms of natural cobyric acid. At Harvard, the transformation E-43/HE-50 → E-44/HE-51 was eventually carried out starting with f-amide that had been obtained by total synthesis via the A/B approach. The ETH group contented itself with a corresponding f-amide → cobyric acid conversion and subsequent cobyric acid identification where the actual starting material f-amide was derived from vitamin B_{12}.
