= Meso position (tetrapyrrole) =

Bridging positions between pyrrole rings

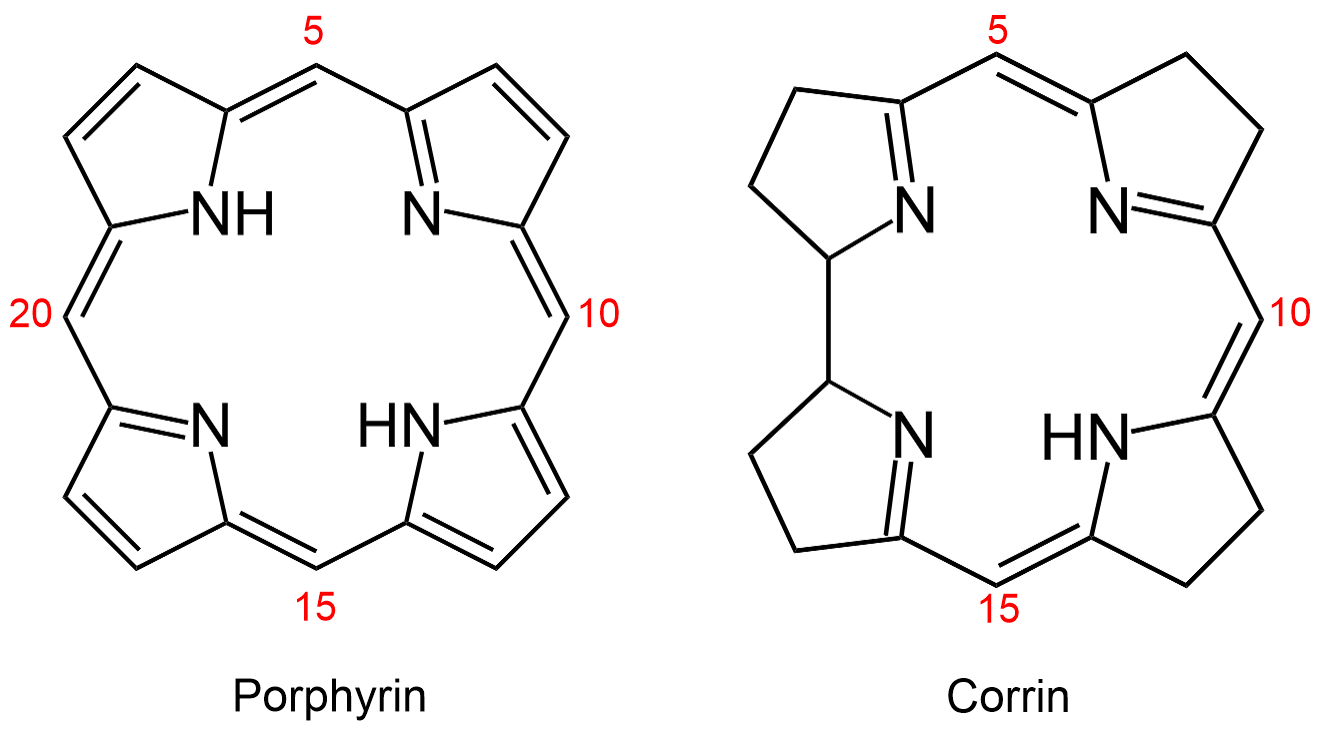
Figure 1. Porphyrin and corrin chromophores (meso positions with red numbers)

A meso position in a cyclic or linear tetrapyrrole is the bridge – a substituted or unsubstituted methine or methylene group (or a heteroatom) – that links two neighboring pyrrole rings. (Note: In trivial names introduced by Hans Fischer for porphyrins (mesoporphyrin), chlorins (e.g., mesochlorophyll a, mesopheophytin a), and bile pigments (mesobiliverdin, mesobilirubin, mesobilirubinogen), still in use, meso has a completely different meaning, signifying the replacement of peripheral vinyl groups by ethyl.) With the unrelated stereochemical classification meso compound, it only shares the meaning "between/middle of/amidst" of the original Greek word "mésos" (fig. 1).

Unsaturated bonds including meso positions play an important role in the natural degradation of the important biomolecules heme and chlorophyll (fig. 2): in heme, both the C4-C5 and C5-C6 bonds are cleaved by heme oxygenase to the linear tetrapyrrole biliverdin, with loss of the C5 meso atom as carbon monoxide; during chlorophyll degradation, pheophorbide a oxygenase (PAO) cleaves the C4-C5 bond of pheophorbide a, conserving the C5 meso atom as a formyl group in type-I phyllobilins (marked red in fig. 2). In further degradation processes, this is either kept, or deformylated by the enzyme CYP89A9 to type-II phyllobilins.

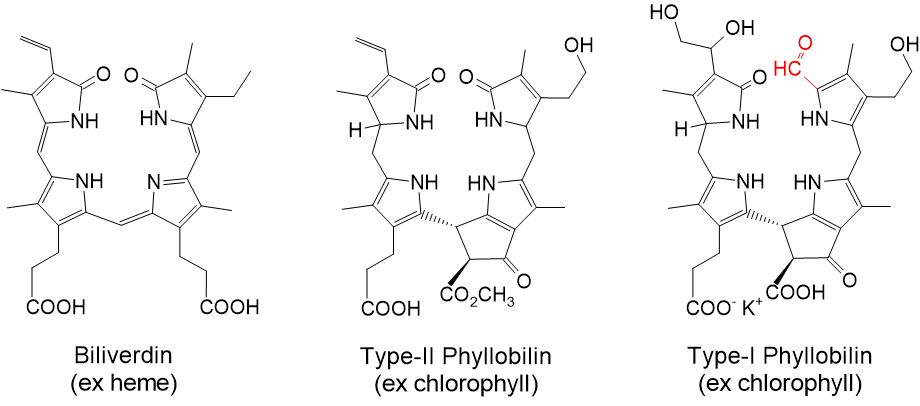
Figure 2. Heme and chlorophyll biological degradation products: biliverdin, two typical phyllobilins

== See also ==
- meso-Octamethylporphyrinogen
- Porphyrin
- Chlorin
- Corrin
- Corrinoid
- Seco (tetrapyrrole)
