= Eschenmoser's salt =

Ionic compound with the formula [(H3C–)2N–CH2]I

- Eschenmoser's salt

Names
- Preferred IUPAC name N,N-Dimethylmethaniminium iodide

Identifiers
CAS Number	33797-51-2 (Iodide); 30354-18-8 (Chloride)
3D model (JSmol)	Interactive image; Interactive image
ChemSpider	2006292
ECHA InfoCard	100.046.968
PubChem CID	2724133
UNII	5C42I004S1
CompTox Dashboard (EPA)	DTXSID10369115
- InChI: InChI=1S/C3H8N.HI/c1-4(2)3;/h1H2,2-3H3;1H/q+1;/p-1 Key: VVDUZZGYBOWDSQ-UHFFFAOYSA-M; InChI=1/C3H8N.HI/c1-4(2)3;/h1H2,2-3H3;1H/q+1;/p-1 Key: VVDUZZGYBOWDSQ-REWHXWOFAW
- SMILES: C[N+](C)=C.[I-]; [I-].[N+](=C)(C)C

Properties
Chemical formula	C_{3}H_{8}NI
Molar mass	185.01 g/mol
Appearance	colorless hygroscopic crystals
Melting point	116 °C (241 °F; 389 K)
Solubility in water	decomposes

Hazards
- GHS labelling
Pictograms	(GHS07: Exclamation mark)
Signal word	Warning
Hazard statements	H315, H319, H335
Precautionary statements	P261, P264, P271, P280, P302+P352, P304+P340, P305+P351+P338, P312, P321, P332+P313, P337+P313, P362, P403+P233, P405, P501
- Except where otherwise noted, data are given for materials in their standard state (at 25 °C [77 °F], 100 kPa). verify (what is ?) Infobox references

In organic chemistry, Eschenmoser's salt (named for Albert Eschenmoser) is the ionic, organic compound [(CH_{3})_{2}NCH_{2}]I. It is the iodide salt of the dimethylaminomethylene cation [(CH_{3})_{2}NCH_{2}]^{+}.

The dimethylaminomethylene cation is a strong dimethylaminomethylating agent, used to prepare derivatives of the type RCH_{2}N(CH_{3})_{2}. Enolates, silyl enol ethers, and even more acidic ketones undergo efficient dimethylaminomethylation. Once prepared, such tertiary amines can be further methylated and then subjected to base-induced elimination to afford methylidenated ketones. The salt was first prepared by the group of Albert Eschenmoser after whom the reagent is named.

== Structure and bonding ==
Dimethylaminomethylene cation is described as a resonance hybrid of the carbocation and an iminium cation:

(CH_{3})_{2}N−CH^{+}_{2} ↔ (CH_{3})_{2}N^{+}=CH_{2}

The C_{3}N atoms are coplanar. The cation is isoelectronic with isobutene.

== Preparation ==
Pyrolysis of iodomethyltrimethylammonium iodide affords the desired salt:

[(CH_{3})_{3}N^{+}−CH_{2}I]I^{−} → [(CH_{3})_{2}N^{+}=CH_{2}]I^{−} + CH_{3}I

An alternative route starts with bis(dimethylamino)methane:

[(CH_{3})_{2}N]_{2}CH_{2} + (CH_{3})_{3}SiI → [(CH_{3})_{2}N^{+}=CH_{2}]I^{−} + (CH_{3})_{3}SiN(CH_{3})_{2}

== Related salts ==
Other salts of the dimethylaminomethylene cation:

- Dimethyl(methylidene)ammonium trifluoroacetate.
- Dimethyl(methylidene)ammonium chloride (Böhme's salt, after Horst Böhme)

== See also ==
- Vilsmeier reagent, [(CH_{3})_{2}NCHCl]Cl.
