= Carbomethoxymethylenetriphenylphosphorane =

Names
- Preferred IUPAC name Methyl (triphenyl-λ^{5}-phosphanylidene)acetate

Identifiers
| CAS Number | 2605-67-6 |
| 3D model (JSmol) | Interactive image |
| ChEMBL | ChEMBL1715161 |
| ChemSpider | 16508 |
| EC Number | 220-018-4 |
| PubChem CID | 17453 |
| UNII | D9MZ753Q8K |
- InChI: InChI=1S/C21H19O2P/c1-23-21(22)17-24(18-11-5-2-6-12-18,19-13-7-3-8-14-19)20-15-9-4-10-16-20/h2-17H,1H3 Key: NTNUDYROPUKXNA-UHFFFAOYSA-N
- SMILES: COC(=O)C=P(C1=CC=CC=C1)(C2=CC=CC=C2)C3=CC=CC=C3

Hazards
- GHS labelling
| Pictograms | (GHS07: Exclamation mark) (GHS06: Toxic) |
| Signal word | Danger |
| Hazard statements | H301, H315, H319, H335 |
| Precautionary statements | P261, P264, P270, P271, P280, P302+P352, P304+P340, P305+P351+P338, P321, P330, P362+P364, P403+P233, P405, P501 |
- Except where otherwise noted, data are given for materials in their standard state (at 25 °C [77 °F], 100 kPa). Infobox references

Carbomethoxymethylenetriphenylphosphorane is a chemical compound used in organic syntheses. It contains a phosphorus atom bound to three phenyl groups, and doubly bound to the alpha position of methyl acetate. It undergoes a Wittig reaction. It is used in the Vitamin B12 total synthesis.

== Production ==
Carbomethoxymethylenetriphenylphosphorane can be made via a multistep reaction using bromoacetic acid, dicyclohexylcarbodiimide, and triphenylphosphine. This makes a phosphonium salt, which is converted to the final product by sodium carbonate in water.

== Reactions ==
Carbomethoxymethylenetriphenylphosphorane reacts with aldehydes to give a two carbon atom extension. The carbomethoxymethylene group replaces the oxygen of the aldehyde to give a trans- double bond.
