= Phyllobilins =

Linear tetrapyrroles from chlorophyll degradation

Phyllobilins (PBs) are linear tetrapyrroles generated by the metabolic breakdown of chlorophyll in plants. They are products of the pheophorbide a oxygenase/phyllobilin (PAO/PB) pathway of natural chlorophyll breakdown, and are distantly related to the bilins resulting from heme breakdown, such as bilirubin. Chlorophyll breakdown is a massive phenomenon, most visual when the fall colors arise, producing each year about 10^{9} tons of PBs worldwide. Strikingly, despite its obvious importance, chlorophyll breakdown has long remained enigmatic, as the search for its expected tetrapyrrolic products has been futile. By 1991, organic chemist Bernhard Kräutler, botanist Philippe Matile, and their teams succeeded in unambiguously identifying a first chlorophyll catabolite from plants (then called RP-14) and elucidating its striking structure. This first, colorless PB from de-greened cotyledons of barley (Hordeum vulgare) was classified as a non-fluorescent chlorophyll catabolite (NCC) and given the provisional name Hv-NCC-1 (fig. 1). A colorless, but fluorescent PB found in oil seed rape, subsequently characterized and named "primary" FCC (pFCC), is a formal precursor of Hv-NCC-1, and has a structure more similar to pheophorbide a (Pheo a). The pFCC-structure highlights the critical cleavage of the porphyrinoid macrocycle of chlorophyll (fig. 1) in the course of chlorophyll breakdown in plants.

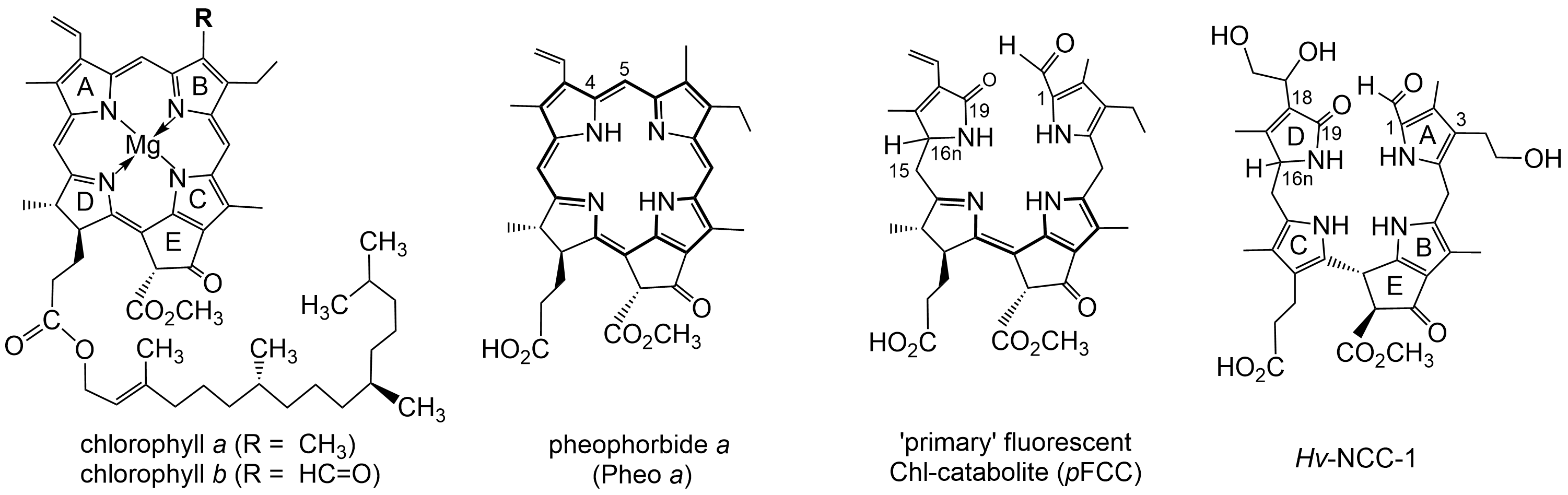
Figure 1. Chlorophylls a and b; pheophorbide a (Pheo a) and two colorless phyllobilins (PBs) (chromophores marked in bold) identified as natural chlorphyll (Chl) degradation products. PBs are depicted in a pseudo-cyclic presentation, with bilin-type atom numbering and ring labelling, different from that in chlorophylls

== Nomenclature ==
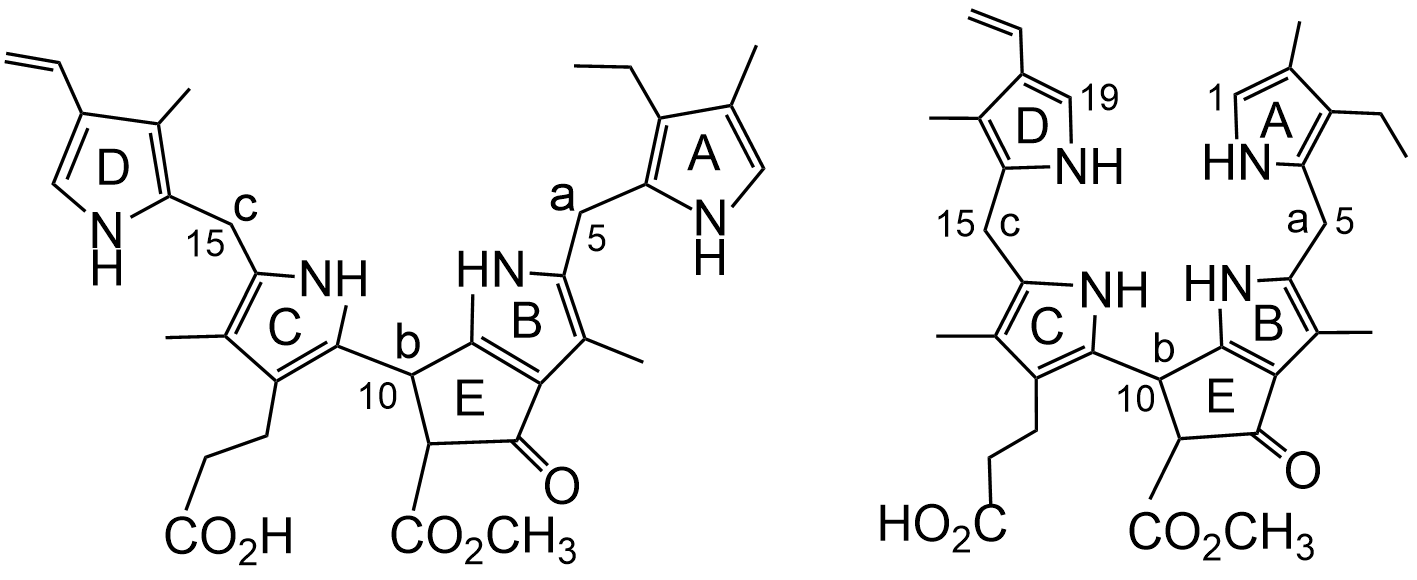
Figure 2. Name-giving phyllobilane core element, displayed in stretched (left) and in pseudo-cyclic presentation (right)

Original names of the PBs have been phenomenological, short acronyms, specifying their plant source and structure-type, such as Hv-NCC-1. A structure-based nomenclature named the tetrapyrrolic chlorophyll catabolites as 4,5-dioxo-4,5-seco-phytoporphyrinates, i.e., as between C4 and C5 ring-opened derivatives of Pheo a. Accordingly, pFCC is a 3^{1},3^{2}-didehydro-1,4,5,10,17,18,20-(22H)-octahydro-13^{2}-methoxycarbonyl-4,5-dioxo-4,5-seco-phytoporphyrinate. Since 2014, when linear tetrapyrroles from Chl-breakdown were classified as "phyllobilins" (PBs) by Kräutler, previous names were replaced by a phyllobilane-based semi-systematic nomenclature (fig. 2), (Note: Phyllobilin (PB) is used as a generic name for the entire class of tetrapyrrolic chlorophyll catabolites from plants in analogy to bilin: colorless, non-fluorescing phyllobilanes (NCCs, DNCCs), featuring completely deconjugated pyrrole rings, were also classified as phylloleucobilins; the partially deconjugated phyllobilenes-b (fluorescing FCCs, hmFCCs, DFCCs) as phyllolumibilins; partially deconjugated phyllobilenes-c (YCCs, DYCCs) as phylloxanthobilins; phyllobiladienes-b,c (PiCCs, DPiCCs) as phylloroseobilins. – Phyllobilins are not to be mixed up with phycobilins and phytobilins, which are heme-degradation products originating biosynthetically from biliverdin, and are unsaturated, conjugated linear tetrapyrroles used as chromophores to capture light in photosynthetic and (as phytochromes) in photoregulatory processes.) as recommended for linear tetrapyrroles by the International Union of Pure and Applied Chemistry (e.g., for the heme-derived bilins). In consequence, pFCC is a (10Z)-1-formyl-19-oxo-12,13,16,19-tetrahydro-phyllobilene-b.

With the discovery of two 1,19-dioxo-phyllobilins that were structurally related to Hv-NCC-1, a puzzling altered type of phyllobilins became known (2001, 2011), to be established (only in 2013) as first representatives of an important second branch of chlorophyll breakdown in some plants. Since then, PBs are classified either as type-I PBs (1-formyl-19-oxo-phyllobilins), or as type-II PBs (1,19-dioxo-phyllobilins). Nowadays, over 80 different natural PBs (including their synthetic metal complexes) are known.

== Colorless phyllolumibilins and phylloleucobilins ==
The two basic types of the important colorless phyllobilins in plants are the (nonfluorescent) phylloleucobilins and (fluorescent) phyllolumibilins. They carry a remarkable variety of functional groups at the periphery of their tetrapyrrole cores, typically increasing their polarity (fig. 3 and table). The colorless PBs represent the major group of the known natural PBs. A hydroxyl group attached at C3^{2} is the first one of the substituents introduced at the stage of the primary FCCs (pFCCs), giving the corresponding secondary FCCs (sFCCs). Further modifications are deduced to furnish a variety of modified FCCs (mFCCs, fig. 3). In fact, typical FCCs are only fleetingly existent catabolites and isomerize non-enzymatically in aqueous environment to the corresponding NCCs, 8^{2}S,10R-isomers, as, e.g., Hv-NCC-1. Hence, with few exceptions, the peripheral modifications were only detected in NCCs (figs. 1, 3).

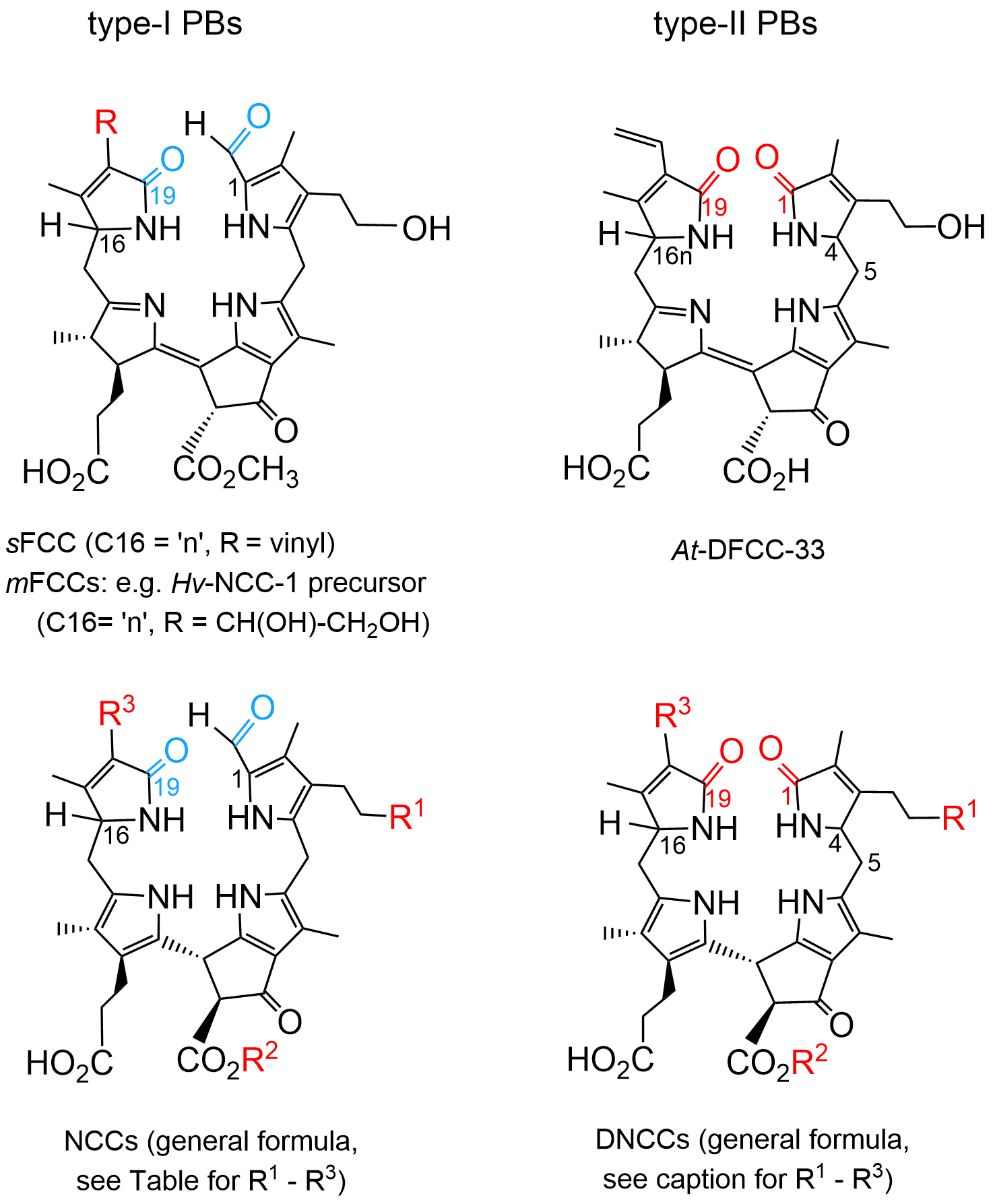
Figure 3. Chemical formulas of colorless type-I PBs and type-II PBs in pseudo-cyclic presentation. Fluorescent phyllolumibilins (top): secondary FCC (sFCC), hypothetical modified FCCs (mFCCs) and DFCCs (e.g., At-DFCC-33); bottom: corresponding non-fluorescent phylloleucobilins: NCCs (see table for R^{1}–R^{3}) and DNCCs (R^{1} = H, OH; R^{2} = H, CH_{3}; R^{3} = vinyl, CH(OH)-CH_{2}(OH))

Major substitution patterns of NCCs (see general formula in fig. 3)
R^{1}	R^{2}	R^{3}	Original name
H	H	CH=CH_{2}	Bo-NCC-2
H	H	CH=CH_{2}	At-NCC-3^{[a]}
H	CH_{3}	CH=CH_{2}	Cj-NCC-2
OH	H	CH=CH_{2}	Bn-NCC-3
OH	H	CH(OH)-CH_{2}OH	So-NCC-1
OH	CH_{3}	CH=CH_{2}	Cj-NCC-1
OH	CH_{3}	CH(OH)-CH_{2}OH	Hv-NCC-1
O-Glc^{[b]}	H	CH=CH_{2}	Bn-NCC-2
O-Glc	CH_{3}	CH=CH_{2}	Nr-NCC-2
O-Glc	CH_{3}	CH(OH)-CH_{2}OH	Zm-NCC-1
O-Glc	CH_{3}	CH(OH)-CH_{2}O-Glc	Pd-NCC-32
O-Mal^{[c]}	H	CH=CH_{2}	Bn-NCC-1
O-MalGlc	CH_{3}	CH=CH_{2}	Nr-NCC-1
[a] Exceptionally, At-NCC-3 carries a CH_{2}-OH group at C2 (instead of methyl); [b] Glc = β-D-glucopyranosyl; [c] Mal = malonyl
Source species: At = Arabidopsis thaliana, Bn = Brassica napus, Bo = Brassica oleracea var. Italica, Cj = Cercidiphyllum japonicum, Hv = Hordeum vulgare, Nr = Nicotiana rustica, Pd = Prunus domestica ssp. domestica, So = Spinacia oleracea, Zm = Zea mays

When pFCC was identified, its configuration at C16 could not be characterized, and was later classified provisionally as n. In fact, the "primary" FCCs are generated plant-specifically, either as pFCC, C16n (fig. 1), or as epi-pFCC, with epi-configuration at C16, and both C16-epimeric FCCs exist naturally. Hydroxylation at C3^{2} of the respective primary FCC occurs irrespective of its C16 configuration: sFCC is derived from pFCC, epi-sFCC from epi-pFCC. NCCs inherit their configuration at C16 from their precursor FCCs; hence, Hv-NCC-1 is C16n, as it is derived from pFCC via sFCC.

Oxidative removal of the 1-formyl function of the sFCC was deduced to generate the sDFCC, the cryptic natural methyl ester that is rapidly demethylated enzymatically (in Arabidopsis thaliana) to At-DFCC-33, a first DFCC, actually isolated from a leaf (fig. 3). At-DFCC-33 isomerizes rapidly to the corresponding DNCC, opening up access to further downstream 1,19-dioxo-phyllobilins in A. thaliana. In view of the existence of two important breakdown paths, the PBs are now classified either as type-I PBs (1-formyl-19-oxo-phyllobilins) or as type-II PBs (1,19-dioxo-phyllobilins).

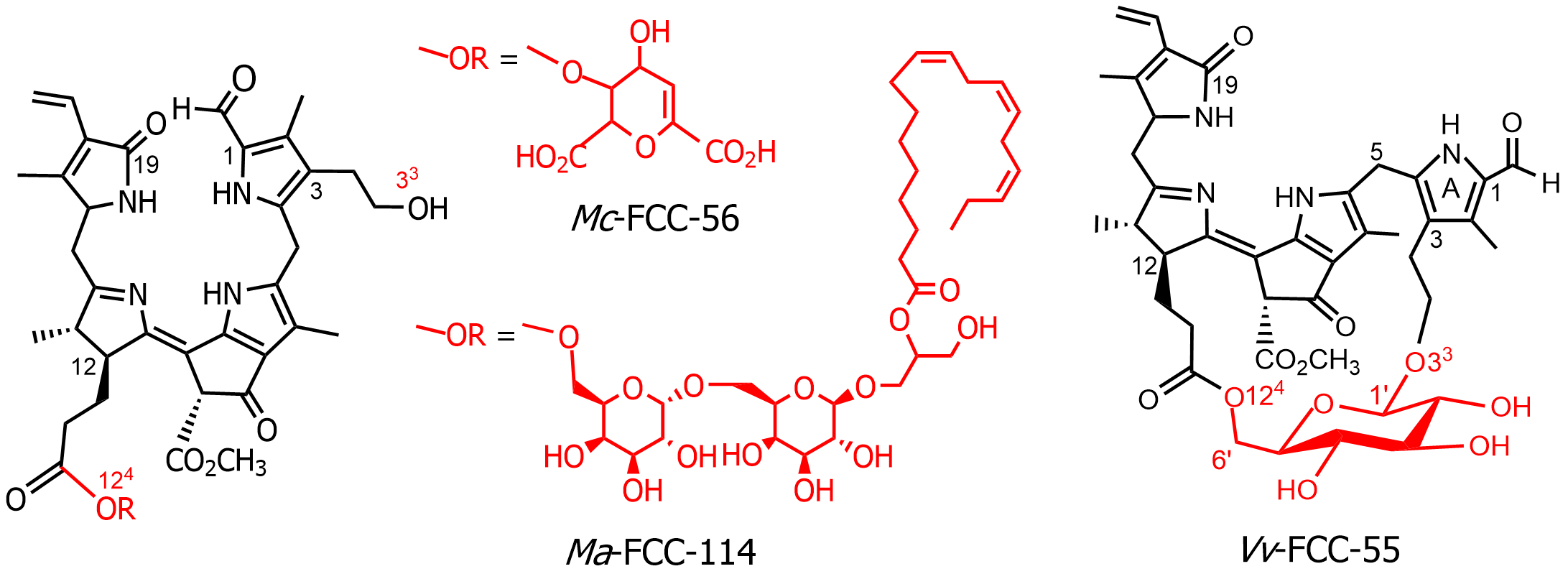
Figure 4. Chemical formulas of representative hmFCCs from bananas: Mc-FCC-56 (from fruit) and Ma-FCC-114 (from leaf) of Musa acuminata, in pseudo-cyclic presentation (left), and of the fluorescent bicyclo-phyllobilin (Vv-FCC-55) from grapevine leaves (Vitis vinifera) having a bicyclo-glycoside appendage (right)

In contrast to typical FCCs (fig. 3), so called hypermodified fluorescent FCCs (hmFCCs), first discovered in ripening bananas as, e.g., Mc-FCC-56, (fig. 4) are uniquely persistent. They accumulate as blue fluorescent natural "optical brighteners" in some ripening fruit, a particularly intriguing feature of de-greened banana fruits, and in senescent banana leaves. Among the hmFCCs, lipophilic derivatives have been found, such as Ma-FCC-114 that contains parts of a main chloroplast membrane constituent.

An exceptional hmFCC variant is represented by phyllolumibilins with a bicyclo-glycoside appendage, such as Vv-FCC-55, isolated from grapevine leaves. In this phyllolumibilin, a 1',6'-glucose link is "bridging" between its carboxyl-O12^{4} and hydroxyl-O3^{3} in a remarkable macrocycle (fig. 4 right).

== Colored phyllobilins: phyllochromobilins ==
The first natural phyllochromobilins detected in senescent leaves are yellow chlorophyll catabolites (YCCs, fig. 5), observed in extracts of degreened leaves of the deciduous tree Cercidiphyllum japonicum. One of these YCCs, named Cj-YCC-2, has also become accessible effectively by partial chemical oxidation of its natural precursor, Cj-NCC-1. In a similar way, DYCCs have been prepared from DNCCs, using chemical or endogenous, natural synthesis with homogenates of senescent leaves. YCCs and DYCCs represent the class of phylloxanthobilins. Their more stable Z-isomers exhibit very similar blue light absorption with a maximum near 430 nm. Phylloxanthobilins (Z/E) photo-isomerize readily at their C15-C16 double bond, similar to their analog bilirubin.

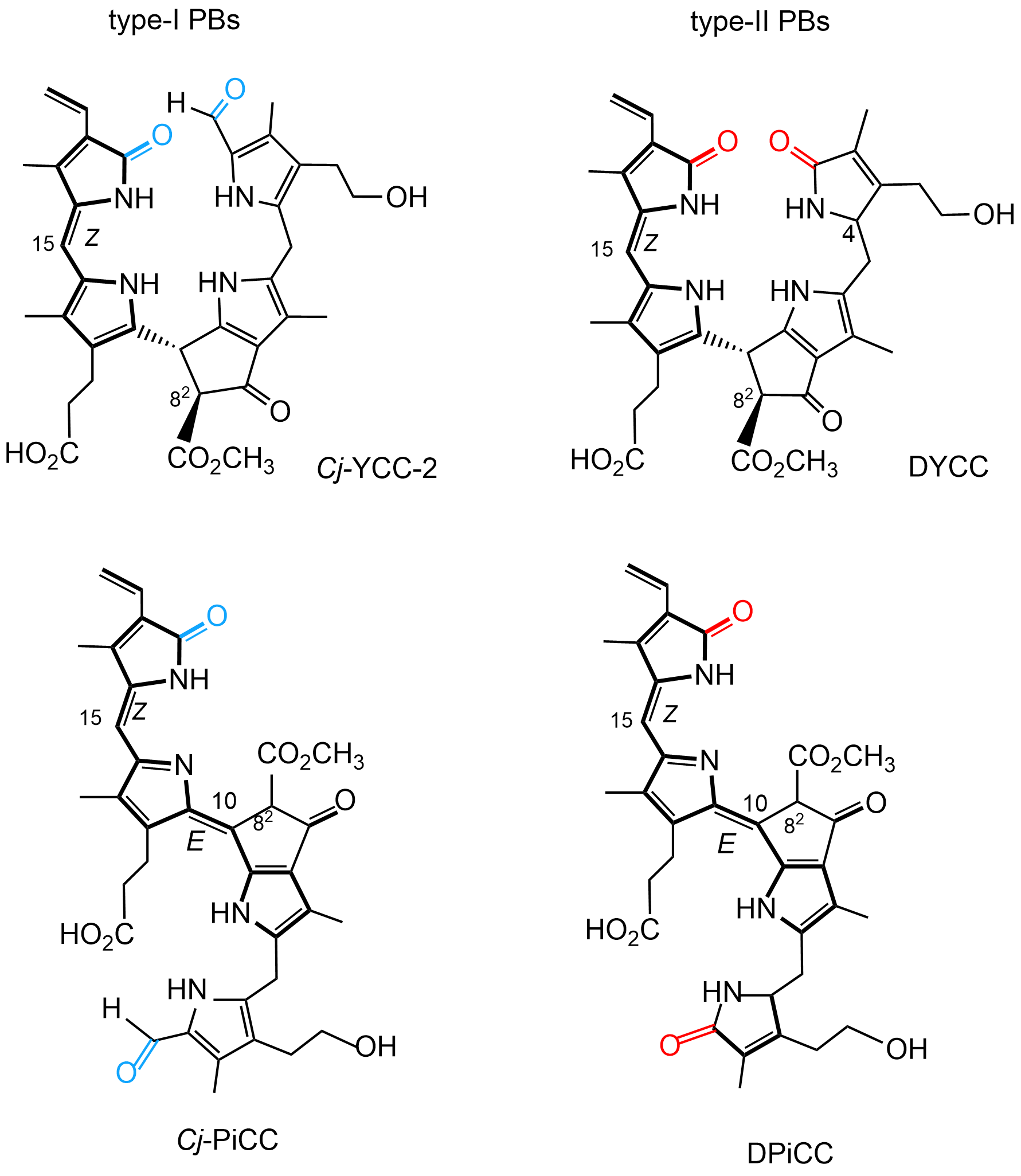
Figure 5. Representative phyllochromobilins, type-I PBs (left) and type-II PBs (right), shown with chromophores marked in bold. Top: 15Z-isomers of yellow chlorophyll catabolites (YCCs and DYCCs) depicted in pseudo-cyclic display; bottom: pink PiCCs and DPiCCs presented in their main 10E,15Z- conformation

Phylloxanthobilins (YCCs and DYCCs) are excellent antioxidants, and their air oxidation generates pink phylloroseobilins (type-I PiCCs and type-II DPiCCs) (fig. 5) absorbing light near 520 nm. The oxidation of the Zn-complex of Cj-YCC-2 leads to the corresponding Zn-PiCC, which loses its Zn-ion upon treatment with phosphate, providing an efficient path to pure Cj-PiCC. The type-II phylloroseobilin DPiCC was synthesized analogously from the corresponding DYCC.

When isolated pure, several phyllochromobilins could be crystallized. This allowed for the first x-ray crystal structure analysis of a chlorophyll-derived PB from a higher plant, carried out with Cj-PiCC. It confirmed its spectroscopically derived structure, giving detailed insights into the actual molecular geometry of the PiCC as 10E,15Z-isomer. Another crystal structure determination dealt with the methyl ester of Cj-YCC-2, confirming the stereochemical assignment of this YCC as a 10Z-isomer, and establishing its (R)-configuration at C10. Simultaneously, this analysis provided convincing evidence for the 8^{2}(S) and the earlier proposed 10(R) stereochemistry in the prevailing epimers of natural NCCs (see fig. 5). Likewise, a first crystal structure of a pyro-YCC, lacking the chlorophyll-typical methyl ester group at C8^{2} (see fig. 5), was determined. The two YCC crystal structures showed dimers with "double-decker arrangements" due to π-stacking of the conjugated system spanning rings C and D (fig. 5), assisted by hydrogen bonding. Depending on the polarity of the solvent, this stacking in dimers was also observed in solution by ^{1}H NMR.

== Phyllobilin metal complexes ==
While complexation of NCCs and DNCCs has not been observed (nor expected), phyllochromobilins are excellent ligands for transition-metal ions. Phylloroseobilins bind the metal ions Zn^{2+} and Cd^{2+} particularly well in monomeric blue complexes that exhibit a strong red fluorescence: M(II)-PiCCs (M=Zn, Cd, Ni, Cu), and Zn(II)-DpiCCs. Zn(II) ions coordinate the methyl ester of Cj-YCC-2, a bidentate ligand, in a 2:1 assembly.

== Iso-phyllobilanones (iPBs): PBs with a rearranged backbone ==
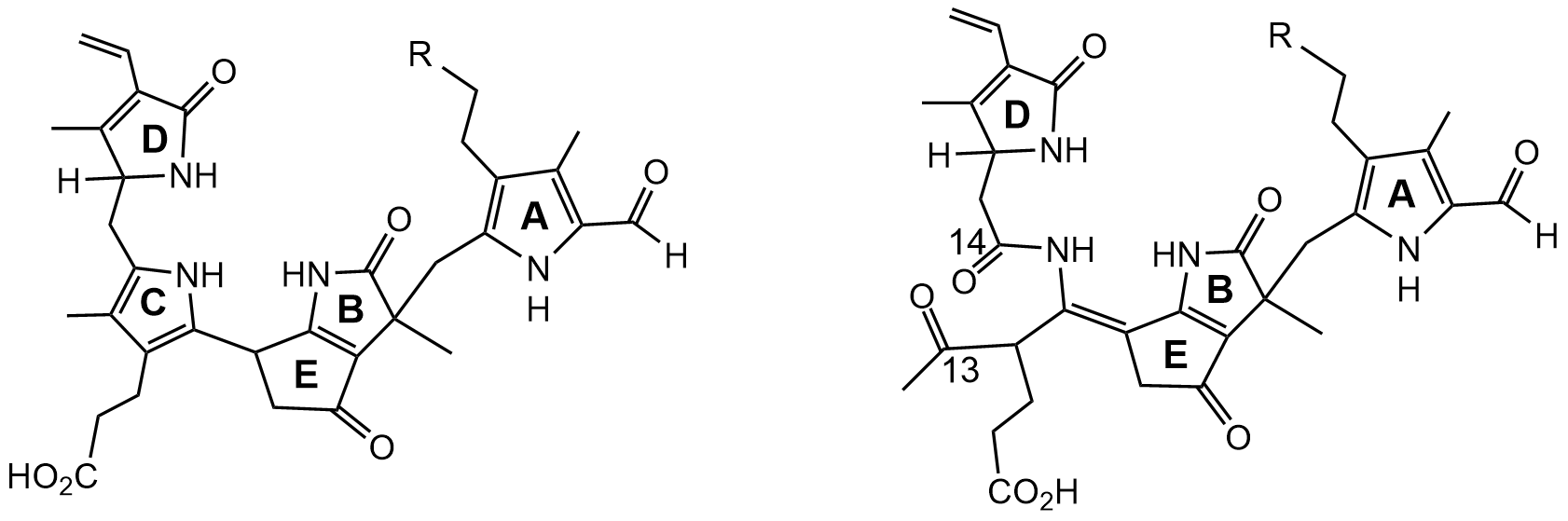
Figure 6. iso-Phyllobilanones (iPBs; R = H, OH) with re-arranged ring B (left), and a 12,13-dioxo-12,13-seco-iPB from further oxidative opening of ring C (right)

Instead of the common PBs found in angiosperms, in the cryptogam eagle fern, first representative iso-phyllobilanones (iPBs) have been found, featuring a second basic carbon backbone in chlorophyll catabolites. It displays a rearranged tetrapyrrole skeleton, with ring B linked to ring A at the β-carbon and transformed into a five-membered-ring lactam. It also lacks the carboxylate functions at ring E of the known natural PBs from higher plants (fig. 6). Other iPBs from the fern are strikingly reactive 12,13-dioxo-12,13-seco-iPBs (siPBs), in which the (former) ring C is also cleaved (fig. 6 ).

iPB structures show the exact cleavage pattern of the chlorophyll macrocycle characteristic for PBs from angiosperms and are further restructured by the C6-C7 oxidative rearrangement. However, they lack most of the typical further modifications of the PBs from angiosperms. iPBs are considered to reflect evolutionary developments of chlorophyll breakdown in green plants in the Paleozoic era.

== Biological activities of phyllobilins ==
Originally, chlorophyll breakdown was rationalized in simple terms as a detoxification process. However, ripening of most fruits that we eat is accompanied by degreening, i.e., breakdown of chlorophyll, and the appearance of appealing colors. In consequence, attention was given to the chlorophyll catabolites in ripening apples and pears. They were found to be NCCs identical to those from senescent leaves. When tested in a standard autoxidation experiment of a type used for the analysis of bilirubin, a known antioxidant, NCCs were found to be only slightly inferior to the latter and their consumption was proposed to be potentially beneficial for human health.

The massive amounts of diverse PBs generated by chlorophyll breakdown are nowadays understood differently, considering the intriguing bioactivities that PBs may have: they are investigated as a natural product class with biologically, chemically and pharmacologically interesting properties. In pioneering work by Simone Moser and her group, biologically active and pharmacologically interesting linear tetrapyrroles have been investigated with respect to their antioxidative, immunomodulatory, anti-inflammatory, and anti-cancer activities, in particular.
