= Eschenmoser sulfide contraction =

Organic reaction method

The Eschenmoser sulfide contraction is an organic reaction first described by Albert Eschenmoser for the synthesis of 1,3-dicarbonyl compounds from a thioester. The method requires a base and a tertiary phosphine. The method is of some relevance to organic chemistry and has been notably applied in the vitamin B_{12} total synthesis.

A base abstracts the labile hydrogen atom in the thioester, a sulfide anion is formed through an episulfide intermediate which is removed by the phosphine.

== Scope ==
The Eschenmoser sulfide contraction method has been employed in a number of total synthesis efforts, like that of fuligocandin A and B, cocaine, diplodialide A and isoretronecanol

An example of general synthetic utility is the synthesis of novel carbapenems
