= Albert Eschenmoser =

Swiss organic chemist (1925–2023)

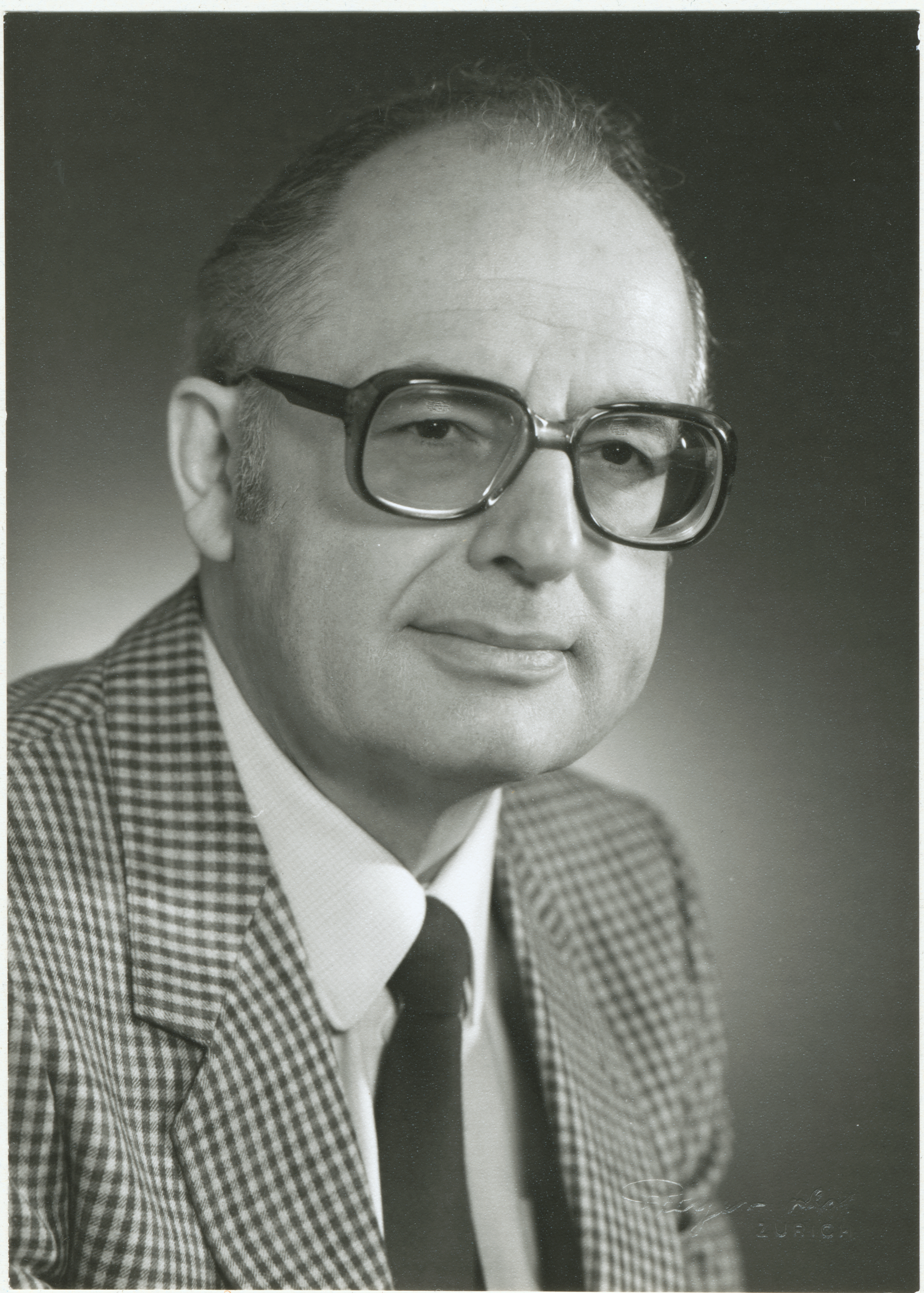
- Born: 5 August 1925; Erstfeld, Switzerland
- Died: 14 July 2023 (aged 97); Küsnacht, Switzerland
- Education: ETH Zurich
- Known for: Eschenmoser's salt Eschenmoser fragmentation Eschenmoser sulfide contraction Eschenmoser–Claisen rearrangement Synthesis of vitamin B_{12} (along with Woodward)
- Awards: Ernest Guenther Award (1966); Marcel Benoist Prize (1972); Davy Medal (1978); Wolf Prize in Chemistry (1986)
- Scientific career
- Fields: Organic chemistry
- Workplaces: ETH Zurich
- Thesis: Zur säurekatalysierten Zyklisierung bei Mono- und Sesquiterpenverbindungen (1952)
- Doctoral advisor: Lavoslav Ružička
- Doctoral students: Scott E. Denmark; Ernst-Ludwig Winnacker; Andreas Pfaltz; Bernhard Kräutler

Albert Jakob Eschenmoser (5 August 1925 – 14 July 2023) was a Swiss organic chemist, best known for his work on the synthesis of complex heterocyclic natural compounds, most notably vitamin B_{12}. In addition to his significant contributions to the field of organic synthesis, Eschenmoser pioneered work in the Origins of Life (OoL) field with work on the synthetic pathways of artificial nucleic acids. Before retiring in 2009, Eschenmoser held tenured teaching positions at the ETH Zurich and The Skaggs Institute for Chemical Biology at The Scripps Research Institute in La Jolla, California as well as visiting professorships at the University of Chicago, Cambridge University, and Harvard.

== Early work and vitamin B_{12} synthesis ==
Eschenmoser began his scientific career as a graduate student in the laboratory of Leopold Ružička, at the Eidgenossische Technische Hochschule (ETH) in Zurich. Ruzicka was a notable organic chemist himself having been awarded the Nobel Prize in Chemistry in 1939 for his work on the synthesis of androsterone and testosterone. Eschenmoser's early work on the cyclization of unsaturated, conjugated hydrocarbons directly contributed to advances in the field of terpene chemistry and provided insight into steroid biosynthesis.

A/D-corrin-ring closure by photochemical A/D-seco-corrin→corrin cycloisomerization, key step in the ETH Zurich A/D variant of the total synthesis of vitamin B_{12}

In the early 1960s, having become Professor of General Organic Chemistry at ETH, Eschenmoser began work on what was the most complex natural product synthesized at the time—vitamin B_{12}. In a remarkable collaboration with his colleague Robert Burns Woodward at Harvard University, a team of almost one hundred students and postdoctoral workers worked for many years on the total synthesis of this molecule. At the time, a significant obstacle to the synthesis of vitamin B_{12} had been the difficulty in the final macrocyclic ring closure necessary to complete the corrin ring structure at the center of the molecule. Eschenmoser and his collaborators discovered methods under which such bonds between corrin ring building blocks could be formed, including a novel photochemical process which established the final junction of rings A and D with a high degree of stereospecificity, the key step in what was dubbed the "A/D variant" of the syntheses. Both the Harvard/ETH "A/B variant" and the ETH "A/D variant" of the syntheses were jointly and concomitantly completed in 1972, and they marked a landmark in the history of organic chemistry.

The Eschenmoser fragmentation, Eschenmoser–Claisen rearrangement, Eschenmoser sulfide contraction, and Eschenmoser's salt are named after him.

== Origins of Life (OoL) research ==
A particularly vexing question in the study of the chemical origins of life is the selection of ribose, which forms the backbone of the nucleic acids found in modern biological systems. Eschenmoser's work on a variant of the formose reaction that produces phosphorylated ribose in relatively significant concentrations has provided significant insight. Eschenmoser and colleagues demonstrated that phosphorylated glycolaldehyde when condensed with glyceraldehyde (a product of successive formaldehyde condensations) produces phosphorylated ribose differentially, providing a plausible explanation for the origin of both the sugar ribose, and the phosphate group required to polymerize monomeric nucleotides, in modern biochemistry.

== TNA and artificial nucleic acids ==
Eschenmoser developed synthetic pathways for artificial nucleic acids, specifically modifying the sugar backbone of the polymer. Having developed a number of structural alternatives to the naturally occurring nucleic acids, Eschenmoser and his colleagues were able to contrast the properties of these synthetic nucleic acids with naturally occurring ones to effectively determine the properties of RNA and DNA vital to modern biochemical processes. This work demonstrated that hydrogen-bonding interactions between the base-paring surfaces of the nucleobases alone might not have provided sufficient selection pressure to lead to the eventual rise of ribose in the structure of modern nucleic acids. He determined that pentose sugars, particularly ribose, conform to a geometry that contributes significantly to the helical structure of DNA by optimizing base-pair stacking distances in naturally occurring oligonucleotides. These base-stacking interactions orient and stabilize the base-paring surfaces of the nucleobases (A, G, C, T or U in RNA) and give rise to the canonical Watson-Crick base-paring rules that are well understood today.

Threose nucleic acid is an artificial genetic polymer invented by Eschenmoser. TNA strings composed of repeating threose sugars linked together by phosphodiester bonds. Like DNA and RNA, the molecule TNA can store genetic information in strings of nucleotide sequences. John Chaput, a professor at UC Irvine, has theorized that issues concerning the prebiotic synthesis of ribose sugars and the non-enzymatic replication of RNA may provide circumstantial evidence of an earlier genetic system more readily produced under primitive earth conditions. TNA could have been an early pre-DNA genetic system.

== Death ==
Eschenmoser died on 14 July 2023, at the age of 97 in Küsnacht.

Before, he had finished writing his autobiography (in German), and supervised its translation into English, which was "after his passing, prepared for publication" by a four-person team of former students and friends. This book was launched at ETH Zurich on June 6, 2025, at the Eschenmoser Symposium 2025 "Organic Chemistry Frontiers: A Celebration of Albert Eschenmoser's 100th Birthday."

== Awards ==
- Kern Prize of the ETH Zurich (1949)
- Werner Prize of the Swiss Chemical Society (1956)
- Ruzicka Prize of the ETH Zurich (1958)
- Fritzsche Award (1966)
- Welch Award (1974)
- Kirkwood Medal, Yale University (1976)
- Davy Medal (1978)
- Tetrahedron Prize for Creativity in Organic Chemistry (1981)
- Arthur C. Cope Award (1984)
- Wolf Prize in Chemistry of the Wolf Foundation (1986)
- Cothenius Medal (1991)
- Pour le Mérite for Sciences and Arts (Foreign member, 1992)
- Austrian Cross of Honour for Science and Art (Foreign member, 1993)
- Nakanishi Prize (1998)
- Oparin Medal (2002)
- Frank H. Westheimer Medal (Harvard University (2004)
- F.A. Cotton Medal for Excellence in Chemical Research of the American Chemical Society (2004)
- Paul Karrer Gold Medal (University of Zurich, 2008)
- Benjamin Franklin Medal in Chemistry from the Franklin Institute in Philadelphia, Pennsylvania (2008)

=== Honorary doctorates ===
- University of Fribourg (Switzerland, 1966)
- University of Chicago (US, 1970)
- University of Edinburgh (United Kingdom, 1979)
- University of Bologna (Italy, 1989)
- Goethe University Frankfurt (Germany, 1990)
- Louis Pasteur University (France, 1991)
- Harvard University (US, 1993)
- Scripps Research Institute (US, 2000)
- University of Innsbruck (Austria, 2010)
