= Plant senescence =

Process of aging in plants

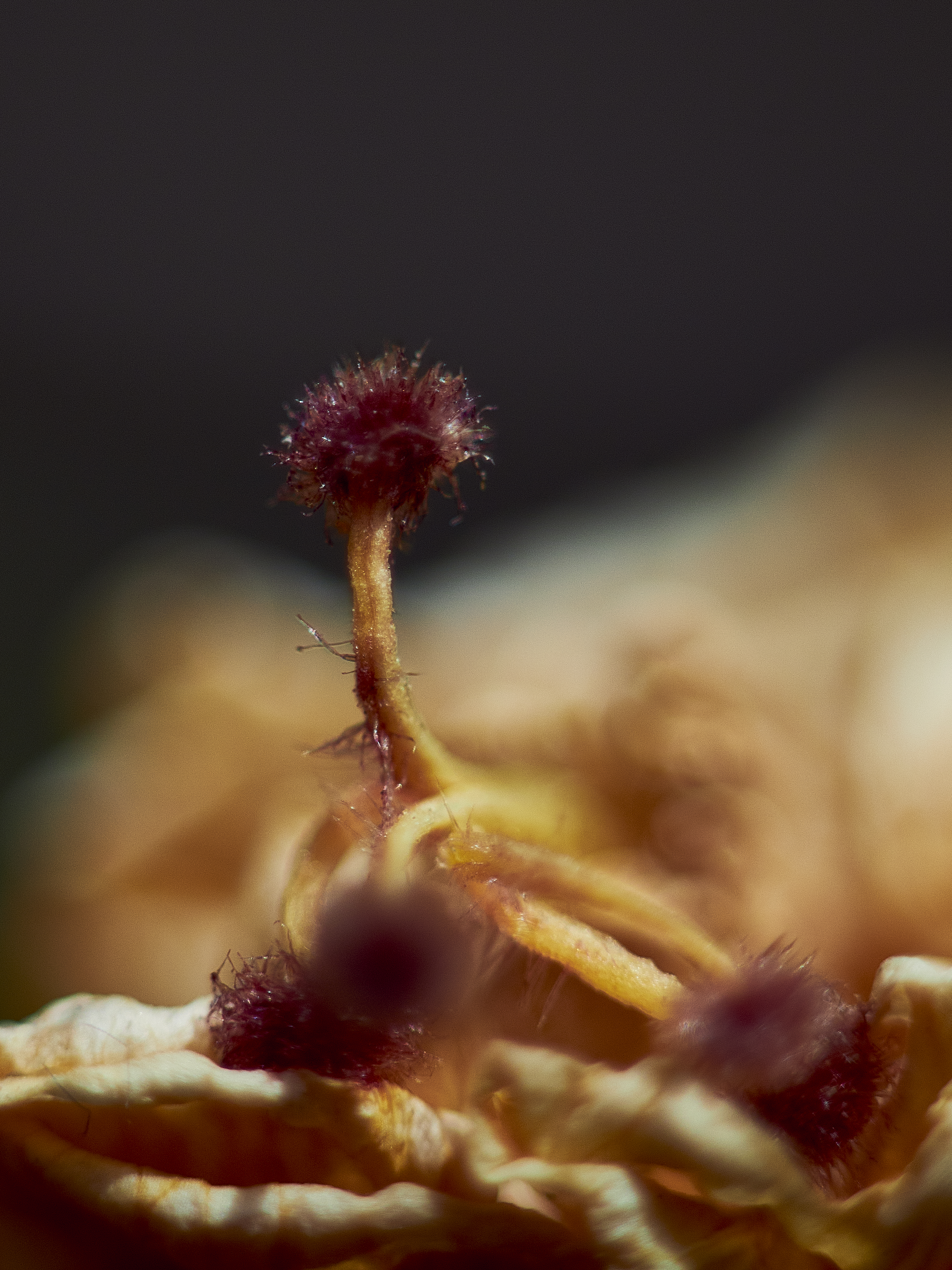
An extreme macro showing the persistence of the red stigma tissue during the floral senescence phase of a dead Hibiscus flower

Plant senescence is the process of aging in plants. Plants have both stress-induced and age-related developmental aging. Chlorophyll degradation during leaf senescence reveals the carotenoids such as xanthophylls, which are the cause of autumn leaf color in deciduous trees. Leaf senescence has the important function of recycling nutrients, mostly nitrogen, to growing and storage organs of the plant. Unlike animals, plants continually form new organs and older organs undergo a highly regulated senescence program to maximize nutrient export.

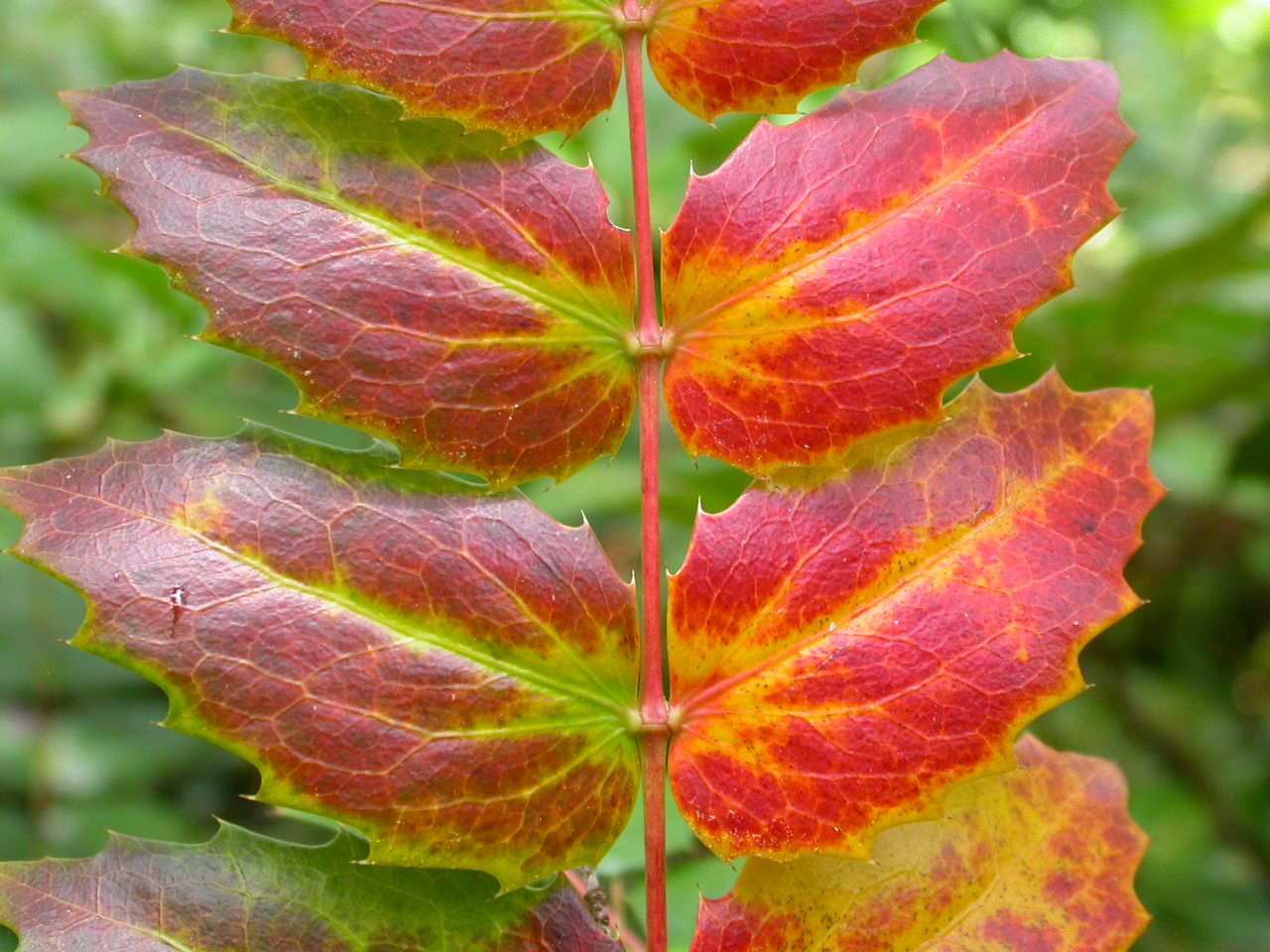
The autumn senescence of Oregon grape leaves is an example of programmed plant senescence.

== Hormonal regulation of senescence ==
Programmed senescence seems to be heavily influenced by plant hormones. The hormones abscisic acid, ethylene, jasmonic acid and salicylic acid are accepted by most scientists as promoters of senescence, but at least one source lists gibberellins, brassinosteroids and strigolactone as also being involved. Cytokinins help to maintain the plant cell and expression of cytokinin biosynthesis genes late in development prevents leaf senescence. A withdrawal of or inability of the cell to perceive cytokinin may cause it to undergo apoptosis or senescence. In addition, mutants that cannot perceive ethylene show delayed senescence. Genome-wide comparison of mRNAs expressed during dark-induced senescence versus those expressed during age-related developmental senescence demonstrate that jasmonic acid and ethylene are more important for dark-induced (stress-related) senescence while salicylic acid is more important for developmental senescence.

=== Annual versus perennial benefits ===
Some plants have evolved into annuals which die off at the end of each season and leave seeds for the next, whereas closely related plants in the same family have evolved to live as perennials. This may be a programmed "strategy" for the plants.

The benefit of an annual strategy may be genetic diversity, as one set of genes does continue year after year, but a new mix is produced each year. Secondly, being annual may allow the plants a better survival strategy, since the plant can put most of its accumulated energy and resources into seed production rather than saving some for the plant to overwinter, which would limit seed production.

Conversely, the perennial strategy may sometimes be the more effective survival strategy, because the plant has a head start every spring with growing points, roots, and stored energy that have survived through the winter. In trees for example, the structure can be built on year after year so that the tree and root structure can become larger, stronger, and capable of producing more fruit and seed than the year before, out-competing other plants for light, water, nutrients, and space. This strategy will fail when environmental conditions change rapidly. If a certain bug quickly takes advantage and kills all of the nearly identical perennials, then there will be a far lesser chance that a random mutation will slow the bug compared to more diverse annuals.

=== Plant self-pruning ===
There is a speculative hypothesis on how and why a plant induces part of itself to die off. The theory holds that leaves and roots are routinely pruned off during the growing season whether they are annual or perennial. This is done mainly to mature leaves and roots and is for one of two reasons; either both the leaves and roots that are pruned are no longer efficient enough nutrient acquisition-wise or that energy and resources are needed in another part of the plant because that part of the plant is faltering in its resource acquisition.

- Poor productivity reasons for plant self pruning – the plant rarely prunes young dividing meristematic cells, but if a fully grown mature cell is no longer acquiring nutrients that it should acquire, then it is pruned.
  - Shoot efficiency self pruning reasons – for instance, presumably a mature shoot cell must on average produce enough sugar, and acquire enough oxygen and carbon dioxide to support both it and a similar sized root cell. Actually, since plants are obviously interested in growing it is arguable, that the "directive" of the average shoot cell, is to "show a profit" and produce or acquire more than enough sugar and gases than is necessary to support both it and a similar sized root cell. If this "profit" is not shown, the shoot cell is killed off and resources are redistributed to "promising" other young shoots or leaves in the hope that they will be more productive.
  - Root efficiency self pruning reasons – similarly a mature root cell must acquire on average, more than enough minerals and water needed to support both it and a similar sized shoot cell that does not acquire water and minerals. If this does not happen, the root is killed off and resources sent to new young root candidates.
- Shortage/need-based reason for plant self pruning – this is the other side of efficiency problems.
  - Shoot shortages – if a shoot is not getting enough root derived minerals and water, the idea is that it will kill part of itself off, and send the resources to the root to make more roots.
  - Root shortages – the idea here is that if the root is not getting enough shoot derived sugar and gases it will kill part of itself off and send resources to the shoot, to allow more shoot growth.

This is an oversimplification, in that it is arguable that some shoot and root cells serve other functions than to acquire nutrients. In these cases, whether they are pruned or not would be "calculated" by the plant using some other criteria. It is also arguable that, for example, mature nutrient-acquiring shoot cells would have to acquire more than enough shoot nutrients to support both it and its share of both shoot and root cells that do not acquire sugar and gases whether they are of a structural, reproductive, immature, or just plain, root nature.

The idea that a plant does not impose efficiency demands on immature cells is that most immature cells are part of so-called dormant buds in plants. These are kept small and non-dividing until the plant needs them. They are found in buds, for instance in the base of every lateral stem.

=== Theory of hormonal induction of senescence ===
There is little theory on how plants induce themselves to senesce, although it is reasonably widely accepted that some of it is done hormonally. Botanists generally concentrate on ethylene and abscisic acid as culprits in senescence, but neglect gibberellin and brassinosteroid which inhibits root growth if not causing actual root pruning. This is perhaps because roots are below the ground and thus harder to study.

1. Shoot pruning – it is now known that ethylene induces the shedding of leaves much more than abscisic acid. ABA originally received its name because it was discovered to have a role in leaf abscission. Its role is now seen to be minor and only occurring in special cases.
  - Hormonal shoot pruning theory – a new simple theory says that even though ethylene may be responsible for the final act of leaf shedding, it is ABA and strigolactones that induces senescence in leaves due to a run away positive feedback mechanism. What supposedly happens is that ABA and strigolactones are released by mostly mature leaves under water and or mineral shortages. The ABA and strigolactones act in mature leaf cells however, by pushing out minerals, water, sugar, gases and even the growth hormones auxin and cytokinin (and possibly jasmonic and salicylic acid in addition). This causes even more ABA and strigolactones to be made until the leaf is drained of all nutrients. When conditions get particularly bad in the emptying mature leaf cell, it will experience sugar and oxygen deficiencies and so lead to gibberellin and finally ethylene emanation. When the leaf senses ethylene it knows its time to excise.
2. Root pruning – the concept that plants prune the roots in the same kind of way as they abscise leaves, is not a well discussed topic among plant scientists, although the phenomena undoubtedly exists. If gibberellin, brassinosteroid and ethylene are known to inhibit root growth it takes just a little imagination to assume they perform the same role as ethylene does in the shoot, that is to prune the roots too.
  - Hormonal root pruning theory – in the new theory just like ethylene, GA, BA and Eth are seen both to be induced by sugar (GA/BA) and oxygen (ETH) shortages (as well as maybe excess levels of carbon dioxide for Eth) in the roots, and to push sugar and oxygen, as well as minerals, water and the growth hormones out of the root cell causing a positive feedback loop resulting in the emptying and death of the root cell. The final death knell for a root might be strigolactone or most probably ABA as these are indicators of substances that should be abundant in the root and if they cannot even support themselves with these nutrients then they should be senesced.
3. Parallels to cell division – the theory, perhaps even more controversially, asserts that just as both auxin and cytokinin seem to be needed before a plant cell divides, in the same way perhaps ethylene and GA/BA (and ABA and strigolactones) are needed before a cell would senesce.

== Seed senescence ==
Seed germination performance is a major determinant of crop yield. Deterioration of seed quality with age is associated with accumulation of DNA damage. In dry, aging rye seeds, DNA damages occur with loss of viability of embryos. Dry seeds of Vicia faba accumulate DNA damage with time in storage, and undergo DNA repair upon germination. In Arabidopsis, a DNA ligase is employed in repair of DNA single- and double-strand breaks during seed germination and this ligase is an important determinant of seed longevity. In eukaryotes, the cellular repair response to DNA damage is orchestrated, in part, by the DNA damage checkpoint kinase ATM. ATM has a major role in controlling germination of aged seeds by integrating progression through germination with the repair response to DNA damages accumulated during the dry quiescent state.

== See also ==
- DNA damage theory of aging
