= Music royalties =

Royalty payments for music

Music royalties are royalty payments for the writing and performing of music. Unlike other forms of intellectual property, music has a strong linkage to individuals – composers (score), songwriters (lyrics) and writers of musical plays – in that they can own the exclusive copyright to created music and can license it for performance independent of corporates. Recording companies and the performing artists that create a "sound recording" of the music enjoy a separate set of copyrights and royalties from the sale of recordings and from their digital transmission (depending on national laws).

With the advent of pop music and innovations in technology within the communication and presentation of media, the subject of music royalties can be a complex field.

A musical composition obtains copyright protection as soon as it is written out or recorded. However, it is not protected from infringed use unless it is registered with the copyright authority, for instance, the United States Copyright Office, which is administered by the Library of Congress. No person or entity, other than the copyright owner, can use or employ the music for gain without obtaining a license from the composer/songwriter.

Inherently, as copyright, it confers on its owner, a distinctive "bundle" of five exclusive rights:

(a) to make copies of the songs through print or recordings
(b) to distribute them to the public for profit
(c) to the "public performance right"; live or through a recording
(d) to create a derivative work to include elements of the original music; and
(e) to "display" it (not very relevant in context).

Where the score and the lyric of a composition are contributions of different persons, each of them is an equal owner of such rights.

These exclusive rights have led to the evolution of distinct commercial terminology used in the music industry.

They take four forms:

(1) royalties from "print rights"
(2) mechanical royalties from the recording of composed music on CDs and tape
(3) performance royalties from the performance of the compositions/songs on stage or television through artists and bands, and
(4) synch (for synchronization) royalties from using or adapting the musical score in the movies, television advertisements, etc.

With the advent of the internet, an additional set of royalties has come into play: the digital rights from simulcasting, webcasting, streaming, downloading, and online "on-demand service".

In the following the terms "composer" and "songwriter" (either lyric or score) are synonymous.

== Print rights in music ==
While the focus here is on royalty rates pertaining to music marketed in the print form or "sheet music", its discussion is a prelude to the much more important and larger sources of royalty income today from music sold in media such as CDs, television and the internet.

Sheet music is the first form of music to which royalties were applied, which was then gradually extended to other formats. Any performance of music by singers or bands requires that it be first reduced to its written sheet form from which the "song" (score) and its lyric are read. Otherwise, the authenticity of its origin, essential for copyright claims, will be lost, as was the case with folk songs and American "westerns" propagated by the oral tradition.

=== Brief history ===
The ability to print music arises from a series of technological developments in print and art histories from the 11th to the 18th centuries.

The first, and commercially successful, invention was the development of the "movable type" printing press, the Gutenberg press in the 15th century; it was used to print the Gutenberg Bible. Later the printing system enabled printed music. Printed music, until then, tended to be one line chants. The difficulty in using movable type for music is that all the elements must align – the note head must be properly aligned with the staff, lest it have an unintended meaning.

Musical notation was well developed by then, originating around 1025. Guido d'Arezzo developed a system of pitch notation using lines and spaces. Until this time, only two lines had been used. d'Arezzo expanded this system to four lines, and initiated the idea of ledger lines by adding lines above or below these lines as needed. He used square notes called neumes. This system eliminated any uncertainty of pitch. d'Arezzo also developed a system of clefs, which became the basis for the clef system: bass clef, treble clef, and so on. (Co-existing civilizations used other forms of notation).

In Europe the major consumers of printed music in the 17th and 18th centuries were the royal courts for both solemn and festive occasions. Music was also employed for entertainment, both by the courts and the nobility. Composers made their livings from commissioned work, and worked as conductors, performers and tutors of music or through appointments to the courts. To a certain extent, music publishers also paid composers for rights to print music, but this was not royalty as is generally understood today.

The European Church was also a large user of music, both religious and secular. However, performances were largely based on hand-written music or aural training.

=== American origins of music copyright and royalties ===
Until the mid-18th century, American popular music largely consisted of songs from the British Isles, whose lyric and score were sometimes available in engraved prints. Mass production of music was not possible until movable type was introduced. Music with this type was first printed in the US in 1750. At the beginning the type consisted of the notehead, stem and staff which were combined into a single font. Later the fonts were made up of the notehead, stems and flags attached to the staff line. Until that time, prints existed only on engraved plates.

The first federal law on copyright was enacted in the US Copyright Act of 1790 which made it possible to give protection to original scores and lyrics.

America's most prominent contribution is jazz and all the music styles which preceded and co-exist with it – its variations on church music, African-American work songs, cornfield hollers, wind bands in funeral procession, blues, rag, etc. – and of innovations in church music, rhythmic variations, stamping, tapping of feet, strutting, shuffling, wailing, laments and spiritual ecstasy.

Until its recent sophistication, jazz was not amenable to written form, and thus not copyrightable, due to its improvisational element and the fact that many of the creators of this form could not read or write music. It was its precursor, minstrelsy, which came to be written and royalties paid for the use of popular music.

Blackface minstrelsy was the first distinctly American theatrical form. In the 1830s and 1840s, it was at the core of the rise of an American music industry.

Stephen Foster was the pre-eminent songwriter in the US of that time. His songs, such as "Oh! Susanna", "Camptown Races", "My Old Kentucky Home", "Beautiful Dreamer" and "Swanee River" remain popular 150 years after their composition and have worldwide appreciation. Foster, who had little formal music training, composed songs for Christy's Minstrels, one of the prominent minstrel groups of the time.

W.C. Peters was the first major publisher of Foster's works, but Foster saw very little of the profits. "Oh, Susanna" was an overnight success and a Goldrush favorite, but Foster received just $100 from his publisher for it – in part due to his lack of interest in money and the free gifts of music he gave to him. Foster's first love lay in writing music and its success. Foster did later contract with Christy (for $15 each) for "Old Folks at Home" and "Farewell my Lilly Dear". "Oh, Susanna" also led Foster to two New York publishers, Firth, Pond and Co. and F.D. Benson, who contracted with him to pay royalties at 2¢ per printed copy sold by them.

Minstrelsy slowly gave way to songs generated by the American Civil War, followed by the rise of Tin Pan Alley and Parlour music, both of which led to an explosion of sheet music, greatly aided by the emergence of the player piano. While the player piano made inroads deep into the 20th century, more music was reproduced through radio and the phonograph, leading to new forms of royalty payments, and leading to the decline of sheet music.

American innovations in church music also provided royalties to its creators. While Stephen Foster is often credited as the originator of print music in America, William Billings is the real father of American music. In 1782, of the 264 music compositions in print, 226 were his church-related compositions. Similarly, Billings was the composer of a quarter of the 200 anthems published until 1810. Neither he nor his family received any royalties, although the Copyright Act of 1790 was then in place.

Church music plays a significant part in American print royalties. When the Lutheran Church split from the Catholic Church in the 16th century, more than religion changed. Martin Luther wanted his entire congregation to take part in the music of his services, not just the choir. This new chorale style finds its way in both present church music and jazz.

== Print royalties (music) ==
The royalty rate for printing a book (a novel, lyrics or music) for sale globally, or for its download, varies from 20 to 30% of the suggested retail sales value, which is collected by the publisher/distributor. The payment is made by the publisher/distributor and corresponds to the agreement (license) between the writer and the publisher/distributor as with other music royalties. The agreement is typically non-exclusive to the publisher and the term may vary from 3–5 years. Established writers favor certain publishers/distributors and usually receive higher royalties.

All of the royalty does not go directly to the writer. Rather, it is shared with the publisher on a 50:50 basis.

If a book involved is a play, it might be dramatized. The right to dramatize is a separate right – known as grand rights. This income is shared by the many personalities and organizations who come together to offer the play: the playwright, composer of the music played, producer, director of the play and so forth. There is no convention to the royalties paid for grand rights and it is freely negotiated between the publisher and the mentioned participants.

If the writer's work is only part of a publication, then the royalty paid is pro-rata, a facet which is more often met in a book of lyrics or in a book of hymns and sometimes in an anthology.

Church music – that is, music that is based on written work – is important particularly in the Americas and in some other countries of Europe. Examples are hymns, anthems, and songbooks. Unlike novels and plays, hymns are sung with regularity. Very often, the hymns and songs are sung from lyrics in a book, or more common nowadays, from the work projected on a computer screen. In the US, the Christian Copyright Licensing International, Inc. is the collection agency for royalties but a song or hymn writers have to be registered with them and the songs identified.

== Foreign publishing ==
Viewed from a US perspective, foreign publishing involves two basic types of publishing – sub-publishing and co-publishing occurrences in one or more territories outside that of basic origin. Sub-publishing, itself, is one of two forms: sub-publishers who merely license out the original work or those which make and sell the products which are the subject of the license, such as print books and records (with local artists performing the work).

Sub-publishers who produce and market a product retain 10–15% of the marked retail price and remit the balance to the main publisher with whom they have the copyright license. Those sub-publishers who merely license out the work earn between 15 and 25%.

== Mechanical royalties ==
Although the terms "mechanical" and mechanical license have their origins in the piano rolls on which music was recorded in the early part of the 20th century, the scope of their modern usage is much wider and covers any copyrighted audio composition that is rendered mechanically (i.e., without human performers). As such, it includes:

- Compact discs, vinyl records and tape recordings
- music videos
- ringtones
- MIDI files
- downloaded tracks
- DVDs, VHS, UMDs
- computer games
- musical toys etc.

Record companies are responsible for paying royalties to those artists who have performed for a recording based on the sale of CDs by retailers.

=== United States ===
The United States treatment of mechanical royalties differs markedly from international practice. In the United States, while the right to use copyrighted music for making records for public distribution (for private use) is an exclusive right of the composer, the Copyright Act provides that once the music is so recorded, anyone else can record the composition/song without a negotiated license but on the payment of the statutory compulsory royalty. Thus, its use by different artists could lead to several separately owned copyrighted "sound recordings".

The following is a partial segment of the compulsory rates as they have applied from 1998 to 2007 in the United States. The royalty rates in the table have two elements: (i) a minimum rate applies for a duration equivalent to 5 minutes, or less, of a musical composition/song and (ii) a per-minute rate if the composition exceeds it, whichever is greater.

Compulsory Mechanical Royalty Rates – United States
Period	Royalty Rate
1909 - 1977	2 cents
1 January 1978 - 31 December 1980	2.75 cents or 0.5 cents/min
1 January 1981 - 31 December 1982	4 cents or 0.75 cents/min
1 January 1983 - 30 June 1984	4.25 cents or 0.8 cents/min
1 July 1984 - 31 December 1985	4.5 cents or 0.85 cents/min
1 January 1986 - 31 December 1987	5 cents or 0.95 cents/min
1 January 1988 - 31 December 1989	5.25 cents or 1 cent/min
1 January 1990 - 31 December 1991	5.7 cents or 1.1 cents/min
1 January 1992 - 31 December 1993	6.25 cents or 1.2 cents/min
1 January 1994 - 31 December 1995	6.60 cents or 1.25 cents/min
1 January 1996 - 31 December 1997	6.95 cents or 1.3 cents/min
1 January 1998 – 31 December 1999	7.10 cents or 1.35 cents/min
1 January 2000 – 31 December 2001	7.55 cents or 1.43 cents/min
1 January 2002 – 31 December 2003	8.00 cents or 1.55 cents/min
1 January 2004 – 31 December 2005	8.50 cents or 1.65 cents/min
1 January 2006 – 31 December 2007	9.10 cents or 1.75 cents/min

In the predominant case, the composer assigns the song copyright to a publishing company under a "publishing agreement" which makes the publisher exclusive owner of the composition. The publisher's role is to promote the music by extending the written music to recordings of vocal, instrumental and orchestral arrangements and to administer the collection of royalties (which, as will shortly be seen, is in reality done by specialized companies). The publisher also licenses "subpublishers" domestically and in other countries to similarly promote the music and administer the collection of royalties.

In a fair publishing agreement, every 100 units of currency that flows to the publisher gets divided as follows: 50 units go to the songwriter and 50 units to the publisher minus operating and administrative fees and applicable taxes. However, the music writer obtains a further 25 units from the publisher's share if the music writer retains a portion of the music publishing rights (as a co-publisher). In effect, the co-publishing agreement is a 50/50 share of royalties in favor of the songwriter if administrative costs of publishing are disregarded. This is near international practice.

When a company (recording label) records the composed music, say, on a CD master, it obtains a distinctly separate copyright to the sound recording, with all the exclusivities that flow to such copyright. The main obligation of the recording label to the songwriter and her publisher is to pay the contracted royalties on the license received.

While the compulsory rates remain unaffected, recording companies in the U.S. typically will negotiate to pay not more than 75% of the compulsory rate where the songwriter is also the recording artist and will further (in the U.S.) extend that to a maximum of 10 songs, even though the marketed recording may carry more than that number. This 'reduced rate' results from the incorporation of a "controlled composition" clause in the licensing contract since the composer as recording artist is seen to control the content of the recording.

Mechanical royalties for music produced outside of the United States are negotiated – there being no compulsory licensing – and royalty payments to the composer and her publisher for recordings are based on the wholesale, retail, or "suggested retail value" of the marketed CDs.

Recording artists earn royalties only from the sale of CDs and tapes and, as will be seen later, from sales arising from digital rights. Where the songwriter is also the recording artist, royalties from CD sales add to those from the recording contract.

In the U.S., recording artists earn royalties amounting to 10%–25% (of the suggested retail price of the recording depending on their popularity but such is before deductions for "packaging", "breakage", "promotion sales" and holdback for "returns", which act to significantly reduce net royalty incomes.

In the U.S., the Harry Fox Agency, HFA, is the predominant licensor, collector and distributor for mechanical royalties, although there are several small competing organizations. For its operations, it charges about 6% as commission. HFA, like its counterparts in other countries, is a state-approved quasi-monopoly and is expected to act in the interests of the composers/songwriters – and thus obtains the right to audit record company sales. Additional third party administrators such as RightsFlow provide services to license, account and pay mechanical royalties and are growing. RightsFlow is paid by the licensees (artists, labels, distributors, online music services) and in turn does not extract a commission from the mechanical royalties paid out.

=== UK and Europe ===
In the UK the Mechanical-Copyright Protection Society, MCPS (now in alliance with PRS), acts to collect (and distribute) royalties to composers, songwriters and publishers for CDs and for digital formats. It is a not-for-profit organization which funds its work through a commissions on aggregate revenues. The royalty rate for licensing tracks is 6.5% of retail price (or 8.5% of the published wholesale price).

In Europe, the major licensing and mechanical royalty collection societies are:

SACEM in France
GEMA in Germany
SFA in Italy

The mechanical royalty rate paid to the publisher in Europe is about 6.5% on the Published Price to Dealer (PPD).

=== Africa ===
SACEM acts collectively for "francophone" countries in Africa. For South Africa mechanical royaltues are distributed by CAPASSO. The UK society also has strong links with English-speaking African countries.

=== Australasia ===
In Australia and New Zealand, the Australasian Mechanical Copyright Owners Society (AMCOS) collects royalties for its members.

=== Other ===
Mechanical societies for other countries can be found at the main national collection societies.

== Performance ==
"Performance" in the music industry can include any of the following:

- a performance of a song or composition – live, recorded or broadcast
- a live performance by any musician
- a performance by any musician through a recording on physical media
- performance through the playing of recorded music
- music performed through the web (digital transmissions)

In the United Kingdom, the Church of England is specifically exempted from performance royalties for music performed in services because it is a state-established church. Traditionally, American music publishers have not sought performance royalties for music sung and played in church services–the license to perform being implied by distributors of church sheet music. ASCAP, BMI, and SESAC exempt church worship services from performance royalties, but make no exemption for church-hosted concerts.

It is useful to treat these royalties under two classifications:

(a) those associated with conventional forms of music distribution which have prevailed for most part of the 20th century, and
(b) those from emerging 'digital rights' associated with newer forms of communication, entertainment and media technologies (from 'ring tones' to 'downloads' to 'live internet streaming'.

=== Conventional forms of royalty payment ===
In the conventional context, royalties are paid to composers and publishers and record labels for public performances of their music on vehicles such as the jukebox, stage, radio or TV. Users of music need to obtain a "performing rights license" from music societies – as will be explained shortly – to use the music. Performing rights extend both to live and recorded music played in such diverse areas as cafés, skating rinks, etc.

Licensing is generally done by music societies called "Performing Rights Organizations" (PROs), some of which are government-approved or government-owned, to which the composer, the publisher, performer (in some cases) or the record label have subscribed.

The diagram on the right titled "The Performance Rights Complex" shows the general sequences by which a song or a composition gets to be titled a "performance" and which brings royalties to songwriters/publishers, performing artists and record labels. How, and to whom, royalties are paid is different in the United States from what it is, for example, in the UK. Most countries have "practices" more in common with the UK than the US.

In the United Kingdom there are three principal organizations:

(i) Phonographic Performance Limited (PPL)
(ii) PRS for Music (formerly the Performing Right Society)
(iii) Mechanical-Copyright Protection Society (MCPS)

Who license music (to music-users) and act as royalty collection and distribution agencies for their members. These funds are distributed quarterly though there can be delays depending on what PRO is being used to collect on music royalties. If copyrights holder(s) want payment sooner they have an option to take out an advance against their royalties with their PRO though these are based around 100% recoupment.

PPL issues performance licenses to all UK radio, TV and broadcast stations, as well as establishments who employ sound recordings (tapes, CDs), in entertaining the public. The licensing company collects and distributes royalties to the "record label" for the sound recording and to "featured UK performers" in the recording. Performers do not earn from sound recordings on video and film.

PRS, which is now in alliance with MCPS, collects royalties from music-users and distributes them directly to "songwriters" and "publishers" whose works are performed live, on radio or on TV on a 50:50 basis. MCPS licenses music for broadcast in the range 3 to 5.25% of net advertising revenues.

MCPS also collects and disburses mechanical royalties to writers and publishers in a manner similar to PRS. Although allied, they serve, for now, as separate organizations for membership.

The next diagram shows the sequences in the licensing of performances and the royalty collection and distribution process in the UK. Every song or recording has a unique identity by which they are licensed and tracked. Details of songs or recordings are notified to the PROs directly, or through Catco, an electronic tracking system. It needs to be clarified that while blanket licenses are commonly issued to music-users, the latter are responsible for "usage returns" – the actual frequency of performances under the license – which then becomes the basis for the PRO to apportion royalties to writers, publishers, and record labels. ("DIY indies" are "do-it-yourself" independent songwriters – and, often, the performers as well – who record and publish under their own labels). In the UK, music is licensed (and royalties paid on it) at the track level.

There is also a separate organization in the UK called VPL, which is the collecting society set up by the record industry in 1984 to grant licenses to users of music videos, e.g. broadcasters, program-makers, video jukebox system suppliers. The licensing income collected from users is paid out to the society's members after administrative costs are deducted.

There are different models for royalty collection in European countries. In some of them, mechanical and performing rights are administered jointly. SACEM (France), SABAM (Belgium), GEMA (Germany) and JASRAC (Japan) work that way.

In the United States, in contrast, SoundExchange, ASCAP, BMI (Broadcast Music, Inc) and SESAC (Society of European Stage Authors & Composers) are the four principal Performance Rights Organizations (PROs), although smaller societies exist. The royalty that is paid to the composer and publisher is determined by the method of assessment used by the PRO to gauge the use of the music, there being no external metrics as in mechanical royalties or the reporting system used in the UK. Very basically, a PRO aggregates the royalties that are due to all of the composers/songwriters "who are its members" and each composer and publisher is paid royalties based on the assessed frequency of the music's performance, post deductions of charges (which are many). The PROs are audited agencies. They "directly" pay the songwriter and the publisher their respective shares. (If part of the publisher's share is retained by the songwriter, the publisher pays the songwriter that part of the publisher's share).

Typically, the PRO negotiates blanket licenses with radio stations, television networks and other "music users", each of whom receives the right to perform any of the music in the repertoire of the PRO for a set sum of money.

PROs use different types of surveys to determine the frequency of usage of a composition/song. ASCAP uses random sampling, SESAC uses cue sheets for TV performances and 'digital pattern recognition' for radio performances while BMI employs more scientific methods.

In the United States, only the composer and the publisher are paid performance royalties and not performing artists (digital rights being a different matter). Likewise, the record label, whose music is used in a performance, is not entitled to royalties in the US on the premise that performances lead sales of records. The issue of performance royalties for radio use has been a complicated matter for decades, as broadcasters have typically worked against Congress to pass laws that would require such payments. In 2021, Congress introduced the American Music Fairness Act which would require radio broadcasters to pay both performers and labels for use of their songs over the radio, with a rate schedule adjusted based on the size of the radio station.

Where a performance has co-writers along with the composer/songwriter – as in a musical play – they will share the royalty.

=== In digital distribution ===
==== US regulatory provisions ====
Regulatory provisions in the US, EU and elsewhere is in a state of flux, continuously being challenged by developments in technology; thus almost any regulation stated here exists in a tentative format.

In 1970, US Court Appeals for the Second Circuit established 15 factors, that ought to be considered in determining reasonable royalty in patent infringement cases (see Georgia-Pacific Corp. v. United States Plywood Corp.)

The US Copyright Act of 1976 identified "musical works" and "sound recordings" eligible for copyright protection. The term "musical work" refers to the notes and lyrics of a song or a piece of music, while a "sound recording" results from its fixation on physical media. Copyright owners of musical works are granted exclusive rights to license over-the-air radio and TV broadcasts, entitling them royalties, which are, as said earlier, collected and distributed by the PROs. Under the Act, record companies and recording artists are, presently, not entitled to royalties from radio and TV broadcasts of their music, except in the case of digital services and webcasts where copyright owners and performers obtain royalties (see later). This is in contrast to international standards where performers also obtain royalties from over-the-air and digital broadcasting.

In 1995, the Congress introduced the Digital Performance Right in Sound Recordings Act (DPRA), which became effective 1 February 1996. This Act granted owners of sound recordings the exclusive license to perform the copyrighted work publicly by means of digital audio transmissions but it exempted non-subscription services (and some other services). Where the rights owner could not voluntarily reach agreement with the broadcaster, it could avail of compulsory licensing provisions. Under the Act, the compulsory royalty (the royalty schedule follows) was to be shared in the manner: 50% to the record companies, 45% to featured artists, 2½% to non-featured musicians through American Federation of Musicians (AFM) in the United States and Canada and 2½% for non-featured vocalists through American Federation of Television and Radio Artists (AFTRA). United States Congress also created a new compulsory license for certain subscription digital audio services, which transmit sound recordings via cable television and Direct-broadcast satellite (DBS) on a non-interactive basis in the absence of a voluntary negotiation and agreement.

In 1998, the Congress amended DPRA to create the Digital Millennium Copyright Act (DMCA) by redefining the above-noted subscription services of DPRA as "preexisting subscription services" and expanded the statutory license to include new categories of digital audio services that may operate under the license. In effect, DMCA created three categories of licensees:

1. pre-existing satellite digital audio radio services
2. new subscription services, and
3. eligible non-subscription transmission services.

In addition to the above, a fourth license was created permit webcasters to make "ephemeral recordings" of a sound recording (temporary copies) to facilitate streaming but with a royalty to be paid.

Non-subscription webcasting royalties have also to be shared between record companies and performers in the proportions set out under DPRA.

The Table below titled SUMMARY OF STATUTORY ROYALTY RATES FOR DIGITAL WEBCASTING – UNITED STATES encapsulates the royalties set for non-interactive webcasting.

To qualify for compulsory licensing under non-subscription services, the webcasting needs to fit the following six criteria:

- it is non-interactive
- it does not exceed the sound recording performance complement
- it is accompanied by information on the song title and recording artist
- it does not publish a program schedule or specify the songs to be transmitted
- it does not automatically switch from one program channel to another, and
- it does not allow a user to request songs to be played particularly for that user.

An inter-active service is one which allows a listener to receive a specially created internet stream in which she dictates the songs to be played by selecting songs from the website menu. Such a service would take the website out from under the compulsory license and require negotiations with the copyright owners.

However, a service is non-interactive if it permits people to request songs which are then played to the public at large. Nonetheless, several rules apply such as, within any three-hour period, three cuts from a CD, but no more than two cuts consecutively can be played, or a site can play four songs from any singer from a boxed CD-set, but no more than three cuts consecutively.

Both interactive and non-interactive streaming services are required and regulated by the Copyright Royalty Judges to pay out a minimum fee per stream. Interactive services must pay out $0.0022 per stream while non-interactive streaming services must pay $0.0017 per stream. These rates are set to be what these services are required to distribute per stream and has been the rate since 1 January 2016 and will be reevaluated after 31 December 2020.

The SoundExchange, a non-profit organization, is defined under the legislation to act on behalf of record companies (including the majors) to license performance and reproduction rights and negotiate royalties with the broadcasters. It is governed by a board of artist and label representatives. Services include track level accounting of performances to all members and collection and distribution of foreign royalties to all members.

In the absence of a voluntary agreement between the SoundExchange and the broadcasters, Copyright Arbitration Royalty Panel (CARP) was authorized to set the statutory rates as could prevail between a "willing buyer" and "willing sellers". SoundExchange handles only the collection of royalties from "compulsory licenses" for non-interactive streaming services that use satellite, cable or internet methods of distribution.

To recap, under the law three types of licenses are required for streaming of musical recordings:

(a) a performance license applicable for underlying words( lyrics) and music (score)
(b) a performance license applicable to the streaming the sound recording
(c) a storage license for the passage of a sound recording through a file server

The royalties for the first of the above two licenses are obtained from SoundExchange and the third from the PROs. Failure to make required payments constitutes copyright infringement and is subject to statutory damages.

Both broadcasters involved in webcasting and pure-Internet non-broadcasters are required to pay these royalties under the rules framed under the Act. All webcasters are also required to be registered with the United States Copyright Office.

SUMMARY OF STATUTORY ROYALTY RATES FOR DIGITAL WEBCASTING – UNITED STATES

1. Webcaster
DMCA Compliant Service	Performance Fee (per performance)	Ephemeral Licence Fee
(a) Simultaneous internet retransmission of over-the-air AM or FM radio broadcasts	0.07¢	9% of performance fees due
(b) All other internet transmission	0.14¢	9% of performance fees due

2. Commercial Broadcaster
DMCA Compliant Service	Performance Fee (per performance)	Ephemeral Licence Fee
(a) Simultaneous internet retransmission of over-the-air AM or FM radio broadcasts	0.07¢	9% of performance fees due
(b) All other internet transmission	0.14¢	9% of performance fees due

3. Non-CPB, non-commercial broadcasts:
DMCA Compliant Service	Performance Fee (per performance)	Ephemeral Licence Fee
(a) Simultaneous internet retransmission of over-the-air AM or FM radio broadcasts	0.02¢	9% of performance fees due
(b) All other internet transmission	0.05¢	9% of performance fees due

4. Business Establishment Service:
DMCA Compliant Service	Performance Fee (per performance)	Ephemeral Licence Fee
(a) Simultaneous internet retransmission of over-the-air AM or FM radio broadcasts	Statutorily Exempt	10% of gross proceeds
Minimum Fee	All Cases	$500 per year for each licensee

In 2017, 82% of revenues for the entire music industry was attributed to digital music services. Streaming accounted for 67% of revenues in the US music industry.

==== UK legislation ====
The United Kingdom adopted the 2001 Information Society Directive in 2003 and the meaning of broadcast performance was broadened to cover "communicating to the public". This then included music distribution through the internet and the transmission of ringtones to mobiles. Thus a music download was a "copy" of proprietary music and hence required to be licensed.

After a prolonged battle on royalties between online music companies such as AOL, Napster and the recording companies (but not all of them), represented by the British Phonographic Industry (BPI), and organizations representing the interests of songwriters (MCPS and PRS) a compromise was reached, leading to a subsequent 3-year interim legislation (2007) adopted by the UK Copyright Tribunal under the Copyright, Designs and Patents Act 1988. The legislation, referring to a new JOL (Joint Online License), applies only to music purchased within UK.

The applicable royalties are given in the table below which, also includes music downloads and music services through mobile devices. This path-breaking legislation is expected to become the model for EU (which is yet to develop comprehensive legislation), and perhaps even extend to the US.

Note that the legislation includes the distinction between downloads of musical tracks from iTunes and other stores, which were considered "sales" and the webcasts considered "performances".

In brief, the compromise reached is that songwriters will receive 8% of gross revenues (definition follows), less VAT, as royalty for each track downloaded bridging the demand of the artists demanding a 12% royalty rate (what was, otherwise, the norm for a CD) and music companies holding out for 6.5%, slightly higher than the 5.7% paid for a 79p track sold by iTunes. A minimum of four pence will be paid, in the new legislation, if tracks are discounted.

The terms used in the legislated table are explained following it.

Digital Royalties – Interim Settlement, United Kingdom – 2007
Service	Royalty rate	Minimum
Permanent Download	8%	£0.04 per download – reducing by degrees for larger bundles of tracks, or certain older tracks, to £0.02 (in respect of a bundle of 30 tracks+)
Limited Download or On Demand Service	8%	Mobile subscription: £0.60/subscriber/month PC subscription: £0.40/subscriber/month Limited Subscription: £0.20/subscriber/month All others: £0.0022 per musical work communicated to the public
Special Webcasting (premium or interactive service where 50%+ of content is by single band/artist)	8%	Subscription: £0.0022 per musical work (if not subscription); if the service is subscription, minimum to be negotiated
Premium or interactive webcasting	6.5%	Subscription: £0.22/subscriber/month;otherwise, £0.00085 per musical work communicated to the public
Pure webcasting	6.5%	Subscription £0.22/subscriber/month; otherwise 0.0006/musical work communicated to the public

Service	Royalty rate and minimum
Mobile or Permanent downloads and other mobile services	Rates and minima as per services above, except that: For mobile Permanent Downloads, revenue is reduced by 15% For all other Mobile services revenue is reduced by 7.5% The above reductions to apply until prices converge with non-mobile services.

Not all music providers in the UK were part of the compromise that led to the legislation. For those not participating – principally, AOL, Yahoo! and RealNetworks – the Tribunal set the royalty rate for pure webcasting at 5.75%.

UK legislation recognizes the term online as referring to downloading digital files from the internet and mobile network operators. Offline is the term used for the delivery of music through physical media such as a CD or a DVD.

A stream is a file of continuous music listened to through a consumer's receiving device with no playable copy of the music remaining.

Permanent Downloads are transfers (sale) of music from a website to a computer or mobile telephone for permanent retention and use whenever the purchaser wishes, analogous to the purchase of a CD.

A Limited Download is similar to a permanent download but differs from it in that the consumer's use of the copy is in some way restricted by associated technology; for instance, becomes unusable when the subscription ends (say, through an encoding, such as DRM, of the downloaded music).

On-demand streaming is music streamed to the listener on the computer or mobile to enable her to listen to the music once, twice or a number of times during the period of subscription to the service.

Pure Webcasting is where the user receives a stream of pre-programmed music chosen "by the music service provider". It is non-interactive to the extent that even pausing or skipping of tracks is not possible.

Premium and Interactive Webcasting are personalized subscription services intermediate between pure webcasting and downloading.

Special webcasting is a service where the user can choose a stream of music, the majority of which comprises works from one source – an artist, group or particular concert.

Simulcasting, although not in the Table above, is the simultaneous re-transmission by a licensed transmission of the program of a radio or TV station over the internet of an otherwise traditional broadcast. The person receiving the simulcast normally makes no permanent copy of it. It is defined in the legislation as an offline service.

'Gross Revenue', which is comprehensively defined in the legislation, summarized here, means, all revenue received (or receivable) by the licensee from Users, all revenue received through advertisements associated with the music service, sponsorship fees, commissions from third parties and revenue arising from barter or contra deals. No deductions are permitted except for refunds of unused music due to technical faults.

The advertising revenue which is shared between the artist and music provider is defined as:

- when the advertising is in-stream;
- when the music offered forms the only content of a page featuring advertising (excluding the advertisement itself); and
- when the music offered forms more than 75% of a page featuring advertising (excluding the advertisement itself).

== Synchronization ==
According to Joel Mabus, the term synchronization "comes from the early days of the talkies when music was first synchronized with film". The terminology originated in US industry but has now spread worldwide.

In the UK and elsewhere, with the exception of the US, there is apparently no legal prohibition to the combination of audio and visual images and no explicit statutory right for the collection of sync royalties. In the US, however, the Copyright Act defines the audiovisual format as that of combining images with music for use in machines and there is no explicit rate set such as the "compulsory royalty rate" for copying music. However, there are instances of courts implying the synchronization right, but even so, it is an amorphous colloquial commercial term of acceptance.

Synchronization royalties ("sync licenses") are paid for the use of copyrighted music in (largely) audiovisual productions, such as in DVDs, movies, and advertisements. Music used in news tracks are also sync licenses. Synchronization can extend to live media performances, such as plays and live theatre. They become extremely important for new media – the usage of music in the form of mp3, wav, flac files and for usage in webcasts, embedded media in microchips (e.g. karaoke), etc. but the legal conventions are yet to be drawn.

Synchronization royalties are due to the composer/songwriter or his/her publisher. They are strictly contractual in nature and vary greatly in amount depending on the subjective importance of the music, the mode of production and the media used. The royalty payable is that of mutual acceptance but is conditioned by industry practice.

It is useful to note in this connection the concept of the "needle drop" (now laser drop) in that the sync royalty becomes payable every time the needle drops 'on the record player' in a public performance. All openings and closings, every cut to advertisements, every cut back from ads, all re-runs shown by every TV company, in every country in the world generates a "synchro", although a single payment may be renegotiable in advance.

There is a category of royalty free music in the field of synchronization. This refers to the use of music in a "library" for which a one-time royalty has been negotiated. It is an alternative to needle-drop negotiation.

In terms of numbers, royalties can range from, say. $500–2000 for a "festival-use license" to $250,000 or more for a movie film score. For low-budget films, which are deemed less than $2 million, the royalties range from 3%–6% or could be per song per usage.

== Audio Home Recording Act of 1992 ==
In the US, the Audio Home Recording Act became effective law in October 1992. The law enabled the release of recordable digital formats such as Sony and Philips' Digital Audio Tape without fear of contributory infringement lawsuits.

== See also ==
- Recoupment
- Music industry
