= Chlorophyllase =

Enzyme in chlorophyll metabolism

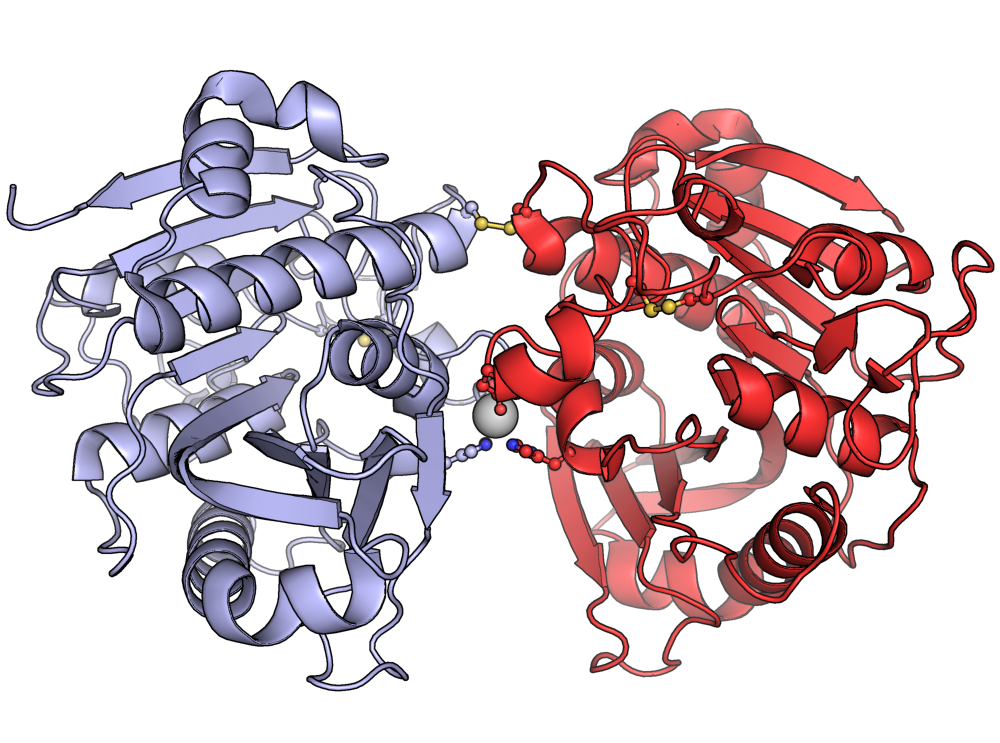
- Common wheat chlorophyllase with bound calcium (grey) and disulphide bonds highlighted. PDB: 8FJD

Identifiers
- EC no.: 3.1.1.14
- CAS no.: 9025-96-1

Databases
- BRENDA: enzyme data
- ExPASy: NiceZyme view
- KEGG: enzyme entry
- MetaCyc: metabolic pathway
- Rhea: reactions
- PDB structures: RCSB PDB PDBe PDBsum
- Gene Ontology: AmiGO / QuickGO
Search
- PMC: articles
- PubMed: articles
- NCBI: proteins

Chlorophyllase

Identifiers
- Symbol: Chlorophyllase
- Pfam: PF07224
- Pfam clan: CL0028
- InterPro: IPR017395
Available protein structures:
- PDB: IPR017395 PF07224 (ECOD; PDBsum)
- AlphaFold: IPR017395; PF07224

Chlorophyllase is an essential enzyme in chlorophyll metabolism. It is a membrane proteins commonly known as chlase (EC 3.1.1.14, CLH) with systematic name chlorophyll chlorophyllidohydrolase. It mainly catalyzes the reaction

chlorophyll a
H_{2}O
H_{2}O
chlorophyllide a
+ phytol

This reaction is responsible for the breakdown of chlorophylls during senescence. Chlorophyllase can be found in the chloroplast, thylakoid membrane and etioplast of higher plants and in ferns, mosses, brown and red algae and diatoms. Chlase is the catalyst for the hydrolysis of chlorophyll to produce chlorophyllide (also called Chlide) and phytol. It is also known to function in the esterification of Chlide and transesterification. The enzyme functions optimally at pH 8.5 and 50 °C.

== Role of chlorophyllase in chlorophyll breakdown ==
Chlorophyll is important in all photosynthetic organisms, and its synthesis and breakdown are closely regulated throughout the entire life cycle of the plant. Chlorophyll breakdown is most evident in seasonal changes as the plants lose their green color in the autumn; it is also evident in fruit ripening, leaf senescence and flowering. In this first step, chlorophyllase initiates the catabolism of chlorophyll to form chlorophyllide. Chlorophyll degradation occurs in the turnover of chlorophyll, as well as in the event of cell death caused by injuries, pathogenic attack, and other external factors.

Chlorophyllase's role is two-fold as it functions in both de-greening processes, such as autumnal coloration, and is also thought to be involved in turnover and homeostasis of chlorophylls. Chlorophyllase catalysis of the initial step of chlorophyll breakdown is important for plant development and survival. The breakdown serves as a prerequisite in the detoxification of the potentially phototoxic chlorophyll and chlorophyll intermediates as it accompanies leaf senescence to non-fluorescent catabolites. Rapid degradation of chlorophyll and its intermediates is therefore necessary to prevent cell damage due to the potential phototoxicity of chlorophyll.

== Reaction and mechanism catalyzed by chlorophyllase ==
Chlorophyllase catalyzes the hydrolysis of an ester bond to yield chlorophyllide and phytol. It reacts via transesterification or hydrolysis of a carboxylic ester in which its natural substrates are 13-OH-chlorophyll a, bacteriochlorophyll and chlorophyll a.

Hydrolysis of chlorophyll starts with the attack of a carbonyl group of chlorophyll by the oxygen of the hydroxyl group of the crucial serine residue of the chlorophyllase. This attack forms a tetrahedral transition state. The double bond of the attacked carbonyl reforms and the serine is then esterified to chlorophyllide. The phytol group consequently leaves the compound and replaces the serine residue on the chlorophyllase enzyme. The addition of water to the reaction cleaves the phytol off the enzyme. Next, through the reverse reaction, the oxygen on the hydroxy group from the water in the previous step attacks the carbonyl of the intermediate in order to form another tetrahedral transition state. The double bond of the carbonyl forms again and the serine residue returns to chlorophyllase and the ester of the chlorophyll is now a carboxylic acid. This product is chlorophyllide.

Chlorophyllide is then broken down to Pheophorbide a. After Pheophorbide a is formed, the porphyrin ring is cleaved by Pheophorbide a oxygenase (PAO) to form RCC (red chlorophyll catabolite) causing the plant to lose its green color. RCC is then broken down into pFCC.

== Regulation ==
=== Posttranslational Regulation ===
Citrus sinesis and Chenopodium album were the first plants from which the genes encoding chlorophyllase were isolated. These experiments revealed an uncharacteristic encoded sequence (21 amino acids in Citrus sinensis and 30 amino acids in Chenopodium album) located on the N-terminal that was absent from the mature protein. The chlorophyllase enzyme is a smart choice as the rate limiting enzyme of the catabolic pathway since degreening and the expression of chlorophyllase is induced in ethylene-treated Citrus. Recent data, however, suggests that chlorophyllase is expressed at low levels during natural fruit development, when chlorophyll catabolism usually takes place. Also, some data suggests that chlorophyllase activity is not consistent with degreening during natural senescence. Finally, there is evidence that chlorophyllase has been found in the inner envelope membrane of chloroplast where it does not come in contact with chlorophyll. Recent studies inspired by inconsistent data revealed that chlorophyllase in Citrus lacking the 21 amino sequence on the N-terminal results in extensive chlorophyll breakdown and the degreening effect that should occur in vivo. This cleavage occurs in the chloroplast membrane fraction. Both the full chlorophyllase and the cleaved, mature chlorophyllase, however, experienced similar levels of activity in an in vitro assay. This data suggests that the mature protein comes in contact with its substrate more readily because of the N-terminal sequence and some natural regulation occurs that directly affects enzyme activity. Another possibility is that the suborganelle compartments breaking down allowing a greater amount of enzyme activity.

=== Other forms of regulation ===
Chlorophyllide, the product of the reaction catalyzed by chlorophyllase, spontaneously combines with plant lipids such as phosphatidylcholine liposomes along with sulfoquinovosyl diacylglycerol. These two lipids cooperatively inhibit the activity of chlorophyllase, but this inhibition can be reversed by the presence of Mg++, a divalent cation. The activity of chlorophyllase also depends on the pH and ionic content of the medium. The values of kcat and kcat/Km of chlorophyllase in the presence of chlorophyll showed pKa values of 6.3 and 6.7, respectively. Temperature also affects chlorophyllase activity. Wheat chlorophyllase is active from 25 to 75 °C. The enzyme is inactivated at temperatures above 85 °C. Wheat chlorophyllase is stable 20 °C higher than other chlorophyllases. These other chlorophyllases can stay active at temperatures up to 55 °C.

Ethylene induces the synthesis of chlorophyllase and promotes the degreening of citrus fruits. Chlorophyllase was detected in protein extracts of ethylene treated fruit. Ethylene treated fruits had chlorophyllase activity increased by 5 fold in 24 hours. Ethylene, more specifically, induces increased rates of transcription of the chlorophyllase gene.

There is also evidence of a highly conserved serine lipase domain in the chlorophyllase enzyme that contains a serine residue that is essential for enzyme activity. Histidne and aspartic acid residues are also a part of the catalytic triad of chlorophyllase as a serine hydrolase. Specific inhibitors for the serine hydrolase mechanism, therefore, effectively inhibit the chlorophyllase enzyme. Also, mutations at these specific amino acid residues causes complete loss of function since the mutations change the catalytic site of the chlorophyllase enzyme.
