= PPD =

PPD may refer to:

== Computing ==
- Prearranged Payment and Deposit; a payment format used in US inter-bank debit and credit transactions, part of the ACH Network specifications.
- Pixels per degree, a measure of the resolution of a display screen as seen from an angle
- Points per day, a mechanism for measuring work done in the Folding@home distributed computing project
- PostScript Printer Description, a file created by a printer vendor that describes the entire set of capabilities of a particular PostScript printer model

== Police and security ==
- Personal protection detail, a security detail tasked with protecting one or more persons
- Philadelphia Police Department, a police agency in Pennsylvania, United States
- Phoenix Police Department, a police agency in Arizona, United States
- Presidential Protective Division, part of the United States Secret Service tasked with protecting the President and others
- Probation and Parole Division in New Mexico, United States

== Political parties ==
- Social Democratic Party (Portugal) (Partido Social Democrata), originally named Popular Democratic Party or Democratic People's Party (Partido Popular Democrático), a political party in Portugal
- Partito Popolare Democratico Svizzero, a political party in Switzerland
- Party for Democracy (Chile) (Partido por la Democracia), a political party in Chile
- Popular Democratic Party (Puerto Rico) (Partido Popular Democrático), a political party in Puerto Rico

== Science and medicine ==
- Paranoid personality disorder, a mental disorder characterized by paranoia and a pervasive, long-standing suspiciousness and generalized mistrust of others.
- p-Phenylenediamine, an aromatic amine
- Persistent Pigment Darkening, a measure of UVA protection of sunscreens
- Pharmaceutical Product Development, a global contract research organization (CRO)
- Pheophorbidase, an enzyme
- PPD test, Purified Protein Derivative test or Mantoux test, a screening test for tuberculosis
- Postpartum depression, a mental disorder affecting parents within the first year of their child's birth
- Pour point depressant, a chemical added to crude oil to lower its "pour point"
- ppd, Protopanaxadiol, a molecule
- Psychogenic polydipsia, excessive water intake with a psychiatric or pharmaceutical cause
- Postharvest physiological deterioration, natural change of crop tissues which is undesirable for human or livestock use

== Other ==
- PPD, Inc., an American contract clinical trial company.
- Pani Poni Dash!, a Japanese manga series
- Partners in Population and Development, an international intergovernmental organization for "southern" countries worldwide
- Pengangkutan Penumpang Djakarta, a bus operator in Jakarta, Indonesia
- Pontypridd railway station, Wales, its National Rail station code
- ppd, an American professional video game player
- PPD-40, a Russian submachine gun
- Prevention Project Dunkelfeld, an effort to help self-identifying pedophiles to stay offence free
- Published Price to Dealer, a music industry term designating unit price
- Presidential Policy Directive, a kind of national security directive from the Obama presidency
