= Volumo =

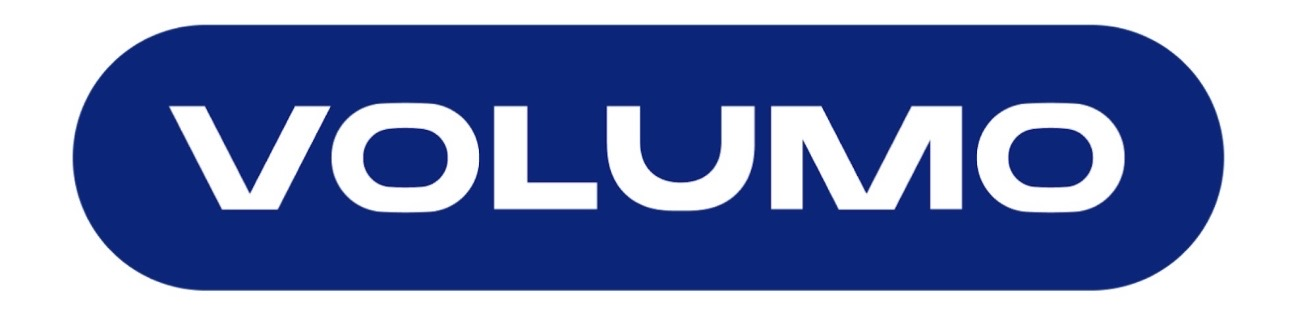
- Type: Privately held
- Founded: 2021
- Website: www.volumo.com

Volumo is an online music store and download platform focused on electronic music, serving DJs, producers, and fans of underground and niche electronic genres. The platform provides curated downloads (MP3, WAV, FLAC, AIFF), aiming to give DJs ownership of music and support artists directly. It is an independent Ukrainian-Estonian project founded in 2021. The website launched in 2022. Volumo is an AFEM (Association For Electronic Music) approved DJ download site.

== Music catalog ==
Volumo's music catalog is centered on underground and niche electronic music, with an emphasis on quality-curated releases rather than mass-aggregated content. Every release added to the store is manually selected by genre-specialist curators. The platform prioritizes underground artists and independent labels and includes exclusive releases, offering visibility to producers who often remain overshadowed on other large platforms.

== See also ==
- Electronic dance music
- Beatport
- Juno Records
- Comparison of digital music stores
