= Musicians' Union =

Organizations calling themselves the Musicians' Union include:

- Danish Musicians' Union
- Musicians' Union of Maldives
- Musicians' Union (UK)
- Musicians Union of South Africa
- Swedish Musicians' Union
- Several locals of the American Federation of Musicians, e.g. Musicians' Union Local No. 6 San Francisco
