= List of music associations and organizations =

This list includes music associations and music organizations from around the world.

- Academy of Country Music (ACM)
- Alliance of Artists and Recording Companies (AARC)
- American Association of Independent Music (A2IM)
- Association For Electronic Music (AFEM)
- American Federation of Musicians (AFM)
- International Distribution Rights of Administration (INDR Music Association)
- American Federation of Television and Radio Artists (AFTRA)
- American Society of Composers, Authors and Publishers (ASCAP)
- Argentine Chamber of Phonograms and Videograms Producers (CAPIF)
- Asosiasi Industri Rekaman Indonesia (ASIRI)
- Associação Fonográfica Portuguesa (AFP)
- Associação de Músicos Artistas e Editoras Independentes (AMAEI)
- Associação Brasileira dos Produtores de Discos (ABPD)
- Association of Independent Music (AIM)
- Australian Recording Industry Association (ARIA)
- Bureau International des Sociétés Gérant les Droits d'Enregistrement et de Reproduction Mécanique (BIEM)
- Billboard Magazine, known for the Billboard Hot 100
- British Phonographic Industry (BPI)
- Broadcast Music Incorporated (BMI)
- Country Music Association (CMA)
- Emirati Musicians' Association (EMA) in UAE
- European Shakuhachi Society (ESS)
- Federation of the Italian Music Industry (FIMI)
- GEMA in Germany
- Gospel Music Association (GMA)
- Hong Kong Recording Industry Alliance (HKRIA)
- Harry Fox Agency
- Indian Music Industry (IMI)
- International Association of Collaborative Musicians (IACM)
- International Federation of the Phonographic Industry (IFPI)
- Irish Recorded Music Association (IRMA)
- Latin Academy of Recording Arts & Sciences (LARAS)
- Mechanical-Copyright Protection Society (MCPS)
- Music Canada
- Musicians Benevolent Fund
- Musicians' Union (MU)
- Musicians' Union of Maldives
- National Academy of Recording Arts and Sciences (NARAS)
- National Association of Recording Merchandisers (NARM)
- National Association of Pastoral Musicians (NPM)
- National Federation of Music Clubs (NFMC)
- National Music Publishers Association (NMPA)
- Philippine Association of the Record Industry (PARI)
- PRS for Music (PRSM)
- Recording Artists' Coalition (RAC)
- Recording Industry Association of America (RIAA)
- Recording Industry Association of Japan (RIAJ)
- Recording Industry Association of Korea (RIAK)
- Recording Industry Association Singapore (RIAS)
- Recording Industry Association of Malaysia (RIM)
- Recording Industry of South Africa (RISA)
- Recording Industry Foundation in Taiwan (RIT)
- Recorded Music New Zealand (RMNZ)
- Society of European Stage Authors & Composers (SESAC)
- Italian Society of Authors and Publishers (SIAE)
- Sound and Music
- SoundExchange (SE)
- Soundreef
- Thai Entertainment Content Trade Association (TECA)
- Union of Authors and Performers (ZAI)
- Association of Indian Independent Music (AIIM)
- Akhil Bharatiya Gandharva Mahavidyalaya Mandal (ABGMVM)
