= Optus Music Store =

Australian digital music store

The Optus Music Store is an online website and mobile digital media store operated by Optus. Opening as the MTV Music Store (provided by the now defunct company Soundbuzz) in mid-2005, it is a major digital music vendor in Australia. While the previous MTV branded store contained digital rights management files, the re-launched online site (27 July 2009) resulted in DRM being removed.

== Features and restrictions ==
=== Online store ===
The online store contains albums and tracks (MP3 with 30 second preview), tones (delivered to device 'over the air' or straight to the mobile phone from web). The site features re-download (within 5 days) features and dual-download for purchase on-device (see below). The main driver for the re-launch and MP3 was to broaden the attractiveness and accessibility due to the difficulties of DRM/Windows Media issues on the old store, which were featured in many negative reviews.

The online store is 'open' and supports purchases via PayPal. Optus Mobile customers can have charges applied to their regular bill.

=== On-device (mobile) store ===
Accessible from most 2G and 3G mobile phones on the Optus Mobile Network, the Music and separate Tones stores are WAP/mobile web browser compatible. They contain tracks, tones, video and wallpapers and support 15 second previews (on-device music and tone files are DRM protected). Other features include re-download (with five days or initial purchase) and ability to view purchase history.

The on-device stores are restricted to Optus Mobile Customers (and wholesale partner customers).

== See also ==
- Online music store
- Comparison of online music stores
