= Comparison of digital music stores =

Digital music stores sell copies of digital audio, for example in MP3 and WAV file formats. Unlike music streaming services, which typically charge a monthly subscription fee to stream digital audio, digital music stores download songs to the customer's hard disk drive of their device. The customer will have the copy of the song permanently on their disk, provided the track is not deleted by the customer, the disk does not get physically damaged, or suffers from being corrupted. Major examples of digital music stores include iTunes Store, Amazon Music, Bandcamp and 7digital.

Different platforms may offer a different selection of digital audio, for example, some may only sell music that is of a particular genre, or some may only feature independent content.

== Comparison of digital music stores ==
Store	Tracks (million)	Geographic restrictions	Purchase platform	FLAC	ALAC	WAV	AIFF	DSD	AAC	MP3	WMA	Vorbis	DRM	Preview (seconds)	Stream purchases
7digital	81	Yes	Web, Android	24-bit	No	No	No	No	No	320 kbps	No	No	No	30	Yes
Amazon Music	90	Yes	Web, Android	No	No	No	No	No	No	256 kbps	No	No	No	30	Yes
Bandcamp	18.1	No	Web	24-bit	24-bit	24-bit	24-bit	No	Yes	Yes	No	Yes	No	Full	Yes
Beatport	9	Yes	Web	16-bit	No	16-bit	16-bit	No	No	320 kbps	No	No	No	120	Paid service
Bleep	?	No	Web	16-bit	No	24-bit	No	No	No	320 kbps	No	No	No	Full	Yes
Classical Archives	1.17	Yes	Web	No	No	No	No	No	No	320 kbps	No	No	No	60	No
eMusic	17	Yes	Web	No	No	No	No	No	No	320 kbps	No	No	No	60	Yes
HDtracks	?	Yes; US	Web	24-bit	24-bit	24-bit	24-bit	11.3 MHz	No	No	No	No	No	30	?
iTunes Store	100	Yes	Windows, macOS iOS, tvOS	No	No	No	No	No	256 kbps	No	No	No	No (previously FairPlay)	30−90	iTunes in the Cloud
Jamendo	0.21	No	Web	No	No	No	No	No	No	Yes	No	Yes	No	Full	?
mora	4.4	Yes; Japan	Web	24-bit	No	No	No	11.3 MHz	320 kbps	No	No	No	No	30	?
Qobuz	100	Yes	Web, Android, iOS; Kindle, Windows 8	24-bit	24-bit	24-bit	24-bit	22.6 MHz	320 kbps	320 kbps	No	No	No	30-60	Yes
Supraphonline	4.3	No	Web	24-bit	No	No	No	No	No	320 kbps	No	No	No	30+30	?
Volumo	36	No	Web	16-bit	No	16-bit	16-bit	No	No	320 kbps	No	No	No	30-90	No

== Defunct retailers ==
- MSN Music closed on November 14, 2006. Its DRM servers were originally scheduled to shut down August 31, 2008, but they later relented and committed to keeping the DRM servers active through the end of 2011.
- Yahoo! Music Unlimited ceased operating on September 30, 2008. Users' purchases were transferred to Rhapsody.
- BuyMusic was a digital branch of Buy.com, launched around 2003, was later merged into the music section of Buy.com, and then shut down in late 2009.
- Walmart.com operated an online music store, but discontinued it in 2011.
- Puretracks operated an online music store, but discontinued it in 2013.
- Pono Music closed in July 2016.
- GhostTunes closed on March 3, 2017.
- Microsoft's Zune Music Marketplace was rebranded as Xbox Music in 2012. In 2015, Xbox Music purchasing was folded into the Windows Store and Groove Music app. The Windows Store was rebranded as Microsoft Store in 2017, but then the Microsoft Store removed music sales from its store on December 31, 2017.
- Technics Tracks, a reseller of 7digital's services in the UK and Germany, closed on June 30, 2018.
- NoiseTrade's website was closed in 2019, and instead a NoiseTrade section appeared on Paste Magazine's website, until its removal in 2023.
- Onkyo Music, a reseller of 7digital's services, closed worldwide on October 6, 2019.
- CD Baby closed its retail store on March 31, 2020.
- Google Play Music began to shut down its music store in September 2020 and completed its shutdown worldwide by December.
- Acoustic Sounds shut down its Super HiRez digital downloads service on December 31, 2020.
- TIDAL closed its download store on October 20, 2022.
- Magnatune announced it was no longer trading in 2024, however its site would remain active with some free music for visitors to listen to.
- Juno Download shut down on May 31, 2026, with its COO citing the dominance of streaming music services as a major contributing factor.

== See also ==
- Comparison of music streaming services
- Comparison of online music lockers
- List of music software
- List of Internet radio stations
- List of online music databases
