= Published Price to Dealer =

In the music industry, the Published Price to Dealer (PPD) is the wholesale unit price of a recorded work. It is often used in recording industry contracts as a basic figure for defining royalty shares. Compare Suggested Retail List Price (SRLP).

== Uses ==
- In the UK, the cost of a Mechanical-Copyright Protection Society mechanical licence for record labels is set at a percentage of the PPD. This is the same for mechanical licences within continental Europe, with Bureau International de l'Edition Mecanique, which charges 11% of the PPD.
