= Red chlorophyll catabolite reductase =

InterPro Family

Identifiers
- EC no.: 1.3.7.12

Databases
- IntEnz: IntEnz view
- BRENDA: BRENDA entry
- ExPASy: NiceZyme view
- KEGG: KEGG entry
- MetaCyc: metabolic pathway
- PRIAM: profile
- PDB structures: RCSB PDB PDBe PDBsum
Search
- PMC: articles
- PubMed: articles
- NCBI: proteins

RCC_reductase

Identifiers
- Symbol: RCC_reductase
- Pfam: PF06405
- InterPro: IPR009439
Available protein structures:
- PDB: IPR009439 PF06405 (ECOD; PDBsum)
- AlphaFold: IPR009439; PF06405

The red chlorophyll catabolite reductase (RCC reductase) family of proteins consists of several reductase enzymes. They act together with pheophorbide a oxygenase to catalyse the cleavage of pheophorbide a to give stereoisomers of a compound which is the primary chlorophyll breakdown product as plants senesce.

== Function ==
Pheophorbide is a product of chlorophyll breakdown and a derivative of pheophytin where both the central magnesium ion has been removed and the phytol tail has been hydrolyzed.

chlorophyll a
Two steps
pheophorbide

Red chlorophyll catabolite reductase acts while the product of pheophorbide a oxygenase (red chlorophyll catabolite) is still held within that protein. The oxygenase is a Rieske protein containing an iron–sulfur cluster that requires reduced ferredoxin to function. The reductase also requires ferredoxin.

pheophorbide
Oxygenase
red chlorophyll catabolite
Reductase
primary fluorescent
chlorophyll catabolite

The fluorescent product can exist in two diastereomeric forms. All plants in a given genera produce a single isomer.
