= Pheophorbide =

Pheophorbide a

Names
- IUPAC name (3S,4S)-9-Ethenyl-14-ethyl-21-(methoxycarbonyl)-4,8,13,18-tetramethyl-20-oxo-3-phorbinepropanoic acid

Identifiers
| CAS Number | 15664-29-6 |
| 3D model (JSmol) | Interactive image |
| ChEBI | CHEBI:38257 |
| ChemSpider | 10343120 |
| ECHA InfoCard | 100.036.110 |
| EC Number | 239-738-5 |
| KEGG | C18021 |
| PubChem CID | 5323510 |
| UNII | IA2WNI2HO2 |
| CompTox Dashboard (EPA) | DTXSID10884550 |
- InChI: InChI=1S/C35H36N4O5/c1-8-19-15(3)22-12-24-17(5)21(10-11-28(40)41)32(38-24)30-31(35(43)44-7)34(42)29-18(6)25(39-33(29)30)14-27-20(9-2)16(4)23(37-27)13-26(19)36-22/h8,12-14,17,21,31,36,39H,1,9-11H2,2-7H3,(H,40,41)/b22-12-,23-13-,24-12-,25-14-,26-13-,27-14-,32-30-/t17-,21-,31+/m0/s1 Key: NSFSLUUZQIAOOX-QEWKCGBTSA-N
- SMILES: CCC1=C2C=C3C(=C4C(=O)[C@@H](C(=C5[C@H]([C@@H](C(=N5)C=C6C(=C(C(=CC(=C1C)N2)N6)C=C)C)C)CCC(=O)O)C4=N3)C(=O)OC)C

Properties
| Chemical formula | C_{35}H_{36}N_{4}O_{5} |
| Molar mass | 592.68 g/mol |
- Except where otherwise noted, data are given for materials in their standard state (at 25 °C [77 °F], 100 kPa). Infobox references

Pheophorbide or phaeophorbide is a product of chlorophyll breakdown and a derivative of pheophytin where both the central magnesium has been removed and the phytol tail has been hydrolyzed. It is used as a photosensitizer in photodynamic therapy.

Pheophorbide may be generated by digestion of ingested plant matter. Both worm (Caenorhabditis elegans) and mouse mitochondria are able to use the molecule in a form of ad hoc photoheterotrophy.

== In chlorophyll a metabolism ==
Pheophorbide is a product of chlorophyll breakdown and a derivative of pheophytin where both the central magnesium ion has been removed and the phytol tail has been hydrolyzed as plants senesce.

chlorophyll a
Two steps
pheophorbide

Further reactions within the enzymes pheophorbide a oxygenase and red chlorophyll catabolite reductase convert pheophorbide via a red catabolite into a fluorescent final product. The oxygenase is a Rieske protein containing an iron–sulfur cluster that requires reduced ferredoxin to function. The reductase also requires ferredoxin.

pheophorbide
Oxygenase
red chlorophyll catabolite
Reductase
primary fluorescent
chlorophyll catabolite

The fluorescent product can exist in two diastereomeric forms. All plants in a given genera produce a single isomer.

An alternative breakdown pathway for pheophorbide involves the action of pheophorbidase. This enzyme hydrolyses the methyl ester, giving an acid which spontaneously decarboxylates to pyropheophorbide a:

pheophorbide + H_{2}O
CH_{3}OH + CO_{2}
pyropheophorbide a

== See also ==
- Chlorophyll
- Chlorophyll a
- Pheophytin
- Pheophorbidase
- Pheophorbide a oxygenase
- Photodynamic therapy
- Photosensitizer
