= Pheophorbidase =

Class of enzymes

Identifiers
- EC no.: 3.1.1.82

Databases
- BRENDA: enzyme data
- ExPASy: NiceZyme view
- KEGG: enzyme entry
- MetaCyc: metabolic pathway
- Rhea: reactions
- PDB structures: RCSB PDB PDBe PDBsum
Search
- PMC: articles
- PubMed: articles
- NCBI: proteins

Pheophorbidase (EC 3.1.1.82, phedase, PPD) is an enzyme with systematic name pheophorbide-a hydrolase. It catalyses the overall reaction:

pheophorbide
H_{2}O
CH_{3}OH + CO_{2}
pyropheophorbide a

The enzyme characterised from plants including radish hydrolyses the methyl ester of pheophorbide. This initially gives the corresponding acid, which spontaneously decarboxylates to pyropheophorbide a. The reaction is part of chlorophyll degradation during senescence.
