= Pheophorbide a oxygenase =

Class of enzymes

Identifiers
- EC no.: 1.14.15.17

Databases
- IntEnz: IntEnz view
- BRENDA: BRENDA entry
- ExPASy: NiceZyme view
- KEGG: KEGG entry
- MetaCyc: metabolic pathway
- PRIAM: profile
- PDB structures: RCSB PDB PDBe PDBsum
Search
- PMC: articles
- PubMed: articles
- NCBI: proteins

Pheophorbide a oxygenase (EC 1.14.15.17, pheide a monooxygenase, pheide a oxygenase, PAO) is an enzyme with systematic name pheophorbide-a,NADPH:oxygen oxidoreductase (biladiene-forming). This enzyme catalyses the following chemical reaction

pheophorbide a
+ 2 reduced
ferredoxin
2 H^{+} + O_{2}
red chlorophyll catabolite
+ 2 oxidised
ferredoxin

Pheophorbide a oxygenase participates in chlorophyll degradation. It is a Rieske protein containing an iron–sulfur cluster. It requires reduced ferredoxin to function. Loss-of-function mutations in the gene can lead to a stay-green phenotype in plants.

The red chlorophyll catabolite which is the product of this enzyme is rapidly converted to by red chlorophyll catabolite reductase to the primary fluorescent chlorophyll catabolite.
