= BuyMusic =

Paid online music store

- Website type: Music downloads
- Website: www.buymusic.com
- Launched: July 2003; 23 years ago

BuyMusic was a paid online music store run by Buy.com.

== History ==
The store was launched in July 2003 with 300,000 tracks available and was designed to compete with iTunes Music Store because at the time of launch, Apple's store was limited to Macintosh users, and BuyMusic was the first to offer paid downloads to non-Mac users. Unlike iTunes Music Store, the price of each song ranges from 80¢ to US$1.99. Reportedly in 2003, the site claimed to be "The World’s Largest Download Music Store."

The site used to have extreme limitations on what users could browse. It would not allow anyone not using Microsoft Windows and Internet Explorer 5.0 or greater to even view the songs available. Even users that met the stated requirements could encounter trouble—clicking the main "click here" link routinely crashed some user's IE 5.5 browsers. Before the spring 2004 integration with its parent site, Buy.com, users that did not meet the stated requirements couldn't even access static content such as press releases. Since the integration, all users can access all of Buy.com.

The site has provided no statistics regarding the number of customers and downloads, yet Scott Blum, founder and CEO of BuyMusic, noted "We're nowhere near Apple's iTunes Music Store numbers." in a December 2003 interview.

Though the download service's closure was never officially announced, it had quietly disappeared by December 2009, if not before; Buy.com's press releases stopped mentioning it sometime in 2007. The buymusic.com URL formerly redirected to Buy.com's physical CD store, and later redirects to Rakuten but now times out.
