= Classical Archives =

Online digital music store

Classical Archives LLC
- Classical Archives Homepage, June 21, 2010
- Launch date: August 2000; 25 years ago
- Pricing model: Downloads for purchase, unlimited streaming by subscription
- Website: classicalarchives.com

Classical Archives LLC is an online digital music store that solely focuses on classical music. Originally opening as the Classical MIDI Archives in 1994 primarily as a repository for free MIDI sequences of classical music works, in August 2000 the site incorporated as Classical Archives, LLC, and has since been also offering commercial label recordings for both streaming and downloading.

Both members and non-members can access detailed musicological information for each work: movements, genre, principal instruments, year of composition, and key. Additionally, nearly every composer's biography is provided. Free radio streaming is available for computers and mobile devices that also includes a device to close the connection in one hour, if desired.

Classical Archives uses a proprietary system (called the Contextual Metadata Engine) that allows for the ingestion and cataloguing of all recordings based on musicological accurate and uniform metadata. Because of the Contextual Metadata Engine, visitors can search and cross-reference by various relevant criteria: composer, work title, artist, albums, historical period, instrument, and genre, in order to find and compare different recordings. The website also includes a section on composers (the greats, the notables or all), which include Leonard Berstein, George Gershwin and more.

Classical Archives was founded by CEO Pierre R. Schwob. The cataloguing of the Classical Archives database is carried out by a team of musicologists led by Chief Musicologist and Artistic Director Dr. Nolan Gasser.

== File types ==
The site provides 320 kbit/s MP3 files for downloads and 160 kbit/s AAC files for streaming. Sample clips are streamed at 60 kbit/s for non-members.

== Database ==
As of May 22, 2011, the Classical Archives database features 12,046 composers, 42,744 recording artists, and 26,697 Albums from 268 labels. These include the classical catalogues of Universal Music Group (Deutsche Grammophon, Decca, Phillips, ECM, etc.), Sony (RCA, Columbia, etc.), Naxos (BIS, Chandos, Hänssler Classic, etc.), and many independent labels through IODA (Harmonia Mundi, Nimbus, Summit, etc.). As of June 2011, the Classical Archives has 904,230 registered members.

== Other site features ==
- Exclusive Interviews: Artistic Director Nolan Gasser has conducted exclusive interviews with international performers and composers including Marin Alsop, American Brass Quintet, Vladimir Ashkenazy, Joshua Bell, Ray Chen, Gloria Coates, John Corigliano, Jeremy Denk, Danielle de Niese, Simone Dinnerstein, JoAnn Falletta, Renee Fleming, David Finckel, Alan Gilbert, Vittorio Grigolo, Hélène Grimaud, Hillary Hahn, Wu Han, Paul Hillier, Daniel Hope, Sharon Isbin, David Lang, Lang Lang, Mark Padmore, Sondra Radvanovsky, Ryuichi Sakamoto, Stile Antico, Trio Mediaeval, Susan Wadsworth, Xiayin Wang, and Eric Whitacre.
- Free One Click Concerts™: A concert length program of selected tracks based on either a special theme, composer, period, or genre.
- Free Classical Archives Internet Radio Stream Broadcast for computers and mobile devices
- About pages for composers and works. Powered by All Music Guide, biographies and work descriptions provide musicological and historical background.
- Playlists: Members have access to playlists that are created by other members and Classical Archives staff.
- Essentials: For each composer, a list of historically important works is presented.
