= Musicians' Union of Maldives =

Non-governmental organization

- Musicians' Union of Maldives
- މިއުޒިޝަންސް ޔޫނިއަން އޮފް މޯލްޑިވްސް
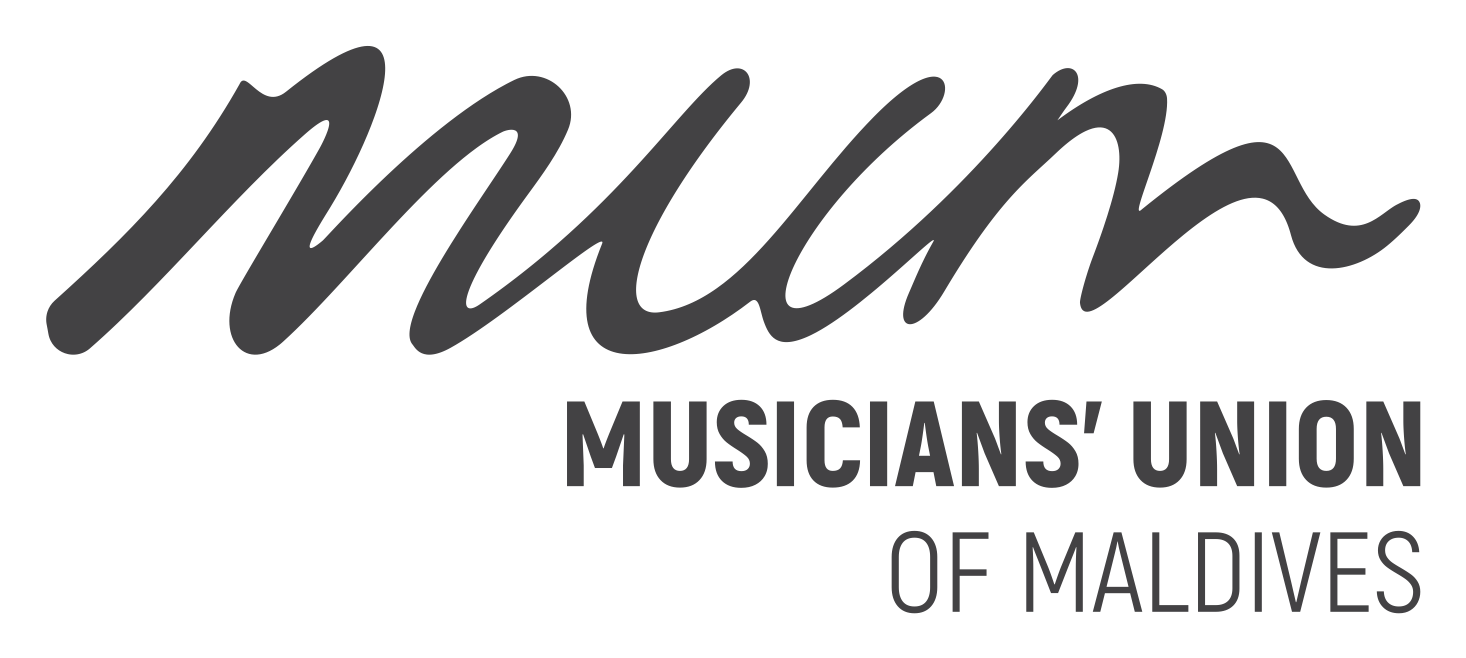
- Abbreviation: M.U.M
- Founded: 2020
- Founder: Ahmed Shiham, Mahran Mohamed Majid, Nishfa Nashid
- Headquarters: Male’
- Location: Maldives
- Members: 245 (2022)
- Secretary General: Hamza Khaleel
- President: Ahmed Shiham
- Vice president: Moosa Athfal
- Website: musiciansunion.mv

The Musicians' Union of Maldives (M.U.M) is a non-government organization that represents the interests of musicians working in all sectors of the music industry in the Maldives.

M.U.M was officially registered at the Ministry of Youth, Sports and Community Empowerment on 20 July 2020, and has over 200 members to date. As of 25 May 2021, M.U.M is also registered as a Charitable Organization at the Maldives Inland Revenue Authority.

== History ==
Although there were numerous attempts at forming an organization for representing musicians throughout generations of musical history in the Maldives, M.U.M was the first one to be successfully established. M.U.M was formed during the COVID-19 pandemic, when tourist resorts were halting operations due to worldwide travel restrictions. Most musicians in the Maldives work as third-party contractors for tourist resorts, and as they halted operations, so did the livelihood of the musicians. Additionally, a lot of musicians were struggling to register for the Income Support Allowance that was being provided by the government at the time as well. This led to the founders of the union, along with numerous other musicians to organize and form the union, to collectively advocate for and on behalf of all the musicians in the Maldives.

The union was invited to be a part of the Advisory Committee for Income Support Allowance formed by the Ministry of Economic Development, and worked with the ministry to revise the eligibility criteria, while also serving as a mediator between musicians and the Ministry. Around the same time, M.U.M also started a campaign calling to end long-term illegal recruitment of foreign musicians in tourist resorts of the Maldives. It is illegal for foreign artists to be employed over local artists in the Maldives under the country's "Foreign Employees Act" and the Maldives Immigration decided to pursue action against businesses and entities who were illegally employing foreigners in the Maldives.

In 2022, M.U.M collaborated with Dhivehi Insurance to introduce insurance package exclusively tailored for artists. The union also partnered with locally renowned law firm S&A Lawyers LLP to provide pro bono legal services to union members. M.U.M has also partnered with the Ministry of Tourism for the events organized as part of the 50th anniversary of the Maldives tourism industry and also represented musicians at the 2022 UNWTO Global Summit on Community-based Tourism held at Crossroads Maldives and Paradise Island Resort and Spa.

== Governance ==
The members of the executive committee of the Musicians' Union of Maldives are as follows:

Name	Position
Ahmed Shiham	President
Moosa Athfal	Vice President
Aimon Latheef	Treasurer
Hamza Khaleel	Secretary General
Aminath Shua Shujau Abdul Hannan	Public Relations Director

== Partners ==
- S&A Lawyers
- Alliance française
- Ooredoo Maldives
- Dhivehi Insurance
- Highrise
- The Islandchief
- Seagull Cafe' House
- Meraki Coffee Rosters
- The Trading Company
