= PRS for Music =

British music rights society

- Industry: Financial and Legal Collections
- Predecessor: British Copyright Protection Company; MCPS-PRS Alliance Limited, the; Mechanical-Copyright Protection Society; Performing Right Society
- Founded: 1914; 112 years ago
- Headquarters: London, United Kingdom
- Key people: Andrea C. Martin (CEO)
- Revenue: ▲£537.4m / Distributed £460.9m (2015); ▲£621.5m / Distributed £527.6m (2016); ▲£717.0m / Distributed £605.1m (2017); ▲£746.0m / Distributed £648.4m (2018); ▲£810.8m / Distributed £686m (2019); ▼£650.5m / Distributed £699.4m (2020); ▲£777.1m / Distributed £677.2m (2021); ▲£964m / Distributed £836m (2022); ▲£1.08bn / Distributed £943.6m (2023)
- Website: prsformusic.com

PRS for Music Limited (formerly The MCPS-PRS Alliance Limited) is a British music copyright collective, made up of two collection societies: the Mechanical-Copyright Protection Society (MCPS) and the Performing Right Society (PRS). It undertakes collective rights management for musical works on behalf of its 175,000 members. PRS for Music was formed in 1997 following the MCPS-PRS Alliance. In 2009, PRS and MCPS-PRS Alliance realigned their brands and became PRS for Music.

PRS represents their songwriter, composer and music publisher members’ performing rights, and collects royalties on their behalf whenever their music is played or performed publicly.

MCPS also represents songwriters, composers and music publishers – representing their mechanical rights, and collects royalties whenever their music is reproduced as a physical product – this includes CDs, DVDs, digital downloads and broadcast or online.

PRS (Performing Right Society) and MCPS (Mechanical Copyright Protection Society) are two separate collection societies with PRS running its own operations, providing services to MCPS under the name PRS for Music. As of 2018 PRS has entered a joint venture with Phonographic Performance Limited (PPL) under a newly formed private company called PPL PRS Ltd with the aim of making it easier for their customers to obtain a music licence.

== History ==
The Performing Right Society was founded in 1914 by a group of music publishers, to protect the value of copyright and to help provide an income for composers, songwriters and music publishers. At the time, PRS collected fees for live performance from sheet music. This was done in major part following the death and financial struggle of British composer Samuel Coleridge-Taylor and the exploitation of his music; particularly his composition Song of Hiawatha, for which he was paid a flat fee of 15 guineas.

PRS was distinct from both the activities of the Mechanical-Copyright Protection Society which was founded in 1910, and the Phonographic Performance Limited (PPL), founded in 1934 by Decca and EMI.

The Mechanical-Copyright Protection Society began as Mecolico, the Mechanical Copyright Licenses Company, which was founded in 1910 in anticipation of the Copyright Act 1911. Mecolico licensed the mechanical rights within musical works and merged with the Copyright Protection Society in 1924. Phonographic Performance Limited (PPL) collected fees for playing gramophone recordings.

Another agency, the British Copyright Protection Company or Britico was founded in 1932 by Alphonse Tournier, specialising on collecting royalties in the UK on French and German musical copyright, and becoming the British Copyright Protection Association in 1962. This company, Britico, started to share computer facilities with PRS in 1970.

== Tariffs ==
PRS for Music administers the performance rights and mechanical rights of about 41 million musical works on behalf of its songwriters, composers and publishing members and in 2018 processed over 11.1 trillion uses of music. PRS for Music licenses and collects royalties for its members' musical works whenever they are publicly performed, or recordings of them are broadcast, streamed online or played in public spaces, both in the UK and globally through its partner network.

After operating costs are deducted, the remaining money is distributed to PRS for Music's songwriter, composer and publisher members and to affiliate societies.

The principal sources of PRS for Music revenue collection are broadcasting (i.e. radio and television channels), public performance (i.e. music at gigs, concerts, theatres, restaurants, retailers and workplaces), online (i.e. music streamed online, digitally downloaded), and international.

PRS for Music also has a number of tariffs for organisations in different sectors (businesses, government organisations, educational establishments, and so on). Dependent on their size and the extent to which each premises uses music, whether they are commercial premises or not, as well as other criteria, PRS for Music's tariffs vary.

Around 350,000 UK businesses have paid and are licensed to play music under a PRS for Music licence, however some workplaces do not need one:

- Inpatient and treatment areas in hospitals
- Medical day centres
- Residential homes (in most circumstances)
- Music used in divine worship (although licences are required for copyrighted music)
- Civil wedding ceremonies and partnership ceremonies
- Lone and home workers.

In 2018, PPL and PRS for Music formed a jointly owned subsidiary, PPL PRS Ltd, to collect all licence fees for public performances. PPL PRS Ltd is based in Leicester, England.

== Initiatives ==
=== ICE – Global Licensing Hub ===
In July 2015, PRS for Music, Sweden collecting society STIM and German collecting society GEMA announced the completion of a joint venture to launch an integrated multi-territory music licensing and processing hub covering European territories. In November 2015, it was confirmed the new hub would be called 'ICE'.

=== PRS for Music and PPL joint venture for public performance licensing ===
In February 2016, PRS for Music and PPL, the body who licenses the sound recording of a song, confirmed plans to create a new joint venture for public performance licensing. The new joint venture would focus on servicing all UK public performance licensing customers. The joint venture launched in 2018.

=== Streamfair ===
In July 2015, PRS for Music launched a pro-creator campaign called Streamfair. The campaign focused on four areas, Copyright Legislation, Online Licensing, Promoting the value of music creators and education. The campaign was supported by acclaimed songwriters and composers including Jimmy Napes, Michael Price, Crispin Hunt, Gary Clark and Debbie Wiseman.

=== Heritage Awards ===
The PRS for Music Heritage Award scheme launched in 2009 with the first award going to Blur. Ceremonial plaques are unveiled to honour the performance birthplaces of legendary bands, artists and songwriters - as well as recognising the network of pubs, clubs and live music venues. Those honoured include Squeeze, Elton John, Pulp, Queen and UB40.

== Financial information ==
In May 2016, PRS for Music announced its 2015 financial results, which showed an 8.4% increase in distributions to its songwriter members. The figures for 2016 were announced in May 2017 showing that revenues increased by 10.1% and royalty payments to its members increased to £527.6 m (up 11.1%). The organisation reported record royalty distributions in 2017, with a payout of £605.1 m (up 14.7%).

Business area	2014 (£m)	2015 (£m)	2016 (£m)	2017 (£m)	2018 (£m)	2019 (£m)	2020 (£m)	2021 (£m)	2022 (£m)	2023 (£m)
International	188.3	195.6	233.7	261.4	280.60	278.7	248.6	242.4	272.4	310.0
Public Performance	168.3	175.2	183.2	198.1	192.0	222.2	86.2	137.6	228.9	262.0
Broadcast	124.2	119.3	124.1	134.6	127.7	130.8	127.4	129.3	128.7	131.0
Online	37.6	37.6	80.5	122.9	145.7	179.1	188.3	267.8	334	377.0
Total	513.5	537.4	621.5	717.0	746.0	810.8	650.5	777.1	964.0	1,080.0

The 2023 figures were announced in 2024, showing total revenues exceeding £1 billion for the first time.

== Licensing ==
=== Legal cases ===
In 2007, PRS for Music took a Scottish car servicing company to court because the employees were allegedly "listening to the radio at work, allowing the music to be 'heard by colleagues and customers'". In June 2008, PRS for Music accused Lancashire Constabulary of playing music at police stations not covered by a license, and sought an injunction and payments for damages.

In 2014, PRS for Music and commercial broadcaster ITV failed to negotiate a licensing deal resulting in a Copyright Tribunal dispute. In July 2016, The Copyright Tribunal awarded in favour of PRS for Music. ITV appealed and subsequently lost a High Court appeal in early 2017.

In 2015, PRS for Music entered into a licensing agreement with the Berlin-based company SoundCloud after several months of litigation. Terms of the deal were not disclosed.

=== Cross-border European licensing ===
The Santiago Agreement was established in 2000 between five European collecting societies including the UK's PRS for Music, France's SACEM, and Germany's GEMA. The agreement allows each collecting society to collect royalties on behalf of members of the other collecting society, e.g. PRS for Music would collect money for German artists listed with GEMA, but to restrict licences to be sold only within the member organisation's home country.

=== Schools ===
Along with Phonographic Performance Limited (PPL), PRS for Music use the Centre for Education and Finance Management (CEFM) as agents to collect licensing money from schools and colleges. Universities have separate arrangements.

=== Enforcement ===
In 2008, PRS for Music began a concerted drive to make commercial premises pay for annual "performance" licences. In one case it told a 61-year-old mechanic that he would have to pay £150 to play his radio while he worked by himself. It also targeted a bakery that played a radio in a private room at the back of the shop, a woman who used a classical radio to calm her horses and community centres that allowed children to sing carols in public. However, questions have been raised about the tactic of targeting small businesses:

Radio stations pay large amounts of money to licensing organizations PRS and PPL for the music they play, and music has been on the radio for many years. During the war, there were programmes like Workers Playtime and Music While You Work. Now, many radio stations have features about workplaces. If the PRS force people to switch their radios off then how are these stations going to survive? Music has to be heard before people go out and buy it.

—The Bolton News

In March 2009, the online video-sharing site YouTube removed all premium music videos for UK users, even those supplied by record labels, due to a failure to find "mutually acceptable terms for a new licence" with PRS for Music. As a consequence, PRS for Music established the Fair Play for Creators campaign in order to provide a forum where musicians could "publicly demonstrate their concern over the way their work is treated by online businesses". David Arnold, Jazzie B, Billy Bragg, Guy Chambers, Robin Gibb, Pete Waterman, Mike Chapman, Wayne Hector, Pam Sheyne and Debbie Wiseman sent a letter to The Times newspaper in support of the campaign launched by PRS for Music. A rights deal was settled in September 2009 between PRS for Music and Google that allowed YouTube users in UK to view music videos.

Wiltshire Constabulary refused to pay PRS for Music for a £32,000 licence fee in April 2009. Instead the force told all officer and civilian staff that music could no longer be played in their workplaces but that ban excluded patrol cars. A total of 38 of 49 UK police forces currently hold PRS for Music licences.

In May 2009, the British Chambers of Commerce published a survey of business attitudes to PRS for Music. Just 6% of companies rated their experience as good or excellent. In contrast, over half said their experience had been poor or very poor. Businesses were also asked to submit comments about their experiences. Many of these replies referred to the PRS for Music's behaviour as "aggressive" and "threatening".

In October 2009, PRS for Music apologised to a 56-year-old shelf-stacker at a village in Clackmannanshire for pursuing her for singing to herself while stacking shelves. PRS for Music initially told her that she would be prosecuted and fined thousands of pounds if she continued to sing without a "live performance" licence. However PRS for Music subsequently acknowledged its mistake.

In October 2010, it was reported that Sussex Police, in a money-saving move, were not intending to renew their PRS for Music licence, meaning that police officers would no longer be able to listen to the radio in their squad cars or other work places.

== Independent Welsh agency ==
In 2012, a high per centage of Welsh-language musicians left PRS for Music to form a separate agency, Eos (Welsh for nightingale), after changes in the way PRS for Music calculates royalties led to a fifteen-fold decrease in payments. In 2007, PRS for Music had reclassified Welsh-language station BBC Radio Cymru as a local station, where previously it had been considered a national station. This led to a decrease in royalty rates from £7.50 per minute to 50p per minute of broadcast music. The English-language sister station, BBC Radio Wales, is classified by PRS for Music as a national station and attracts the higher rates.

As of December 2012, Eos is in negotiations with the BBC, whose Welsh-language service is highly dependent on its members' output. From 1 January 2013, a PRS licence will not be required to play such music, and will not give any permission to do so.
