= Mechanical-Copyright Protection Society =

Performing rights organisation in the United Kingdom

Mechanical-Copyright Protection Society (MCPS)
- Industry: Mechanical Royalties (Music)
- Founded: 1910; 116 years ago
- Headquarters: London, United Kingdom
- Key people: Paul Clements (CEO)
- Website: mpaonline.org.uk

The Mechanical-Copyright Protection Society (MCPS) is an organisation that collects royalties and protects rights for music publisher, songwriter and composer members, when their music is reproduced, in any format – including online, physical and synchronised.

The MCPS collects and pays royalties to members when their music is:

- copied and used in physical products (such as records, CDs and DVDs)
- streamed or downloaded on services such as Spotify, Apple Music, Netflix and Amazon
- synchronised into audio-visual entertainment including TV, film, video games and advertising
- on radio.

The MPA Group owns and operates MCPS on behalf of over 30,000 music publisher, songwriter and composer members.

== History ==
The Mechanical-Copyright Protection Society was established in its first form in 1910 as Mecolico, the Mechanical Copyright Licenses Company. This was in anticipation of the introduction of the Copyright Act 1911, which formally accredited copyright to sound recordings.

Mecolico was the first organisation to license mechanical rights in the UK and subsequently joined with the Copyright Protection Society in 1924. Together, they were innovative in collecting mechanical royalties from mass-produced discs.

The Music Publishers Association, the trade association for music publishers in the UK, became the owners of MCPS in 1976 and remain so to this day. This union establishes MCPS as the only collection society which is publisher-led.

MCPS co-formed the MCPS-PRS Alliance with the Performing Right Society Limited (PRS) in 1997 and developed the joint online licence in 2002, aiming to encourage the growth of digital music services, while protecting the rights of its members and collecting royalties for onward distribution to them. Since 2009 the alliance is known as PRS for Music.

A restructuring of MCPS' partnership with PRS was announced in 2013, which introduced a series of Service Level Agreements (SLAs) between the companies. The first SLA, in place since 2013, laid the foundations for the new MCPS/PRS relationship, with PRS becoming MCPS’ outsourced service provider. More detailed data reporting became a focus with both management teams closely collaborating. Most recently in 2021, MCPS and PRS announced a new SLA effective until December 2025, assuring closer collaboration between MCPS and PRS in the best interests of publisher, songwriter and composer members, while maintaining their shared value of customer-centricity.

In 2021, MCPS delivered its highest distribution of royalties to publisher, songwriter and composer members since 2012. Statutory accounts, published in 2021 show distributions for the year ended 31 December 2020 were £157.8m; a 10% increase of £14.4m from 2019. These strong returns reflect the growing demand for mechanical licensing globally.

In 2022, MCPS announced the highest per year distribution of royalties to its publisher, songwriter and composer members since 2009. Total distributions for the year ended 31 December 2021 are £181.7m; a strong 15% increase of £23.8m over 2020. MCPS also announced a 10% reduction in commissions for all publisher, direct composer and songwriter members, effective Monday 1 August 2022.

In other news for the organisation, Jackie Alway OBE, Executive VP of International Legal & Industry Affairs at Universal Music Publishing Group (UMPG), was elected as the first woman to hold the role of Chairperson of MCPS in 2020.

MCPS sponsors the AIM Awards and Production Music Awards.

== Production music ==
Production music is produced primarily for synchronisation licensing purposes and provides users with an alternative to licensing commercially released music or commissioned music. MCPS offers production music written by professional songwriters and composers which is pre-cleared for any type of usage. MCPS production music provides a library of tracks to choose from and an application process enabling customers to obtain a licence on the same day.

== MCPS synchronisation (sync) licence ==
For unpublished writers and new publishers, MCPS represents many of its members for sync, handling the process of negotiation, licensing and invoicing on their behalf.
