= Karunadasa =

Karunadasa is a surname. Notable people with the surname include:

- Hemamala Karunadasa, Sri Lankan academic
- Y. Karunadasa, Sri Lankan scholar
