= Michael Saliba =

German physicist and materials scientist

- Born: 1983 (age 42–43)
- Citizenship: German
- Education: University of Oxford (DPhil); University of Stuttgart (Physics & Mathematics)
- Known for: Perovskite materials; Combinatorial material design; Plasmonics
- Awards: Acatech Senior Academician (2026); Clarivate Highly Cited Researcher (Top 1%); IEEE Stuart R. Wenham Award (2024); Helmholtz High Impact Award (2023); E-MRS EU-40 Materials Prize (2022); German Research Foundation Heinz Maier-Leibnitz-Preis (2020); MIT TR35 (2017)
- Scientific career
- Fields: Physics · Chemistry · Materials science · Photovoltaics
- Workplaces: University of Stuttgart (Director, Institute for Photovoltaics); Forschungszentrum Jülich
- Thesis: Plasmonic Nanostructures and Film Crystallization in Perovskite Solar Cells (2014)
- Doctoral advisor: Henry Snaith
- Other academic advisors: Michael Grätzel
- Website: www.ipv.uni-stuttgart.de

Michael Saliba (born 1983) is a German physicist and materials scientist. He is a full professor at the University of Stuttgart, where he directs the Institute for Photovoltaics. He is also affiliated with the Forschungszentrum Jülich as part of the Helmholtz Association. Saliba is widely known for his foundational research on perovskite solar cells and has been consecutively listed as a Highly Cited Researcher by Clarivate since 2018.

== Education and career ==
Saliba completed his undergraduate and graduate studies in physics and mathematics at the University of Stuttgart. He completed his master thesis in physics at the Max Planck Institute for Solid State Research with Klaus Kern. His academic background includes research periods at Cornell University and the University of Adelaide, followed by a DPhil in physics at the University of Oxford with Henry Snaith. Following his doctorate, Saliba was a Marie Skłodowska-Curie Fellow at the École Polytechnique Fédérale de Lausanne (EPFL) with Anders Hagfeldt and Michael Grätzel. This was followed by a research stay at Stanford University with Mike McGehee.

In 2018, he became a group leader at the University of Fribourg. In 2019, he was appointed as a tenure-track assistant professor at the Technical University of Darmstadt. In 2020, Saliba was appointed full professor and Director of the Institute for Photovoltaics at the University of Stuttgart, alongside a dual appointment at Forschungszentrum Jülich. In 2026, he completed a research sabbatical as a Gerhard R. Andlinger Visiting Fellow at Princeton University.

== Research ==
Saliba's research focuses on next-generation optoelectronics, primarily metal-halide perovskite semiconductors. His most highly cited contribution is a combinatorial material design strategy that formulates and stabilizes multicomponent perovskites. This approach has been widely adopted as it systematically addresses crystal degradation issues, improving both the efficiency and long-term durability of the materials.

This stabilization strategy also forms the basis of his work on multi-junction tandem solar cells. By stacking perovskite layers over conventional silicon, his research aims to bypass traditional silicon efficiency limits for renewable energy applications. He further investigated these sustainable energy technologies during a sabbatical as a Gerhard R. Andlinger Visiting Fellow at Princeton University.

Beyond photovoltaics, Saliba's semiconductor research extends to other high-performance optoelectronic architectures. This includes the development of light-emitting diodes (LEDs), lasers, photodetectors, and ultra-fast scintillators used in medical diagnostics. His foundational work also encompasses light-matter interactions in plasmonic nanostructures and photon recycling within thin-film devices.

== Selected publications ==
Saliba has authored over 250 scientific publications and holds multiple patents in the fields of perovskite optoelectronics, photovoltaics, and plasmonics. Notable research contributions include:

- Saliba, Michael; et al. (2016). "Cesium-containing triple cation perovskite solar cells: improved stability, reproducibility and high efficiency". Energy & Environmental Science. 9 (6): 1989–1997. doi:10.1039/C5EE03874J. PMC 4936376.
- Saliba, Michael; et al. (2016). "Incorporation of rubidium cations into perovskite solar cells improves photovoltaic performance". Science. 354 (6309): 206–209. doi:10.1126/science.aah5557.
- Turren-Cruz, Silver-Hamill; Hagfeldt, Anders; Saliba, Michael; et al. (2018). "Methylammonium-free, high-performance, and stable perovskite solar cells on a planar architecture". Science. 362 (6413): 449–453. doi:10.1126/science.aat3583.

== Awards and recognition ==
Saliba has been consistently listed as a Highly Cited Researcher by Clarivate since 2018. His contributions to materials science and photovoltaics have been recognized with the following international and national honors:

- 2026: Elected Member of the Acatech (German Academy of Science and Engineering).
- 2024: Stuart R. Wenham Young Professional Award, IEEE PVSC.
- 2023: Helmholtz High Impact Award.
- 2023: Kavli Foundation Early Career Lectureship in Materials Science, MRS.
- 2022: EU-40 Materials Prize, E-MRS.
- 2021: Curious Minds Research Award, Merck.
- 2021: ERC Starting Grant.
- 2020: Heinz Maier-Leibnitz-Preis, DFG.
- 2017: TR35, MIT Technology Review.
- 2017: Fraunhofer UMSICHT Science Award.
- 2016: Young Scientist Award, German University Association (DHV).

== Professional service ==
Saliba holds several leadership positions in international scientific organizations and academic publishing. He is the founding Editor-in-Chief of the journal EES Solar from the Royal Society of Chemistry. He serves on the editorial advisory boards of several leading journals, including ACS Energy Letters and Materials Today.

In the realm of research governance, Saliba has been a prominent advocate for the next generation of researchers, serving as Co-Chair of the Global Young Academy (2020–2022) and a Board Member of the Young Academy of Germany (2020–2021). Within his home institution, he serves as the Speaker for the DFG-funded Graduate School for "Quantum Engineering" at the University of Stuttgart. Furthermore, he convenes major international scientific gatherings, such as the 2025 Nature Conference "Advancing Perovskite-Based Photovoltaics," which addressed the transition from fundamental research to industrial deployment.
