= Michelle Chang =

Michelle Chang may refer to:

- Michelle Chang (biochemist) (born 1977), American chemist
- Michelle and Julia Chang, fictional characters from the Tekken series of fighting games
