= Danna Freedman =

American inorganic chemist

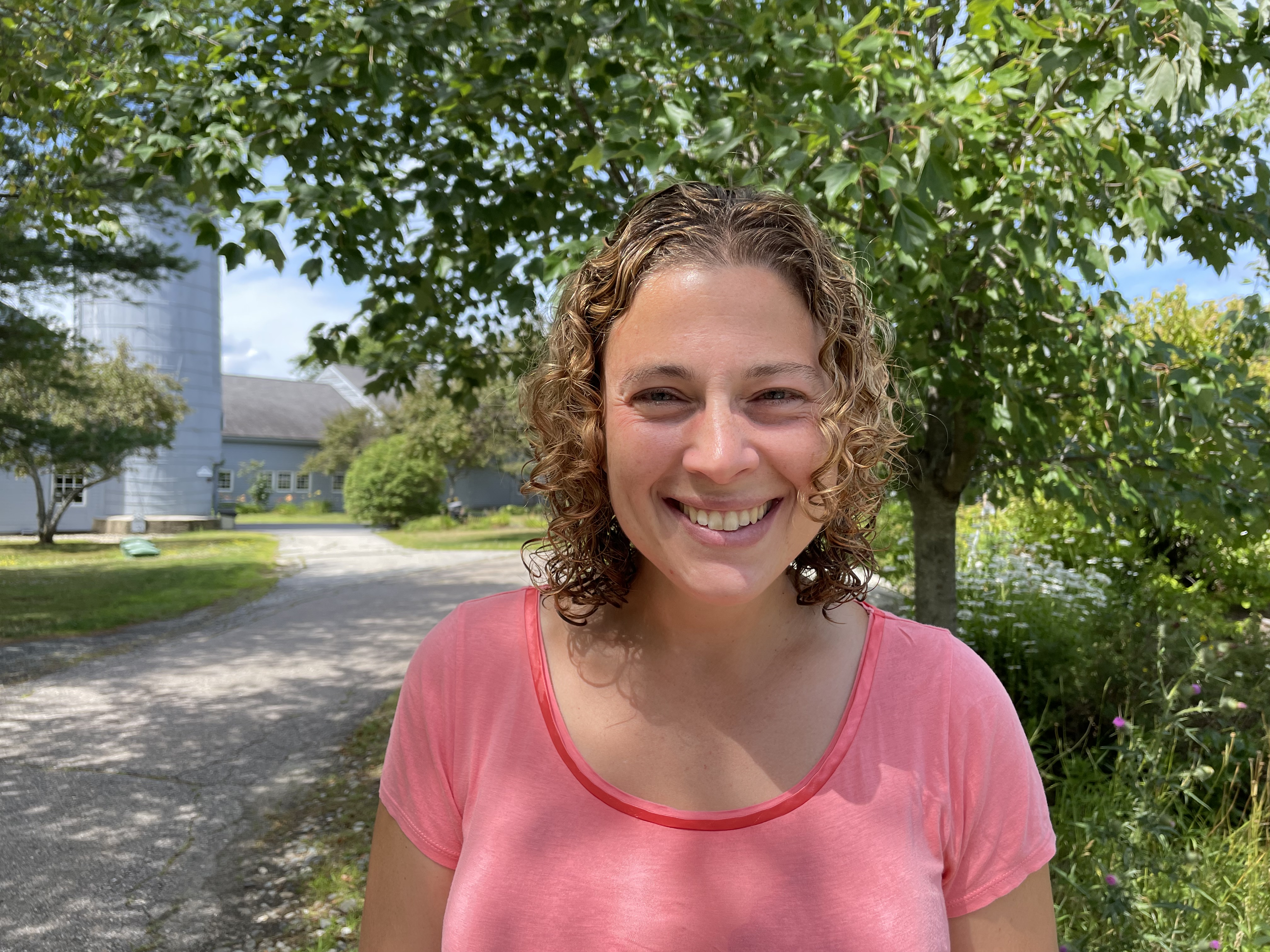
- Born: Danna Erit Freedman
- Education: Harvard University (A.B.) (2003); University of California, Berkeley (Ph.D) (2009)
- Awards: MacArthur Fellowship (2022); ACS Award in Pure Chemistry (2019); Presidential Early Career Award for Scientists and Engineers (2017); Sloan Research Fellowship (2015)
- Scientific career
- Workplaces: Northwestern University; Massachusetts Institute of Technology
- Thesis: Increasing Anisotropy in Single-Molecule Magnets (2009)
- Doctoral advisor: Jeffrey R. Long
- Other academic advisors: Daniel G. Nocera; Hongkun Park
- Website: https://freedmanlab-mit.com

Danna Freedman is an American chemist and the Frederick George Keyes Professor of Chemistry at the Massachusetts Institute of Technology. Her group's research focuses on applying inorganic chemistry towards questions in physics, with an emphasis on quantum information science, materials with emergent properties, and magnetism. Freedman was awarded the 2019 ACS Award in Pure Chemistry and a MacArthur Fellowship in 2022.

== Early life and education ==
Freedman grew up in Upstate New York. As a teenager, she led educational programmes for young people at the Kopernik Observatory & Science Center. Freedman earned her undergraduate degree in chemistry at Harvard University, working under the supervision of Hongkun Park, investigating ways to engineer defects into carbon nanotubes. She was first introduced to magnetic molecules as part of a collaboration between Park and Jeffrey Long. She moved to University of California, Berkeley for her graduate studies, joining Long's laboratory who were investigating molecular magnetism. Whilst in California, Freedman investigated the magnetic anisotropy of single-molecule magnets and polynuclear clusters.

== Research and career ==
After graduating in 2009, Freedman moved to the Massachusetts Institute of Technology, where she worked in the laboratory of Daniel G. Nocera. At MIT, Freedman studied quantum spin liquids, Kagome lattices and spin frustration. Freedman spent three years as a postdoctoral fellow before joining the faculty at Northwestern University. She also serves as deputy director of the Center for Molecular Quantum Transduction, and in 2020 was promoted to full professor. In 2021 she became the Frederick George Keyes Professor of Chemistry at MIT.

She has continued to study Kagome lattices, and showed that by compressing a magnetically frustrated mineral jarosite it was possible to form a new, exotic magnetic state. In this state, Freedman proposes that long range magnetic order is lost when the antisymmetric Dzyaloshinski-Moriya exchange interaction vanishes. In 2017 Freedman created the first binary compound of iron bismuth. Her research investigates the development of molecules whose spin states can act as quantum bits (so-called qubits), where quantum information is encoded onto magnetic (spin) states.

=== Awards and honors ===
- Sloan Research Fellowship
- 2017 Presidential Early Career Award for Scientists and Engineers
- 2018 Kavli Frontiers of Science Fellow
- 2018 Dreyfus Teacher-Scholar
- 2019 American Chemical Society Award in Pure Chemistry
- 2022 MacArthur Fellowship

=== Selected publications ===
Her publications include:

- Freedman, Danna E.; Harman, W. Hill; Harris, T. David; Long, Gary J.; Chang, Christopher J.; Long, Jeffrey R. (2010). "Slow Magnetic Relaxation in a High-Spin Iron(II) Complex". Journal of the American Chemical Society. 132 (4): 1224–1225. Bibcode:2010JAChS.132.1224F. doi:10.1021/ja909560d. ISSN 0002-7863. PMID 20055389.
- Harman, W. Hill; Harris, T. David; Freedman, Danna E.; Fong, Henry; Chang, Alicia; Rinehart, Jeffrey D.; Ozarowski, Andrew; Sougrati, Moulay T.; Grandjean, Fernande; Long, Gary J.; Long, Jeffrey R. (2010). "Slow Magnetic Relaxation in a Family of Trigonal Pyramidal Iron(II) Pyrrolide Complexes". Journal of the American Chemical Society. 132 (51): 18115–18126. Bibcode:2010JAChS.13218115H. doi:10.1021/ja105291x. ISSN 0002-7863. PMID 21141856.
- Freedman, Danna E.; Jenkins, David M.; Iavarone, Anthony T.; Long, Jeffrey R. (2008). "A Redox-Switchable Single-Molecule Magnet Incorporating [Re(CN)7]3-". Journal of the American Chemical Society. 130 (10): 2884–2885. Bibcode:2008JAChS.130.2884F. doi:10.1021/ja077527x. ISSN 0002-7863. PMID 18271583.
