= Athena Kourtis =

Medical Academic and Public Official

Athena P. Kourtis
- Born: Greece

Academic background
- Education: MD, National and Kapodistrian University of Athens; PhD, Pasteur Institute; MPH, Johns Hopkins Bloomberg School of Public Health

Academic work
- Institutions: Centers for Disease Control and Prevention; Emory University

Athena Kourtis is a Greek-American pediatrician, infectious diseases physician, scientist and author. She is the Centers for Disease Control and Prevention Chief of HIV Research, as well as a Professor of Pediatrics at Emory University School of Medicine and a Professor of Obstetrics/Gynecology at Eastern Virginia Medical School. Her research work has focused on perinatal, maternal and pediatric infections, and she is a leading expert in pediatric HIV, Cytomegalovirus, and Hepatitis, as well as infections in pregnancy. In Greece, she is recognized as a prominent medical expert and media voice for her contributions to public health and infectious disease research, as well as for her authorship of the children's health book Βγάλτε τα Παιδιά από τη Γυάλα.

== Early life and education ==
Kourtis was raised in Greece, earning her medical degree Magna Cum Laude from the National and Kapodistrian University of Athens, and her PhD in Immunology at the Pasteur Institute and the National University of Athens School of Medicine. She obtained a Master's in Public Health from the Johns Hopkins Bloomberg School of Public Health.

== Career ==
Upon completing her medical degree, Kourtis started a residency followed by a fellowship in Pediatrics at Johns Hopkins School of Medicine and a fellowship in Pediatric Infectious Diseases, Epidemiology and Immunology at the Emory University School of Medicine. She then joined the faculty at the Department of Pediatrics at Emory University.

Her early research focused on the role of the thymus in immunologic depletion of children with HIV. Her research work helped determine the time of transmission of HIV to the baby during pregnancy and delivery. For this work, she won the Lysidi Award from the Hellenic National Academy of Sciences. She also won the Vector Laboratories Young Investigator Award from the American Society for Microbiology.

After joining the Centers for Disease Control and Prevention, she led a research team conducting a number of pivotal clinical trials in the U.S. and overseas. The work included research that led to prevention of HIV transmission from breastfeeding. Moreover, her research helped achieve elimination of perinatal HIV infections in the United States. She has also worked on emerging infections such as the Ebola virus, the Zika virus, COVID-19 and Mpox, as well as other public health crises such as antibiotic resistance. For her contributions, she has received the Outstanding Scientific Achievement Award from the Federal Executive Board and the Centers for Disease Control and Prevention Charles C. Shepard Award.

Kourtis works on the national Clinical Practice Guideline committees including the Committee of Infectious Diseases of the American Academy of Pediatrics and the Department of Health and Human Services Panel. She has been the editor of the Clinics in Perinatology, and the editor of the book HIV-1 and Breastfeeding: Science, Research Advances, and Policy. She has authored more than 250 peer-reviewed publications in the academic literature with over 15,000 total citations. Kourtis is also the author of a book for parents entitled Keeping Your Children Healthy in a Germ-Filled World, published by the Johns Hopkins University Press. Kourtis is one of the main contributors to the Red Book, published by the American Academy of Pediatrics.
