= Bediako =

Bediako is both a surname and a given name. Notable people with the name include:

- Bediako Asare (born 1930), Ghanaian journalist and writer
- Kwabena Bediako (born 1986), African-American chemist
- Kwame Bediako (1945–2008), Ghanaian theologian
