= Plastic magnet =

Object which is made of plastic and has magnetic properties

A plastic magnet is a non-metallic magnet made from an organic polymer.

Plastic magnets could be used in computer hardware such as disc drives, as well as in medical devices such as pacemakers and cochlear implants, where the organic material is more likely to be biocompatible than its metallic counterparts.

== Examples ==
=== PANiCNQ ===
PANiCNQ is plastic magnet made of a combination of emeraldine-based polyaniline (PANi), and tetracyanoquinodimethane (TCNQ). It was created in 2004 at the University of Durham by Pakistan born scientist Naveed A. Zaidi and colleagues, and it was the first magnetic polymer to function at room temperature. PANi is a conductive polymer that is stable in air. When combined with the free radical-forming TCNQ as an acceptor molecule, it can mimic the mechanism of metallic magnets. The magnetic properties arise from the fully pi-conjugated nitrogen-containing backbone combined with molecular charge transfer side groups. These properties cause the molecule to have a high density of localized spins that can give rise to coupling of their magnetic fields. When this polymer magnet is synthesized, the polymer chains need 3 months to line up before displaying any notable magnetism.

=== Light-tunable magnet ===
In February 2002, researchers from Ohio State University & University of Utah developed the world's first light-tunable plastic magnet. The plastic material became 1.5 times more magnetic when blue light was shined on it. Green laser light reversed the effect somewhat by decreasing the material's magnetism to 60 percent of its normal level. The plastic magnet was made from a polymer made of tetracyanoethylene (TCNE) combined with manganese (Mn) ions – atoms of the metal manganese with electrons removed. The magnet functioned up to a temperature of 75 K (−198 °C; −325 °F).

== See also ==
- Molecular magnet (disambiguation)

== Works cited ==
- Matthew Killeya (30 August 2004). "First practical plastic magnets created". New Scientist.
- Dušan A. Pejaković; Chitoshi Kitamura; Joel S. Miller; Arthur J. Epstein (2002). "Photoinduced Magnetization in the Organic-Based Magnet Mn(TCNE)_{x}•y(CH_{2}Cl_{2})". Physical Review Letters. 88 (5) 057202. Bibcode:2002PhRvL..88e7202P. doi:10.1103/PhysRevLett.88.057202. PMID 11863772.
