= Xanthou =

Xanthou is a Greek surname. Notable people with the surname include:

- Georgina Xanthou (fl. 2003), immunologist
- Niki Xanthou (born 1973), Greek long jumper
