= Jeffrey R. Long =

American inorganic chemist

- Born: Jeffrey Robert Long; May 15, 1969 (age 57); Rolla, Missouri, U.S.
- Education: Cornell University (BA) Harvard University (PhD)
- Scientific career
- Fields: Inorganic chemistry, materials chemistry, single-molecule magnets, metal-organic frameworks
- Workplaces: University of California, Berkeley; Materials Science Division, Lawrence Berkeley National Laboratory
- Thesis: Extended solid frameworks and their molecular cluster derivatives (1995)
- Doctoral advisor: Richard H. Holm
- Other academic advisors: Roald Hoffmann; Paul Alivisatos
- Doctoral students: Hemamala Karunadasa; Danna Freedman; Mircea Dincă; Louise Berben; Eric Tulsky
- Other notable students: Jenny Y. Yang
- Website: alchemy.cchem.berkeley.edu/home/

Jeffrey Robert Long is an American chemist who is currently the C. Judson King Distinguished Professor at the University of California, Berkeley, and the Director of the Baker Hughes Institute for Decarbonization Materials. Broadly, Long's research group at Berkeley is centered on controlling chemical structure and function through molecular design. Long has contributed significant advances in the areas of chemistry, chemical engineering, materials science, and physics. More specifically, he is known for adsorbent materials for capturing and storing CO_{2}, O_{2}, and H_{2}. He has contributed to the area of molecular quantum magnetism. In 2026, he was elected to the American Philosophical Society.

== Early life and education ==
Long was born on May 15, 1969, and grew up in Rolla, Missouri. Long's father is Gary J. Long, Prof. Emeritus of Chemistry at the Missouri University of Science and Technology, who is a pioneer in studying iron-containing molecules and solids using Mössbauer spectroscopy.

Long attended Cornell University for his undergraduate studies, where he majored in chemistry and mathematics and graduated summa cum laude and cum laude, respectively. At Cornell, Long carried out research with Nobel Laureate and poet Prof. Roald Hoffman, using principles of molecular orbital theory to determine the solid-state band structure of metal carbides. For his course work and research at Cornell, Long was awarded the Mandelkern Prize in 1991.

After graduating from Cornell, Long moved to Harvard University as an Office of Naval Research Predoctoral Fellow, where he carried out his doctoral research in the laboratory of Prof. Richard H. Holm. At Harvard, Long's work focused on the study of inorganic-solid frameworks and developed theoretical and experimental routes to decrease the dimensionality of these frameworks from three to two-dimensional sheets, to one-dimensional chains, to zero-dimensional molecular clusters. This general approach, coined by Long as “dimensional reduction”, has enabled new and reliable solution-based synthetic routes to cluster-based molecules and materials. For this work, Long received a Ph.D. in Chemistry From Harvard in 1995.

After continuing with Holm for a brief postdoctoral study at Harvard, Long moved to the University of California, Berkeley, where he carried out postdoctoral research in the laboratory of Prof. A. Paul Alivisatos as a National Science Foundation Postdoctoral Research Fellow.

== Independent career ==
Long began his independent career at the University of California, Berkeley in 1997, where he expanded his work to include studies on Prussian blue analogs and metal cyanide coordination clusters with an emphasis on their magnetic properties. He has contributed significantly to the field of molecular magnetism, most notably in the synthesis and characterization of a linear cobalt(II) complex exhibiting a non-Aufbau ground state, the characterization of radical-bridged lanthanide single-molecule magnets (SMMs), and the isolation of atomically defined 2-D metal-halide sheets within a porous material. In the mid-2000s the focus of his research shifted towards the emergent field of metal–organic frameworks (MOFs). His initial studies were focused on hydrogen storage in open-metal site manganese MOFs. His other notable works in this field include the synthesis and characterization of novel frameworks for hydrocarbon separations, the discovery of a novel cooperative mechanism for carbon dioxide capture, as well as the discovery of materials for other industrially relevant chemical separations. He has published over 400 scientific papers during his independent career, with over 100,000 citations and an h-index of 145. In addition, he has filed over 20 patents stemming from technology developed within his laboratory. Long will be moving to the Department of Chemistry and Chemical Biology at Harvard University on January 1st, 2027.

== Recognition ==
Long is a member of the National Academy of Sciences and the American Academy of Arts and Sciences.
