= Zoe Pikramenou =

Inorganic chemist and researcher

- Education: National and Kapodistrian University of Athens B.Sc. (1987); Michigan State University Ph.D. (1993)
- Scientific career
- Fields: Nanotechnology Inorganic chemistry Photophysics
- Workplaces: University of Birmingham
- Doctoral advisor: Daniel G. Nocera
- Other academic advisors: Jean Marie Lehn
- Website: www.birmingham.ac.uk/staff/profiles/chemistry/pikramenou-zoe.aspx

Zoe Pikramenou is a British chemist. She is Professor of Inorganic Chemistry and Photophysics at the University of Birmingham, where she is the first female professor in the chemistry department.

== Education and career ==
Pikramenou graduated in 1987 with a B.Sc. in chemistry from the University of Athens in Greece. She then moved to Michigan State University where she worked in the lab of Daniel G. Nocera, graduating with a Ph.D. in chemistry in 1993. She then conducted post-doctoral studies at University of Strasbourg in France as a Marie Curie and Collège de France fellow working with Nobel prize-winner Jean-Marie Lehn. She became a lecturer at the University of Edinburgh in 1995, then was appointed to the University of Birmingham in 2000.

== Research ==
Platelet actin nodules are podosome-like structures.

Pikramenou is an inorganic chemist with experience in nanotechnology and photophysics, who has researched lanthanide luminescent complexes. Recent research has investigated how gold nanorods could be applied to treat cancerous cells in the body. This research is in partnership with the Canadian company Sona Nanotech Inc. Pikramenou has researched other applications of gold nanoparticles, including their use in tracking blood flow in capillary networks. She was part of a team that developed iridium-coated gold nanoparticles, significant because they have a longer lifetime of use. She has co-investigated platelet nodules, using microscopy.

Another medical application of Pikramenou's nanoparticle research includes the application of coated silica particles to treat sensitive teeth. As part of her doctoral research at Michigan State University, Pikramenou invented a nanoparticle bucket, which lights up when in contains a particular compound. This kind of microscopic bucket is described as a supramolecule.

=== Coated nanoparticles patent ===
In 2017, Pikramenou and her co-researcher Nicola J Rogers, were granted a patent to protect their invention of a new process of combining at least one metal complex and a surfactant.

== Awards ==
- 2012 - Leverhulme Trust Research Fellowship
- 2007 - EPSRC Discipline Hopping Award with Chemical Engineering
- 2000 - The Aventis Scientia Europea Prize, Aventis Foundation and French Academy of Sciences for collaborative work with Physicist and Biologist
