= Nikos Sypsas =

Greek academic and medical doctor

- Νίκος Σύψας
- Education: Kapodistrian University of Athens
- Occupation: Professor of Medicine (Infectious Diseases)

Nikos Sypsas is a Greek academic and medical doctor specialized in infectious diseases from Nafpaktia, Greece. He is primarily known for his participation in the scientific committee of the Greek government for the coronavirus pandemic from 2019 to 2020. He has authored and co-authored numerous papers for scientific journals and has an H-index of 32.

== Biography ==
Sypsas is a professor of infectious diseases at the Medical School of the University of Athens.

He earned his M.D. at the University of Athens. He completed his post-doctoral thesis in History of Medicine at the Medical School of the University of Zurich in Switzerland and was trained in Internal Medicine at Athens Naval Hospital and Athens Laiko General Hospital. Sipsas has also served as a research fellow in Infectious Diseases at Massachusetts General Hospital in Boston. He currently practices medicine in the Infectious Disease Unit of the Clinical Pathology department at Laiko General Hospital in Athens, Greece.

== Personal life ==
Sypsas is married to a medical doctor who also works at Laiko General and has a son and two daughters, one of whom is a medical doctor specialized in radiology.
