= National and Kapodistrian University of Athens =

Public university in Athens, Greece

- Εθνικό και Καποδιστριακό Πανεπιστήμιο Αθηνών
- Latin: Universitas Atheniensis
- Type: Public higher education institution
- Established: May 3, 1837; 189 years ago
- Rector: Gerasimos Siasos
- Faculty: 1,790
- Administrative staff: 1,021
- Students: 66,871
- Undergraduates: 41,454
- Postgraduates: 25,417 (including doctoral candidates)
- Location: Athens, Greece; 37°58′09″N 23°46′51″E Building details
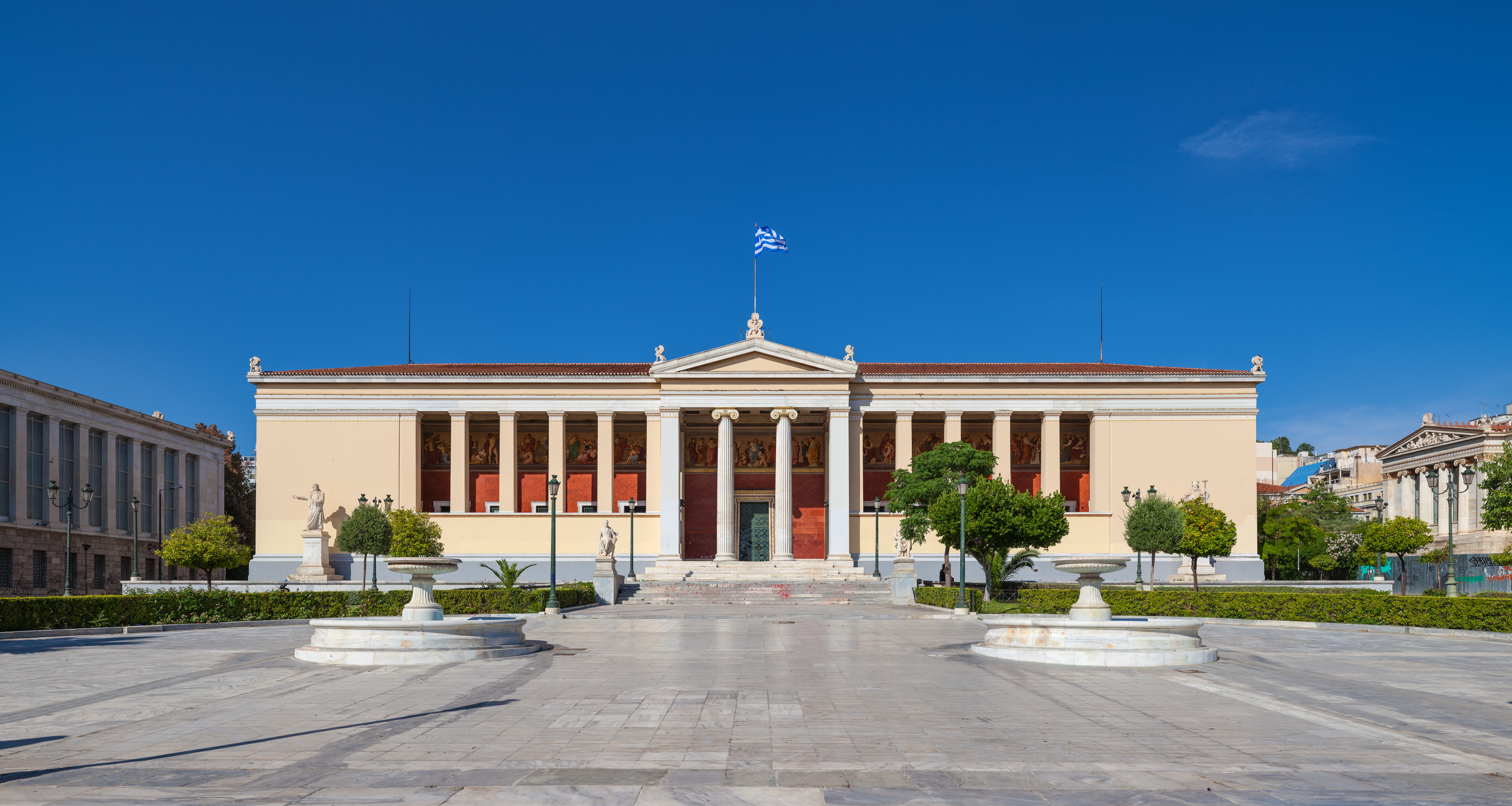
- The 19th-century University of Athens historic building designed by Christian Hansen, as seen in 2014. It was once the only University building but now serves as a ceremony hall and rectory
- Campus: Urban, suburban
- Newspaper: The University of Athens
- Colours: Blue and White
- Website: en.uoa.gr

The National and Kapodistrian University of Athens (NKUA; Greek: Εθνικό και Καποδιστριακό Πανεπιστήμιο Αθηνών, Ethnikó kai Kapodistriakó Panepistímio Athinón), simply referred to as the University of Athens (UoA), is a public university in Athens, Greece, with various campuses along the Athens agglomeration.

It has been in continuous operation since its establishment in 1837 and is the oldest higher education institution of the modern Greek state and the first contemporary university in both the Balkan Peninsula and the Eastern Mediterranean. Today it is one of the largest universities by enrollment in Europe, with over 69,000 registered students.

== History ==
=== Founding and expansion ===
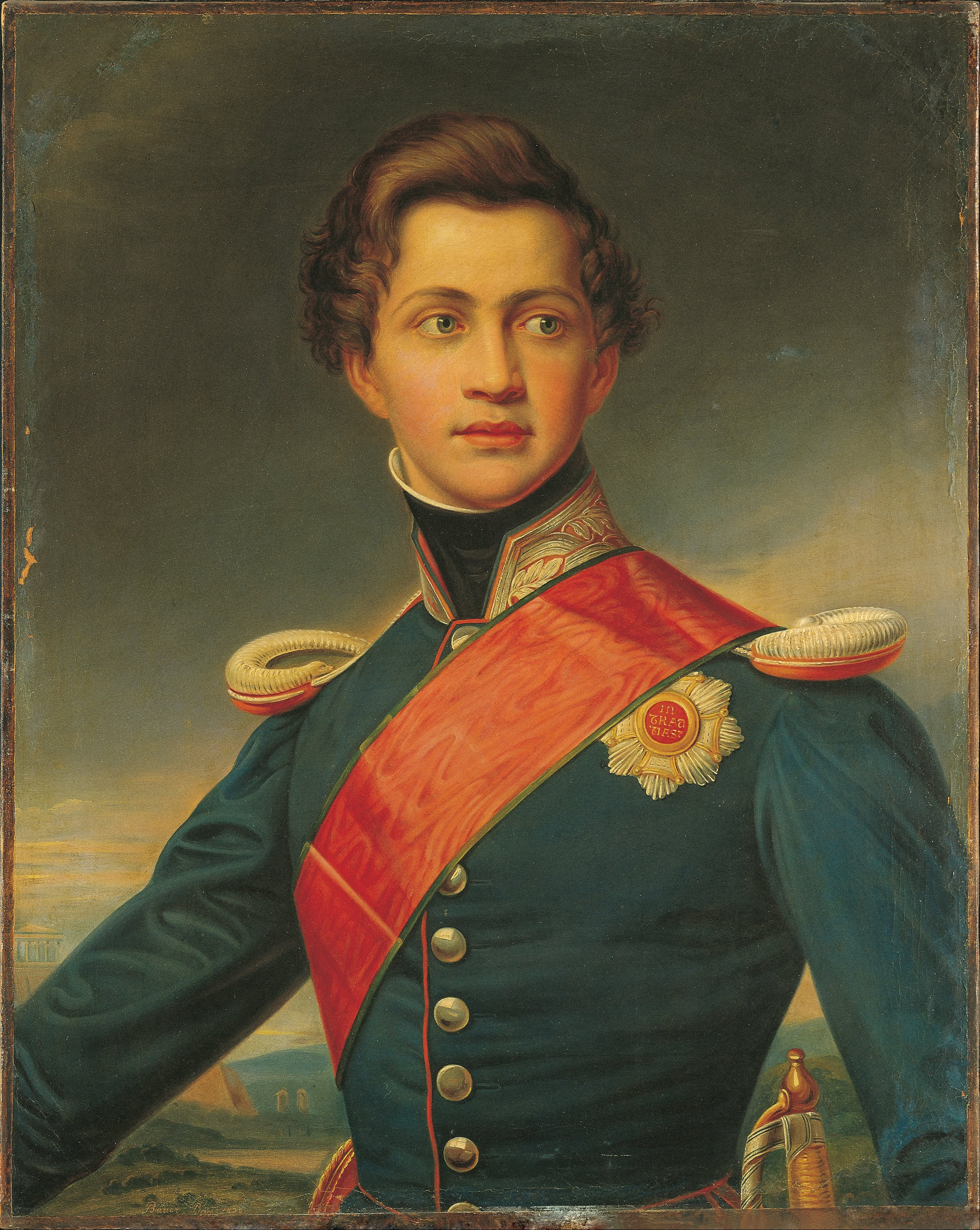
King Otto of Greece was the founder of the University of Athens.

The University of Athens was founded on 3 May 1837 by King Otto of Greece (in Greek, Óthon) and was named in his honour Othonian University (Οθώνειον Πανεπιστήμιον). It was the first university in the liberated Greek state and in the surrounding area of Southeast Europe as well. It was also the second academic institution after the Ionian Academy. This fledgling university consisted of four faculties; Theology, Law, Medicine, and Arts (which included applied sciences and mathematics). During its first year of operation, the institution was staffed by 33 professors, while courses were attended by 52 students and 75 non-matriculated "auditors".

It was first housed in the residence of architects Stamatios Kleanthis and Eduard Schaubert, on the north slope of the Acropolis, in Plaka, which now houses the Athens University History Museum. In November 1841, the university relocated to the Main Building of the University of Athens, a building designed by Danish architect Christian Hansen. He followed a neoclassical approach, "combining the monument's magnificence with a human scale simplicity" and gave the building its H-shape. The building was decorated by painter Carl Rahl, forming the famous "architectural trilogy of Athens", together with the building of the National Library of Greece (left of the university) and the building of the Athens Academy (right of the university). Construction began in 1839 in a location to the north of the Acropolis. Its front wing, also known as the Propylaea, was completed in 1842–1843. The rest of the wings' construction, that was supervised at first by Greek architect Lysandros Kaftanzoglou and later by his colleague Anastasios Theofilas, was completed in 1864. The building is nowadays part of what is called the "Athenian Neoclassical Trilogy".

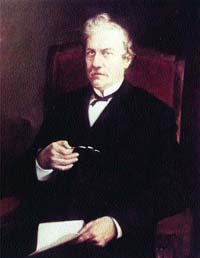
The historian and professor Konstantinos Paparrigopoulos, founder of the modern Greek historiography, was elected Rector of the University of Athens in 1872.

The Othonian University was renamed to National University (Εθνικόν Πανεπιστήμιον) in 1862, following events that forced King Otto to leave the country.

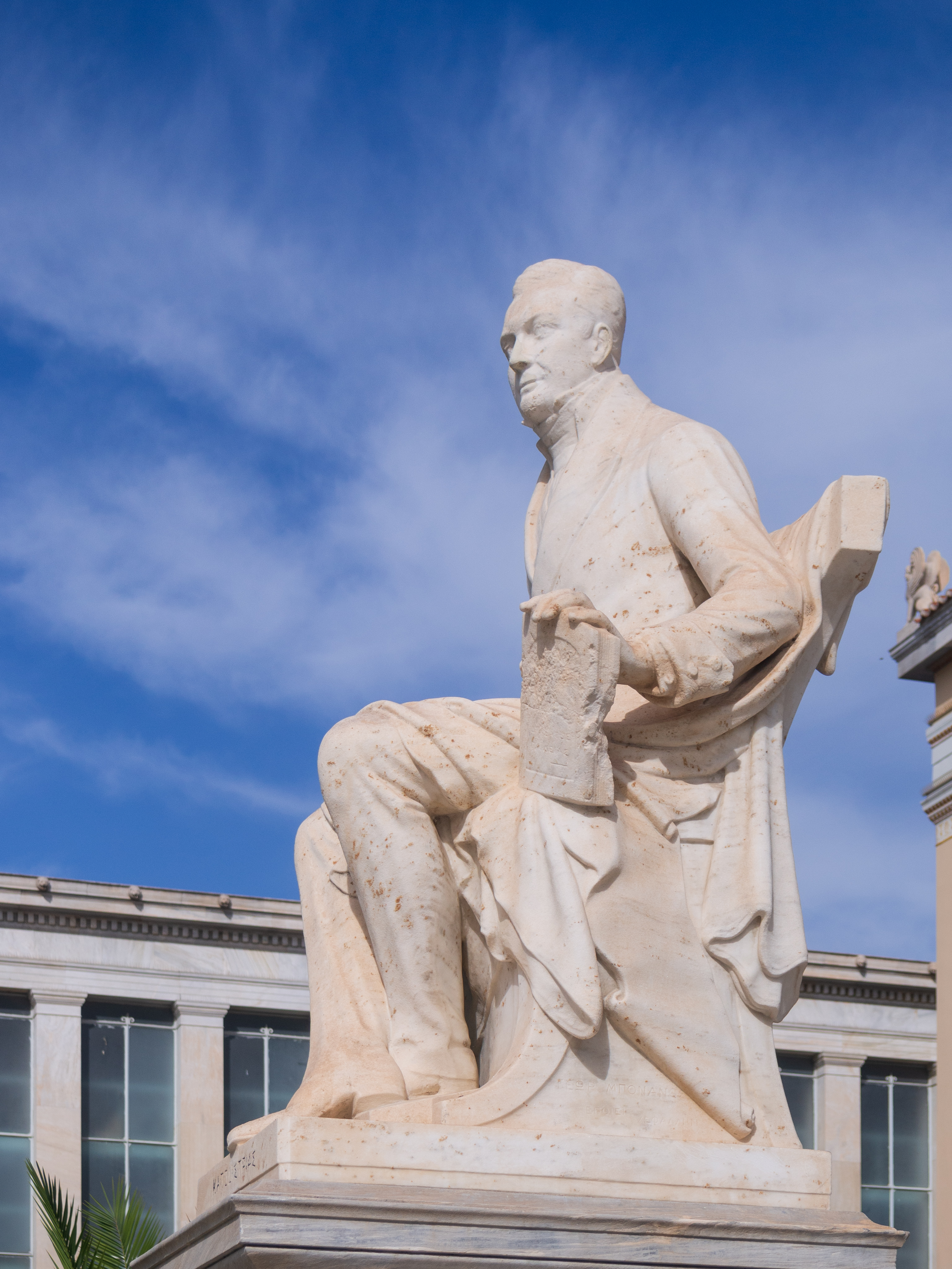
Statue of the first governor of Greece, Conte Ioannis Kapodistrias, whose name has been given to the university in 1932, after the unification of the Kapodistrian University (theoretical schools) and the National University (scientific schools).

A major change in the structure of the university came about in 1904, when the faculty of Arts was divided into two separate faculties: that of Arts (Σχολή Τεχνών) and that of Sciences (Σχολή Επιστημών), the latter consisting of the departments of Physics and Mathematics and the School of Pharmacy. In 1919, a department of chemistry was added, and in 1922 the School of Pharmacy was renamed a department. A further change came about when the School of Dentistry was added to the faculty of Medicine.

Between 1895 and 1911, an average of 1,000 new students matriculated each year, a number which increased to 2,000 at the end of World War I. This resulted in the decision to introduce entrance examinations for all the faculties, beginning from the academic year 1927–28. Since 1954 the number of students admitted each year has been fixed by the Ministry of Education and Religious Affairs, by proposal of the faculties.

=== Modern history ===
The University Club building was founded in 1930. Today the building houses the Health Services Office, the Meals Department, the University Club reading rooms, and the Students Cultural Association (POFPA).

From 1911 until 1932 the university was separated into the Kapodistrian University (the humanities departments; named after Ioannis Kapodistrias, the first head of state of the independent modern Greek state) and the National University (the science departments). In 1932, the two separate legal entities were merged into the "National and Kapodistrian University of Athens."

During the 1960s, construction work began on the University Campus in the suburb of Ilissia, which houses the Schools of Philosophy, Theology, and Sciences.

In 2013, the University Senate made the decision to suspend all operations in the wake of the Ministry of Education and Religious Affairs cutting 1,655 administrative jobs from universities around the country. In a statement, the University Senate said that "any educational, research, and administrative operation of the University of Athens is objectively impossible".

== Schools and Departments ==
The University of Athens is divided into Schools and Departments as follows. The naming is nοt consistent in English for historical reasons, but in Greek the largest divisions are generally named "Σχολές" (Schools) and are divided in "Τμήματα" (Departments), furthermore subdivided in "Τομείς" (Sections).

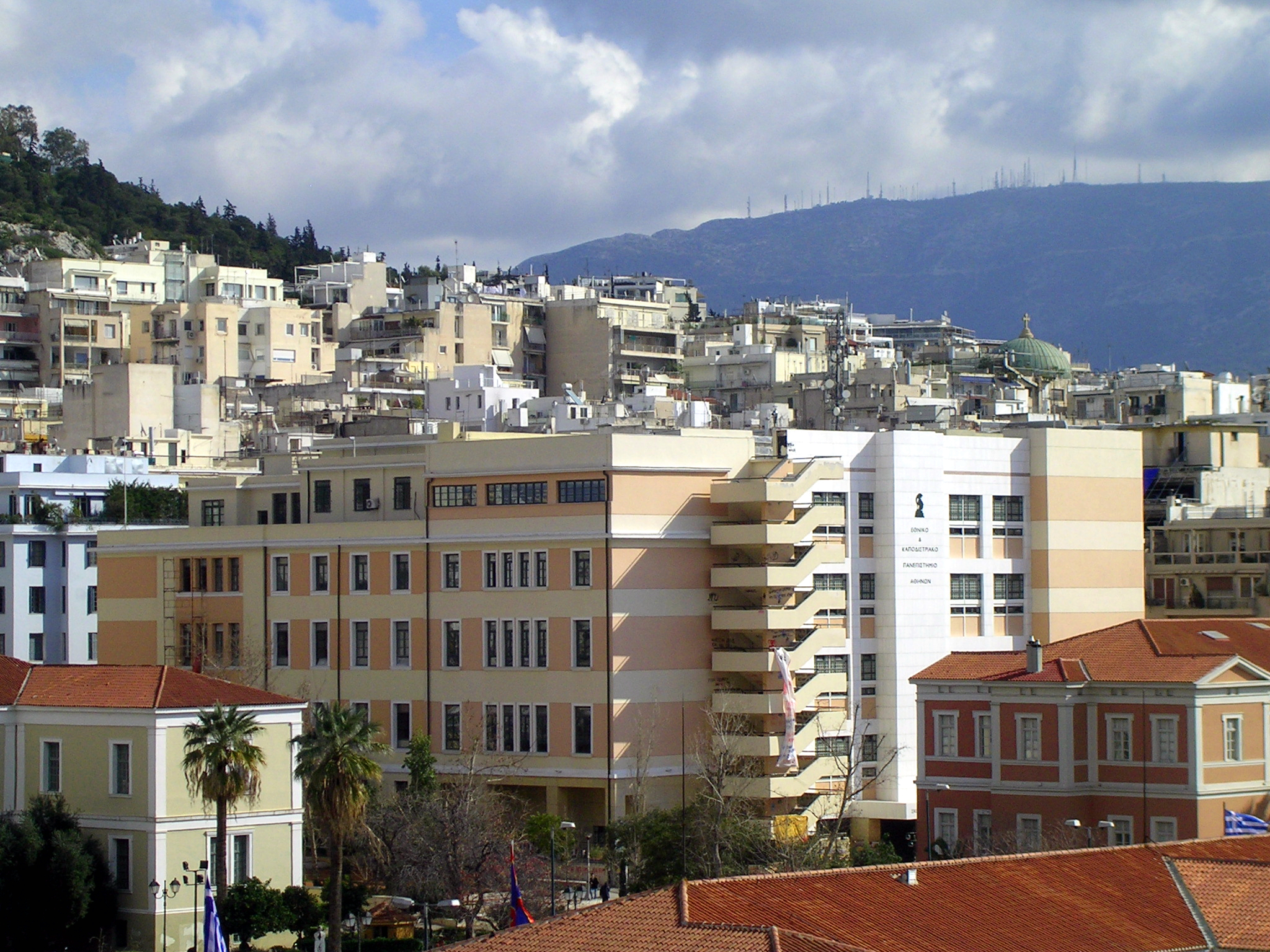
The School of Law. The building was initially built about 1930. A second branch was added in the 1960s. Extensive renovation began in 2002 and was completed by 2006.

The University of Athens also offers an English-taught 4-year undergraduate programme (with tuition) in Archaeology, History, and Literature of Ancient Greece.

Schools	Departments
School of Agricultural Development, Nutrition and Sustainability (founded 2019)	Department of Agricultural Development, Agrofood and Management of Natural Resources (founded 2019)
School of Education (founded 2013)	Department of Primary Education (founded 1984); Department of Early Childhood Education (founded 1987)
School of Health Sciences (founded 2013)	Department of Medicine (founded 1837); Department of Nursing (founded 1980); Department of Dentistry (founded 1911); Department of Pharmacy (founded 1843)
School of Physical Education and Sport Science (founded 1983)	Department of Physical Education and Sport Science (founded 1983)
School of Theology (founded 1837)	Department of Theology (founded 1837); Department of Social Theology and Religious Studies (founded 1974)
School of Science (founded 1904)	Department of Mathematics (founded 1982); Department of Physics (founded 1982); Department of Informatics and Telecommunications (founded 1989); Department of Chemistry (founded 1918); Department of Biology (founded 1970); Department of Geology and Geoenvironment (founded 1970); Department of Digital Industry Technologies (founded 2019); Department of Aerospace Science and Technology (founded 2019); Department of History and Philosophy of Science (founded 1993)
School of Law (founded 1838)	Department of Law (founded 1838)
School of Economics and Political Sciences (founded 2013)	Department of Economics (founded 1981); Department of Business Administration (founded 2019); Department of Political Science and Public Administration (founded 1982); Department of Sociology (founded 2019); Department of Communication and Media Studies (founded 1990); Department of Turkish Studies and Modern Asian Studies (founded 2003); Department of Ports Management and Shipping (founded 2019); Department of Digital Arts and Cinema (founded 2019)
School of Philosophy (founded 1837)	Department of Philology (founded 1984); Department of History and Archaeology (founded 1984); Department of Educational Studies (founded 2019) [progression of the Department of Pedagogy of the Faculty of Philosophy - Pedagogy and Psychology, (founded 1984)]; Department of Philosophy (founded 2019) [progression of the Department of Philosophy of the Faculty of Philosophy - Pedagogy and Psychology, (founded 1984)]; Department of Psychology (founded 2013) [progression of the Program of Psychology (founded 1993)]; Department of English Language and Literature (founded 1951); Department of French Language and Literature (founded 1954); Department of German Language and Literature (founded 1977); Department of Italian Language and Literature (founded 2010); Department of Spanish Language and Literature (founded 2010); Department of Russian Language and Literature and Slavic Studies (founded 2008); Department of Theatre Studies (founded 1990); Department of Music Studies (founded 1991); Department of Philosophy - Pedagogy and Psychology (founded 1984) [in transition mode]

== Academic evaluation ==
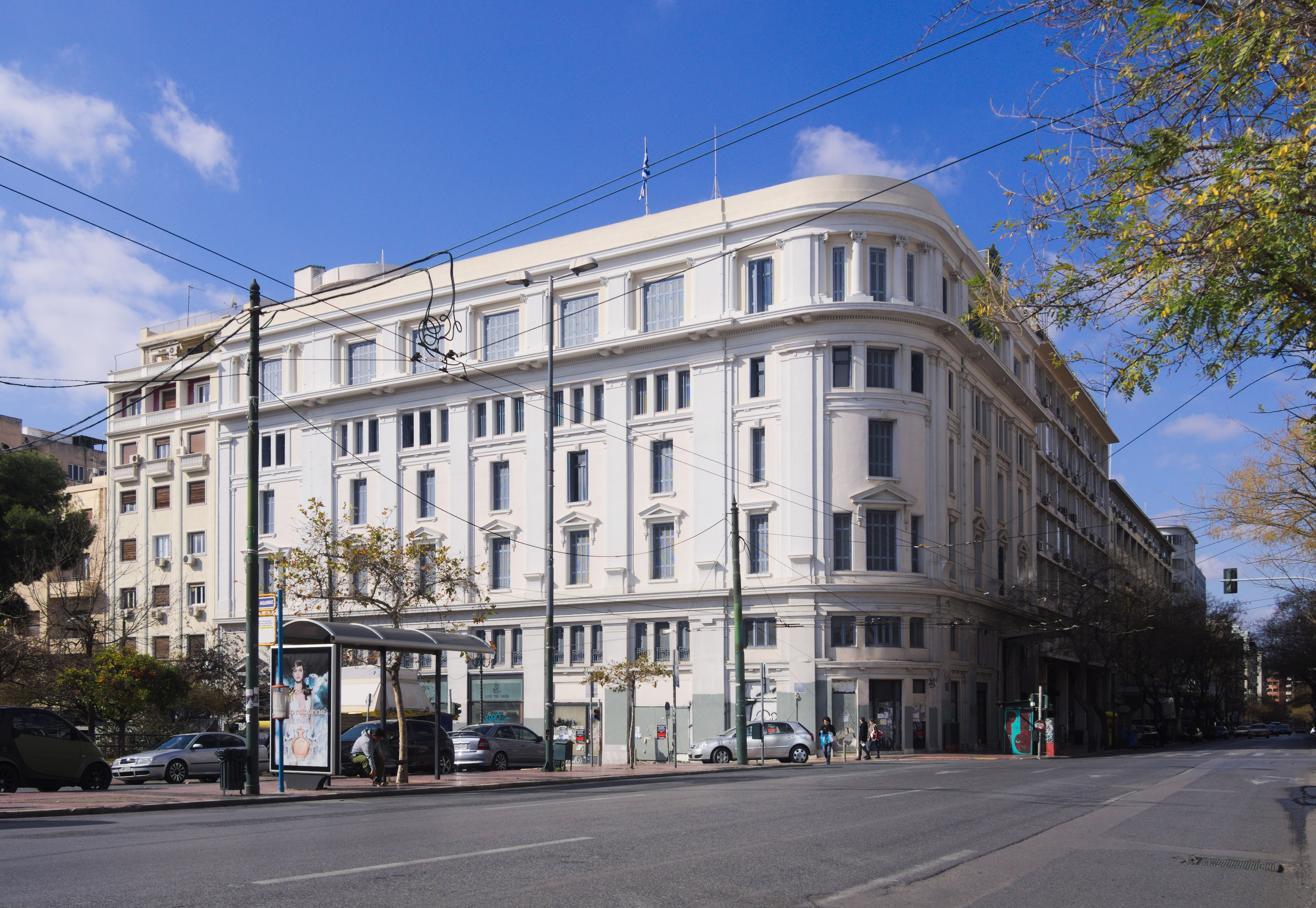
The University Club building, founded in 1930. The building houses the Health Services Office, the Meals Department, the University Club reading rooms, and the Students Cultural Association (POFPA).

In 2024, the external evaluation of the institution cited University of Athens with distinction. An external evaluation of all academic departments in Greek universities was conducted by the Hellenic Quality Assurance and Accreditation Agency (HQA) in 2010–14.

== Rankings ==
University rankings

The University of Athens is considered one of the leading universities of Greece, a leading European regional university and is present in the top universities annual lists.

U.S. News & World Report Media Company has recently published the results of its Best Global Universities Rankings for 2025–2026. In this 11th consecutive annual edition of the US News Best Global Universities Rankings, the National and Kapodistrian University of Athens placed 1st among Greek and Cypriot Universities and 216th worldwide. In Europe, the University of Athens secured 78th place, up from 82nd last year. In addition, NKUA achieved significant distinctions in many subject areas in the 2025–2026 rankings, including the following:

1. Cardiac and Cardiovascular Systems (#38),

2. Infectious Diseases (#65),

3. Gastroenterology and Hepatology (#52),

4. Clinical Medicine (#94), and

5. Public, Environmental, and Occupational Health (#80).

Also, Times Higher Education released its prestigious THE University Impact Rankings for 2025. Achieving outstanding results across all Sustainable Development Goals (SDGs), the National and Kapodistrian University of Athens placed 1st among the 21 Greek and Cypriot Universities included in this ranking and in the 201–300 bracket globally among 2,536 Institutions evaluated.

Times Higher Education University Impact Rankings assess the position of Universities globally, based on their economic and social impact, as measured against the 17 SDGs of the United Nations. This 7th consecutive annual edition of the THE University Impact Rankings is the largest to date in terms of university participation, including more than 2,526 Institutions from 130 countries and regions. It features 17 tables—one for each of the 17 SDGs—as well as an overall ranking.

According to this ranking, the National and Kapodistrian University of Athens scored exceptionally well and achieved notable distinctions across all 8 SDGs, for which it submitted data.

More specifically, our University ranked:

1. 53rd globally for SDG 5: Gender Equality,
2. 64th globally for SDG 4: Quality Education,
3. 65th globally for SDG 10: Reduced Inequalitie,
4. in the 101–200 bracket globally for SDG 9: Industry, Innovation, and Infrastructure,
5. in the 201–300 bracket globally for SDG 16: Peace, Justice, and Strong Institutions, and
6. in the 301–400 bracket globally for SDG 3: Good Health and Well-being.

With the completion of the first semester of 2025 and the announcement of the results of the Times Higher Education Impact Rankings, the National and Kapodistrian University of Athens records a historic success, as it is now ranked among the top Higher Educational Institutions globally in three international University rankings – with two of them placing it in the top 100 worldwide – for 2024–2025.

Additionally, in the same year, it was awarded a Certificate of Recognition as the ‘Most Improved University in Europe’ by QS Ranking, and thereby expanded its international reach and renown.

Another achievement was the National and Kapodistrian University of Athens global ranking of' 85th among the Top Universities by Top Google Scholar Citations. The National and Kapodistrian University of Athens ranked in the Top 100 of this list, confirming once again its leading position on the global academic stage. This particular result highlights the emphasis the university places on promoting excellence, open access to research, and international collaboration.

The National and Kapodistrian University of Athens climbed up 30 places from last year's rating to 63rd position internationally, out of 24,317 Universities, Research Institutes, and Organizations included in the ranking. In addition, it ranks 15th among European Universities and 1st among Greek and Cypriot Universities for 2024–2025. It has the most scientists among Greek Universities in this ranking (2,287), with 155 of them in the top 3%, 578 in the top 10%, and 1,256 in the top 30% of researchers worldwide.

== Campuses ==
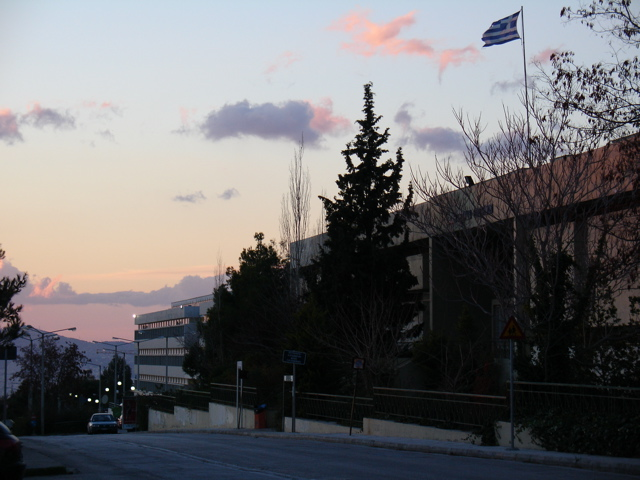
Ano Ilisia University campus

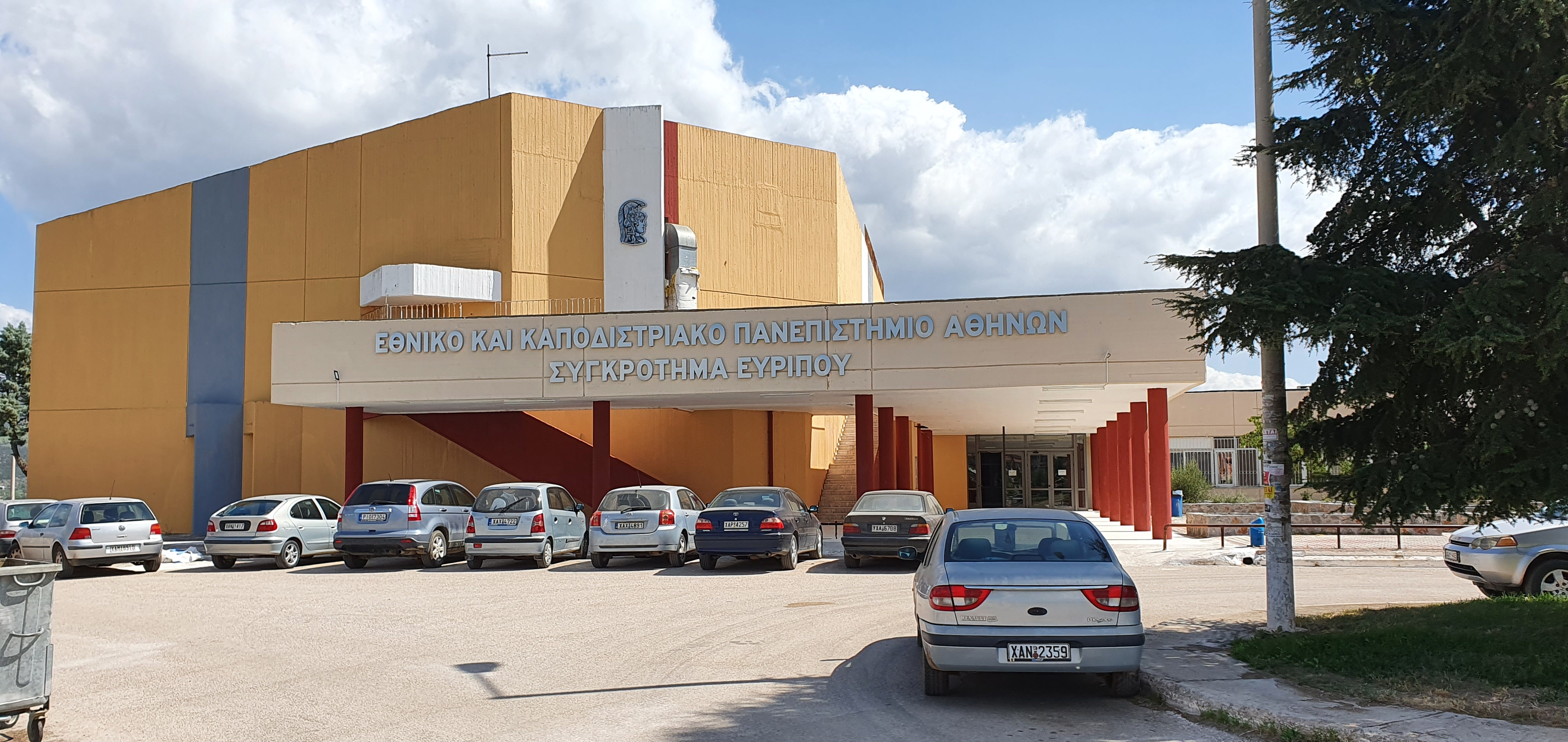
Psachna campus

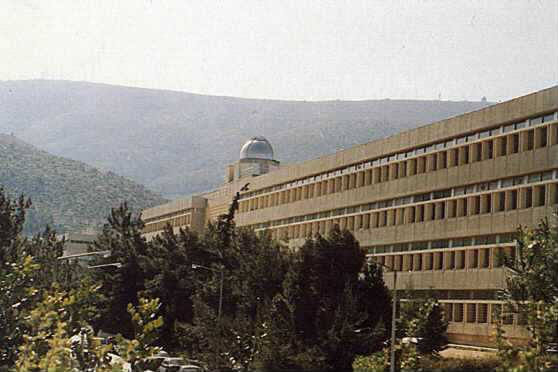
The Physics department building at the Ano Ilisia campus

The main campus is at Ano Ilisia, Zografou. There the Schools of Science, Theology, and Philosophy are situated. The School of Health Sciences is located at Goudi and the School of Physical Education and Sport Science is located at Dafni. The Schools of Education, Economics & Political Sciences, and Law, along with various administrative services are housed in various buildings in the centre of Athens. The School of Agricultural Development, Nutrition and Sustainability, along with two Departments of the School of Science and another two of the School of Economics and Political Sciences operate at the Evripos University Complex in Psachna, Euboea. The university's central administration still continues to operate in the university's main building (the Propylaea) on Panepistimiou St. in Athens city centre.

Campus location	Schools	Departments
Ano Ilisia	School of Theology	
Ano Ilisia	School of Philosophy	
Ano Ilisia	School of Science	
Ano Ilisia		Department of Pharmacy (School of Health Sciences)
Goudi	School of Health Sciences	
Centre of Athens	School of Law	
Centre of Athens	School of Economics and Political Sciences	
Centre of Athens	School of Education	
Dafni	School of Physical Education and Sport Science	
Psachna	School of Agricultural Development, Nutrition and Sustainability	
Psachna		Department of Aerospace Science and Technology (School of Science)
Psachna		Department of Digital Industry Technologies (School of Science)
Psachna		Department of Digital Art and Cinema (School of Economics and Political Sciences)
Psachna		Department of Ports Management and Shipping (School of Economics and Political Sciences)

== Research ==
Research in the University of Athens includes almost all research interests. Such research in the university is associated with that conducted by the hospitals and research institutes of the metropolitan area, including the National Research Center for Physical Sciences "Demokritos", the National Hellenic Research Foundation (EIE), the National Observatory of Athens, the Hellenic Pasteur Institute, the Biomedical Sciences Research Center (BSRC) "Alexander Fleming", the Athens High Performance Computing Laboratory, the National Centre for Marine Research (NCMR) and the Foundation for Biomedical Research of the Academy of Athens (BRFAA).

Research conducted in the institutes of the metropolitan area of Athens accounted for more than 50% of the ISI-indexed scientific publications coming from Greece. The Department of Informatics and Telecommunications has been ranked continuously among the 100 most important research institutes in the field of computer science, according to the Academic Ranking of World Universities (ARWU).

== KEDIVIM ==
The Center for Continuing Education and Lifelong Learning (KEDIVIM; Greek: Κ.Ε.ΔΙ.ΒΙ.Μ. – Κέντρο Επιμόρφωσης και Διά Βίου Μάθησης) of the University of Athens (UoA) is a separate continuing and professional adult educational unit within University of Athens, at "non-typical education", although it is fully or partially regulated by the state and lead to officially recognised qualifications being considered non-formal education (NFE). It offers short-term courses on-campus and by Distance e-Learning Mode off-campus mediated via real-time electronic means, certified by the EOPPEP – National Organization for the Certification of Qualifications and Vocational Guidance (Greek: Εθνικός Οργανισμός Πιστοποίησης Προσόντων και Επαγγελματικού Προσανατολισμού – Ε.Ο.Π.Π.Ε.Π.). In Greece, adult education, continuing education or lifelong learning is offered to students of all adult ages.

== Notable alumni ==
Throughout its history, a sizeable number of University of Athens alumni have become notable in many varied fields, both academic and otherwise. Moreover, two Nobel Prize-winners have studied or taught at Athens, with both their prizes being in Literature.

=== Politics ===
Political leaders who attended the University of Athens

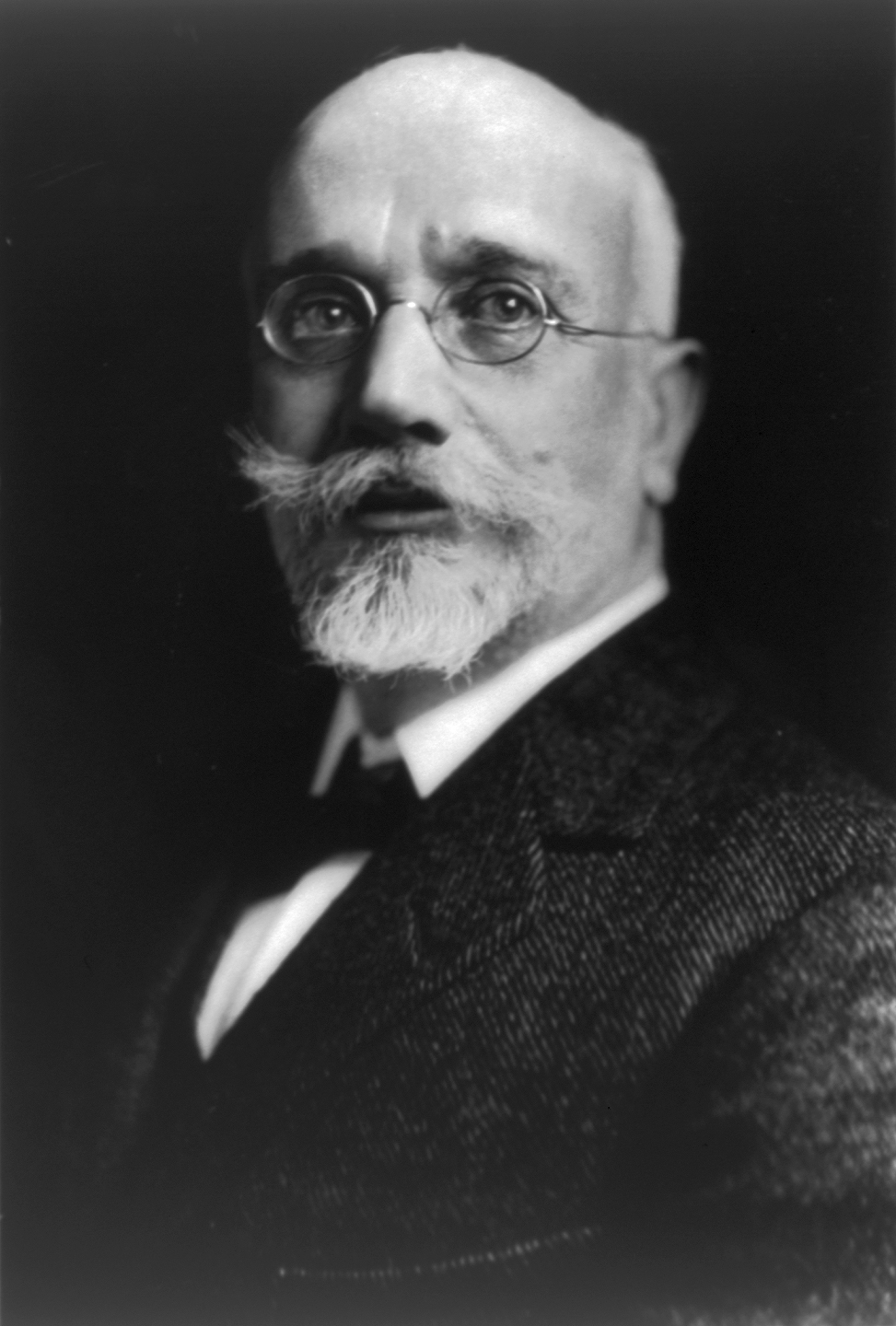
Eleftherios Venizelos

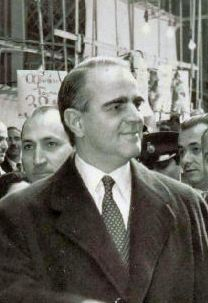
Konstantinos Karamanlis

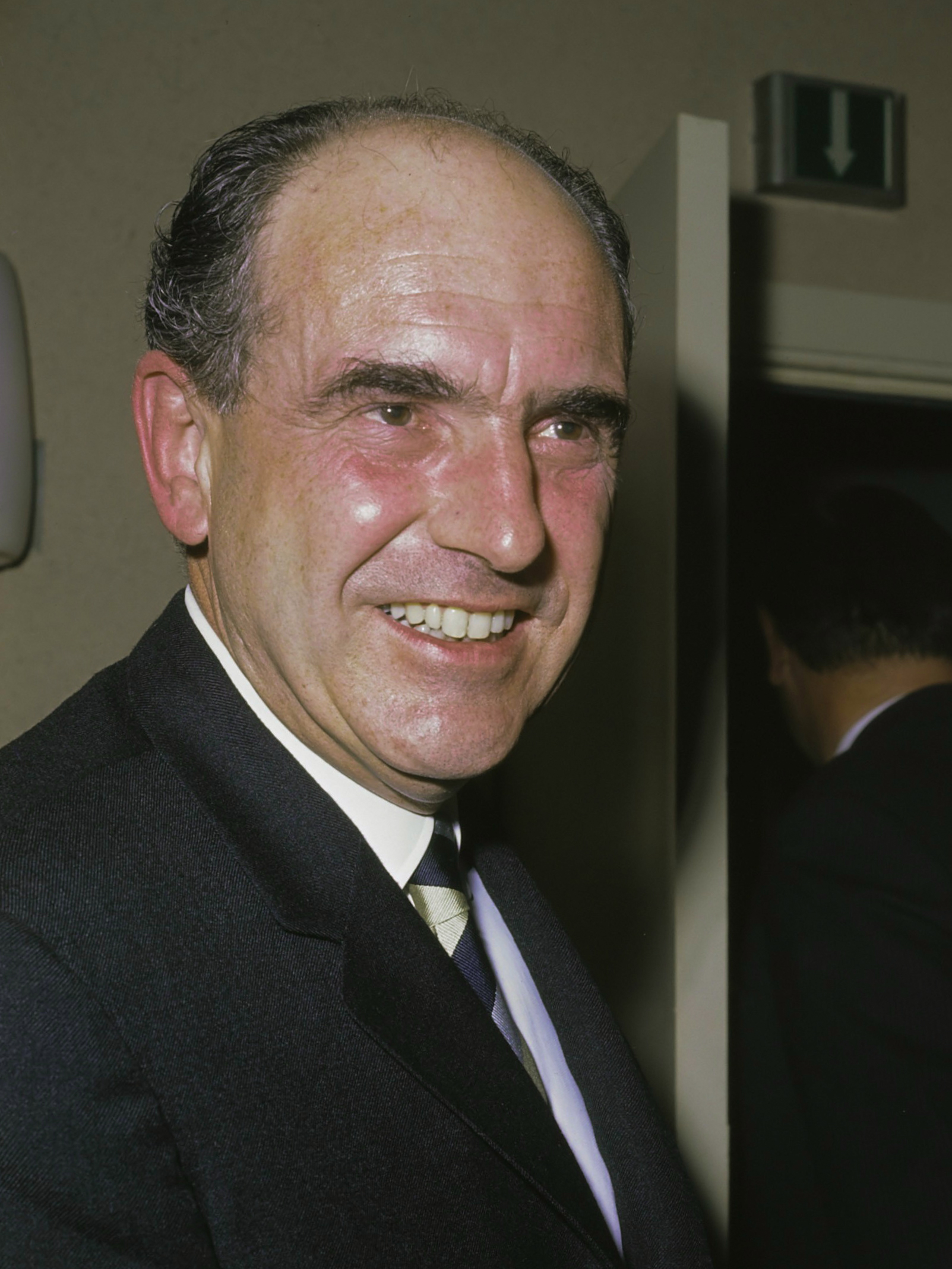
Andreas Papandreou

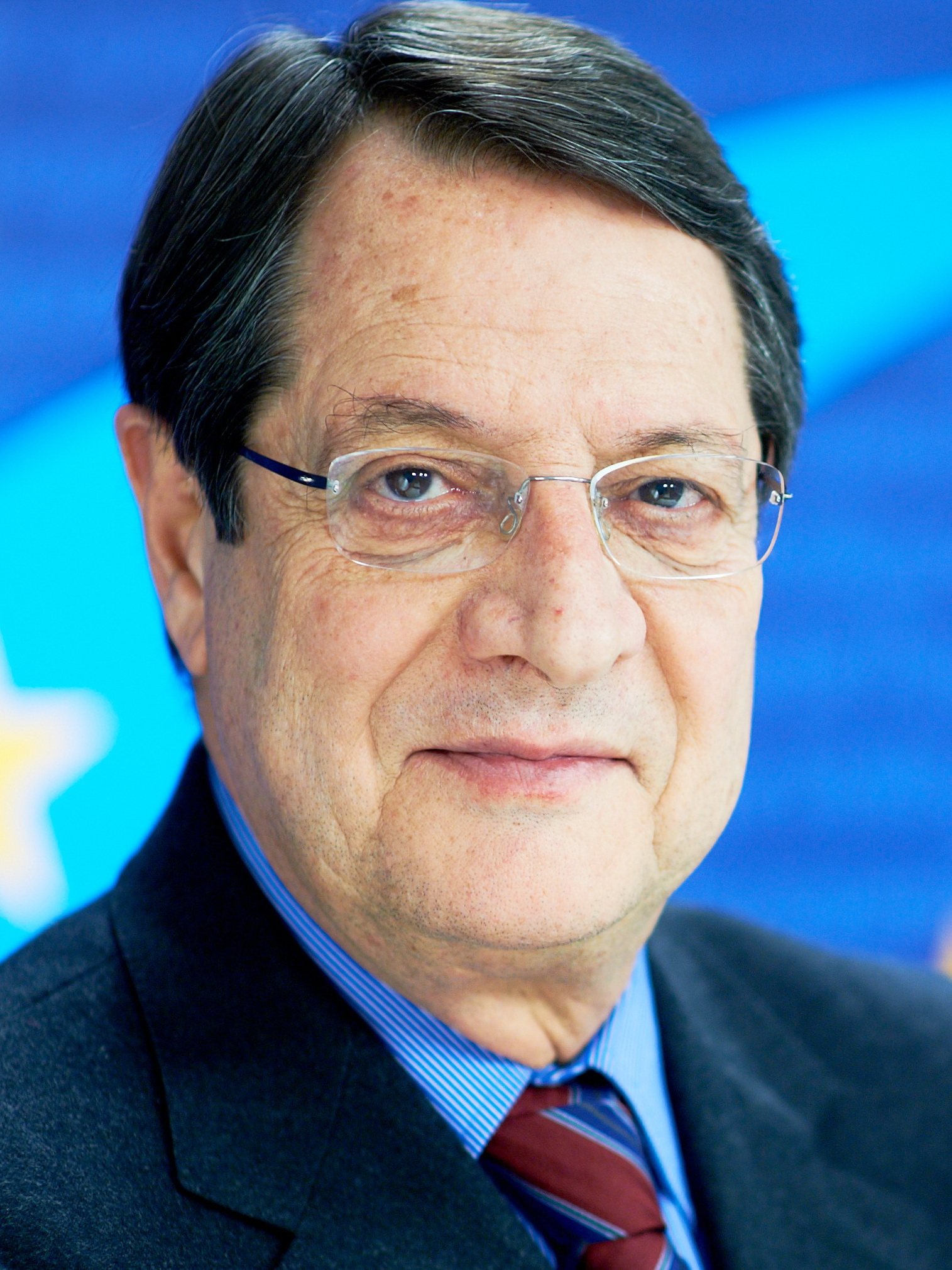
Nicos Anastasiades

Fifteen Greek prime ministers and eight Greek presidents (Konstantinos Karamanlis served as both) have studied at the University of Athens, including Charilaos Trikoupis, Eleftherios Venizelos, Georgios Papandreou, Andreas Papandreou, Konstantinos Karamanlis, Karolos Papoulias, and most recently interim prime minister Vassiliki Thanou-Christophilou. Also, Constantine II, the last monarch of Greece, and Nicos Anastasiades, the former president of Cyprus, attended the university.

The University of Athens has also been home to a large number of other politicians and diplomats, such as Dora Bakoyannis, Kyriakos Mavronikolas, Georgios Alogoskoufis, Fofi Gennimata, Frances Lanitou, and Dimitris Koutsoumpas.

=== Science ===
- Gerasimos Danilatos, physicist, inventor of the ESEM
- Sophia Frangou, psychiatrist
- John P. A. Ioannidis (DSc, 1996 and MD 1990), professor and medical researcher
- Fotis Kafatos, biologist
- Michael N. Katehakis, applied mathematics and operations research
- Athena Kourtis, medical academic, researcher, and CDC official
- Nikos Logothetis, neuroscientist
- Zoi Lygerou, molecular biologist and medical school associate professor
- George Michalopoulos, professor and medical researcher
- Dimitri Nanopoulos, physicist
- Georgios Papanikolaou, doctor, inventor of the Pap test
- Costas Soukoulis, physicist
- Nikos Sypsas, medical doctor and infectious disease expert
- Dimitrios Trichopoulos, cancer epidemiologist
- Georgina Xanthou, immunologist
- Panayotis Varotsos, physicist
- Leonidas Zervas, organic chemist
- Zoe Pikramenou, inorganic chemist
- Kypros Chrysanthis, medical doctor, writer and educator

=== Literature and philosophy ===
- Giorgios Seferis, Nobel laureate (1963), poet
- Odysseas Elytis, Nobel laureate (1979), poet
- Nikos Kazantzakis, writer and philosopher, nine times Nobel nominee
- Helene Ahrweiler, byzantinologist
- Cornelius Castoriadis, philosopher
- Dimitra Fimi, academic and writer
- Emmanuel Kriaras, lexicographer and philologist
- Vassilis Rotas, author, translator and politician
- Stathis Psillos, philosopher of science
- Simos Menardos, philologist, folklorist, rector of the University of Athens

=== Archaeology ===
- Stylianos Alexiou, archaeologist and philologist
- Semni Karouzou, archaeologist and curator
- Yannis Sakellarakis, archaeologist
- Evi Touloupa, archaeologist and curator
- Ino Nicolaou, archaeologist, epigraphist, numismatist
- Porphyrios Dikaios, archaeologist, director of the Department of Antiquities, Cyprus (1960–1963)
- Vassos Karageorghis, archaeologist, director of the Department of Antiquities, Cyprus (1963–1989)
- Athanasios Papageorgiou, Byzantine archaeologist, director of the Department of Antiquities (1989–1991)
- Demos Christou, archaeologist, director of the Department of Antiquities, Cyprus (1991–1997)

=== Theology ===
- Saint Nectarios of Aegina
- Ieronymos I of Athens, Archbishop of Athens and All Greece
- Anastasios of Albania, Archbishop of Albania
- Porfirije, Archbishop of Peć, Metropolitan of Belgrade and Karlovci, and Serbian Patriarch
- Demetrios Trakatellis, Archbishop of America

=== Other ===
- Christos Christou, International President of Médecins Sans Frontières
- Apostolos Santas, Greek veteran of the Resistance against the Axis Occupation of Greece during World War II
- Panayiotis Pikrammenos, judge, caretaker prime minister (2012), deputy prime minister (2019–2023)

== See also ==
- Athens University Museum
- Education in Greece
- List of modern universities in Europe (1801-1945)
- List of research institutes in Greece
- List of universities in Greece
- List of University of Athens alumni
- Open access in Greece
