= Daniel G. Nocera =

American chemist

Daniel Nocera
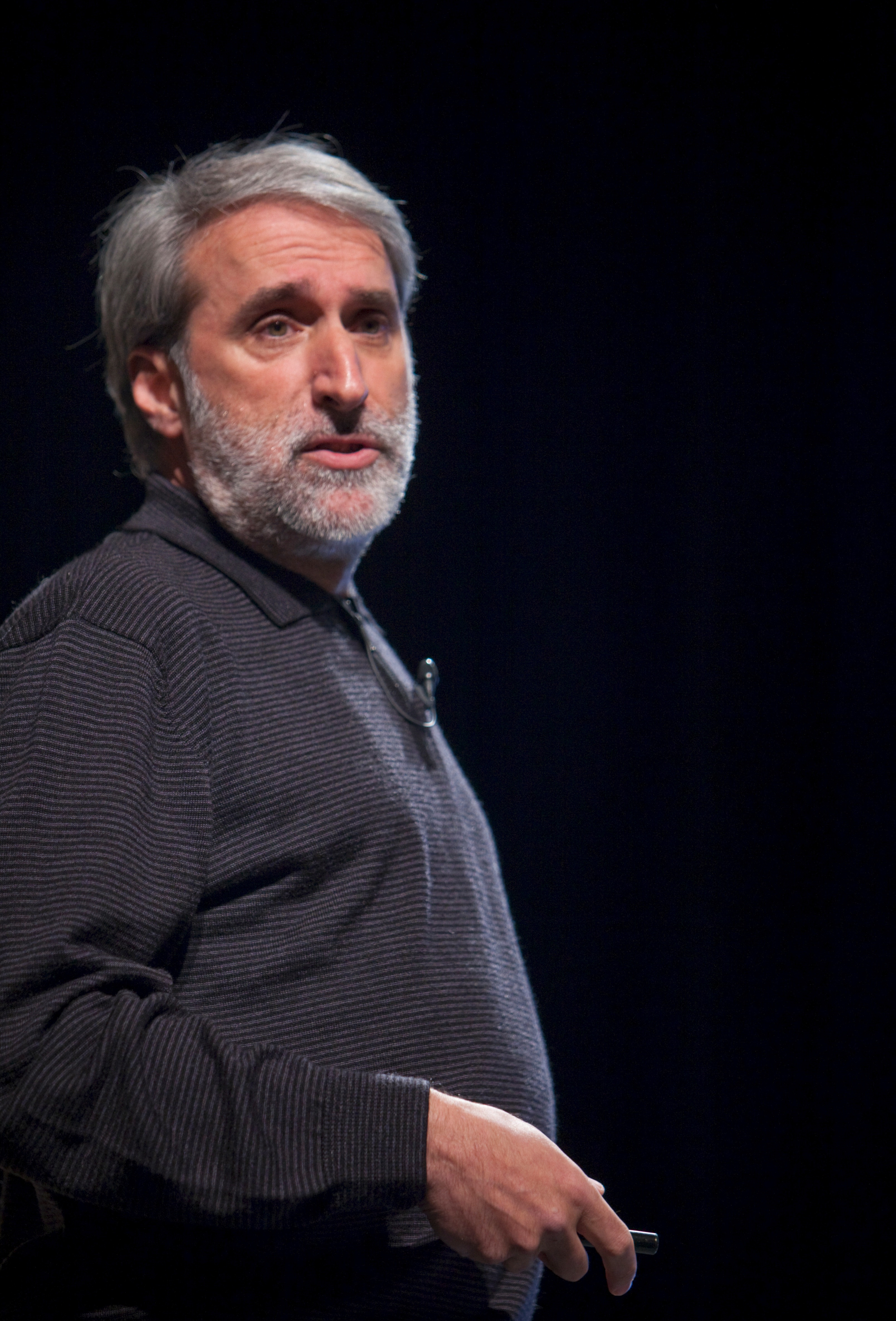
- Nocera speaking at PopTech
- Born: Daniel George Nocera; July 3, 1957 (age 69); Medford, Massachusetts, U.S.
- Education: Rutgers University (BS); California Institute of Technology (PhD)
- Known for: Artificial photosynthesis
- Scientific career
- Fields: Chemistry
- Workplaces: Harvard University; Massachusetts Institute of Technology; Michigan State University
- Thesis: Spectroscopy, electrochemistry, and photochemistry of polynuclear metal-metal bonded complexes (1984)
- Doctoral advisor: Harry B. Gray
- Doctoral students: Jenny Y. Yang, Christopher Chang, Michelle C. Chang, Zoe Pikramenou, Kwabena Bediako
- Other notable students: Jillian Lee Dempsey
- Website: nocera.harvard.edu

Daniel George Nocera (born July 3, 1957) is an American chemist, currently the Patterson Rockwood Professor of Energy in the Department of Chemistry and Chemical Biology at Harvard University. He is a member of the National Academy of Sciences and the American Academy of Arts and Sciences. In 2006 he was described as a "major force in the field of inorganic photochemistry and photophysics". Time magazine included him in its 2009 list of the 100 most influential people.

Nocera has opened up new areas of basic research into the mechanisms of energy conversion in biology and chemistry, including the study of multielectron excited states and proton coupled electron transfer (PCET). He works on research applications in artificial photosynthesis and solar fuels, including an "artificial leaf" that mimics photosynthesis in plants. In 2009, Nocera formed Sun Catalytix, a startup for development of the artificial leaf. The company was bought by Lockheed Martin in 2014.

== Early life and education ==
Daniel George Nocera was born July 3, 1957, in Medford, Massachusetts. He graduated from Bergenfield High School, Bergenfield, New Jersey, in 1975.

Nocera attended Rutgers University, where he worked with Lester R. Morss and Joseph Potenza. Nocera received a B.S. degree in chemistry from Rutgers University in 1979.

He then attended the California Institute of Technology, where he received a PhD in chemistry in 1984 for his work with Professor Harry B. Gray on the Spectroscopy, Electrochemistry, and Photochemistry of Polynuclear Metal-Metal Bonded Complexes. His work with Gray included the first experimental examination of electron transfer in ruthenium-modified proteins, since considered "a hallmark of research on protein electron transfer".

== Career and research ==
Nocera joined the faculty of Michigan State University in 1984 as assistant professor, and became a full professor at MSU in 1990.

He moved to Massachusetts Institute of Technology as a professor of chemistry in 1997, serving as the W. M. Keck Professor of Energy (2002–2007) and the Henry Dreyfus Professor of Energy (2007–2013). He was director of the Solar Revolution Project at MIT, founded in 2008. He became a co-director of the Eni Solar Frontiers Center at MIT when it was created on July 7, 2008.

In February 2012, Nocera agreed to move his research group to the Department of Chemistry and Chemical Biology at Harvard University in Cambridge, Massachusetts, where he became the Patterson Rockwood Professor of Energy.

Nocera's major areas of interest are in biological and chemical energy conversion, focusing on mechanisms at the molecular level and the photogeneration of hydrogen and oxygen. His work on artificial photosynthesis grows out of his basic research into mechanisms of energy conversion in biology and chemistry, particularly those involving multielectron excited states and proton coupled electron transfer (PCET).

Nocera argues that a better understanding of the photosynthesis process is essential to the development of energy strategies, because solar energy has the potential to scale up to meet long-term energy demands. He emphasizes that scientists must consider the economics of the materials they propose to use for energy sources and for storage technologies, if they are to develop viable energy alternatives.

=== Multielectron excited states ===
Nocera's early work on two-electron bonds and multielectron excited states is considered to have established new paradigms in excited-state chemistry. The idea behind two-electron mixed-valency is that single-electron mixed-valence compounds and two-electron mixed-valence compounds may be analogous: single-electron mixed-valence compounds may react in one-electron steps, while two-electron mixed-valence compounds may react in two-electron steps. Further, a two-electron bond can be predicted to give rise to four multielectronic states. Nocera and his lab have extensively studied the excited states of metal complexes and clusters. Two Photon Excitation Spectrum of a Twisted Quadruple Bond Metal−Metal Complex completed the description of the four requisite states for the prototypical quadruple bond of a transition metal complex.

Building on the ideas of two-electron mixed-valency, Heyduk and Nocera developed a light-driven molecular photocatalyst. The absorption of light caused the two RhII-X bonds of a dirhodium compound to break, resulting in an active rhodium catalyst which was able to react with hydrohalic acids. Their 2001 report on the generation of H_{2} from halohalic acid using a molecular photocatalyst is considered to have "opened the door" to photocatalytic production of fuels.

=== The artificial leaf ===
In 2008, Nocera and postdoctoral fellow Matthew Kanan were believed to have taken an important step towards artificial photosynthesis, when they created an anode electrocatalyst for the oxidation of water, capable of splitting water into hydrogen and oxygen gases. Their catalyst used cobalt and phosphate, relatively inexpensive and easily obtainable materials. The catalyst was able to split water into oxygen and protons using sunlight, and could potentially be coupled to a hydrogen gas producing catalyst such as platinum. Although the catalyst broke down during catalysis, it could repair itself.

In 2009, Nocera formed Sun Catalytix, a startup to develop a prototype design for a system to convert sunlight into storable hydrogen which could be used to produce electricity. Such a system would require both technological and commercial breakthroughs to create economically viable components for hydrogen storage, solar panels, and fuel cells. In October 2010, Nocera signed with the Tata Group of India to further support research and development. The ideal was to create a stand-alone miniature plant capable of providing enough "personalized energy" to power a small home. Such a device could provide power to homes in isolated areas that are currently inaccessible.

In 2011, Nocera and his research team announced the creation of the first practical "artificial leaf": an advanced solar cell the size of a playing card, capable of splitting water into oxygen and hydrogen with ten times the efficiency of natural photosynthesis. The silicon solar cell was coated with a thin film of cobalt catalyst on one side, over a protective membrane to prevent the silicon from oxidizing, and a nickel-based catalyst on the other side, to split hydrogen from water. The artificial leaf was featured in Time magazine's list of the top 50 inventions of 2011.

However, in May 2012, Sun Catalytix stated that it would not be scaling up the prototype. The predominant determiner of its cost, the construction of the photovoltaic infrastructure, was still considered too expensive to displace existing energy sources. Nocera was reportedly "daunted by the challenges of bringing the technology to market." Nonetheless, researchers at Harvard and elsewhere continue to investigate the possibilities of the artificial leaf, looking for ways to reduce costs and increase efficiency.

=== Low-cost flow battery ===
In hopes of developing a product that could be more rapidly brought to market, Sun Catalytix refocused its business model on developing a low-cost rechargeable flow battery for use in grid-scale and commercial-scale storage. In 2014, Sun Catalytix was acquired by Lockheed Martin, because it was interested in using the flow battery in its microgrid.

=== Proton-coupled electron transfer ===
The other area in which Nocera is considered a pioneer is proton-coupled electron transfer (PCET). While he did not originate the idea that electron transfer and proton transfer could be studied as coupled processes, he published one of the foundational papers demonstrating a model for such study in 1992. Using Zn porphyrin as a donor and 3,4- dinitrobenzoic acid as an acceptor, his team demonstrated photoexcitation of the Zn porphyrin and an electron transfer process utilizing a hydrogen bond. This also illustrated the viability of the approach as a model for studying biological energy conversion. PCET has become an important technique for studying energy conversion in biological processes at the molecular level.

=== Other research ===
Other contributions include synthesis of an S = 1/2 kagome lattice, of interest to the study of spin-frustrated systems and conduction mechanisms in superconductors; development of microfluidic optical chemosensors for use on the microscale and nanoscale; and molecular tagging velocimetry (MTV) techniques.

Nocera has published over 225 papers. He is a co-editor of Photochemistry and Radiation Chemistry (1998). He has served on scientific advisory boards and editorial boards of several large corporations. He was the inaugural editor of Inorganic Chemistry Communications, and was the inaugural chair of the editorial board for ChemSusChem.

== Awards and honors ==
Nocera has received a number of awards and honors, including the following:

- Eni-Italgas Prize for Energy & the Environment (2005)
- Member, American Academy of Arts and Sciences (2005)
- Inter-American Photochemistry Award in Photochemistry (2006)
- first recipient of the Burghausen Chemistry Award (2007)
- Harrison Howe Award from the Rochester Section of the ACS (2008)
- Member, National Academy of Sciences (2009)
- American Chemical Society Award in Inorganic Chemistry (2009)
- American Crystallographic Association’s Elizabeth A. Wood Award (2011)
- Leigh Ann Conn Prize for Renewable Energy from the University of Louisville (2015)
- Ira Remsen Award for chemistry (2012)

In 2021 he was elected to the American Philosophical Society.

== Controversy and allegations ==
In 2026, allegations surfaced that Harvard chemist Daniel Nocera was aware of the sexual harassment of a PhD student by his then-student, Kwabena Bediako, during their time at Harvard in 2017. Reports at the time alleged that Nocera failed to take significant disciplinary or corrective action following the disclosure. Following the public emergence of the controversy, Nocera's invitation to deliver the Seaborg Lectures at UC Berkeley's College of Chemistry was postponed without an officially stated reason.

Nocera has unequivocally denied the allegations, issuing a statement asserting that he would never act with levity or be cavalier when presented with claims of sexual harassment. He further stated, "These and any other allegations against me are defamatory and provably false, and if necessary, I will prove it in court."

== See also ==
- MIT Chemistry Department
- Photoelectrochemical cell
- Giacomo Luigi Ciamician
