= Michelle Chang (biochemist) =

American chemist (born 1977)

Michelle Chia-yu Chang
- Born: 1977 (age 47–48); San Diego, California, U.S.
- Education: University of California, San Diego (BS, BA); Massachusetts Institute of Technology (PhD)
- Spouse: Christopher Chang
- Scientific career
- Fields: Metabolic engineering Synthetic biology
- Institutions: University of California, Berkeley Princeton University
- Thesis: Proton-coupled electron transfer in the Escherichia coli ribonucleotide reductase (2004)
- Doctoral advisor: JoAnne Stubbe; Daniel G. Nocera
- Other academic advisors: Jay Keasling
- Website: michellechang.chemistry.princeton.edu

Michelle C. Y. Chang (born 1977) is the A. Barton Hepburn Professor of Chemistry at Princeton University. She is the recipient of several young scientist awards for her research in biosynthesis of biofuels and pharmaceuticals. Previously, she was a Professor of Chemistry and Chemical and Biomolecular Engineering at the University of California, Berkeley, before moving her lab to Princeton in January 2024.

== Education ==
Chang received her B.S. in biochemistry and B.A. in French literature from the University of California, San Diego, in 1997.

She then moved to the Massachusetts Institute of Technology for graduate school as a National Science Foundation Predoctoral Fellow (1997-2000) and M.I.T./Merck Foundation Predoctoral Fellow (2000-2002). She earned her Ph.D. in 2004 under the direction of JoAnne Stubbe and Daniel G. Nocera. During her graduate work, Chang studied proton-coupled electron transfer processes in ribonucleotide reductase enzymes, and demonstrated the first direct evidence of the radical transfer pathway of class I RNRs.

Following graduate school, she conducted research as a Jane Coffin Childs Memorial Fund for Medical Research Postdoctoral Fellow at University of California, Berkeley with Jay Keasling (2004-2007). At Berkeley, Chang studied enzyme-catalyzed reactions, demonstrating that by expressing plant P450 enzymes in bacteria like E. coli, the E. coli could be engineered to produce terpenoids, a class of natural products often found in drugs. Chang began her independent career at UC Berkeley in 2007. She joined the faculty at Princeton University in 2024.

== Awards ==
- 2007: The Camille and Henry Dreyfus Foundation New Faculty Award
- 2008: Arnold and Mabel Beckman Foundation Young Investigator Award
- 2008: TR35: Technology Review magazine Young Innovator Award
- 2009: National Science Foundation Faculty Early Career Development (CAREER) award
- 2010: Agilent Early Career Professor Award
- 2011: International Young Talents in Chemistry Award
- 2011: NIH Director's New Innovator Award
- 2012: Agnes Fay Morgan Research Award
- 2015: Arthur C. Cope Scholar Award
- 2016: Pfizer Award in Enzyme Chemistry

== Personal life ==
Michelle was born in San Diego, California, to Chinese immigrant parents from Taiwan. She is married to her colleague in the College of Chemistry, Christopher Chang.

== Publications ==
Chang's scientific papers are listed on her group's website.
