= Institute for Photovoltaics =

German research institute

Institute for Photovoltaics (ipv)
- Institute for Physical Electronics (ipe)
- Established: 1955
- Director: Michael Saliba
- Location: Stuttgart, Baden-Württemberg, Germany
- Affiliations: University of Stuttgart
- Website: www.ipv.uni-stuttgart.de/en/

The Institute for Photovoltaics (IPV) is a research institute of the Faculty of Computer Science, Electrical Engineering and Information Technology at the University of Stuttgart in Germany. Currently directed by Michael Saliba, it is one of Germany’s longest-established academic institutions dedicated to renewable energy research. Located on the university's Stuttgart-Vaihingen campus, the institute's work spans the manufacturing, characterization and application of semiconductor electronics and electrical energy storage systems, with a core focus on the clean energy transition.

== History ==
The institute was founded in 1955 as the Institute of Gas Discharge Technology and Photoelectronics (Institut für Gasentladungstechnik und Photoelektronik), initially focusing on thermionics and gas discharge physics. Later, it became the Institute for Physical Electronics (ipe) with a widened focus toward semiconductor physics and solar energy, effectively establishing Germany's first dedicated university institute for photovoltaics. During the 1970s and 1980s, the ipe emerged as a European pioneer in the development of thin-film solar cells, utilizing cadmium sulfide (CdS) and copper sulfide (Cu_{2}S) to lay the groundwork for modern high-efficiency CIGS architectures.

Driven by the oil crises of the 1970s, the institute expanded heavily into applied solar-hydrogen research throughout the 1980s. The ipe became an academic driver behind two major funding initiatives: the HYSOLAR project and a major interdisciplinary German Research Foundation (DFG) initiative titled "Hydrogen as an Energy Carrier" (SFB 270). To house the resulting large-scale experiments, the highly experimental HYSOLAR building was constructed on the campus in 1987. Designed by Behnisch & Partner, the building's deconstructivist metal-and-glass layout was intended to physically embody "solar architecture".

Since these successful laboratory milestones required industrial scaling, this motivated the foundation of the Centre for Solar Energy and Hydrogen Research Baden-Württemberg (ZSW) in 1988, transferring much of the applied research into what is now a leading European hub for commercial renewable energy technology. In 2011, the university facility was officially renamed the Institute for Photovoltaics (ipv). Today, the institute heavily explores next-generation solar architectures and quantum technologies, hosting major interdisciplinary programs such as the DFG Research Training Group GRK 2642 for photonic quantum technologies.

== Research structure ==
The institute integrates fundamental solid-state physics with applied electrical engineering. Research is officially organized into four core working groups:

- Emerging Materials: Investigates novel photovoltaic materials, with a specialized focus on the physics, chemistry and application of metal-halide perovskite solar cells, photodetectors and scintillators.
- High-Efficiency Solar Cells: Evaluates varying photovoltaic materials to develop highly efficient multi-junction solar cell and tandem solar cell architectures (such as perovskite-silicon tandems) aimed at pushing theoretical cell efficiencies.
- Electrical Energy Storage Systems: Researches the entire value chain of lithium-ion batteries from electrode preparation and cell characterization to simulation and module integration, as well as Power-to-X technologies and alkaline electrolysis.
- Nanoscale Microscopy and Characterization: Focuses on advanced imaging techniques and investigating the degradation mechanisms of optoelectronic materials at the nanometer scale.

== Technology transfer and networks ==
The institute actively collaborates with industrial partners to bridge the gap between academic research and commercial application. This has yielded several successful technology spin-offs, such as Perosol, a start-up focused on the commercial scaling and sustainable production of perovskite solar cells, or Cyclize, a spin-off developing plasma-based technologies to convert carbon dioxide and plastic waste into synthesis gas for the chemical industry.

== Notable alumni and researchers ==
Over its history, the institute has produced figures who have worked in the European renewable energy landscape:

- Werner H. Bloss (1930–1995): Institute Director and Professor from 1970 to 1995, pioneer of thin-film photovoltaics, founding director of the ZSW and recipient of the 1991 Becquerel Prize.
- Hans-Werner Schock (born 1946): Later becoming a Professor at the TU Berlin, Schock pioneered high-efficiency CIGS solar cells, founded the Competence Centre Thin-Film- and Nanotechnology for Photovoltaics Berlin (PVcomB) and won the 2010 Becquerel Prize.
- Helmfried Meinel: Former ipe scientific assistant (1981–1984) who transitioned into environmental policy, serving as Ministerialdirektor of the Baden-Württemberg Ministry of the Environment, Climate Protection and the Energy Sector from 2011 to 2021.
