= Georgina Xanthou =

Immunologist and associate professor

- Occupation: Immunologist
- Awards: Romain Pauwels Research Excellence Award, European Respiratory Society (2009); UNESCO Award for Women in Science (2009)

Academic background
- Education: BSc in Biomedical Sciences; PhD in Immunology
- Alma mater: National and Kapodistrian University of Athens; Imperial College London

Academic work
- Institutions: Biomedical Research Foundation of the Academy of Athens

Georgina Xanthou is an immunologist who serves as an associate professor at the Biomedical Research Foundation of the Academy of Athens.

Xanthou's research focuses on autoimmune and allergic diseases, particularly in understanding of immunological mechanisms through which cytokines control T cell pathogenicity towards environmental allergens and self-antigens. She has received awards, including the Romain Pauwels Research Excellence Award by the European Respiratory Society, the Allergopharma Award by the European Academy of Allergy and Clinical Immunology, and the UNESCO L’Oreal Award for Women in Science.

Xanthou serves as a board member on scientific advisory and grant review boards, as well as a peer scientific reviewer for journals, including PNAS, Nature, AJRCCM, European Respiratory Journal.

== Education and career ==
Xanthou holds a BSc in biomedical sciences from the Department of Biology in the National and Kapodistrian University of Athens, and a PhD in immunology from the University of Athens, Medical School. She completed a European Molecular Biology Organization-funded postdoctoral fellowship in the Division of Biomedical Sciences at the Faculty of Medicine in Imperial College, London.

In 2003, Xanthou was appointed as an instructor in the Cellular Immunology Laboratory at Biomedical Research Foundation Academy of Athens (BRFAA). She became an assistant professor in 2007 and has been an associate professor and group leader since 2019. In 2021-2023, she served as a visiting professor and senior project scientist at University of California, Los Angeles.

== Research ==
Xanthou has published over 50 peer-reviewed articles and book chapters. Her publications have been published in scientific journals, including Cell, Nature Reviews Immunology, Nature Immunology, JEM, JACI, Science-Business eXchange, Faculty of Medicine 1000, Global Medical Discovery Series, PNAS USA.

Xanthou's research focuses on immunology and inflammation, and more specifically on the role of dendritic cells and T cells in the regulation of autoimmune and allergic diseases, as well as cancer. In one of her highly cited articles, she demonstrated that the cytokine, osteopontin has a dual role in allergic airway disease, being pro-inflammatory during initial allergen sensitization and anti-inflammatory during subsequent allergen challenges, and highlighted its potential as a therapeutic target for allergic diseases. Her group has also made contributions to studying the role of the cytokine activin-A in regulating T Cell immune responses in the context of allergy, autoimmunity, and cancer.

== Awards and honors ==
- 2008 – Allergopharma Award, EAACI Executive Committee
- 2009 – UNESCO L’Oreal Award for Women in Science, UNESCO
- 2009 – Romain Pauwels Research Excellence Award, European Respiratory Society
- 2012 – Fellow Award, European Federation of Immunologic Societies
- 2014 – Fellowship, European Respiratory Society

== Selected articles ==
- Humbles, Alison A; Lloyd, Clare M; McMillan, Sarah J; Friend, Daniel S; Xanthou, Georgina; McKenna, Erin E; Ghiran, Sorina; Gerard, Norma P; Yu, Channing; Orkin, Stuart H; Gerard, Craig (2004-09-17). "A critical role for eosinophils in allergic airways remodeling". Science. 305 (5691): 1776–1779. Bibcode:2004Sci...305.1776H. doi:10.1126/science.1100283. PMID 15375268. S2CID 13955359.
- Petrakou, Eutichia; Fotopoulos, Spyros; Anagnostakou, Marina; Anatolitou, Fani; Samitas, Konstantinos; Semitekolou, Maria; Xanthou, Georgina; Xanthou, Marietta (2013-10-16). "Activin-A exerts a crucial anti-inflammatory role in neonatal infections". Pediatric Research. 74 (6): 675–681. doi:10.1038/pr.2013.159. PMID 24002335. S2CID 8741078.
- Semitekolou, Maria; Morianos, Ioannis; Banos, Aggelos; Konstantopoulos, Dimitris; Adamou-Tzani, Marina; Sparwasser, Tim; Xanthou, Georgina (2017-06-01). "Dendritic cells conditioned by activin A–induced regulatory T cells exhibit enhanced tolerogenic properties and protect against experimental asthma". The Journal of Allergy and Clinical Immunology. 141 (2): 671–684. doi:10.1016/j.jaci.2017.03.047. PMID 28579377. S2CID 205614932.
- Morianos, Ioannis; Trochoutsou, Aikaterini I; Papadopoulou, Gina; Semitekolou, Maria; Banos, Aggelos; Konstantopoulos, Dimitris; Manousopoulou, Antigoni; Kapasa, Maria; Wei, Ping; Lomenick, Brett; Belaidi, Elise; Kalamatas, Themis; Karageorgiou, Klinta; Doskas, Triantafyllos; Sallusto, Federica; Pan, Fan; Garbis, Spiros D; Quintana, Francisco J; Xanthou, Georgina (2020-06-02). "Activin-A limits Th17 pathogenicity and autoimmune neuroinflammation via CD39 and CD73 ectonucleotidases and Hif1-α–dependent pathways". Proceedings of the National Academy of Sciences of the United States of America. 117 (22): 12269–12280. Bibcode:2020PNAS..11712269M. doi:10.1073/pnas.1918196117. PMC 7275751. PMID 32409602. S2CID 218650260.
- Theofani, Efthymia; Semitekolou, Maria; Samitas, Konstantinos; Mais, Annie; Galani, Ioanna E; Triantafyllia, Vasiliki; Lama, Joanna; Morianos, Ioannis; Stavropoulos, Athanasios; Jeong, Se-Jin; Andreakos, Evangelos; Razani, Babak; Rovina, Nikoletta; Xanthou, Georgina (July 2022). "TFEB signaling attenuates NLRP3-driven inflammatory responses in severe asthma". Allergy. 77 (7): 131–2146. doi:10.1111/all.15221. PMID 35038351. S2CID 250118136.
