= Gerasimos Siasos =

Rector of the University of Athens (2023–today)

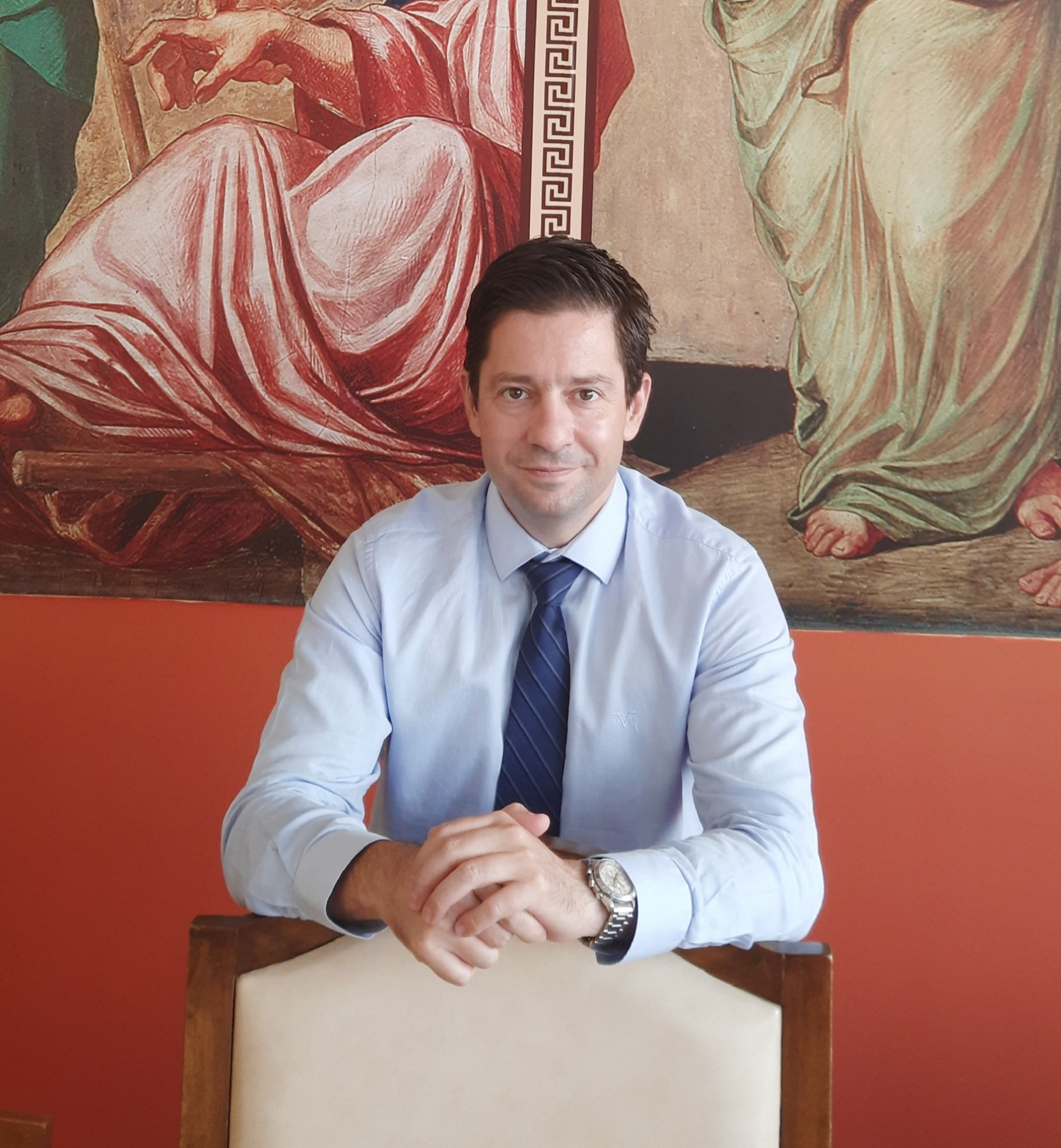
Siasos in 2022

Gerasimos Siasos (born 1979 in Thessaloniki, Greece) is a Greek Professor of cardiology and the current Rector of the National and Kapodistrian University of Athens, a position he has held since September 1, 2023. With his unanimous election, he became the youngest Rector of the University of Athens—the largest and oldest higher education institution in Greece—as well as the youngest person to have assumed the office of Rector at a Greek higher education institution.

He previously served as President of the School of Medicine at the University of Athens from 2021 to 2023, becoming the youngest elected President in the history of the School. From 2015 to 2016, he was a visiting professor at Harvard Medical School. He also served as vice-president of the School of Medicine at the University of Athens from 2019 to 2021, and as President of the Board of Directors of the "Aretaieio" and "Aiginiteio" University Hospitals during the same period. He currently serves as Director of the 3rd Clinical Department of Cardiology at the School of Medicine, University of Athens, based at the Athens General Hospital of Thoracic Diseases "Sotiria".

== Education ==
Gerasimos Siasos was born in Thessaloniki, Greece, in 1979. He received his medical degree from the School of Medicine of the University of Athens. He completed his residency in cardiology at the 1st Clinical Department of Cardiology and its affiliated 1st Cardiology-Haemodynamics Laboratory at the University of Athens' School of Medicine. He holds a Master of Science (MSc) degree in "Intensive Care Units - Cardiology, Medical, and Nursing Care" from the University of Athens, and an MSc in "Health Care Management" from the Hellenic Open University. He earned his PhD from the University of Athens' School of Medicine, graduating with First-Class Honours.

== Career ==
From 2015 to 2016, he was a Visiting assistant professor at Harvard Medical School based at the Cardiovascular Division of Brigham and Women's Hospital in Boston, Massachusetts. Between 2015 and 2017, he also served as a research affiliate at the Harvard-MIT Biomedical Engineering Center at the Massachusetts Institute of Technology. Since then, he has continued his collaboration as a research affiliate with the Vascular Profiling Research Group at Brigham and Women's Hospital, Harvard Medical School.

Siasos served as President (2021–2023) and previously vice-president (2019–2021) of the School of Medicine of the University of Athens. During the same period (2019–2021), he was also President of the Board of Directors of the "Aretaieio" and "Aiginiteio" University Hospitals.

Since 2018, he has been directing the "Heart and Diabetes Unit" within the 1st Clinical Department of Cardiology at the "Ippokrateio" General Hospital in Athens, as well as the 3rd Clinical Department of Cardiology at the University of Athens, based at the Athens General Hospital of Thoracic Diseases "Sotiria". In 2017, he played an instrumental role in establishing the 3rd Clinical Department of Cardiology at the Athens General Hospital of Thoracic Diseases "Sotiria" in his capacity as Alternate Director.

He is the founder and former President of the "Heart and Diabetes" Working Group of the Hellenic Society of Cardiology.

Siasos is the current Rector of the University of Athens, a position he has held since September 1, 2023, succeeding Professor Athanasios Dimopoulos.

During his tenure as Rector, and following his initiative, the University of Athens established a Βranch in Cyprus, marking a significant step in the University's internationalisation and strengthening its long-standing academic and cultural ties with the island.

Also during his time in office, in July 2026, the University was allocated a €130 million donation from Greece's four systemic banks, announced by the Hellenic Banks Association. The contribution was described by the University as the largest single donation it had received for decades.

Since 1 September 2026, Gerasimos Siasos has served as President of the Hellenic Universities Rectors’ Conference, having been elected to the position in July 2026 by a decision of the Conference’s Plenary Session, held on the island of Samos.

== Research ==
Siasos's research focuses on molecular cardiology, diabetes mellitus, vascular profiling, and endothelial function, with a particular emphasis on the mechanisms underlying atherosclerosis progression.

His body of work includes more than 500 peer-reviewed publications in leading international scientific journals, such as the Journal of the American College of Cardiology, the International Journal of Cardiology, and Current Medicinal Chemistry. He has served as Section Editor (Cardiovascular Diseases) for Current Medicinal Chemistry (Impact factor: 4.740). His research has been published in journals with a total impact factor exceeding 2.500, and his work has received over 32,000 citations in the international literature (H-index 74). His scholarly output comprises, among other contributions, the editing and authorship of 20 books and textbooks on cardiology.
