= Zoi Lygerou =

- Education: University of Athens (B.S.) University of Heidelberg (Ph.D.)
- Occupation: Molecular Biologist
- Years active: 1991 - present
- Known for: Research in Molecular Biology
- Awards: ERC Consolidation Grant Recipient (2012) SET - Routes University Ambassador (2007) EMBO Young Investigator

Zoi Lygerou is a Greek molecular biologist and associate professor at Patras Medical School. Lygerou's works have been published in such journals as the European Journal of Biochemistry, Journal of Cell Science, the Molecular and Cellular Biology journal, Journal of Biological Chemistry, and both Science and Nature journals among others. She is especially known for her work on cell cycle control mechanisms in eukaryotic organisms, and has done research at the University of Patras since 1999. Lygerou has also held positions at the European Molecular Biology Laboratory (EMBL) and at the Imperial Cancer Research Fund in London under Paul Nurse.

== Education and Career Accomplishments ==
Lygerou went to high school at Tositseio-Arsakeio. She then went on to receive her first biology degree from the National and Kapodistrian University of Athens (NKUA) in 1991. Five years after her graduation in 1991, she received her Ph.D.from the European Molecular Biology Laboratory at the University of Heidelberg in RNA processing. Apart from the EMBL, Lygerou has also worked at the Imperial Research Fund of London, where she studied cell cycle control in fission yeast as a postdoctoral fellow. At these respective institutions, Lygerou worked under Dr. Bertrand Séraphin along with Sir Paul Nurse. Lygerou has also received numerous distinctions and awards, which include the ERC Consolidation Grant Recipient in 2012, the SET - Routes University Ambassador in 2007, and the EMBO Young Investigator in 2001. She began working at Patras Medical School in 1999. Lygerou currently co-heads the Advanced Light Microscopy Facility at Patras Medical School.

== Research ==
Lygerou's research primarily focuses on post translational modification, otherwise known as RNA processing in humans. However, Lygerou is also known for her work in cell cycle control mechanisms and post translational modifications using fission yeast as a model organism.

Fission yeast are primarily used in Lygerou's studies on DNA synthesis during S phase in the cell cycle. Lygerou discovered that yeast are able to overcome licensing controls via over expressing Cdc18, which leads to DNA synthesis occurring despite mitosis not occurring.

Her cell cycle control mechanism research has focused on the phenomenon of replication licensing, and how this cellular mechanism is controlled via Cdc proteins such as Cdc18 and Cdc6 in yeast and humans, along with Cdt proteins such as Cdt1. Lygerou's research also focuses on how defects in these mechanisms may lead to carcinogenesis. Lygerou's lab also makes use of functional imaging in order to study human cells.

In 1996, Lygerou, along with her colleagues, identified an enzyme that is required for eukaryotic ribosomal RNA (pre-RNA) processing. More specifically, Ribonuclease (RNase) MRP was the identified protein. Lygerou, using fission yeast, identified that endonucleolytic cleavage of the pre-RNA is directly done by RNase MRP.

== Notable publications ==
- The Cdt1 protein is required to license DNA for replication in fission yeast
- Two E3 ubiquitin ligases, SCF-Skp2 and DDB1-Cul4, target human Cdt1 for proteolysis
- Accurate Processing of a Eukaryotic Precursor Ribosomal RNA by Ribonuclease MRP in Vitro
