= Christopher Chang =

American biochemist

Christopher J. Chang
- Born: 1974 (age 51–52); Ames, Iowa, U.S.
- Education: California Institute of Technology (BS, MS); Massachusetts Institute of Technology (PhD)
- Spouse: Michelle Chang
- Awards: ACS Cope Scholar Award (2010); Sackler Prize in Chemistry (2019)
- Scientific career
- Fields: Chemistry
- Workplaces: UC Berkeley Princeton University
- Thesis: Small-molecule activation chemistry catalyzed by proton-coupled electron transfer (2002)
- Doctoral advisor: Daniel G. Nocera
- Other academic advisors: Harry B. Gray, Jean-Pierre Sauvage, Stephen J. Lippard
- Notable students: Hemamala Karunadasa
- Website: chrischang.chemistry.princeton.edu

Christopher J. Chang is an American chemist and the Edward and Virginia Taylor Professor of Bioorganic Chemistry at Princeton University. Previously, he was a professor of chemistry and of molecular and cell biology at the University of California, Berkeley, where he holds the Class of 1942 Chair. Chang is also a member of the Helen Wills Neuroscience Institute, a Howard Hughes Medical Institute investigator, adjunct professor of pharmaceutical chemistry at the University of California, San Francisco, and faculty scientist at the chemical sciences division of Lawrence Berkeley Lab. He is the recipient of several awards for his research in bioinorganic chemistry, molecular and chemical biology.

His research interests include molecular imaging sensors for the study of redox biology and metals, especially as applied to neuroscience and immunology, metal catalysts for renewable energy cycles, and green chemistry.

== Early life and education ==
Chang was born in 1974 in Ames, Iowa, and was raised in Indiana. He attended the California Institute of Technology for his undergraduate degree, where he studied chemistry. At Caltech, he worked with Harry B. Gray on the synthesis and characterization of metal salen complexes of manganese and vanadium, and nitrogen and oxygen transfer reactivity with these complexes, respectively. Chang earned his BS and MS in chemistry in 1997, after which he worked in the laboratory of Jean-Pierre Sauvage at the Université Louis Pasteur as a Fulbright Fellow. In 1999, he moved to the Massachusetts Institute of Technology as a NSF/Merck Graduate Fellow. During his doctoral studies, Chang worked in the laboratory of Daniel G. Nocera. After earning his PhD in inorganic chemistry in 2002, Chang remained at MIT, working with Stephen J. Lippard as a Jane Coffin Childs Fellow.

== Independent career ==
In 2004, Chang began his independent career as an assistant professor of chemistry at the University of California, Berkeley. He was promoted to associate professor in 2009, and full professor of chemistry in 2012, when he was also appointed professor of molecular and cell biology and co-director, chemical biology graduate program. In 2024, he joined the faculty at Princeton University.

== Awards ==
- Davison Thesis Prize (Massachusetts Institute of Technology, 2003)
- Camille and Henry Dreyfus Foundation New Faculty Award (2004)
- Arnold and Mabel Beckman Foundation Beckman Young Investigators Award (2005)
- American Federation for Aging Research Award (2005)
- David and Lucile Packard Foundation Fellow
- National Science Foundation CAREER Award (2006)
- Paul Saltman Award, Metals in Biology GRC (2008)
- Amgen Young Investigator Award (2008)
- Hellman Faculty Award (2008)
- Bau Award in Inorganic Chemistry, Chinese Academy of Sciences (2008)
- TR35: Technology Review magazine Young Innovator Award (2008)
- Astra Zeneca Excellence in Chemistry Award (2009)
- Novartis Young Investigator Award in Organic Chemistry (2009)
- Donald Sterling Noyce Prize for Excellence in Undergraduate Teaching (2013)
- Blavatnik Award for Young Scientists (2015)
- Elected to the American Academy of Arts and Sciences (2017)
- Humboldt Research Award (2020)
- Guggenheim Fellowship (2021)
- Elected to the National Academy of Sciences (2026)

== Personal life ==
Christopher is married to his colleague in the department of chemistry, Michelle Chang.
