= Hemamala Karunadasa =

Chemist

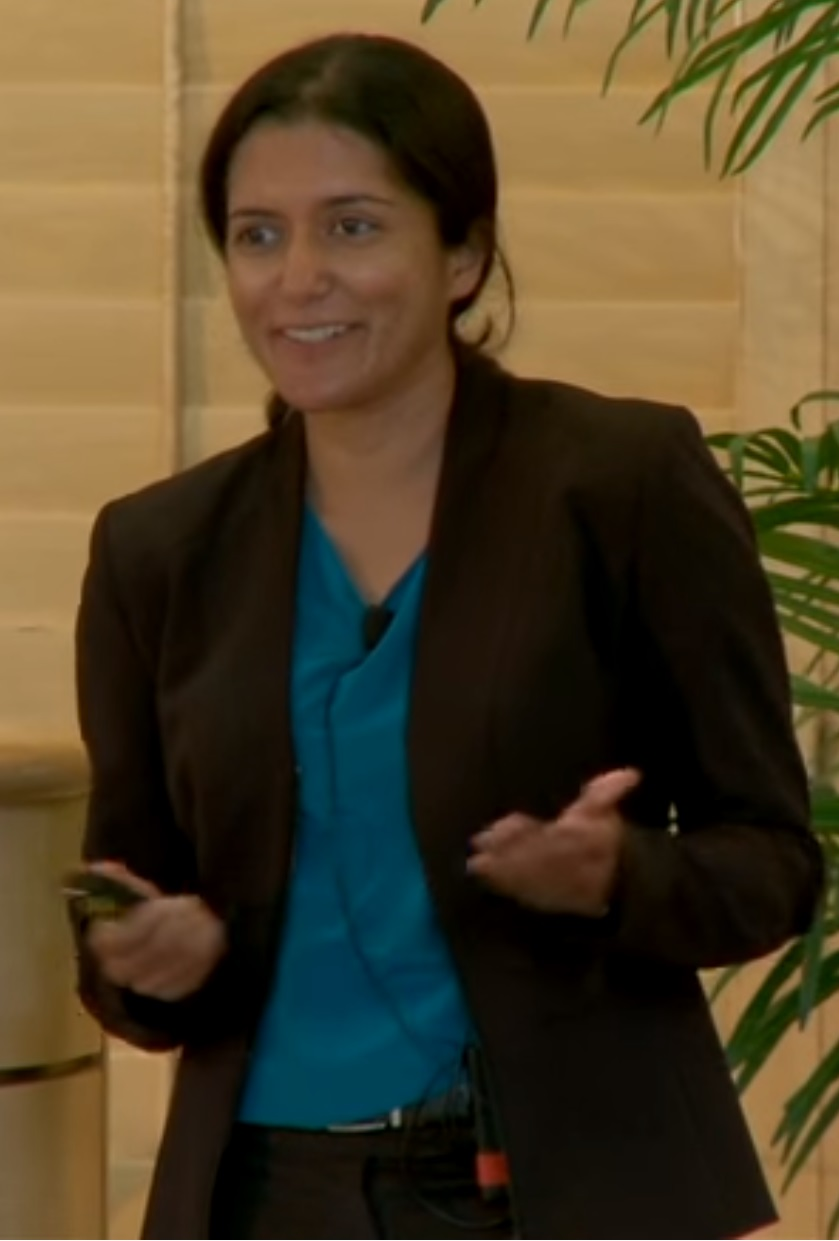
- Hemamala Karunadasa speaks at the Global Climate and Energy Project Symposium in 2014.
- Born: Hemamala Indivari Karunadasa
- Education: Ladies' College, Colombo
- Alma mater: Princeton University (A.B.) (2003); University of California, Berkeley (Ph.D.) (2009)
- Scientific career
- Fields: Inorganic Chemistry; Materials Science
- Institutions: Stanford University; California Institute of Technology; University of California, Berkeley
- Thesis: Heavy atom building units for magnetic materials and molecular catalysts for generating hydrogen from water (2009)
- Doctoral advisor: Jeffrey R. Long
- Other academic advisors: Harry B. Gray; Christopher Chang; Robert Cava
- Website: web.stanford.edu/group/karunadasalab

Hemamala Indivari Karunadasa is an assistant professor of chemistry at Stanford University. She works on hybrid organic – inorganic materials, such as perovskites, for clean energy and large area lighting.

== Early life and education ==
Karunadasa grew up in Colombo. She attended high school in Sri Lanka and was a student at Ladies' College, Colombo. She thought that she would become a doctor, and eventually decided to apply to university in America. She attended Princeton University, where she worked with Robert Cava on the geometric magnetic frustration of metal oxides. Cava's excitement about research inspired Karunadasa to continue her own academic career. Graduating with a degree in chemistry and a certificate in materials science and engineering, Karunadasa joined the University of California, Berkeley for her doctoral studies. There she worked in the lab of Jeffrey R. Long on heavy-atom building units for magnetic materials and electrocatalysts for water splitting. Karunadasa continued her work on water-splitting electrocatalysts with Jeffrey R. Long and Christopher Chang as a postdoctoral fellow. The molybdenum-oxo metal complex synthesized by Karunadasa is around seventy times cheaper than platinum, the most commonly used metal catalyst in water splitting. She then moved to the California Institute of Technology, where she worked on catalysts for hydrocarbon oxidation with Harry B. Gray as a BP Postdoctoral Fellow.

== Career ==
Karunadasa began her independent career at Stanford University in 2012. Her group synthesizes hybrid perovskite materials that combine small organic molecules with inorganic solids. Three-dimensional lead iodide perovskites are being investigated for solar cells, but they can be both unstable and toxic. For example, their sensitivity to water makes them difficult materials to use in the fabrication of large-scale devices. Karunadasa is interested in ways to mitigate these shortcomings, and any transient changes that may occur when these materials absorb light. In particular, Karunadasa has created two-dimensional perovskites, with thin inorganic sheets, that can be tuned to emit every colour of visible light. In these systems the organic small molecules are sandwiched between the sheets. In the case of thick inorganic sheets, the inorganic materials act as absorbers, and enhance the stability of the perovskite materials. The organo-metal-halide perovskites created by Karunadasa and her collaborator Michael D. McGehee can be processed in solution. She believes that through careful chemical design it is possible to determine the fate of photogenerated charge carriers. Karunadasa has investigated the lifetimes of acoustic phonons in lead iodide perovskites with Michael Toney and Aron Walsh.

=== Awards and honours ===
Her awards and honours include;

- 2003 Princeton University Outstanding Undergraduate Thesis in Inorganic Chemistry
- 2006 Tyco Electronics Graduate Fellowship
- 2011 BP Postdoctoral Fellowship
- 2013 Thieme Chemistry Journal Award
- 2014 International Conference on Coordination Chemistry ICCC41 Rising Star Award
- 2014 National Science Foundation CAREER Award
- 2015 Sloan Research Fellowship
- 2015 Stanford University Terman Faculty Fellowship
- 2020 American Chemical Society Harry Gray Award

=== Selected publications ===
Her publications include;

- Smith, Ian C.; Hoke, Eric; Solis-Ibarra, Diego; McGehee, Michael; Karunadasa, Hemamala (2014-09-04). "A layered hybrid perovskite solar‐cell absorber with enhanced moisture stability". Angewandte Chemie International Edition. 53 (42): 11232–11235. doi:10.1002/anie.201406466. PMID 25196933.
- Karunadasa, Hemamala; Montalvo, Elizabeth; Sun, Yujie; Majda, Marcin; Long, Jeffrey; Chang, Christopher (2012). "A molecular MoS2 edge site mimic for catalytic hydrogen generation". Science. 335 (6069): 698–702. Bibcode:2012Sci...335..698K. doi:10.1126/science.1215868. PMID 22323816. S2CID 7422855.
- Hoke, Erik; Daniel, Slotcavage; Dohner, Emma; Bowring, Andrea; Karunadasa, Hemamala; McGehee, Michael (2015). "Reversible photo-induced trap formation in mixed-halide hybrid perovskites for photovoltaics". Chemical Science. 6 (1): 613–617. doi:10.1039/C4SC03141E. PMC 5491962. PMID 28706629.

Her work was featured in the Journal of the American Chemical Society Young Investigators Issue in 2019. She serves on the editorial board of Inorganic Chemistry.
