= Jenny Y. Yang =

American chemist

- 楊又芳
- Born: Jenny Yue-fon Yang; California, U.S.
- Education: University of California, Berkeley (BS); Massachusetts Institute of Technology (PhD)
- Awards: Presidential Early Career Award for Scientists and Engineers; Sloan Research Fellowship; NSF Career Award
- Scientific career
- Fields: Organometallic chemistry
- Workplaces: California Institute of Technology; Pacific Northwest National Laboratory; University of California, Irvine
- Thesis: Distal hydrogen-bonding effects and cofacial bimetallic salen architectures for oxygen activation chemistry (2007)
- Doctoral advisor: Daniel G. Nocera
- Other academic advisors: Jeffrey R. Long, Daniel L. DuBois

Chinese name
- Traditional Chinese: 楊又芳
Transcriptions
Standard Mandarin
- Hanyu Pinyin: Yáng Yòufāng
- Wade–Giles: Yang Yu-fang
- Website: yanggroup.weebly.com

Jenny Yue-fon Yang (Chinese: 楊又芳; pinyin: Yáng Yòufāng) is an American chemist. She is a professor of chemistry at the University of California, Irvine, where she leads a research group focused on inorganic chemistry, catalysis, and solar fuels.

== Early life and education ==
Jenny Yue-fon Yang was born to a Taiwanese American family in the San Fernando Valley and raised in Chatsworth, Los Angeles. Her parents were Taiwanese immigrants.

Yang studied chemistry at the University of California, Berkeley, where she worked in the laboratory of Jeffrey R. Long. Yang synthesized novel Prussian blue analog materials and analyzed their magnetic properties. She graduated in 2001 with a Bachelor of Science in chemistry, and moved to the Massachusetts Institute of Technology for graduate studies in the laboratory of Daniel G. Nocera. Yang's work in the Nocera lab focused on the synthesis of novel salen complexes that mimic the activity of the catalase enzyme, and exhibit epoxidation activity towards olefins. She graduated with her Ph.D. in 2007.

== Career ==
Yang moved to Washington to conduct postdoctoral research at the Pacific Northwest National Laboratory (PNNL), where she worked with Daniel L. DuBois on mechanistic studies of H_{2} oxidation with nickel bis(diphosphine) complexes. In 2009, she was hired as a senior staff scientist at PNNL. She then worked as a research scientist at the Molecular Catalysis group of the Joint Center for Artificial Photosynthesis at the California Institute of Technology. In 2013, Yang joined the faculty at University of California, Irvine as an assistant professor of chemistry.

Yang publishes in the area inorganic and organometallic chemistry, electrocatalysis, as well as materials science.

== Awards and honors ==
Yang has received several awards. These include the DoE Early Career Research Award in 2014 and the National Science Foundation CAREER Award in 2016. In 2017, she was honored with the Presidential Early Career Award for Scientists and Engineers (PECASE), the Kavli Frontiers of Science Fellowship, and a Research Corporation Advanced Energy Materials Scialog Fellowship. In 2018, she was awarded a Sloan Research Fellowship, and in 2019 she was named a Camille Dreyfus Teacher-Scholar. In 2015, Yang was selected as a member of the Global Young Academy and in 2018, she was named a CIFAR Azrieli Global Scholars.
