= AAP Red Book =

Manual on childhood illness

The AAP Red Book, or Report of the Committee on Infectious Diseases of the American Academy of Pediatrics, is a hardcover, softcover, and electronic reference to the "manifestations, etiology, epidemiology, diagnosis, and treatment of some 200 childhood infectious diseases".

The Red Book first appeared as an eight-page booklet in 1938. The most-recent 33rd edition, published in 2024 and covering through 2027, has grown to 1261 pages.
