= The Journal of Allergy and Clinical Immunology =

- Discipline: Allergy, immunology
- Language: English
- Edited by: Zuhair Ballas

Publication details
- Former name: Journal of Allergy
- History: 1929–present
- Publisher: Mosby
- Frequency: Monthly
- Impact factor: 14.2 (2022)

Standard abbreviations
- ISO 4: J. Allergy Clin. Immunol.

Indexing
- CODEN: JACIBY
- ISSN: 0091-6749 (print); 1097-6825 (web)
- LCCN: 96660636
- OCLC no.: 1252724029

Links
- Journal homepage; Online archive

The Journal of Allergy and Clinical Immunology (JACI) is a monthly peer-reviewed medical journal covering research on allergy and immunology. It is one of three official journals of the American Academy of Allergy, Asthma, and Immunology. The journal was established in 1929 as the Journal of Allergy and obtained its current name in 1971. The name change was purportedly related to a change in the attitude among physicians about the breadth of applicability of the term "allergy". The journal has been published under the Mosby imprint since its inception.

According to the Journal Citation Reports, the journal has a 2021 impact factor of 14.29, ranking it second out of 25 in the category "Allergy".

The editor-in-chief is Zuhair K. Ballas, who succeeded Donald Y.M. Leung (1997–2015) in 2016.
