= Kwabena Bediako =

Ghanaian-British chemist

Daniel Kwabena Dakwa Bediako
- Born: 1986 (age 39–40); Accra, Ghana
- Education: Harvard University Ph.D. (2015) Massachusetts Institute of Technology M.S. (2013) Calvin College B.S. (2008)
- Scientific career
- Workplaces: Harvard University; University of California, Berkeley
- Thesis: The Electrocatalytic Evolution of Oxygen and Hydrogen by Cobalt and Nickel Compounds. (2015)
- Doctoral advisor: Daniel G. Nocera
- Other academic advisors: Douglas Vander Griend, Philip Kim
- Website: Bediako Lab

Daniel Kwabena Dakwa Bediako is a Ghanaian-British chemist. He is currently an associate professor at the University of California, Berkeley, and is the Cupola Era Professor in the college of chemistry. His research considers charge transport and interfacial charge transfer in two-dimensional materials and heterostructures. He is also a member of the Editorial Advisory Board of the Journal of the American Chemical Society (JACS). Kwabena is currently under investigation for sexual harassment.

== Early life and education ==
Bediako was born in Accra, Ghana in 1986 to Kwame Bediako, a Ghanaian, and Gillian Mary Bediako, British. He grew up in Akropong, Ghana, but also spent portions of his childhood in Edinburgh. Bediako was a student at the Akosombo International School through elementary and high school. During his time at high school, Bediako became interested in chemistry and was influenced by his high school chemistry teacher.

In 2004, he moved to the United States to attend Calvin University as an undergraduate student. At Calvin University, Bediako did research with Douglas Vander Griend, an inorganic chemistry professor, and became interested in inorganic coordination chemistry. He graduated with honors in 2008, and joined UOP LLC to study new catalysts for industrial applications.

After a year in industry, Bediako moved to the East Coast, where he joined the laboratory of Daniel G. Nocera at the Massachusetts Institute of Technology. Bediako eventually earned his master's degree at MIT, where he worked on mechanistic studies of water splitting electrocatalysis, and the development of metal catalysts for solar energy storage. At MIT, he also worked on devices that use electricity from photovoltaic cells to generate hydrogen than can be used in fuel cells, and was part of the team who developed the components of the artificial leaf; a device which makes use of bacteria to convert solar energy into a liquid fuel. When Nocera moved to Harvard University, Bediako moved with him, and completed his doctoral research on the catalytic behavior of structurally disordered first row transition metal oxides.

== Research and career ==
After completing his doctorate, Bediako remained at Harvard University as a postdoctoral research fellow in Philip Kim's group. Here he looked at quantum transport through two-dimensional van der Waals heterostructures. Here he focused on isolating ultra-thin layers of materials and precisely positioning them into a super-structure. By stacking materials in such a way, and embedding lithium ions between the individual layers, Bediako showed that it was possible to engineer higher electrochemical capacities.

In 2018, Bediako started a faculty position at the University of California, Berkeley. He has been awarded an Office of Naval Research Young Investigator Award, a United States Air Force Young Investigator Award and a United States Department of Energy Early Career Award. He received the CIFAR Azrieli Global Scholar award in 2020.

== Select publications ==
- Kazmierczak, Nathanael P.; Van Winkle, Madeline; Ophus, Colin; Bustillo, Karen C.; Brown, Hamish G.; Carr, Stephen; Ciston, Jim; Taniguchi, Takashi; Watanabe, Kenji; Bediako, D. Kwabena (2021). "Strain fields in twisted bilayer graphene". Nature Materials. 20 (7): 956–963. arXiv:2008.09761. Bibcode:2021NatMa..20..956K. doi:10.1038/s41563-021-00973-w. PMID 33859383. S2CID 221266812.
- Bediako, DK; Rezaee, M; Yoo, H; Larson, DT; Zhao, SYF; Taniguchi, T; Watanabe, K; Brower-Thomas, TL; Kaxiras, E; Kim, P (June 2018). "Heterointerface effects in the electrointercalation of van der Waals heterostructures". Nature. 558 (7710): 425–429. arXiv:1711.03465. Bibcode:2018Natur.558..425B. doi:10.1038/s41586-018-0205-0. PMID 29925970. S2CID 49354146.
- Bediako, DK; Solis, BH; Dogutan, DK; Roubelakis, MM; Maher, AG; Lee, CH; Chambers, MB; Hammes-Schiffer, S; Nocera, DG (21 October 2014). "Role of pendant proton relays and proton-coupled electron transfer on the hydrogen evolution reaction by nickel hangman porphyrins". Proceedings of the National Academy of Sciences of the United States of America. 111 (42): 15001–6. Bibcode:2014PNAS..11115001B. doi:10.1073/pnas.1414908111. PMC 4210285. PMID 25298534.
- Bediako, D. Kwabena; Surendranath, Yogesh; Nocera, Daniel G. (2013-03-06). "Mechanistic Studies of the Oxygen Evolution Reaction Mediated by a Nickel–Borate Thin Film Electrocatalyst". Journal of the American Chemical Society. 135 (9): 3662–3674. doi:10.1021/ja3126432. ISSN 0002-7863. PMID 23360238.
- Bediako, D. Kwabena; Lassalle-Kaiser, Benedikt; Surendranath, Yogesh; Yano, Junko; Yachandra, Vittal K.; Nocera, Daniel G. (2012-04-18). "Structure–Activity Correlations in a Nickel–Borate Oxygen Evolution Catalyst". Journal of the American Chemical Society. 134 (15): 6801–6809. doi:10.1021/ja301018q. ISSN 0002-7863. PMID 22417283.

== Personal life ==
Bediako is a fan of Manchester United F.C.

Bediako's older brother, Timothy Yaw Bediako, received a PhD in immunology and works as a principal investigator at the West African Center for Cell Biology of Infectious Pathogens (WACCBIP).
