= Molecular magnet =

Molecular magnet can refer to:

- Molecule-based magnet, an unconventional magnetic material that consists of organic molecules, coordination compounds, or combinations
- Single-molecule magnet, a single molecule that exhibits magnetic hysteresis of itself, without collective long-range ordering
