= Michael D. McGehee =

American engineer

Michael David McGehee is an American engineer.

McGehee earned a Bachelor of Arts in physics at Princeton University in 1994, followed by a doctorate in materials science from the University of California at Santa Barbara in 1999. He taught at Stanford University until 2018, and led the McGehee Group of researchers. McGehee subsequently joined the University of Colorado Boulder as Patten Endowed Chair in Chemical Engineering, and relocated the McGehee Research Group to CU Boulder as well.
