= Proton-coupled electron transfer =

Chemical reaction mechanism

A Proton-coupled electron transfer (PCET) is a chemical reaction that involves the transfer of electrons and protons from one atom to another. The term was originally coined for single proton, single electron processes that are concerted, but the definition has relaxed to include many related processes. Reactions that involve the concerted shift of a single electron and a single proton are often called Concerted Proton-Electron Transfer or CPET.

In PCET, the proton and the electron (i) start from different orbitals and (ii) are transferred to different atomic orbitals. They transfer in a concerted elementary step. CPET contrast to step-wise mechanisms in which the electron and proton are transferred sequentially.

ET
[HX] + [M] → [HX]^{+} + [M]^{−}

PT
[HX] + [M] → [X]^{−} + [HM]^{+}

CPET
[HX] + [M] → [X] + [HM]

== Examples ==
PCET is thought to be pervasive. Important examples include water oxidation in photosynthesis, nitrogen fixation, oxygen reduction reaction, and the function of hydrogenases. These processes are relevant to respiration and have been linked to interprotein electron transfer between cytochrome c and complex III.

=== Simple models ===
Reactions of relatively simple coordination complexes have been examined as tests of PCET.

- The comproportionation of a Ru(II) aquo and a Ru(IV) oxo (bipy = (2,2'-bipyridine, py = pyridine):

[(bipy)_{2}(py)Ru^{IV}(O)]^{2+} + [(bipy)_{2}(py)Ru^{II}(OH_{2})]^{2+} → 2 [(bipy)_{2}(py)Ru^{III}(OH)]^{2+}

- Electrochemical reactions where reduction is coupled to protonation or where oxidation is coupled to deprotonation.

=== The square scheme ===
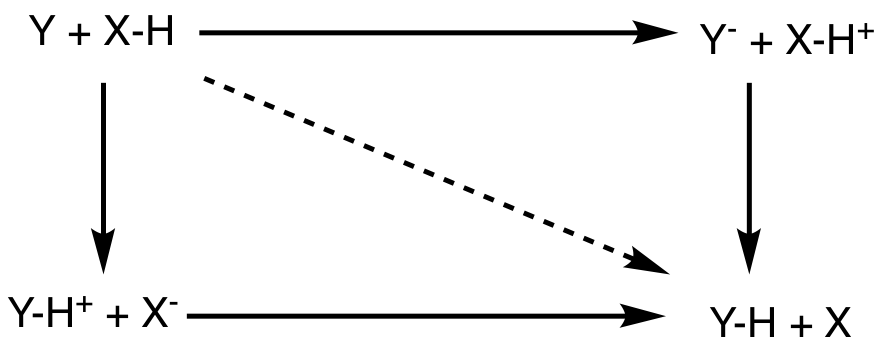
"Square scheme" used to discuss PCET (diagonal) vs discrete electron transfer and proton transfers.

Although it is relatively simple to demonstrate that the electron and proton begin and end in different orbitals, it is more difficult to prove that they do not move sequentially. The main evidence that PCET exists is that a number of reactions occur faster than expected for the sequential pathways. In the initial electron transfer (ET) mechanism, the initial redox event has a minimum thermodynamics barrier associated with the first step. Similarly, the initial proton transfer (PT) mechanism has a minimum barrier associated with the protons initial pK_{a}. Variations on these minimum barriers are also considered. The important finding is that there are a number of reactions with rates greater than these minimum barriers would permit. This suggests a third mechanism lower in energy; the concerted PCET has been offered as this third mechanism. This assertion has also been supported by the observation of unusually large kinetic isotope effects (KIE).

A typical method for establishing PCET pathway is to show that the individual ET and PT pathways operate at higher activation energy than the concerted pathway.

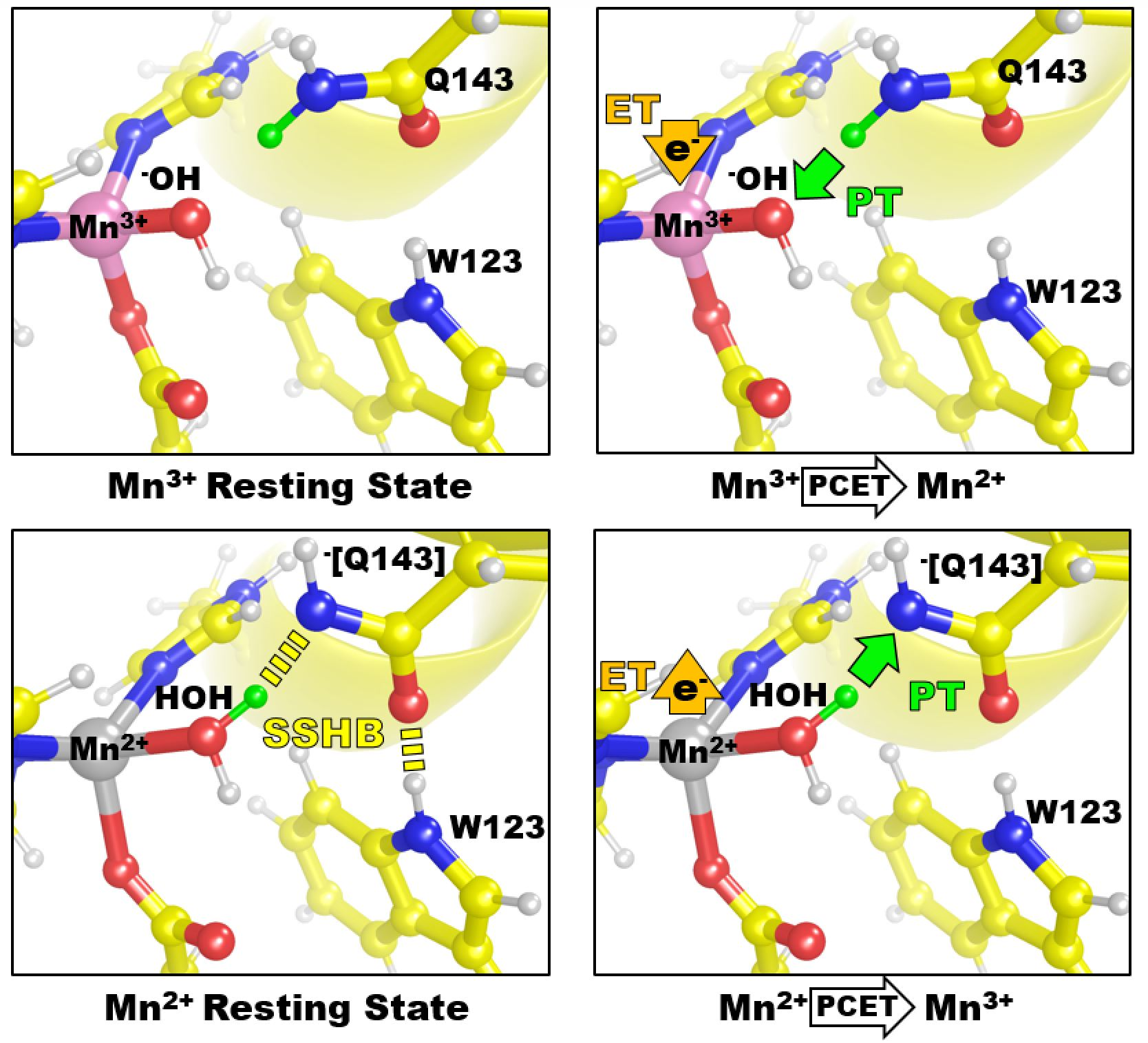
The PCETs of SOD2 use PTs between Q143 and a Mn-bound solvent molecule. Deprotonation of Q143 is stabilized with SSHBs shown as yellow-hashed lines. ETs occur with the substrate, superoxide, not shown in the figure.

=== In proteins ===
SOD2 uses cyclic proton-coupled electron transfer reactions to convert superoxide (O_{2}^{•-}) into either oxygen (O_{2}) or hydrogen peroxide (H_{2}O_{2}), depending on the oxidation state of the manganese metal and the protonation status of the active site.

Mn^{3+} + O_{2}^{•-} ↔ Mn^{2+} + O_{2}

Mn^{2+} + O_{2}^{•-} + 2H^{+} ↔ Mn^{3+} + H_{2}O_{2}

The protons of the active site have been directly visualized and revealed that SOD2 utilizes proton transfers between a glutamine residue and a Mn-bound solvent molecule in concert with its electron transfers. During the Mn^{3+} to Mn^{2+} redox reaction, Gln143 donates an amide proton to hydroxide bound to the Mn and forms an amide anion. The amide anion is stabilized by short-strong hydrogen bonds (SSHBs) with the Mn-bound solvent and the nearby Trp123 residue. For the Mn^{2+} to Mn^{3+} redox reaction, the proton is donated back to the glutamine to reform the neutral amide state. The fast and efficient PCET catalysis of SOD2 is explained by the use of a proton that is always present and never lost to bulk solvent.

== Related processes ==
Hydrogen atom transfer (HAT) is distinct from PCET. In HAT, the proton and electron start in the same orbitals and move together to the final orbital. HAT is recognized as a radical pathway, although the stoichiometry is similar to that for PCET.
