= Barbara Wold =

Professor of Molecular Biology

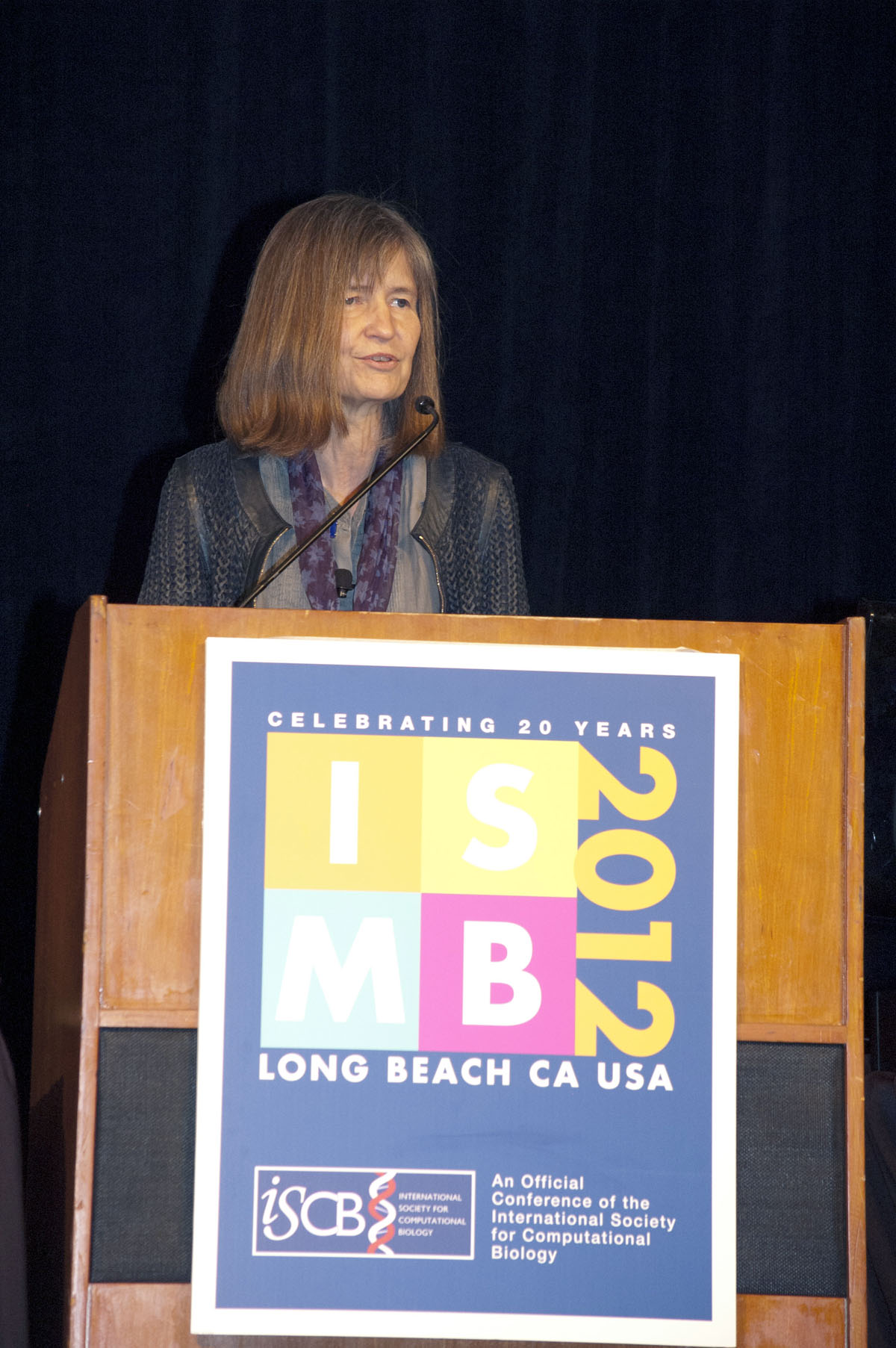
- Born: 1951 (age 74–75)
- Education: Arizona State University (Tempe), California Institute of Technology
- Scientific career
- Fields: Developmental Biology and Genetics, Systems Biology
- Workplaces: Beckman Institute, California Institute of Technology
- Thesis: Studies of structural gene transcripts in sea urchin embryos and adult tissues (1978)
- Doctoral advisor: Eric H. Davidson
- Doctoral students: Tracy Teal; Ardem Patapoutian

Barbara Jane Wold is the Bren Professor of Molecular Biology, the principal investigator of the Wold Lab at the California Institute of Technology (Caltech) and the principal investigator of the Functional Genomics Resource Center at the Beckman Institute at Caltech. Wold was director of the Beckman Institute at Caltech from 2001 to 2011.

== Education ==
Barbara Wold graduated with a B. S. in zoology from Arizona State University (Tempe) in 1973. She was inspired by laboratory work with zoology professor Shelby Gerking and developmental biologist Jerry Justus, and lectures with professor emerita Kathleen Church. While at ASU, Wold became interested in understanding the informational code that regulates gene expression. She also met her husband, geophysicist Lawrence "Larry" Burdick.

Wold received a Ph.D. in molecular developmental biology from the California Institute of Technology (Caltech) in 1978, studying genome structure and gene regulation during embryo development. She was appointed as a postdoctoral research fellow at Columbia University College of Physicians and Surgeons in 1978. There she developed methods for assaying cis-regulatory element function.

== Career ==
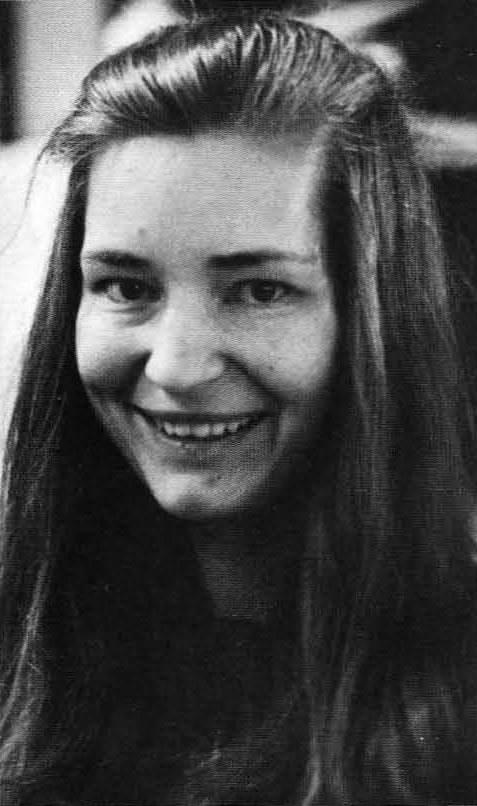
Wold in 1986

In 1981, Wold returned to Caltech as an assistant professor in the Biology department. She was promoted to associate professor in 1988 and full professor in 1996, holding the position until 2002. She became Bren Professor of Molecular Biology as of 2003.

Wold helped to found the L. K. Whittier Gene Expression Center at Caltech in 1999, with Stephen Quake and Mel Simon, collaborating with the Human Genome Project. She has also been involved in establishing the Center for Biological Circuit Design at Caltech. She has been an advisor to the National Institutes of Health and the Department of Energy in the area of genomics.

Wold was director of the Beckman Institute at Caltech from 2001 to 2011, succeeding founding director Harry B. Gray. As of January 30, 2012, she was succeeded as director by David A. Tirrell. Wold was the director of the Merkin Institute from 2019 to 2023.

== Research ==
“It’s important to appreciate that discovery is often a lengthy process, requiring much persistence.”

Barbara Wold has published more than sixty papers in the areas of developmental biology and genetics. Throughout her career, Wold has focused on exploring the architecture and logic of gene regulatory networks, in an effort to understand the mechanisms that drive cell state transitions in the development and differentiation of individual cells. In particular, she has investigated the ways in which these differentiation mechanisms are encoded in DNA, and furthermore, how they are executed via transcription.

Beginning with undifferentiated precursor cells, Wold and her lab have focused particularly on transitions from mesodermal cells in early development to fully developed skeletal muscle and cardiac muscle in animals, primarily through the use of mouse models. In addition, she is interested in the transitions in cell development which lead to tumorigenesis.

Wold and her lab have used various techniques, including genome-wide and proteome-wide assays, wet-bench genomic technology, and computational methods, many of which they have developed in conjunction with other researchers, to study skeletal muscle development, degeneration and regeneration. She has also used such techniques as microarray gene expression analysis, global protein/DNA interaction measures, mass spectrometry-based proteomics, and comparative genomics. In collaboration with others, her lab has also pioneered a modification of mass spectrometry and dual-affinity epitope tagging that enables efficient and accurate classification of multi-protein complexes.

Much of Wold's recent work focuses on biological information processing, developing and using new techniques such as ultra-high-throughput DNA sequencing techniques to computationally model the inputs and outputs of gene networks. She studies embryonic development and regeneration in vertebrates, examining transcriptional networks and using comparative genomics to model mouse, human and dog genomes. This work is leading to increased understanding of direct transcriptional regulation and of post-transcriptional and translational mechanisms and their mediation by microRNAs. Wold's goal is a deep understanding of biological circuit design and the mechanisms of genetics and cell development. To this end, Wold seeks to use her research to contribute to the development of the international reference transcriptome and regulatory element databases.

Wold's lab has recently been concerned with human disease genomics. In particular, they are looking into diseases such as Alzheimer's, cancer, and musculoskeletal disorders. In 2020, Wold's work in RNA sequencing and expression in mice was recognized by the American Association for Cancer Research, which awarded her with that year's AACR-Irving Weinstein Foundation Distinguished Lectureship.

== Awards and honors ==
- 2023, Fellow of the American Academy of Arts and Sciences
- 2014, School of Life Sciences (SOLS) Distinguished Alumni Award, Arizona State University
- 1983, Searle Scholars Program
- 1983, Rita Allen Foundation Scholar

== Selected publications ==
- Jingli A Zhang; Ali Mortazavi; Brian A Williams; Wold, Barbara; Rothenberg, Ellen (2012). "Dynamic transformations of genome-wide epigenetic marking and transcriptional control establish T cell identity". Cell. 149 (2): 467–482. doi:10.1016/j.cell.2012.01.056. PMC 3336965. PMID 22500808. Wikidata Q42136153.
- Wen Zhou; Yui, Mary A.; Brian A Williams; Jina Yun; Wold, Barbara; Long Cai; Rothenberg, Ellen (2019). "Single-Cell Analysis Reveals Regulatory Gene Expression Dynamics Leading to Lineage Commitment in Early T Cell Development". Cell Systems. 9 (4): 321-337.e9. doi:10.1016/j.cels.2019.09.008. PMID 31629685. Wikidata Q90821356.
- Kellis, Manolis; Wold, Barbara; Snyder, Michael P; et al. (2014). "Defining functional DNA elements in the human genome". Proceedings of the National Academy of Sciences of the United States of America. 111 (17): 6131–8. Bibcode:2014PNAS..111.6131K. doi:10.1073/pnas.1318948111. PMC 4035993. PMID 24753594. Wikidata Q22066251.
