= Beckman Institute at Caltech =

Research center in Pasadena, California, US

Coordinates: 34.139060°N 118.124503°W

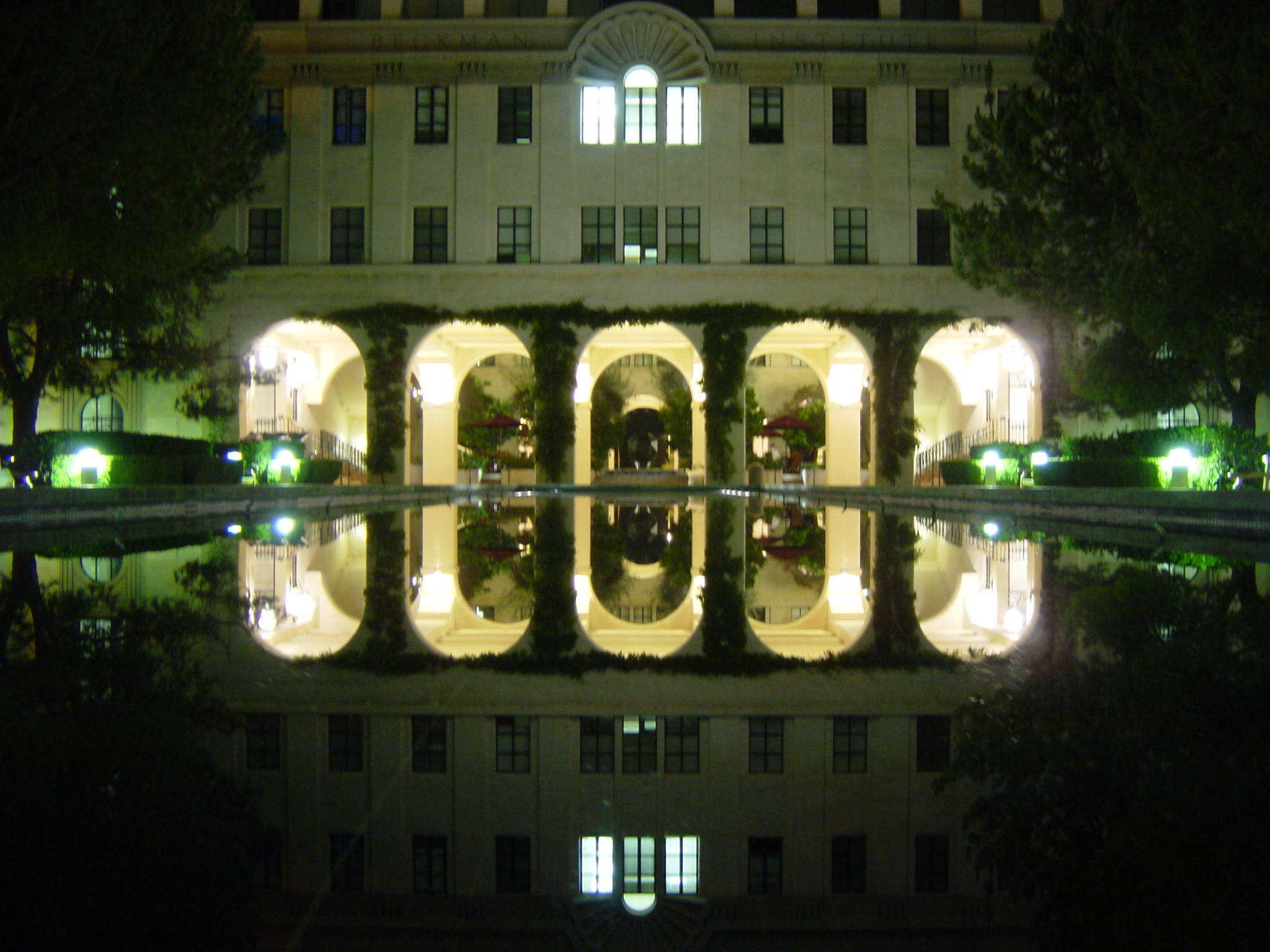
- Beckman Institute at Caltech, 2002
- Established: 1990
- Field of research: Chemical and biological sciences
- Director: Dennis A. Dougherty
- Location: Pasadena, California, United States
- Affiliations: California Institute of Technology
- Website: http://beckmaninstitute.caltech.edu/

The Beckman Institute at Caltech is a multi-disciplinary center for research in the chemical and biological sciences, located at and partnering with the California Institute of Technology (Caltech) in Pasadena, California, United States.

== Founding ==
Founding of the Beckman Institute at Caltech was supported by a major philanthropic gift from the Arnold Orville Beckman and his wife Mabel, through the Arnold and Mabel Beckman Foundation. Beckman had a long-term relationship with Caltech as a student, teacher and trustee. After discussions with chemists Harry B. Gray and Peter Dervan, and biologists Eric H. Davidson and Leroy Hood, Beckman announced in 1986 that he would donate $50 million to establish the institute and an accompanying endowment. The Beckman Institute at Caltech was chartered by Caltech in 1987.

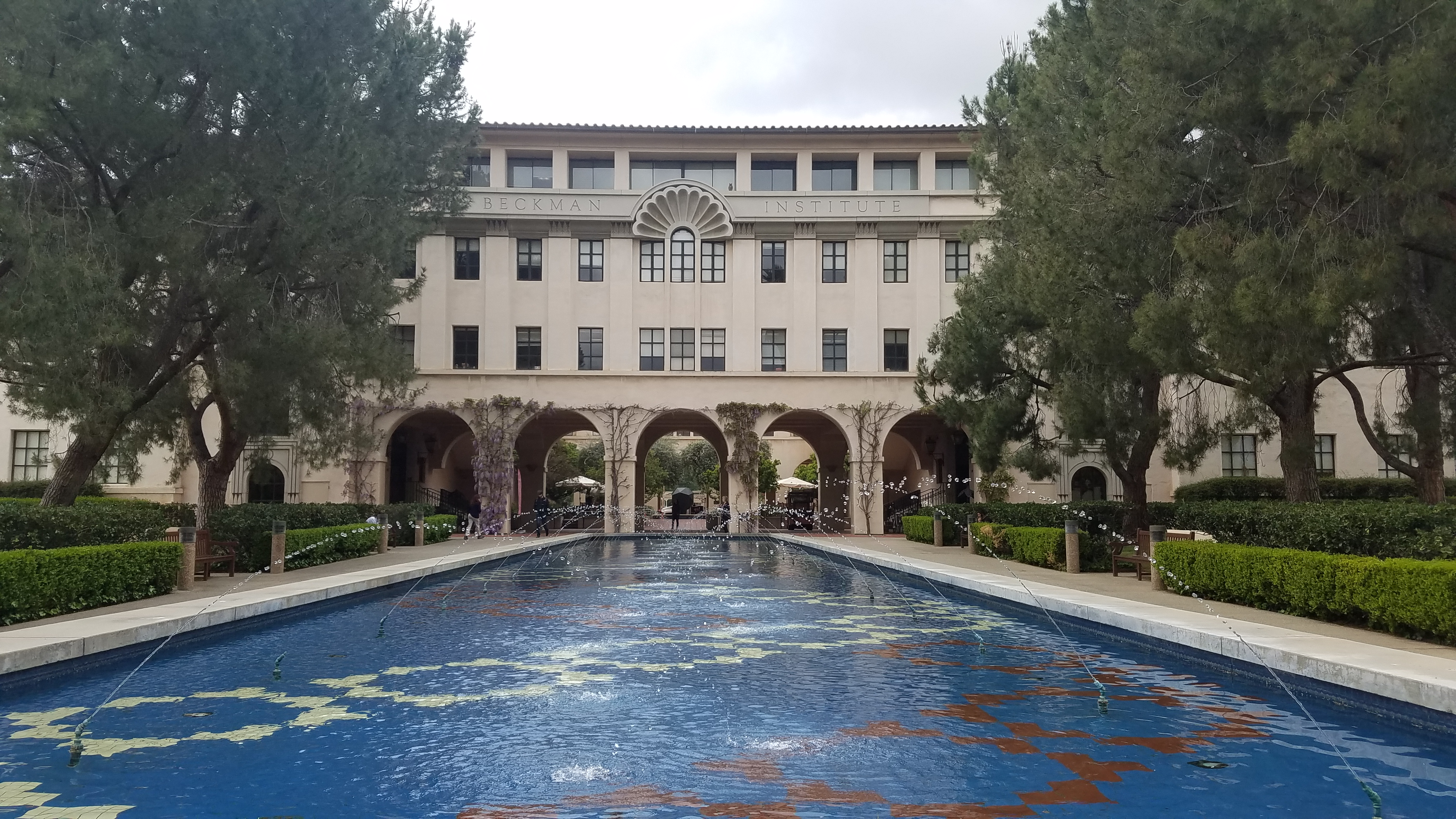
Beckman Institute at Caltech

The institute building was designed by architect Albert C. Martin, Jr. in a Spanish style with a pool and a central courtyard. It was dedicated on October 26, 1989, and opened in 1990. The building included four levels of laboratory space, libraries, and archives.

== Mission ==
The institute's mission was to foster innovative research in the chemical and biological sciences. A strong emphasis was placed on instrumentation, both in developing new research technologies, and in making facilities available to researchers across the university.

"The mission of the Beckman Institute is to invent methods, instrumentation and materials that will open new avenues for fundamental research in the chemical and biological sciences, and to provide technological support for these efforts." Beckman Institute Charter, 1987

== Organizational structure ==
External videos
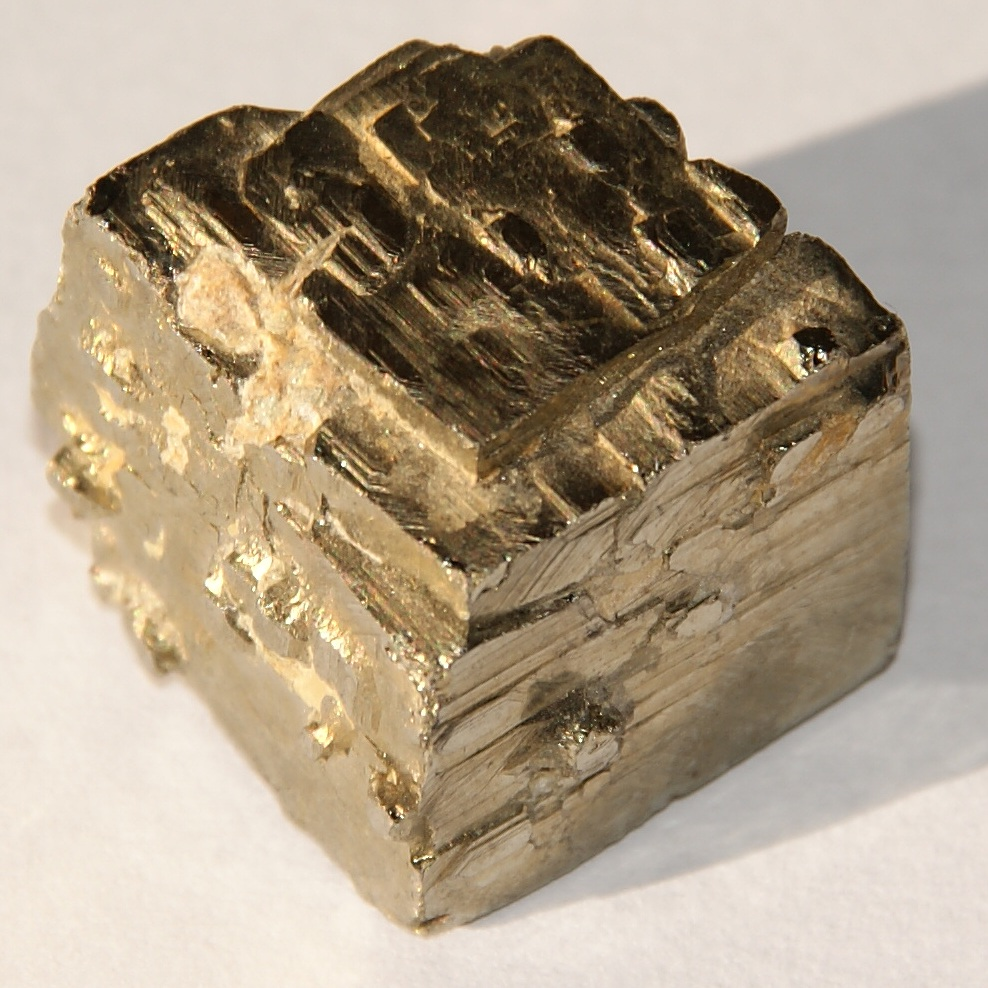
- Harry Gray, “Beckman Institute at Caltech - 2012”, Caltech

Four Caltech professors have served as directors of the Beckman Institute:

- Harry B. Gray, Arnold O. Beckman Professor of Chemistry (1986–2001)
- Barbara Wold, Bren Professor of Molecular Biology (2001–2012)
- David A. Tirrell, Ross McCollum-William H. Corcoran Professor of Chemistry and Chemical Engineering (2012–2018)
- Dennis A. Dougherty, George Grant Hoag Professor of Chemistry (2018–Present)

Within the institute were nine resource centers, each focusing on a different area of research. A tenth resource center has since been added. As of 2016, the resource centers and their principal investigators and directors were as follows:

- Center for Computational Regulatory Genomics: Eric H. Davidson, Principal investigator; R. Andrew Cameron, Director
- CLOVER (CLARITY, Optogenetics, and Vector Engineering Research Center): Viviana Gradinaru, principal investigator; Ben Deverman, director
- Functional Genomics Resource Center: Barbara Wold, principal investigator; Brian Williams, director
- Laser Resource Center: Harry B. Gray, principal investigator; Jay R. Winkler, director
- Mass Spectrometry Resource Center: Jack Beauchamp, principal investigator
- Molecular Materials Resource Center: Nate Lewis, principal investigator; Bruce S. Brunschwig, director
- Molecular Observatory: Douglas C. Rees, principal investigator; Jens Kaiser, director
- Programmable Molecular Technology Center: Niles Pierce, principal investigator; Harry M. T. Choi, director
- Proteome Exploration Lab: Raymond Deshaies, principal investigator; Sonja Hess, director
- Transmission Electron Microscopy: Grant Jensen, principal investigator; Alasdair McDowall, director
- Materials Process and Simulation Center: William A. Goddard III, principal investigator;
