= Jillian Lee Dempsey =

American inorganic chemist

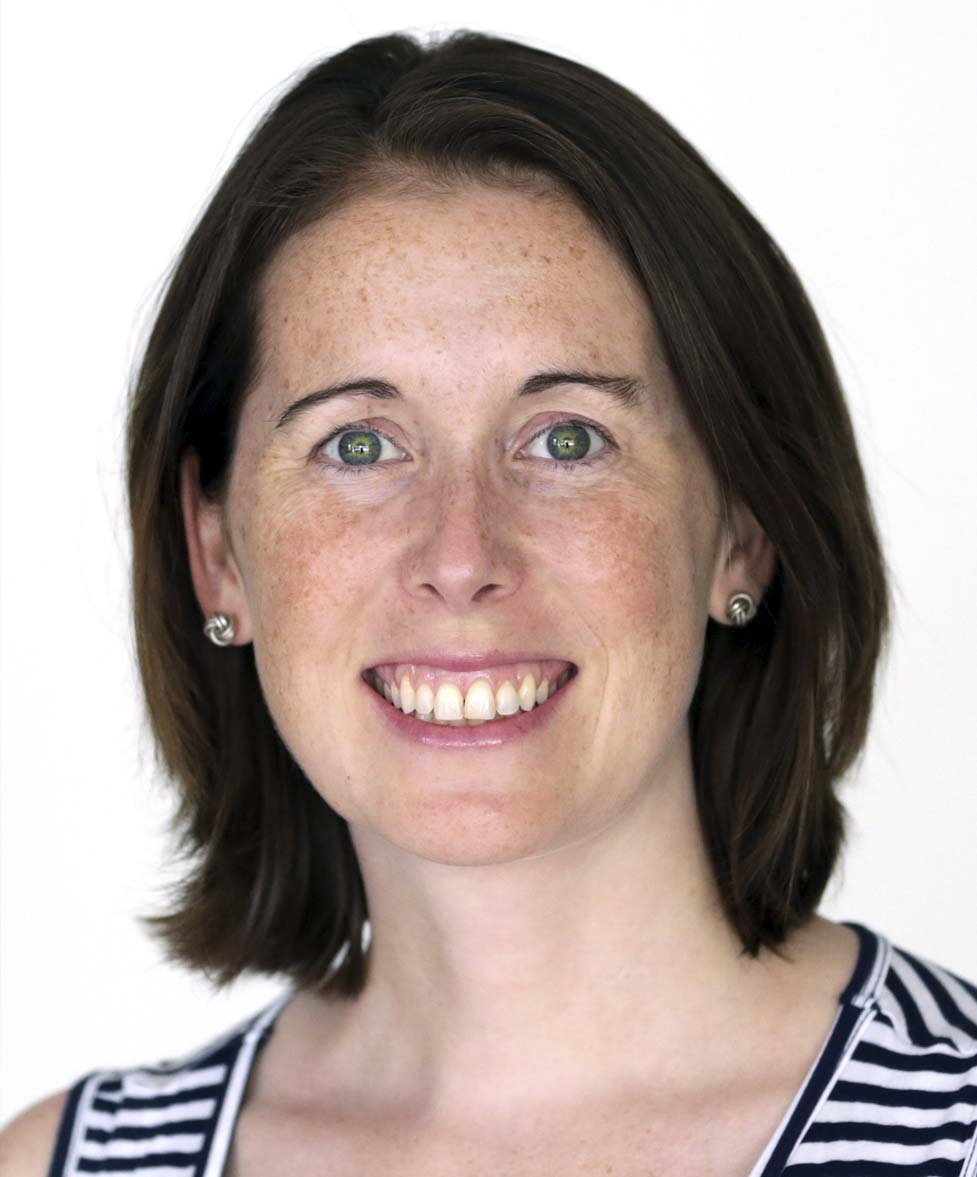
- Education: MIT (S.B.) (2005); Caltech (Ph.D.) (2010)
- Spouse: Alex J. M. Miller
- Scientific career
- Fields: Inorganic Chemistry, Photochemistry, Electrochemistry
- Workplaces: University of North Carolina at Chapel Hill
- Thesis: Hydrogen evolution catalyzed by cobaloximes (2010)
- Doctoral advisor: Harry B. Gray
- Other academic advisors: Daniel G. Nocera, Daniel R. Gamelin
- Website: chem.unc.edu/faculty/dempsey-jillian/

Jillian Lee Dempsey is an American inorganic chemist and the Bowman and Gordon Gray Distinguished Term Professor at the University of North Carolina at Chapel Hill. Currently, her work focuses on proton-coupled electron transfer, charge transfer events, and quantum dots. She is the recipient of numerous awards for rising stars of chemistry, including most recently a 2016 Alfred P. Sloan Research Fellowship and a 2016 Air Force's Young Investigator Research Program (YIP).

== Education and training ==
Dempsey attended the Massachusetts Institute of Technology for her undergraduate, earning her S.B. in Chemistry in 2005. She worked with Prof. Daniel G. Nocera on the development of molecular water splitting catalysts. While at MIT, she also worked at Merck Research Laboratories' Department of Analytical Research, on the development of HPLC columns for pharmaceutical process development. Dempsey then travelled to the California Institute of Technology for graduate studies, where she worked in the laboratory of Prof. Harry B. Gray and Jay R. Winkler. Dempsey's research at Caltech focused on elucidating the mechanism of hydrogen evolution for cobaloxime catalysts, as well as the reactivity of photogenerated osmium(II) complexes. She graduated with her Ph.D. in 2011.

From 2011 to 2012, Dempsey then conducted postdoctoral research as an NSF American Competitiveness in Chemistry Fellow in the laboratory of Daniel R. Gamelin at the University of Washington. There, she worked on photoconductive quantum dot thin films, as well as magnetic coupling in illuminated quantum dots.

== Independent career ==
Dempsey began her independent career at the University of North Carolina at Chapel Hill in 2012 as an assistant professor. She was granted tenure in 2018 and promoted to the rank of associate professor. Since 2020, she has served as the Bowman and Gordon Gray Distinguished Term Professor.

== Awards ==
- 2019 - American Chemical Society Harry Gray Award
- 2017 - Chemical & Engineering News Talented 12
- 2016 - Alfred P. Sloan Research Fellowship
- 2016 - Air Force's Young Investigator Research Program (YIP)
- 2015 - Packard Fellowship for Science and Engineering
- 2015 - NSF CAREER Award
