= 2,2'-Bis(2-indenyl) biphenyl =

2,2′-Bis(2-indenyl) biphenyl
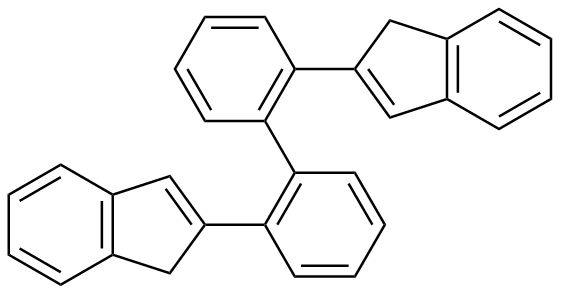

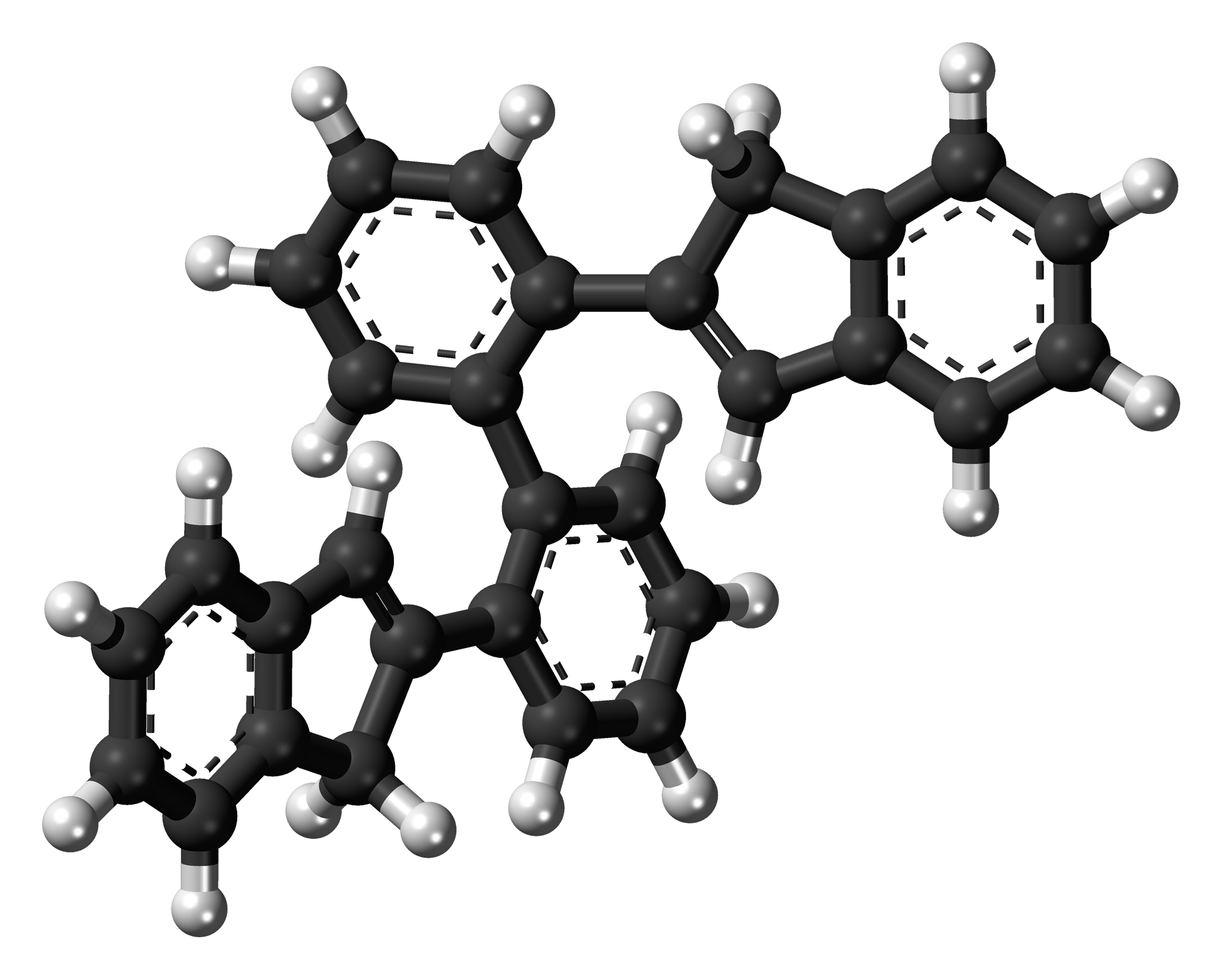

Names
- Preferred IUPAC name 2,2′-Di(1H-inden-2-yl)-1,1′-biphenyl

Identifiers
CAS Number	152952-99-3
3D model (JSmol)	Interactive image
ChemSpider	9318556
PubChem CID	11143444
UNII	ELS3QWP43C
CompTox Dashboard (EPA)	DTXSID20456782
- InChI: InChI=1S/C30H22/c1-2-10-22-18-25(17-21(22)9-1)27-13-5-7-15-29(27)30-16-8-6-14-28(30)26-19-23-11-3-4-12-24(23)20-26/h1-17,19H,18,20H2 Key: DGTWDUGCMACYFO-UHFFFAOYSA-N; InChI=1/C30H22/c1-2-10-22-18-25(17-21(22)9-1)27-13-5-7-15-29(27)30-16-8-6-14-28(30)26-19-23-11-3-4-12-24(23)20-26/h1-17,19H,18,20H2 Key: DGTWDUGCMACYFO-UHFFFAOYAR
- SMILES: C1(C2=C(C3=CC(C=CC=C5)=C5C3)C=CC=C2)=C(C4=CC(C=CC=C6)=C6C4)C=CC=C1

Properties
Chemical formula	C_{30}H_{22}
Molar mass	382.506 g·mol^{−1}
- Except where otherwise noted, data are given for materials in their standard state (at 25 °C [77 °F], 100 kPa). verify (what is ?) Infobox references

2,2′-Bis(2-indenyl) biphenyl is an organic compound with the formula [C_{6}H_{4}C_{9}H_{7}]_{2}. The compound is the precursor, upon deprotonation, to ansa-metallocene complexes within the area of transition metal indenyl complexes.

Metals studied with 2,2′-bis(2-indenyl) biphenyl include titanium, zirconium, and hafnium. The ligand and its complexes have been prepared by the research group of the late Brice Bosnich at The University of Chicago. Zirconium and hafnium complexes made from this ligand were found to be active catalysts for the polymerization of the smallest alkenes – compounds with carbon-carbon double bonds—namely, ethylene and propylene. The use of such complexes in the polymerization of alkenes has since been reported, and patented by DSM Research.
