= Fred Basolo =

American inorganic chemist

- Born: 11 February 1920; Coello, Illinois, U.S.
- Died: 27 February 2007 (aged 87); Skokie, Illinois, U.S.
- Education: University of Illinois PhD 1943
- Known for: coining the Indenyl effect
- Awards: Willard Gibbs Award (1996); Priestley Medal (2001); George Pimentel Award in Chemical Education (1992)
- Scientific career
- Fields: Inorganic chemistry
- Workplaces: Northwestern University
- Doctoral students: Harry B. Gray, Ken Raymond

Fred Basolo (11 February 1920 – 27 February 2007) was an American inorganic chemist. He received his Ph.D. at the University of Illinois at Urbana-Champaign in 1943, under Prof. John C. Bailar, Jr. Basolo spent his professional career at Northwestern University. He was a prolific contributor to the fields of coordination chemistry, organometallic, and bioinorganic chemistry, publishing over 400 papers. He supervised many Ph.D. students. With colleague Ralph Pearson, he co-authored the influential monograph "Mechanisms of Inorganic Reactions", which illuminated the importance of mechanisms involving coordination compounds. This work, which integrated concepts from ligand field theory and physical organic chemistry, signaled a shift from a highly descriptive nature of coordination chemistry to a more quantitative science.

== Biography ==
Giovanni Basolo and Catherina Morena Basolo immigrated from the Piedmont area of Italy to Illinois. They had three children there; the youngest was Alfredo Basolo (he began calling himself "Fred" when he entered elementary school). He was educated in the local public schools, then entered Southern Illinois Normal School (now Southern Illinois University, receiving his B.Ed. in 1940. He transferred to University of Illinois for graduate school, receiving his M.Ch in 1942 and his Ph.D. in Chemistry in 1943. He spent the remaining World War II years performing vital research at Rohm & Haas. In Fall 1946 he accepted a position as Instructor of Chemistry at Northwestern University at Evanston, Illinois. He tutored a first-year chemistry student, Mary Nutely that year. She ended up failing her chemistry class, but they were married on 14 June 1947. They eventually had four children (three daughters and a son, all of whom became educators as adults). The Basolo family spent 1954-55 in Europe thanks to a Guggenheim Grant. Basolo worked in the laboratory of Danish chemist Jannik Bjerrum; they were also able to tour several countries, including Italy, where they met his parents' relatives. Basolo advanced steadily through the academic ranks at NU: Instructor (1946–50); Assistant Professor (1950–55); Associated Professor (1955–58); Professor (1958–79); Distinguished Professor (1980-1990). He chaired the Chemistry Department from 1969 to 1972.

In 1997 he and his wife were in an automobile accident. She succumbed to her injuries on 5 February 1997; he had several surgeries to repair his back, but lost the use of his legs. For the last ten years of his life he used a motorized wheelchair for mobility. He died at the Midwest Palliative and Hospice Care Center in Skokie, Illinois of congestive heart failure.

== Publications ==
Among the many topics on which Basolo published were the indenyl effect, the reaction of coordinated ligands, and synthetic models for myoglobin.

His autobiography, From Coello to Inorganic Chemistry: A Lifetime of Reactions, was published in 2002.

== Honors and awards ==
A member of the National Academy of Sciences, Basolo was awarded the George Pimentel Award in Chemical Education.

- 1983 President of the American Chemical Society.
- 1983 The same year, he was elected a Fellow of the American Academy of Arts and Sciences.
- 1992 Chemical Pioneer Award from the American Institute of Chemists
- 1993 American Institute of Chemists Gold Medal.
- 2001 Priestley Medal
