= Harold Basch =

Professor of Chemistry (1940–2018)

- הרולד בש
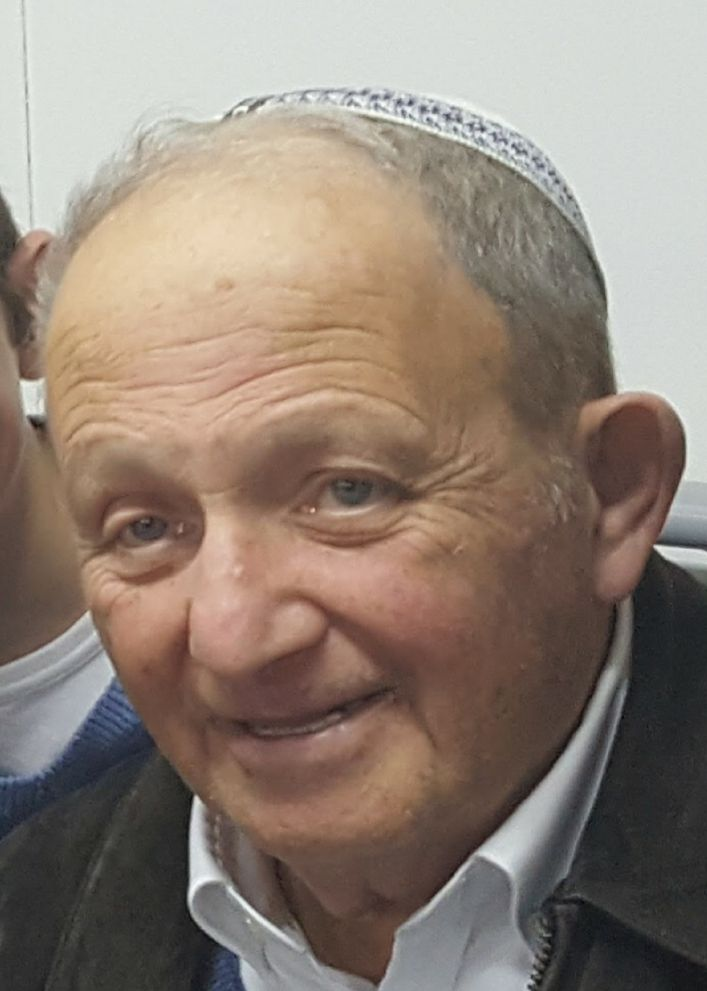
- Basch in 2017
- Born: 29 November 1940; The Bronx, New York City
- Died: 8 November 2018 (aged 77)
- Citizenship: Israeli
- Education: Yeshiva University; Columbia University
- Scientific career
- Fields: Computational chemistry
- Workplaces: Bar Ilan University
- Doctoral advisor: Harry B. Gray

Harold Basch (Hebrew: הרולד בש; 29 November 1940 – 8 November 2018) was a professor of chemistry who specialized in computational chemistry.

== Biography ==
Harold Basch was born in 1940 in the Bronx, New York City. He obtained his B.A. from Yeshiva University (1962) and his M.A. and Ph.D. from Columbia University (1966) under the supervision of Harry B. Gray. He did a postdoctoral research at Bell Telephone Laboratories (1966-1968) and was a principal research scientist at Ford Motor Company (Dearborn, Michigan) (1968–1971). In 1970 he joined the chemistry department at Bar-Ilan University (BIU) as an associate professor and became a full professor in 1977. He lived in Rehovot, was married to Julia and had 5 children.

== Administrative activities ==
His involvement in academic administration began early with an appointment as chairman of the department of chemistry at BIU (1973–1976). As an active member of the University's Senate, he served on and chaired many committees. Between the years 1988 and 1990, he served as the dean of the faculty of sciences and mathematics and held several tenures as a member of the executive board of the Senate. Among his others administrative activities, Basch served as the academic head of the Holon Institute of Technology (1978-1981), was a member of the Council for Higher Education in Israel (1985–1991), served on scientific grants committees of the Israel Science Foundation, was a member of the scientific board of the Israel Inter-University Computation Center, was appointed to the National Council for Research and Development (Prime Minister's Office) and was a member of the computer grants committee of The Planning and Budgeting Committee (PBC). During the years 2005–2011, he served as the vice president for research at Bar-Ilan University.

== Scientific activities ==
His main research interest was in the field of computational chemistry. Basch was a pioneer in computational quantum chemistry, in developing methods and innovative applications of theoretical concepts and equations to solving problems in chemistry. Already in 1962, as a beginning graduate student at Columbia University, he recognized the potential use of the computer (which then filled a whole building), in chemical research. The methods and paradigms he developed are used today in modern software packages for the calculation of molecular properties. The list of applications he has been involved in include electron, electronic and photoelectronic spectroscopies, energetics, geometric and electronic structures, chemical reaction paths, intermediates, and transition states, metal-ligand, metal-metal, metal cluster bonding, and active site reactions in metalloenzymes. The theoretical methods include single and multi-configuration molecular orbital theory, valence bond theory, and effective core and effective fragment potentials. His latest research efforts were directed towards finding appropriate molecular bridges that can serve as nano-conducting and switching elements in molecular electronics.

During his career, Basch published more than 180 papers and book chapters.
