= Transition metal indenyl complex =

In organometallic chemistry, a transition metal indenyl complex is a coordination compound that contains one or more indenyl ligands. The indenyl ligand is formally the anion derived from deprotonation of indene. The η^{5}-indenyl ligand is related to the η^{5}cyclopentadienyl anion (Cp), thus indenyl analogues of many cyclopentadienyl complexes are known. Indenyl ligands lack the 5-fold symmetry of Cp, so they exhibit more complicated geometries. Furthermore, some indenyl complexes also exist with only η^{3}-bonding mode. The η^{5}- and η^{3}-bonding modes sometimes interconvert.

== Synthesis ==
The first indenyl complexes were described by Pauson and Wilkinson in the form of analogues of ferrocene and cobaltocenium cation. They used indenyl lithium and the ferric chloride and cobaltous chloride respectively. They found that the cobalt derivative is a poorer reductant than cobaltocene. In more modern times, indenyl lithium is prepared by deprotonation of indene by butyl lithium. In this way, the complexes have been prepared:

C_{9}H_{8} + BuLi → C_{9}H_{7}Li + BuH
C_{9}H_{7}Li + MCl_{4} → C_{9}H_{7}MCl_{3} + LiCl (M = Ti, Zr, Hf)

When the metal halide is easily reduced, the trimethylstannylindenyl can be used instead of indenyl lithium:

Me_{3}SnC_{9}H_{7} + TiCl_{4} → Me_{3}SnCl + C_{9}H_{7}TiCl_{3}

Akin to the organometallic chemistry of cyclopentadiene, indene reacts directly with some metal carbonyls to give indenyl derivatives. For example, heating molybdenum hexacarbonyl with indene in a hydrocarbon solvent gives the dimeric indenyl complex:

2 C_{9}H_{8} + 2 Mo(CO)_{6} → [(C_{9}H_{7})Mo(CO)_{3}]_{2} + H_{2} + 6 CO

[(C_{9}H_{7})Mo(CO)_{3}]_{2}, which is structurally related to cyclopentadienylmolybdenum tricarbonyl dimer, was instrumental Mawby et al.'s discovery of the indenyl effect.

== Structure ==
The M-C distances in indenyl complexes are comparable to those in cyclopentadienyl complexes. For the metallocenes M(Ind)_{2}, ring slipping is evident for the case of M = Co and especially Ni, but not for M = Fe. A number of chelating or ansa-bis(indenyl complexes are known, such as those derived from 2,2'-bis(2-indenyl) biphenyl

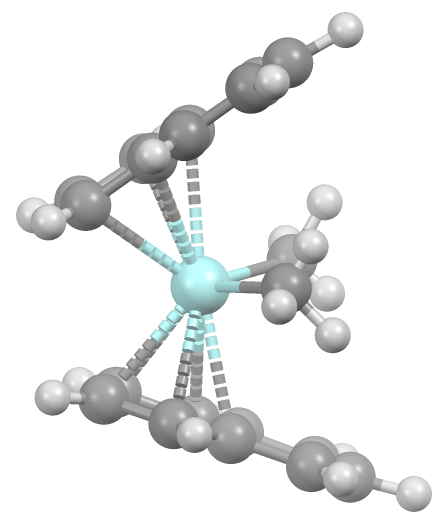
side view of (indenyl)_{2}ZrMe_{2}

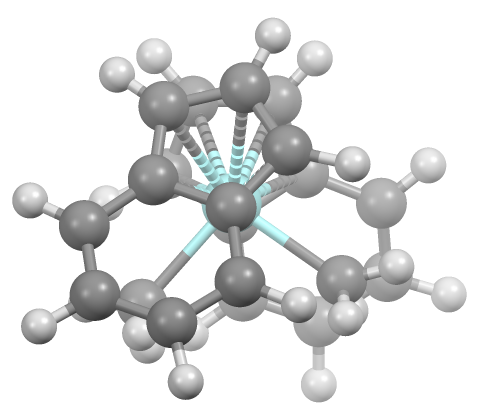
Top view of (indenyl)_{2}ZrMe_{2}

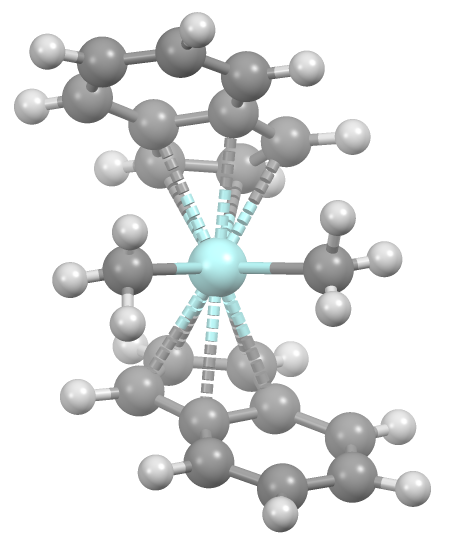
View of (indenyl)_{2}ZrMe_{2} down C_{2} symmetry axis.

== Reactivity ==
=== As polymerization catalysts ===
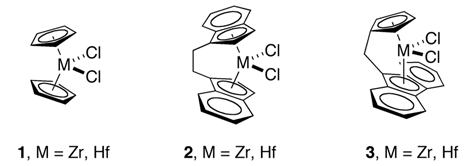
Metallocene dichloride 1, containing two Cp ligands (C_{2v} symmetry), a related complex bis(indenyl) complex 2 (C_{2} symmetry), and a mixed Cp-fluorenyl complex 3 (C_{s} symmetry). Such compounds are precursors to Ziegler–Natta catalysts.

Zirconium indenyl complexes have emerged as highly efficient catalysts for the stereospecific polymerization of polypropylene. This property is a consequence of the behavior of species such as (indenyl)_{2}Zr(CH_{3})_{2}. Some Lewis acids convert such dialkyl species into the equivalent of [(indenyl)_{2}ZrCH_{3}]^{+}, which actively polymerizes alkenes.

=== Indenyl effect ===
The indenyl effect refers to an explanation for the enhanced rates of substitution exhibited by η^{5}-indenyl complexes vs the related η^{5}-cyclopentadienyl complexes. The effect was discovered by Hart-Davis and Mawby in 1969 through studies on the conversion of (η^{5}-C_{9}H_{7})Mo(CO)_{3}CH_{3} to the phosphine-substituted acetyl complex, which follows bimolecular kinetics. This rate law was attributed to the haptotropic rearrangement of the indenyl ligand from η^{5} to η^{3}. The corresponding reaction of tributylphosphine with (η^{5}-C_{5}H_{5})Mo(CO)_{3}CH_{3} was 10 x slower.

Subsequent work by Hart-Davis, Mawby, and White compared CO substitution by phosphines in Mo(η^{5}-C_{9}H_{7})(CO)_{3}X and Mo(η^{5}-C_{5}H_{5})(CO)_{3}X (X = Cl, Br, I) and found the cyclopentadienyl compounds to substitute by an S_{N}1 pathway and the indenyl compounds to substitute by both S_{N}1 and S_{N}2 pathways. Mawby and Jones later studied the rate of CO substitution with P(OEt)_{3} with Fe(η^{5}-C_{9}H_{7})(CO)_{2}I and Fe(η^{5}-C_{5}H_{5})(CO)_{2}I and found that both occur by an S_{N}1 pathway with the indenyl substitution occurring about 575 times faster. Hydrogenation of the arene ring in the indenyl ligand resulted in CO substitution at about half the rate of the cyclopentadienyl compound.

A related S_{N}2 pathway was observed for substitution of CO in Rh(η^{5}-C_{9}H_{7})(CO)_{2}, which is 10^{8} times faster than in Rh(η^{5}-C_{5}H_{5})(CO)_{2}. Shortly afterwards, the effect of the indenyl ligand on Mn(η^{5}-C_{9}H_{7})(CO)_{3}, the cyclopentadienyl analogue of which having been shown to be inert to CO substitution. Mn(η^{5}-C_{9}H_{7})(CO)_{3} did undergo CO loss and was found to substitute via an S_{N}2 mechanism. The term indenyl effect was coined by Fred Basolo.

Associative substitution occurs by the addition of a ligand to a metal complex followed by dissociation of an original ligand. Associative pathways are not typically seen in 18-electron complexes due to the requisite intermediates having more than 18 electrons associated with the metal atom. 18 electron indenyl complexes; however, have been shown to undergo substitution via associative pathways quite readily. This is attributed to the relative ease of η^{5} to η^{3} rearrangement due to stabilization by the arene. This stabilization is responsible for substitution rate enhancements of about 10^{8} for the substitution of indenyl complexes compared to the corresponding cyclopentadienyl complex.

Kinetic data support two proposed mechanisms for associative ligand substitution. The first mechanism, proposed by Hart-Davis and Mawby, is a concerted attack by the nucleophile and η^{5} to η^{3} transition followed by loss of a ligand and a η^{3} to η^{5} transition.

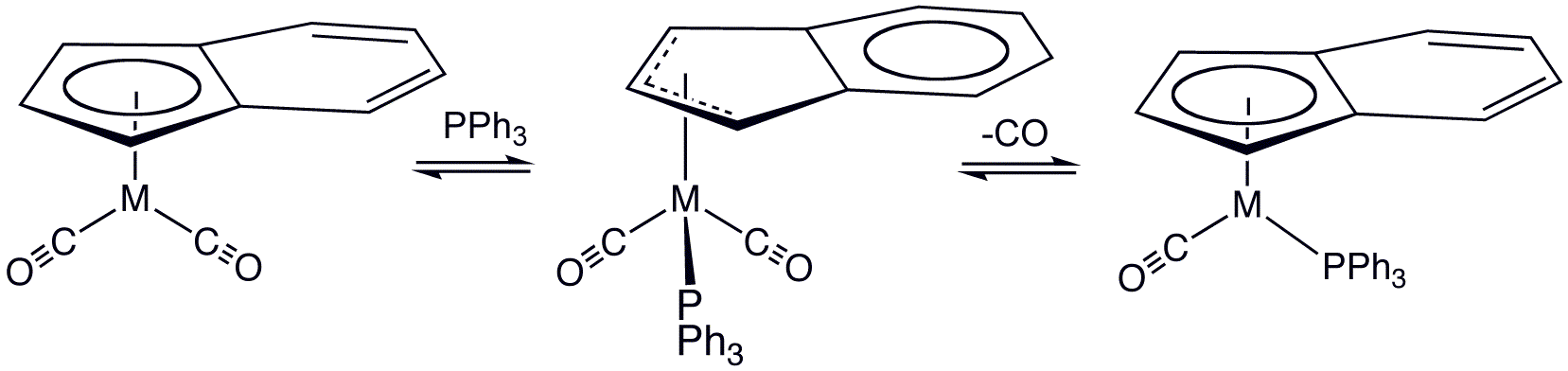
One mechanism proposed for substitution of (indenyl)M(CO)_{2} by triphenylphosphine.

In a mechanism proposed by Basolo, η^{5} and η^{3} isomers exist in rapid chemical equilibrium. The rate-limiting step occurs with the attack of the nucleophile on a η^{3} isomer. The nature of the substituents of the allyl group can strongly affect the kinetics and regiochemistry of the nucleophilic attack.

The indenyl effect was discovered by Hart-Davis and Mawby in 1969 through studies on the conversion of (η^{5}-C_{9}H_{7})Mo(CO)_{3}CH_{3} to the phosphine-substituted acetyl complex, which follows bimolecular kinetics. This rate law was attributed to the haptotropic rearrangement of the indenyl ligand from η^{5} to η^{3}. The corresponding reaction of tributylphosphine with (η^{5}-C_{5}H_{5})Mo(CO)_{3}CH_{3} was 10 x slower. The term indenyl effect was coined by Fred Basolo.

== Fluorenyl complexes ==
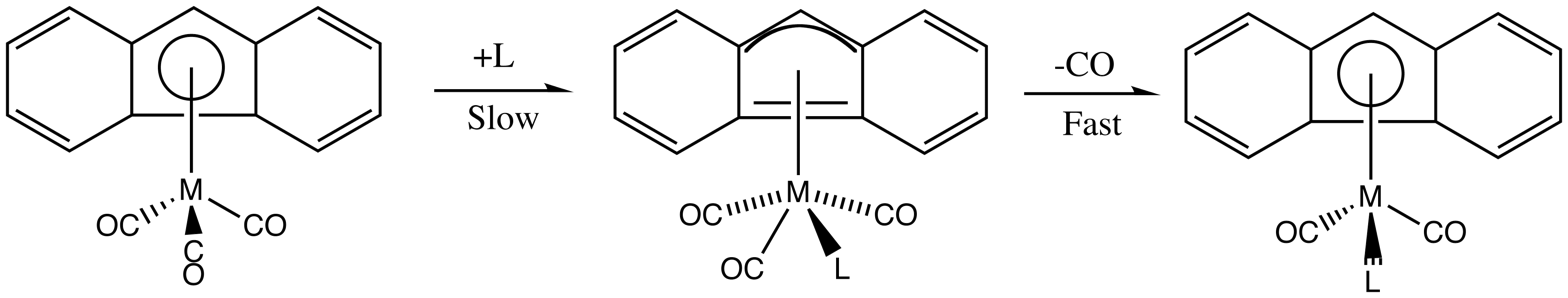
Mechanism for ligand substitution in Fluorenyl substituted metals.

Fluorenyl is related to indenyl and its complexes also exhibit the indenyl effect. In fluorenyl complexes, associative substitution is enhanced even further than indenyl compounds. The substitution rate of Mn(η^{5}-C_{13}H_{9})(CO)_{3} is about 60 times faster than that of Mn(η^{5}-C_{9}H_{7})(CO)_{3}The rate of substitution on [(η^{5}-X)Mn(CO)_{3}] where X is cyclopentadienyl, indenyl, fluorenyl, cyclohexadienyl, and 1-hydronaphthalene. Unsurprisingly, it was found that the ease of η^{5} to η^{3} haptotropic shift correlated to the strength of the Mn-X bond.

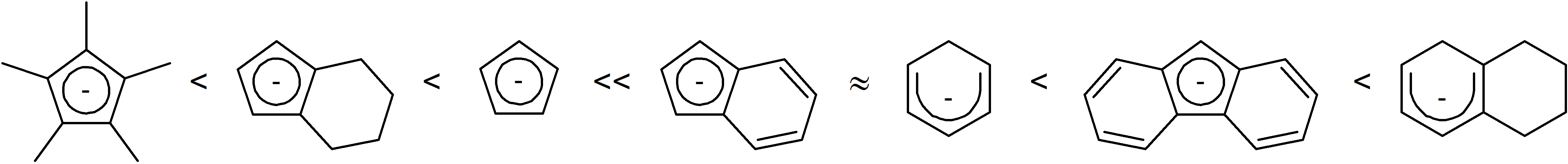
General trend for haptotropic rearrangement assisted ligand substitution.
