= Kristi Kiick =

American chemical engineer (1967–2026)

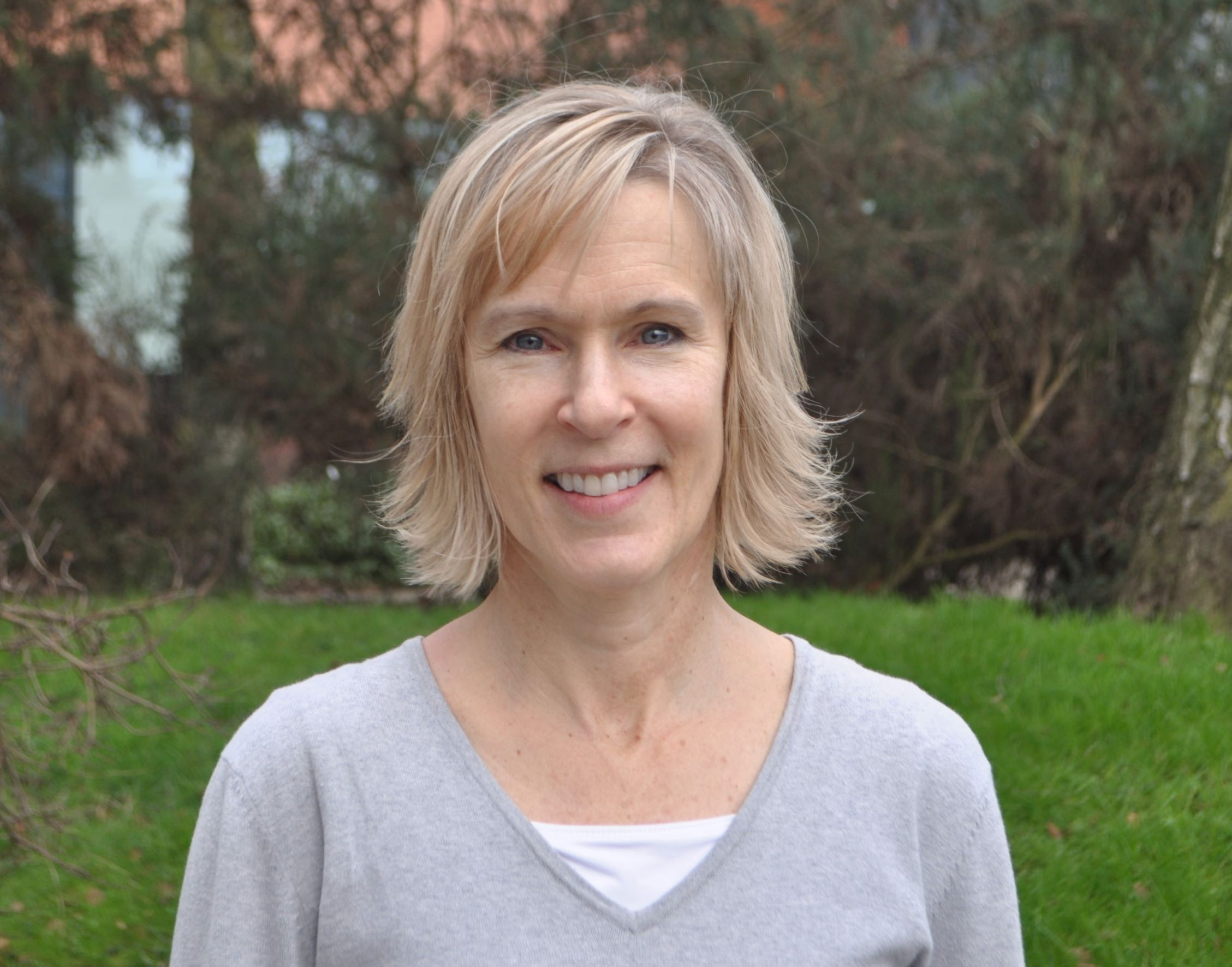
- Kiick at the University of York in 2020
- Born: Kristi Lynn Kiick; May 19, 1967; Easton, Pennsylvania, U.S.
- Died: January 2, 2026 (aged 58); Rising Sun, Maryland, U.S.
- Education: University of Delaware (BS); University of Georgia (MS); University of Massachusetts Amherst (MS, PhD)
- Awards: National Science Foundation CAREER Award (2003); Fulbright Scholar (2019)
- Scientific career
- Fields: Biomaterials
- Workplaces: University of Delaware
- Thesis: Expanding the scope of templated macromolecular synthesis in vivo: The incorporation of methionine analogues into proteins in vivo by altering the methionyl-tRNA synthetase activity of a bacterial expression host (2001)
- Doctoral advisor: David A. Tirrell
- Website: sites.udel.edu/kiickgroup

Kristi Lynn Kiick (May 19, 1967 – January 2, 2026) was an American academic who was the Blue and Gold Distinguished Professor of Materials Science and Engineering at the University of Delaware. She studied polymers, biomaterials and hydrogels for drug delivery and regenerative medicine. She was a Fellow of the American Chemical Society, the American Institute for Medical and Biological Engineering, and of the National Academy of Inventors. She served for nearly eight years as the deputy dean of the college of engineering at the University of Delaware.

== Early life and education ==
Kristi Kiick was born in Easton, Pennsylvania, on May 19, 1967. She first became interested in a career in the chemical sciences when she was at high school. She studied chemistry at the University of Delaware, from which she graduated summa cum laude as a Eugene du Pont memorial distinguished scholar. She was a Master's student at the University of Georgia, where she was awarded a National Science Foundation (NSF) predoctoral fellowship, and joined Kimberly-Clark as a research scientist in 1992. Kiick returned to academia for a second master's degree in polymer science and engineering at the University of Massachusetts Amherst. She completed her doctoral research at the California Institute of Technology, as a National Defense Science and Engineering Graduate (NDSEG) fellow. She completed her PhD from the University of Massachusetts Amherst on templated macromolecular synthesis in 2001 under the supervision of David A. Tirrell, prior to starting her faculty position at the University of Delaware in 2001.

== Research and career ==
Kiick designed polymer nanostructures for targeted therapies and hydrogel matrices for regenerative medicine. She made use of biomimetic self-assembly, bioconjugation and biosynthesis. In particular, Kiick worked on polymer-peptide macromolecular structures that can engage cellular targets. These include the use of polyethylene glycol (PEG) in click chemistry to form hydrogels that degrade selectively in response to molecules present in tissues and extracellular matrix. Kiick showed that it is possible to selectively release small molecule cargo with a tuned release for applications in targeted drug-delivery and vascular grafts. She developed resilin-like polypeptides (RLP), elastomeric materials that can be cross-linked using small molecules, as well as hydrogels that contain nanoparticles for targeting tumors and inflammatory conditions. Resilin is a primary elastomeric protein that is found in insects, and helps them to jump long distances and produce sound.

She joined the faculty at the University of Delaware in 2001 and earned the rank of associate professor in 2007. In 2011, Kiick was promoted to the rank of professor of materials science and engineering and also named deputy dean of the University of Delaware’s college of engineering. In 2019–2020, she was awarded a Leverhulme Visiting Professorship from the Leverhulme Trust and a Fulbright Scholarship from the Fulbright Program to the University of Nottingham, to develop protocols for fabricating bioelastomeric materials.

== Personal life and death ==
Kiick was married with two children. She died on January 2, 2026, at the age of 58 after a battle with leiomyosarcoma.

After retiring from the University of Delaware, Kiick worked to establish funding for a UD College of Engineering program supporting science education outreach. Entitled the Kristi Kiick Engineering Education Ecosystem (E3) Support Fund, the fund remains active and continues to accept contributions in her memory.

=== Awards and honours ===
Her awards and honours include:

- 2003 National Science Foundation CAREER Award
- 2004 University of Delaware Francis Alison Young Scholar Award
- 2010 University of Minnesota Etter Memorial Lectureship in Chemistry
- 2012 University of Delaware Trabant Award for Women's Equity
- 2014 University of Southern Mississippi Bayer Distinguished Lectureship
- 2014 Elected a fellow of the American Chemical Society (ACS)
- 2014 Elected a fellow of the American Institute for Medical and Biological Engineering (AIMBE)
- 2015 University of Southern Mississippi Covestro Distinguished Lectureship
- 2019 Fulbright Program Scholar
- 2019 Elected a fellow of the National Academy of Inventors
- 2024 University of Delaware Medal of Distinction

=== Selected publications ===
Her publications include:

- Kiick, K. L.; Saxon, E.; Tirrell, D. A.; Bertozzi, C. R. (January 8, 2002). "Incorporation of azides into recombinant proteins for chemoselective modification by the Staudinger ligation". Proceedings of the National Academy of Sciences. 99 (1): 19–24. Bibcode:2002PNAS...99...19K. doi:10.1073/pnas.012583299. ISSN 0027-8424. PMC 117506. PMID 11752401.
- Kharkar, Prathamesh M.; Kiick, Kristi L.; Kloxin, April M. (August 5, 2013). "Designing degradable hydrogels for orthogonal control of cell microenvironments". Chemical Society Reviews. 42 (17): 7335–7372. doi:10.1039/C3CS60040H. ISSN 1460-4744. PMC 3762890. PMID 23609001.
- Baldwin, Aaron D.; Kiick, Kristi L. (October 19, 2011). "Tunable Degradation of Maleimide–Thiol Adducts in Reducing Environments". Bioconjugate Chemistry. 22 (10): 1946–1953. doi:10.1021/bc200148v. ISSN 1043-1802. PMC 3220410. PMID 21863904.
