= Dianne Newman =

American microbiologist

- Born: 1971 (age 54–55)
- Education: Massachusetts Institute of Technology
- Known for: microbiology
- Awards: NAS Award in Molecular Biology (2016); MacArthur Fellowship (2016)
- Scientific career
- Workplaces: California Institute of Technology
- Thesis: Microbial respiration and precipitation of arsenic (1998)
- Doctoral advisor: Francois Morel
- Doctoral students: Tracy Teal
- Website: dknweb.caltech.edu

Dianne Newman is a molecular microbiologist, a professor in the Division of Biology and Biological Engineering and the Division of Geological and Planetary Sciences at California Institute of Technology. Her research interests include bioenergetics and cell biology of metabolically diverse, genetically-tractable bacteria. Her work deals with electron-transfer reactions that are part of the metabolism of microorganisms.

She was awarded the National Academy of Sciences (NAS) Award in Molecular Biology for her "discovery of microbial mechanisms underlying geologic processes." The award citation recognizes her for "launching the field of molecular geomicrobiology" and fostering greater awareness of the important roles microorganisms have played and continue to play in how Earth evolved. In 2025, she was elected to the American Philosophical Society.

She was one of the recipients of the 2016 MacArthur Fellowships. She was elected to the National Academy of Sciences in 2019.

== Early life and education ==
Newman lived overseas during her childhood and attended West Potomac High School in Fairfax County, Virginia, where she entered science fairs, winning second place in physics at the International Science and Engineering Fair in 1987. She received her BA from Stanford University in 1993 and received her Ph.D. under Francois Morel at Massachusetts Institute of Technology in 1997. She was a postdoctoral fellow under Roberto Kolter at Harvard Medical School (1998–2000). In 1999, she was named one of the Top Innovators Under 35 by the MIT Technology Review, and she joined the faculty at the California Institute of Technology in 2000.

== Career and research ==
She was the Wilson Professor of Geobiology at the Massachusetts Institute of Technology from 2007 to 2010, prior to returning to Caltech, where she is currently the Gordon M. Binder/Amgen Professor of Biology and Geobiology in the Divisions of Biology and Biological Engineering and Geological and Planetary Sciences. Newman's scientific articles have appeared in such journals as Proceedings of the National Academy of Sciences, Geobiology, Nature, and Science.

Her laboratory at Caltech is interested in the co-evolution of life and Earth. Specifically, they take an interdisciplinary approach to studying the molecular mechanisms that underlie ancient forms of metabolism. By understanding the way extant organisms function at the molecular level, they hope eventually to gain insights into the evolution of ancient metabolic and biomineralization pathways, interpret the chemical signatures of early life found in the geologic record, and understand how multicellular bacterial communities survive in the context of infection, particularly the mucus-filled lungs of individuals living with cystic fibrosis.

== Awards and recognition ==
- Fellow of MacArthur Fellows Program, 2016
- NAS Award in Molecular Biology, 2016
- Harvey Lecture, 2018
- Elected Member, National Academy of Sciences, 2019
