= Harry B. Gray =

American inorganic chemist

Harry Gray
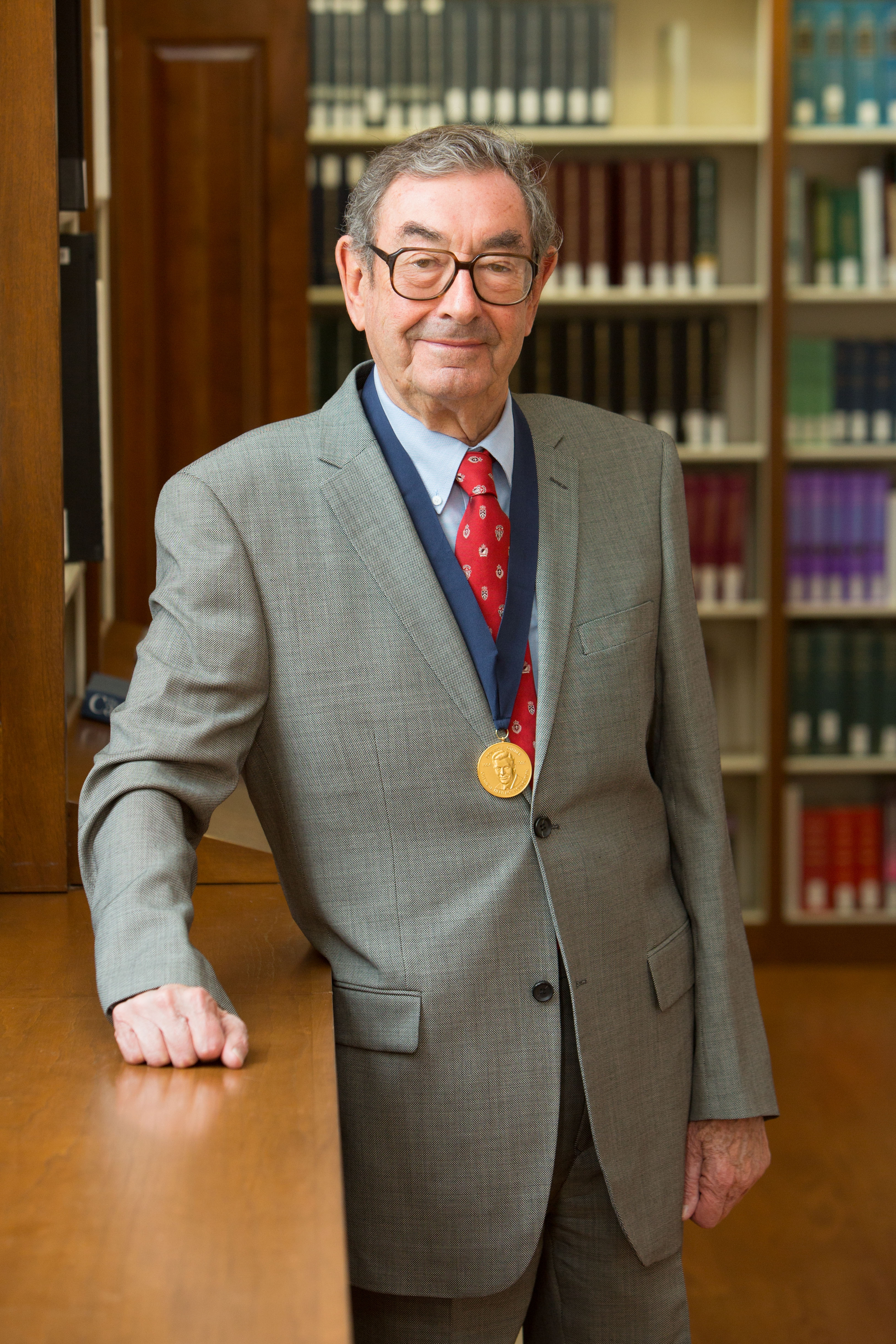
- Gray in 2013
- Born: Harry Barkus Gray; November 14, 1935 (age 90); Woodburn, Kentucky, U.S.
- Education: Western Kentucky University (BS); Northwestern University (PhD)
- Known for: Bioinorganic Chemistry; Electron Transfer; Photochemistry
- Awards: ACS Award in Pure Chemistry (1970); Tolman Award (1979); National Medal of Science (1986); AIC Gold Medal (1990); Priestley Medal (1991); Harvey Prize (2000); William H. Nichols Medal (2003); Wolf Prize in Chemistry (2004); Welch Award (2009); Othmer Gold Medal (2013)
- Scientific career
- Fields: Chemistry
- Workplaces: Columbia University; California Institute of Technology
- Doctoral advisor: Fred Basolo, Ralph Pearson
- Doctoral students: Harold Basch; Jillian L. Dempsey; David M. Dooley; Gregory L. Geoffroy; Stephen L. Mayo; Daniel G. Nocera; Holden Thorp; Jay R. Winkler; Mark S. Wrighton
- Other notable students: Undergrads: Nathan Lewis; Liviu Mirica; Christopher Chang; Post-docs: Mahdi Abu-Omar; Alison Butler; Che Chi-ming; Mark W. Grinstaff; Hemamala Karunadasa; Charles M. Lieber; Edward I. Solomon; Jonathan Wilker
- Website: www.cce.caltech.edu/content/harry-b-gray

External videos
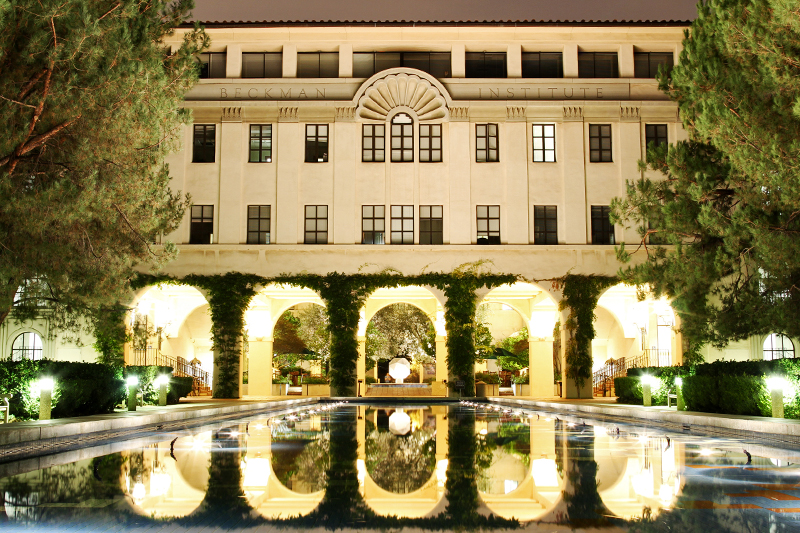
- Harry Gray discusses How Arnold O. Beckman's Instrumental Voice Shaped Chemistry's History, and the Beckman Institute at Caltech; Profiles in Chemistry, Chemical Heritage Foundation

Harry Barkus Gray (born November 14, 1935) is the Arnold O. Beckman Professor of Chemistry at California Institute of Technology.

== Career ==
Gray received his B.S. in chemistry from Western Kentucky University in 1957. He began his work in inorganic chemistry at Northwestern University, where he earned his Ph.D. in 1960 working under Fred Basolo and Ralph Pearson. He was initiated into the Upsilon chapter of Alpha Chi Sigma at Northwestern University in 1958. After that, he spent a year (1960–61) as an NSF Postdoctoral Fellow at the University of Copenhagen, where, along with Walter A. Manch, he collaborated with Carl J. Ballhausen on studies of the electronic structures of metal complexes.

After completing his NSF Postdoctoral Fellowship at the University of Copenhagen, he relocated to New York City to take up a faculty appointment at Columbia University. He served as an assistant professor from 1961 to 1963 and as an associate professor from 1963 to 1965.

In 1966, he became the Arnold O. Beckman Professor of Chemistry at California Institute of Technology, and founding director of the Beckman Institute. He also served on the Physical Sciences jury for the Infosys Prize from 2010 to 2013.

Gray also trained future leaders of several major science research universities. Four of his doctoral students became presidents or chancellors: David M. Dooley at University of Rhode Island, Gregory L. Geoffroy at Iowa State University, Holden Thorp at University of North Carolina at Chapel Hill, and Mark Wrighton at Washington University in St. Louis.

== Research ==
Gray's interdisciplinary research program addresses a wide range of fundamental problems in inorganic chemistry, biochemistry, and biophysics. Electron transfer (ET) chemistry is a unifying theme for much of this research.

Over the past twenty-five years the Gray group has been measuring the kinetics of long-range ET reactions in metalloproteins labeled with inorganic redox reagents. Early research by his lab members showed that details of the internal structures of the proteins dominate the ET rates. Current research is aimed at understanding how intermediate protein radicals accelerate long-range ET. In collaboration with Jay R. Winkler of the Beckman Institute at Caltech they have developed new techniques for measuring ET rates in crystals of Ru-, Os-, and Re-modified azurins, as well as crystals of Fe(III)-cytochrome c doped with Zn(II)-cytochrome c. This method of integrating photosensitizers into protein crystals has provided a powerful new tool for studying biochemical reaction dynamics. The Gray/Winkler group is also using ET chemistry to probe the dynamics of protein folding in cytochrome c.

=== Major publications ===
- Ponce, Adrian; Gray, Harry B.; Winkler, Jay R. (August 2000). "Electron Tunneling through Water: Oxidative Quenching of Electronically Excited Ru(tpy) (tpy = 2,2':6,2' '-terpyridine) by Ferric Ions in Aqueous Glasses at 77 K" (PDF). Journal of the American Chemical Society. 122 (34): 8187–8191. Bibcode:2000JAChS.122.8187P. doi:10.1021/ja000017h.
- Babini, Elena; Bertini, Ivano; Borsari, Marco; Capozzi, Francesco; Luchinat, Claudio; Zhang, Xiaoyu; Moura, Gustavo L. C.; Kurnikov, Igor V.; Beratan, David N.; Ponce, Adrian; Di Bilio, Angel J.; Winkler, Jay R.; Gray, Harry B. (May 2000). "Bond-Mediated Electron Tunneling in Ruthenium-Modified High-Potential Iron−Sulfur Protein" (PDF). Journal of the American Chemical Society. 122 (18): 4532–4533. Bibcode:2000JAChS.122.4532B. doi:10.1021/ja994472t.
- Winkler, J. R.; Di Bilio, Angel J.; Farrow, N. A.; Richards, J. H.; Gray, H. B. (January 1, 1999). "Electron tunneling in biological molecules". Pure and Applied Chemistry. 71 (9): 1753–1764. doi:10.1351/pac199971091753.
- Dmochowski, I. J.; Crane, B. R.; Wilker, J. J.; Winkler, J. R.; Gray, H. B. (November 9, 1999). "Optical detection of cytochrome P450 by sensitizer-linked substrates". Proceedings of the National Academy of Sciences. 96 (23): 12987–12990. Bibcode:1999PNAS...9612987D. doi:10.1073/pnas.96.23.12987. PMC 23886. PMID 10557259.
- Wilker, Jonathan J.; Dmochowski, Ivan J.; Dawson, John H.; Winkler, Jay R.; Gray, Harry B. (January 15, 1999). "Substrates for Rapid Delivery of Electrons and Holes to Buried Active Sites in Proteins". Angewandte Chemie International Edition. 38 (1–2): 89–92. doi:10.1002/(SICI)1521-3773(19990115)38:1/2<89::AID-ANIE89>3.0.CO;2-R.
- Telford, Jason R.; Wittung-Stafshede, Pernilla; Gray, Harry B.; Winkler, Jay R. (November 1998). "Protein Folding Triggered by Electron Transfer". Accounts of Chemical Research. 31 (11): 755–763. doi:10.1021/ar970078t.
- Gray, Harry B.; Winkler, Jay R. (June 1996). "Electron Transfer in Proteins" (PDF). Annual Review of Biochemistry. 65 (1): 537–561. doi:10.1146/annurev.bi.65.070196.002541. PMID 8811189. S2CID 18469372.
- Pascher, T.; Chesick, J. P.; Winkler, J. R.; Gray, H. B. (March 15, 1996). "Protein Folding Triggered by Electron Transfer". Science. 271 (5255): 1558–1560. Bibcode:1996Sci...271.1558P. doi:10.1126/science.271.5255.1558. PMID 8599112. S2CID 24879221.
- Langen, R; Chang, I.; Germanas, J.; Richards, J.; Winkler; Gray, H. (June 23, 1995). "Electron tunneling in proteins: coupling through a beta strand". Science. 268 (5218): 1733–1735. Bibcode:1995Sci...268.1733L. doi:10.1126/science.7792598. PMID 7792598.
- Grinstaff, M.; Hill, M.; Labinger, J.; Gray, H. (May 27, 1994). "Mechanism of catalytic oxygenation of alkanes by halogenated iron porphyrins". Science. 264 (5163): 1311–1313. Bibcode:1994Sci...264.1311G. doi:10.1126/science.8191283. PMID 8191283.

== Awards and honors ==
His accolades include:

- 1970 ACS Award in Pure Chemistry
- 1979 Tolman Award
- 1986 National Medal of Science
- 1990 AIC Gold Medal
- 1992 Priestley Medal
- 2000 Harvey Prize
- 2000 Foreign Member of the Royal Society
- 2004 The Benjamin Franklin Medal in Chemistry
- 2004 Wolf Prize in Chemistry
- 2009 Welch Award
- 2012 Inducted into the Alpha Chi Sigma Hall of Fame
- 2013 Othmer Gold Medal for outstanding contribution to chemistry and science.

=== Wolf Prize ===
He was awarded the Wolf Prize in Chemistry in 2004 for his pioneering work in bioinorganic chemistry, unraveling novel principles of structure and long-range electron transfer in proteins.

Gray has made generative contributions to the understanding of chemical bonding of metal complexes, mechanisms of inorganic reactions, spectroscopy and magneto-chemistry of inorganic compounds. His study of the first trigonal prismatic complexes is one such example. Harry Gray's most significant work lies at the interface between chemistry and biology. As a pioneer of the important and thriving field of bioinorganic chemistry, he has made many key contributions, the most important of which is the development of fundamental understanding of electron transfer in biological systems, at the atomic level.
