= Cyclopentadienylchromium tricarbonyl dimer =

Names
- IUPAC name bis(tricarbonyl[η^{5}-cyclopentadienyl]chromium)(Cr—Cr)
- Other names cyclopentadienyl chromium carbonyl dimer Bis(tricarbonylcyclopentadienylchromium)

Identifiers
CAS Number	12194-12-6
3D model (JSmol)	Interactive image
ChemSpider	9037595
PubChem CID	134871162; 10862305
- InChI: InChI=1S/2C5H5.6CO.2Cr/c2*1-2-4-5-3-1;6*1-2;;/h2*1-5H;;;;;;;; Key: VIBRSGQAZCSDSN-UHFFFAOYSA-N
- SMILES: c1[cH-]ccc1.[O+]#C[Cr-2](C#[O+])(C#[O+])[Cr-2](C#[O+])(C#[O+])(C#[O+]).c1[cH-]ccc1

Properties
Chemical formula	C_{16}H_{10}Cr_{2}O_{6}
Molar mass	402.242 g·mol^{−1}
Appearance	green solid
Density	2.738 g/cm^{3}
Solubility in water	insoluble

Hazards
- Occupational safety and health (OHS/OSH)
Main hazards	flammable
- Except where otherwise noted, data are given for materials in their standard state (at 25 °C [77 °F], 100 kPa). Infobox references

Cyclopentadienylchromium tricarbonyl dimer is the organochromium compound with the formula Cp_{2}Cr_{2}(CO)_{6}, where Cp is C_{5}H_{5}. It is a dark green crystalline solid, existing in measurable equilibrium quantities with the monometallic radical CpCr(CO)_{3}.

== Structure and synthesis ==
The six CO ligands are terminal, and the Cr-Cr bond distance is 3.281 Å, 0.06 Å longer than the related dimolybdenum compound. The compound is prepared by treatment of chromium hexacarbonyl with sodium cyclopentadienide followed by oxidation of the resulting NaCr(CO)_{3}(C_{5}H_{5}).

== Related compounds ==
- Cyclopentadienylmolybdenum tricarbonyl dimer
- Cyclopentadienyltungsten tricarbonyl dimer
