= Cyclopentadienyltungsten tricarbonyl dimer =

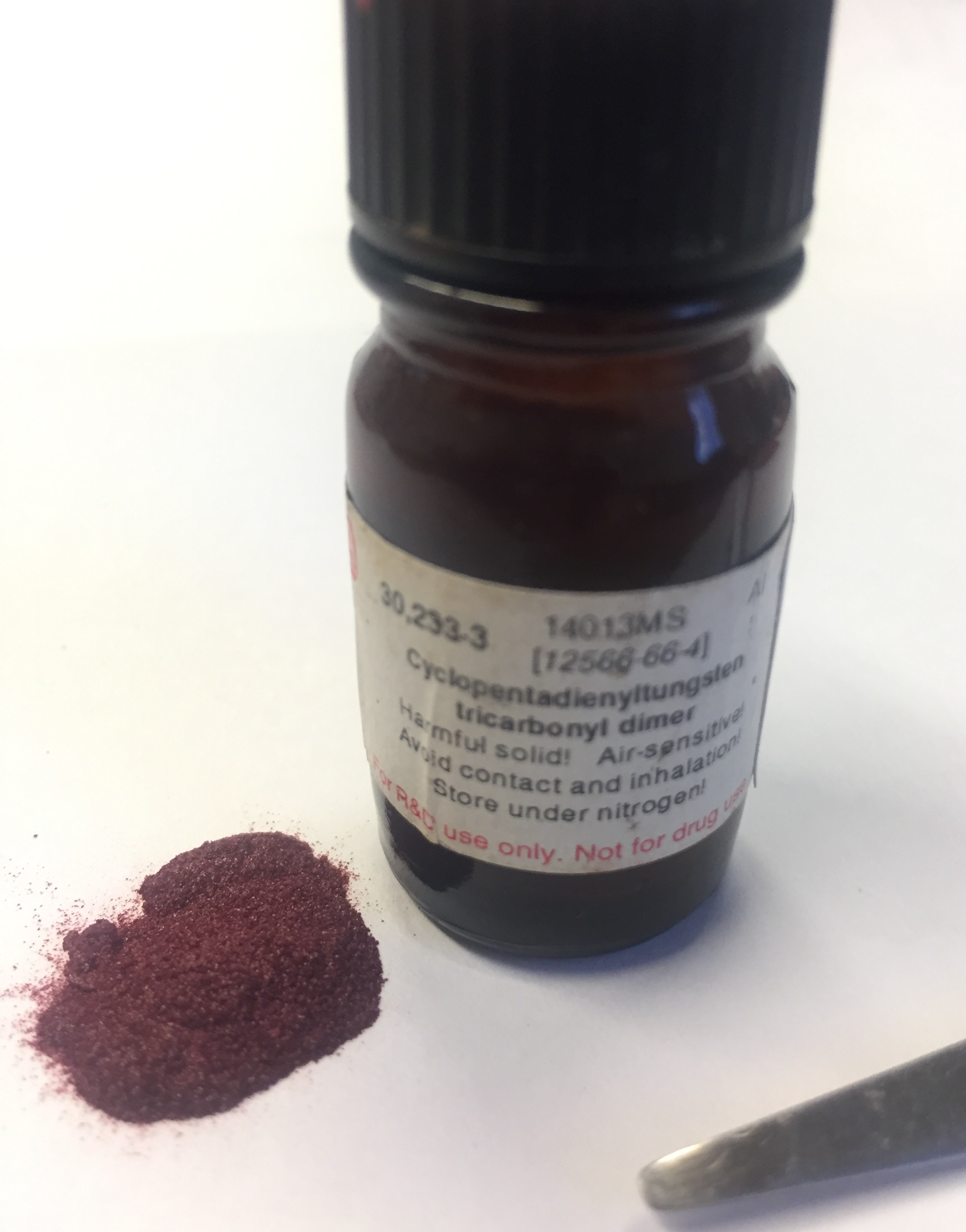

Names
- IUPAC name bis(tricarbonyl[η^{5}-cyclopentadienyl]tungsten)(W—W)
- Other names cyclopentadienyl tungsten carbonyl dimer Bis(tricarbonylcyclopentadienyltungsten)

Identifiers
CAS Number	12566-66-4
3D model (JSmol)	Interactive image
ChemSpider	10159961
ECHA InfoCard	100.149.757
PubChem CID	45051817
- InChI: InChI=1S/2C5H5.6CO.2W/c2*1-2-4-5-3-1;6*1-2;;/h2*1-5H;;;;;;;; Key: QHDDHZCGENYXAV-UHFFFAOYSA-N
- SMILES: [C-]#[O+].[C-]#[O+].[C-]#[O+].[C-]#[O+].[C-]#[O+].[C-]#[O+].[CH]1[CH][CH][CH][CH]1.[CH]1[CH][CH][CH][CH]1.[W].[W]

Properties
Chemical formula	C_{16}H_{10}O_{6}W_{2}
Molar mass	665.93 g·mol^{−1}
Appearance	red solid
Density	2.738 g/cm^{3}
Solubility in water	insoluble

Hazards
- Occupational safety and health (OHS/OSH)
Main hazards	flammable
- Except where otherwise noted, data are given for materials in their standard state (at 25 °C [77 °F], 100 kPa). Infobox references

Cyclopentadienyltungsten tricarbonyl dimer is the organotungsten compound with the formula Cp_{2}W_{2}(CO)_{6}, where Cp is C_{5}H_{5}. A dark red crystalline solid, it is the subject of research, although it has no or few practical uses.

== Structure and synthesis ==
The molecule exists in two rotamers, gauche and anti. The six CO ligands are terminal, and the W-W bond distance is 3.222 Å. The compound is prepared by treatment of tungsten hexacarbonyl with sodium cyclopentadienide followed by oxidation of the resulting NaW(CO)_{3}(C_{5}H_{5}).

== Related compounds ==
- Cyclopentadienylmolybdenum tricarbonyl dimer
- Cyclopentadienylchromium tricarbonyl dimer
