= Liviu Mirica =

American chemist

Liviu M. Mirica
- Education: California Institute of Technology (B.A.) (1999); Stanford University (Ph.D.) (2005)
- Scientific career
- Fields: Inorganic Chemistry; Organometallic Chemistry; Chemical Biology
- Workplaces: University of Illinois; Washington University
- Thesis: Mechanistic Investigations of Model Complexes Relevant to Copper Containing Enzymes (2005)
- Doctoral advisor: T. Daniel P. Stack
- Other academic advisors: Harry B. Gray; Judith P. Klinman
- Website: mirica.web.illinois.edu

Liviu M. Mirica is the Janet and William H. Lycan Professor of Chemistry at the University of Illinois at Urbana-Champaign, known for his work in organometallic chemistry and nickel-based catalysis. He was elected in 2018 as a Fellow of the Royal Society of Chemistry, and in 2022 as a Fellow of the American Association for the Advancement of Science. His research interests include using synthetic, inorganic and organometallic chemistry to study novel transition metal complexes with applications for sustainable catalysis. He has also worked on developing bifunctional diagnostic and therapeutic agents for amyloid-beta-related disorders such as Alzheimer's disease, while continuing to investigate the roles of transition metal ions in neurodegenerative diseases.

== Early life and education ==
Mirica studied chemistry as an undergraduate at California Institute of Technology in the lab of Harry B. Gray, where he received his B.A. in 1999. He continued his studies at Stanford University where he received his Ph.D. in 2005 under the guidance of T. Daniel P. Stack. He continued his work as a NIH postdoctoral fellow at University of California, Berkeley, working with Judith P. Klinman.

== Career ==
=== Independent career ===
Mirica began his independent career in 2008, joining the Department of Chemistry faculty in the Arts and Sciences at Washington University in St. Louis. In 2013, he was the recipient of the National Science Foundation CAREER Award. In 2014, he was the recipient of the Organometallics Young Investigator Fellowship from the ACS Division of Inorganic Chemistry. In 2019, he moved to the University of Illinois at Urbana-Champaign to join the faculty as a Janet and William H. Lycan Professor of Chemistry. He is also a professor in Biomedical and Translational Sciences and at the Beckman Institute for Advanced Science and Technology.
