= Cyclopentadienylmolybdenum tricarbonyl dimer =

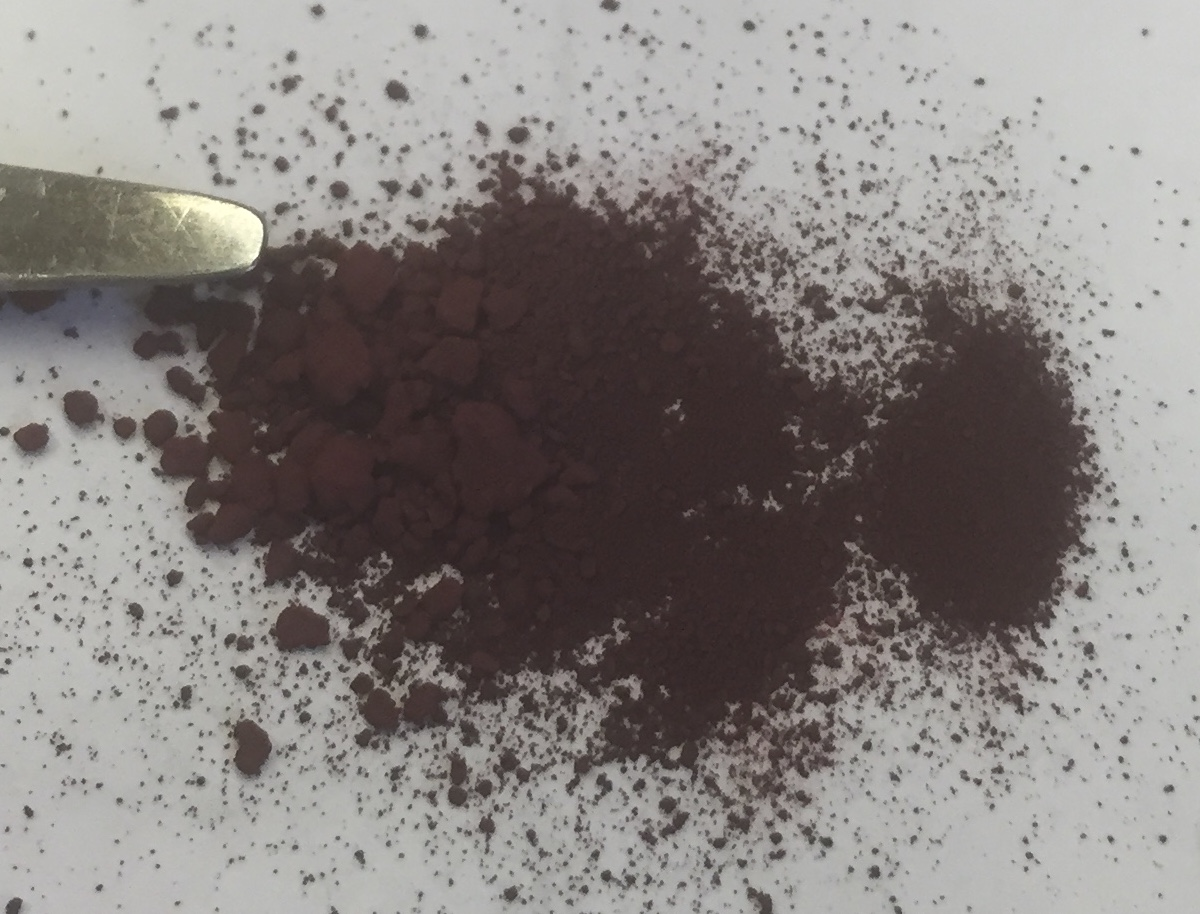

Names
- IUPAC name bis(tricarbonyl[η^{5}-cyclopentadienyl]molybdenum)(Mo—Mo)
- Other names cyclopentadienyl molybdenum carbonyl dimer Bis(tricarbonylcyclopentadienylmolybdenum)

Identifiers
| CAS Number | 12091-64-4 |
| 3D model (JSmol) | Interactive image |
| ChemSpider | 21241602 |
| ECHA InfoCard | 100.031.948 |
| EC Number | 235-156-0 |
| PubChem CID | 11113722 |
- InChI: InChI=1S/2C5H5.6CO.2Mo/c2*1-2-4-5-3-1;6*1-2;;/h2*1-5H;;;;;;;; Key: XCUPBPUEWLTPMQ-UHFFFAOYSA-N
- SMILES: [C-]#[O+].[C-]#[O+].[C-]#[O+].[C-]#[O+].[C-]#[O+].[C-]#[O+].C1=C[CH]C=C1.C1=C[CH]C=C1.[Mo].[Mo]

Properties
| Chemical formula | Mo_{2}(η-C_{5}H_{5})_{2}(CO)_{6} |
| Molar mass | 490.15 g·mol^{−1} |
| Appearance | dark red crystalline solid |
| Melting point | 222 °C (432 °F; 495 K) |
| Boiling point | dec. |
| Solubility in water | insoluble |

Structure
| Crystal structure | monoclinic |
| Dipole moment | 0.112 D |

Hazards
- Occupational safety and health (OHS/OSH)
| Main hazards | flammable |
- GHS labelling
| Pictograms | (GHS06: Toxic) (GHS07: Exclamation mark) |
| Signal word | Danger |
| Hazard statements | H302, H312, H332 |

Related compounds
| Related compounds | (η-C_{5}H_{5})_{2}Mo_{2}(CO)_{4} |
- Except where otherwise noted, data are given for materials in their standard state (at 25 °C [77 °F], 100 kPa). verify (what is ?) Infobox references

Cyclopentadienylmolybdenum tricarbonyl dimer is the chemical compound with the formula Cp_{2}Mo_{2}(CO)_{6}, where Cp is C_{5}H_{5}. A dark red solid, it has been the subject of much research although it has no known practical uses.

== Structure and synthesis ==
The molecule exists in two rotamers, gauche and anti. The six CO ligands are terminal and the Mo-Mo bond distance is 3.2325 Å. The compound is prepared by treatment of molybdenum hexacarbonyl with sodium cyclopentadienide followed by oxidation of the resulting NaMo(CO)_{3}(C_{5}H_{5}). Other methods have been developed starting with Mo(CO)_{3}(CH_{3}CN)_{3} instead of Mo(CO)_{6}.

== Reactions ==
Thermolysis of this compound in hot solution of diglyme (bis(2-methoxyethyl)ether) results in decarbonylation, giving the tetracarbonyl, which has a formal triple bond between the Mo centers (d_{MoMo} = 2.448 Å):

(C_{5}H_{5})_{2}Mo_{2}(CO)_{6} → (C_{5}H_{5})_{2}Mo_{2}(CO)_{4} + 2 CO

The resulting cyclopentadienylmolybdenum dicarbonyl dimer in turn binds a variety of substrates across the metal-metal triple bond.

== Related compounds ==
- Cyclopentadienyltungsten tricarbonyl dimer
- Cyclopentadienylchromium tricarbonyl dimer
- The indenyl complex [(C_{9}H_{7})Mo(CO)_{3}]_{2}
