= Tracy Teal =

American bioinformatician

Tracy K. Teal
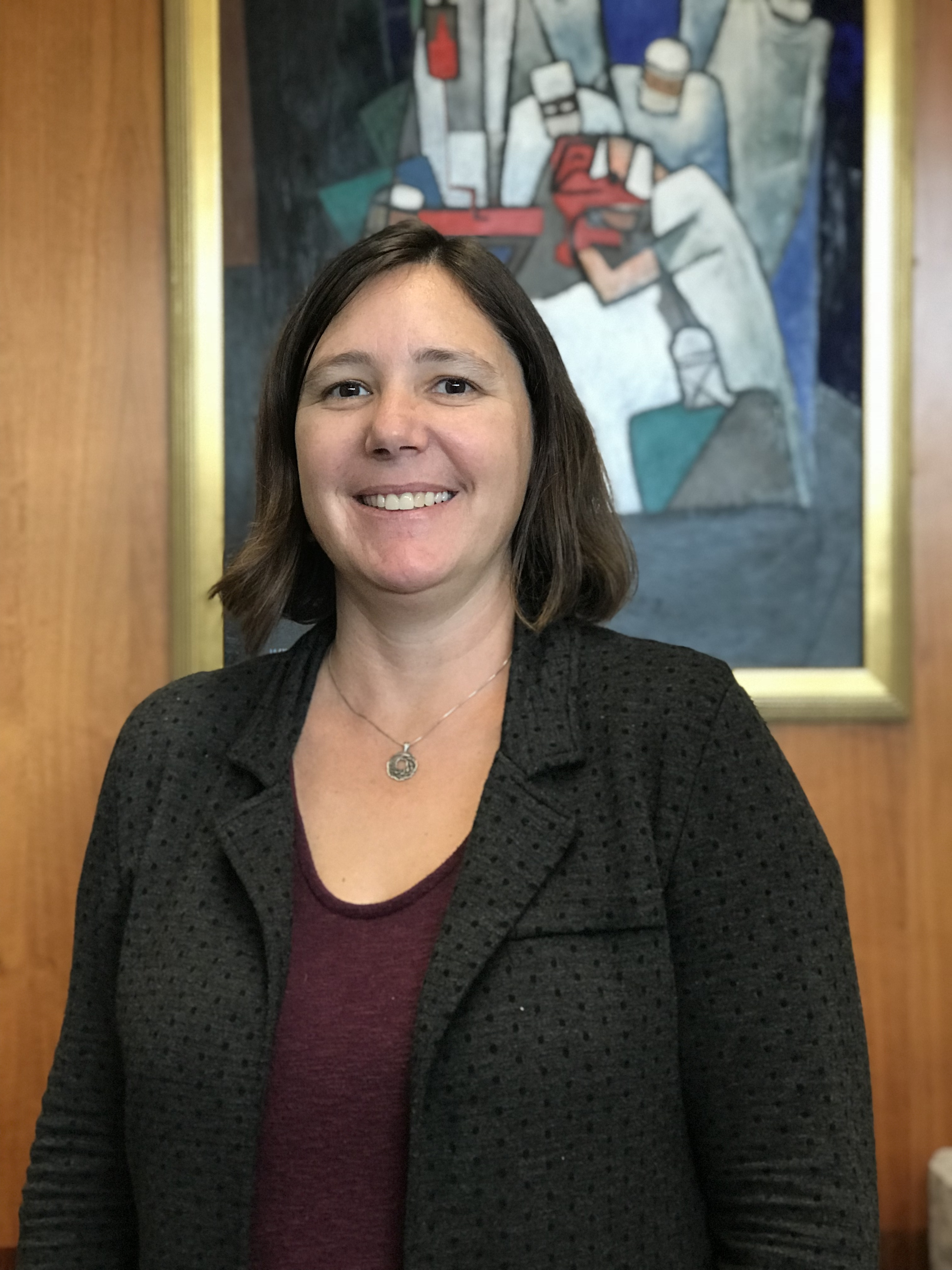
- Education: University of California, Los Angeles; California Institute of Technology
- Known for: Democratizing data science skills
- Scientific career
- Fields: Open Science; Data Science; Bioinformatics
- Workplaces: Michigan State University; Data Carpentry
- Thesis: Studies of the spatial organization of metabolism in Shewanella oneidensis and Pseudomonas aeruginosa biofilms (2007)
- Doctoral advisor: Dianne Newman; Barbara Wold
- Website: Github

Tracy Teal is an American bioinformatician and the executive director of Data Carpentry. She is known for her work in open science and biomedical data science education.

== Education and early career ==
Teal received her Bachelors of Science in Cybernetics from the University of California, Los Angeles in 1997 and later received her Master of Arts in Organismal Biology, Ecology, and Evolution in 1999. There, she worked in the laboratory of Charles Taylor, studying how the evolution of language is impacted by the way people learn it. She then earned her PhD from the California Institute of Technology in Computation and Neural Systems in 2007. She did her thesis work under the laboratories of Dianne Newman and Barbara Wold, studying the metabolic organization of bacterial biofilms.

After graduate school, Teal became a National Science Foundation Postdoctoral Fellow at Michigan State University, where she studied how the ecology of microbial communities in soil can change levels of greenhouse gases by either producing or consuming them.

== Research ==
During her postdoctoral fellowship at Michigan State University, Teal studied how agricultural practices affect soil microbe communities, which in turn affect the stability of greenhouse gas levels. Agriculture has a major impact on the diversity of microbes in soil, and a subset of those microbes produce carbon dioxide and consume methane, both greenhouse gases. She wanted to understand how agricultural land use affects the flux of these two greenhouse gases, so she used metagenomics approaches to track the diversity of microbes collected from soil samples across a range of agricultural land use. She tracked the stability of methane consumption and carbon dioxide emission associated with the different soil samples and found that sites that were no longer used for agriculture had a higher diversity of microbes. In particular, she found that sites with a high diversity of methanotrophs, or bacteria that oxidize methane, have more stable levels of methane consumption, which suggested that managing lands to maintain methanotroph diversity could be a good way of managing levels of this greenhouse gas. To do facilitate this work, Teal developed bioinformatics tools to remove systematic artifacts for more precise metagenomics analyses.

Following her fellowship, Teal became a research associate and later assistant professor at Michigan State University in microbiology and molecular biology. Her lab was part of the BEACON Center for the Study of Evolution in Action, a National Science Foundation research center that brings together biologists, computer scientists, and engineers to study evolution in real time and use findings from the natural world to solve real-world problems—from disaster management to engineering safer cars. As a professor, she developed and led a bioinformatics training program in the Microbiology and Molecular Genetics Department. She has also worked to develop open source bioinformatics software for a range of applications, from RNA-sequencing analysis to establishing best practices for computational workflows for biologists. Teal also continued her research in metagenomics and microbial ecology in agriculture, as well as extending her focus out to study the intestinal microbiome and viral communities in ballast water.

== Data Carpentry ==
During her tenure at Michigan State University, Teal became an instructor for Software Carpentry, an organization that teaches software development to researchers. She and a team of collaborators developed Data Carpentry based on the Software Carpentries model, developing curricula and leading workshops for researchers to increase data literacy in the age of big data. The workshops are geared towards teaching fundamental concepts, skills, and tools to work more effectively and reproducibly with data in a variety of scientific domains.

The workshops became the basis for the organization Data Carpentry, with Teal serving as its executive director. In 2015, Data Carpentry received a $750,000 grant from the Moore Foundation to grow its core team, develop better infrastructure to train and support new instructors, develop domain-specific training content, and conduct more workshops for researchers. In 2016, Data Carpentry drafted its mission and vision statement to "build communities teaching universal data literacy." Through its network of volunteer instructors, Data Carpentry has since developed lesson plans for a variety of scientific domains, including ecology, genomics, and social science and is in the process of developing materials for astronomy, digital humanities, economics, and more. She has co-authored a number of papers establishing roadmaps to data competencies for the current and next-generation of researchers in environmental research and for researchers in general.
