= Eric H. Davidson =

American biologist (1937–2015)

- Born: April 13, 1937; New York City, New York
- Died: September 1, 2015 (aged 78); Pasadena, California
- Education: University of Pennsylvania (BA, 1958) and Rockefeller University (Ph.D., 1963)
- Known for: Gene regulatory networks Sea urchin Developmental biology
- Awards: Alexander von Humboldt Foundation Awardee, A.O. Kowalevsky Medal (2002), International Prize for Biology (2011)
- Scientific career
- Fields: Developmental biology
- Workplaces: California Institute of Technology
- Thesis: The expression of differentiated character in monolayer tissue culture cells (1963)
- Doctoral advisor: Alfred Mirsky
- Doctoral students: Barbara Wold

Notes
- Member of the National Academy of Sciences (1985) and Fellow of the American Association for the Advancement of Science (1980)

Eric Harris Davidson (April 13, 1937 – September 1, 2015) was an American developmental biologist at the California Institute of Technology. Davidson was best known for his pioneering work on the role of gene regulation in evolution, on embryonic specification and for spearheading the effort to sequence the genome of the purple sea urchin, Strongylocentrotus purpuratus. He devoted a large part of his professional career to developing an understanding of embryogenesis at the genetic level. He wrote many academic works describing his work, including a textbook on early animal development.

== Early career ==
Davidson began conducting research as a teenager at The Marine Biological Laboratory. After graduating from high school, he matriculated to the University of Pennsylvania and graduated with a B.A. in biology in 1958. Davidson's Ph.D. work entailed studying RNA synthesis and gene expression in early development of the anuran Xenopus laevis in the lab of Alfred Mirsky at Rockefeller University. Davidson returned to the Marine Biological Laboratory to serve for two terms as Director or Co-Director of the Embryology Course, from 1988 through 1996.

== From Rockefeller to Caltech ==
After obtaining his Ph.D., Davidson stayed on at Rockefeller first as a research associate and then as an assistant professor. In 1971, he moved to the California Institute of Technology as an associate professor. There, Davidson took an interest in development of marine invertebrates, especially of the purple sea urchin Strongylocentrotus purpuratus, and in investigating the function of genomic repetitive DNA elements, both interests of which would lead to a long line of investigation that eventually led to his contemporary interest in gene regulatory networks.

== Career in biology ==
Davidson has spent the majority of his scientific career investigating the molecular and mechanistic basis of animal development, i.e. how animals are built by reading the instructions encoded in the egg and, ultimately, in the genome. While at Rockefeller and very early in his career, he and Roy Britten, then at the Carnegie Institution of Washington, speculated on how the products of transcription, e.g. various RNAs or other downstream products, would need to in principle interact in order for cellular differentiation and gene regulation to occur in multicellular organisms. This research program eventually led him to investigations regarding the role of gene regulation in cell lineage and embryonic territory specification, both endeavors of which contributed substantially to many biological disciplines, including developmental biology, systems biology and evolutionary developmental biology. In 2007, he was awarded the Lifetime Achievement Award from the Society for Developmental Biology. In 2011, he was awarded the International Prize for Biology in recognition for his pioneering work on developmental gene regulatory networks.

Shortly before his death from a heart attack in 2015, Davidson co-authored a landmark review book providing a grand synthesis of the theory and experimental evidence relating to the design and function of genomic regulatory networks within the animal taxonomic clade of Bilateria.

== Sexual harassment allegations ==
In 1992, Kellie Whittaker, a doctoral student at Caltech sued the university and Prof. Eric Davidson, stating that he had repeatedly asked for sexual favours between 1989 and 1991. She had previously filed a sexual harassment charge with Caltech, which found that Davidson's behaviour was “inappropriate and unethical in the context of a student/adviser situation,” but that no sexual harassment occurred.

== Interest in American Folk Music ==
In the 1950s and 1960s Davidson traveled throughout Grayson and Caroll counties in Virginia recording traditional folk music. These recordings were eventually deposited in the Smithsonian Folkways collection.

== Selected bibliography ==
- Isabelle S. Peter and Eric H. Davidson Genomic Control Process: Development and Evolution (2015) ISBN 978-0-12-404729-7
- Britten R.; E.H. Davidson (1969). "Gene regulation for higher cells: a theory". Science. 165 (3891): 349–57. Bibcode:1969Sci...165..349B. doi:10.1126/science.165.3891.349. PMID 5789433.
- Gene Activity in Early Development (1987) ISBN 0-12-205161-0
- Genomic Regulatory Systems: Development and Evolution (2001) ISBN 0-12-205351-6
- Davidson, E.H.; J.P. Rast; P. Oliveri; et al. (2002). "A genomic regulatory network for development". Science. 295 (5560): 1669–78. Bibcode:2002Sci...295.1669D. doi:10.1126/science.1069883. PMID 11872831. S2CID 1446658.
- The Regulatory Genome: Gene Regulatory Networks In Development And Evolution (2006) ISBN 0-12-088563-8
