= Ellen Rothenberg (scientist) =

American biologist

Ellen V. Rothenberg
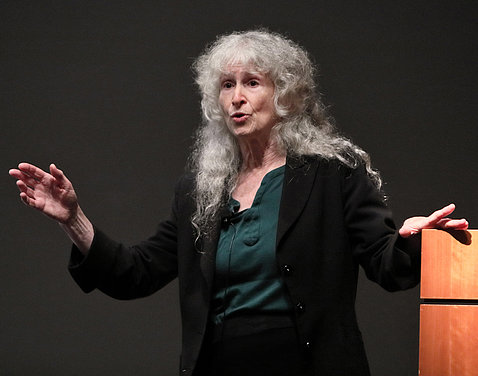
- Rothenberg speaks at the National Institutes of Health in 2018
- Born: 1952 (age 73–74)
- Education: Massachusetts Institute of Technology; Harvard University
- Scientific career
- Workplaces: California Institute of Technology; Memorial Sloan-Kettering Cancer Center
- Thesis: In vitro synthesis of biologically active DNA of murine leukemia virus. (1977)
- Website: T-cell developmental gene network

Ellen V. Rothenberg (born 1952) is an American biologist who is an Edward B. Lewis Professor of Biology at the California Institute of Technology. She investigates the molecular mechanisms that underpin lineage choice. She is an elected fellow of the American Association for the Advancement of Science, American Academy of Arts and Sciences and the National Academy of Sciences.

== Early life and education ==
Rothenberg describes her upbringing as "sex-blind". She credits her parents with giving her a strong sense of one's potential and says her father "taught [her] math and logic to the point that [she] got in trouble with [her] teachers". As a child, Rothenberg originally wanted to become a physicist, but her high school biology classes inspired her to pursue biochemistry. Her high school teachers taught her about protein structure and how their structures confer biological function. While Rothenberg was an undergraduate student at Harvard University, her tutor, Boris Magasanik, inspired her to work on gene regulation. After earning her bachelor's degree, Rothenberg started a MD–PhD program offered jointly by Harvard Medical School and the Massachusetts Institute of Technology (MIT). She eventually dropped the MD but continued, at MIT, her PhD research with David Baltimore. She was the first to synthesize in vitro the genome of a retrovirus. She completed her doctoral research in the Department of Biology and Center for Cancer Research in 1977. Rothenberg was a Jane Coffin Childs postdoctoral fellow with Edward Boyse at the Memorial Sloan Kettering Cancer Center in New York City.

== Research and career ==
In 1979, Rothenberg was appointed to the faculty at the Salk Institute for Biological Studies, where she spent three years before moving to the California Institute of Technology. She was later named Andrew Dickson White Professor-at-Large at Cornell University over a term spanning from 2021–2027. Rothenberg investigates the molecular mechanisms that underpin lineage selection. This includes the processes that determine the differentiation of hematopoietic stem cells into T cells. There are several steps to this process, in which the multi-potentiality of stem cells are reduced whilst the T-cell specific differentiation events start.

Rothenberg studies the transcription factors that induce gene expression to guide development of T-lineage cells. She has modeled the gene networks involved and the interactions of transcription factors and chromatin. She identified that subtle changes in these pathways can predispose to autoimmunity.

== Awards and honors ==
- 2014 American Association of Immunologists Distinguished Lecturer
- 2016 California Institute of Technology Richard P. Feynman Prize for Excellence in Teaching
- 2017 Elected Fellow of the American Association for the Advancement of Science
- 2018 Elected Fellow of the American Academy of Arts and Sciences
- 2021 Elected Member of the National Academy of Sciences

== Selected publications ==
- Ellen V. Rothenberg; Jonathan E Moore; Mary A. Yui (1 January 2008). "Launching the T-cell-lineage developmental programme". Nature Reviews Immunology. 8 (1): 9–21. doi:10.1038/nri2232. ISSN 1474-1733. PMC 3131407. PMID 18097446. Wikidata Q37039580.
- Tom Taghon; Mary A Yui; Rashmi Pant; Rochelle A Diamond; Ellen V. Rothenberg (1 January 2006). "Developmental and molecular characterization of emerging beta- and gammadelta-selected pre-T cells in the adult mouse thymus". Immunity. 24 (1): 53–64. doi:10.1016/j.immuni.2005.11.012. ISSN 1074-7613. PMID 16413923. Wikidata Q46075028.
- Ellen V Rothenberg; Tom Taghon (1 January 2005). "Molecular genetics of T cell development". Annual Review of Immunology. 23: 601–649. doi:10.1146/annurev.immunol.23.021704.115737. ISSN 0732-0582. PMID 15771582. Wikidata Q36072446.
- Long Li; Mark Leid; Ellen V Rothenberg. (2 July 2010). An Early T Cell Lineage Commitment Checkpoint Dependent on the Transcription Factor Bcl11b Science; Vol. 329; No. 5987; https://doi.org/10.1126/science.1188989. PMC 2935300. PMID 20595614.
- Jingli A Zhang; Ali Mortazavi; Brian A Williams; Barbara J Wold; Ellen V Rothenberg (13 April 2012). Dynamic Transformations of Genome-wide Epigenetic Marking and Transcriptional Control Establish T Cell Identity Cell; Vol. 149; No. 2; https://doi.org/10.1016/j.cell.2012.01.056. PMID 22500808. PMC 3336965.
- Hao Yuan Kueh; Ameya Champhekhar; Stephen L Nutt; Michael B Elowitz; Ellen V Rothenberg (9 August 2013). Positive Feedback Between PU.1 and the Cell Cycle Controls Myeloid Differentiation Science; Vol. 341; No. 6146; https://doi.org/10.1126/science.1240831. PMID 23868921. PMC 3913367.
