= David A. Tirrell =

American chemist

- Born: 1953 (age 72–73); Easton, Pennsylvania, U.S.
- Education: Massachusetts Institute of Technology (BS); University of Massachusetts Amherst (PhD)
- Scientific career
- Fields: Chemical engineering
- Workplaces: Carnegie-Mellon University, University of Massachusetts, California Institute of Technology
- Doctoral students: Kristi Kiick
- Website: tirrell-lab.caltech.edu/DavidTirrell

External videos
- Reinterpreting the Genetic Code - 2010 Dickson Prize Lecture, Carnegie Mellon University

David A. Tirrell (born 1953) is an American chemist and the Ross McCollum-William H. Corcoran Professor and professor of chemistry and chemical engineering at the California Institute of Technology (Caltech). From 2012 to 2018, Tirrell was the director of the Beckman Institute at Caltech. As of 2017, he serves as Caltech's Provost.

== Early life and education ==
Tirrell earned a B.S. in chemistry at the Massachusetts Institute of Technology (MIT) in 1974. He received a Ph.D. in 1978 from the University of Massachusetts Amherst, where his thesis advisor was Professor Otto Vogl. In 1978, he held a postdoctoral position at Kyoto University.

== Career ==
Tirrell was a faculty member in the department of chemistry at Carnegie-Mellon University from 1978 to 1984. He served as the director of the materials research laboratory at the University of Massachusetts Amherst from 1978 to 1998. He moved to Caltech in 1998 and served as chairman of the division of chemistry and chemical engineering at Caltech from 1999 until 2009. He edited the Journal of Polymer Science from 1988 to 1999.

Tirrell applies principles from biology and chemistry to polymer synthesis. Recognizing that most synthetic polymers are mixtures, rather than pure substances, he developed pioneering techniques for the creation of precisely defined polymers of uniform structure. Tirrell and his co-workers have formed crystals, liquid crystals and gels with predetermined, programmable molecular architectures and accompanying properties. His work in macromolecular synthesis underlies the development of "smart" materials, which respond to external cues like temperature, pH, chemical reagents, or light.

Tirrell has gone on to make important contributions to protein biosynthesis, effectively reprogramming the genetic code of biological cells to produce artificial, protein-like macromolecules. Specialized macromolecules may provide materials for use in surgery and regenerative medicine. Areas that he is exploring include the use of artificial amino acids in the preparation of proteins, the evolution of novel proteins, and analysis of cellular processes.

He is one of very few American scientists to have been elected to all three branches of the United States National Academies: the National Academy of Sciences (2006), the National Academy of Engineering (2008), and the Institute of Medicine (2011). He was elected a Member of the American Philosophical Society in 2019.

== Awards and honors ==
Tirrell is an elected member of all three branches of the United States National Academies: the National Academy of Sciences (2006), the National Academy of Engineering (2008), and the Institute of Medicine (2011). He is also an elected member of the American Academy of Arts and Sciences, a fellow of the American Chemical Society (2010), and a fellow of the National Academy of Inventors (2018).

He has received a number of awards, including:

- 2011, Member, Institute of Medicine
- 2010, Dickson Prize in Science, Carnegie Mellon University
- 2008, Member, National Academy of Engineering
- 2007, Arthur C. Cope Scholar Award (American Chemical Society)
- 2006, Member, National Academy of Sciences
- 2006, S. C. Lind Lecturer, East Tennessee Section, American Chemical Society
- 2004, G. N. Lewis Lecturer, University of California Berkeley
- 2001, ACS Award in Polymer Chemistry
- 2001, honorary doctorate from the Technical University of Eindhoven
- 1997, Chancellor's Medal of the University of Massachusetts
- 1996, Harrison Howe Award, Rochester Section, American Chemical Society
- 1991, Carl S. Marvel Creative Polymer Chemistry Award
