= Ralph Pearson =

American chemist (1919–2022)

- Born: Ralph Gottfrid Pearson; January 12, 1919; Chicago, Illinois, U.S.
- Died: October 12, 2022 (aged 103)
- Education: Northwestern University
- Known for: Development of hard and soft acid base theory (HSAB)
- Scientific career
- Fields: Inorganic chemistry
- Workplaces: Northwestern University; University of California at Santa Barbara

Ralph Gottfrid Pearson (January 12, 1919 – October 12, 2022) was an American physical inorganic chemist best known for the development of the concept of hard and soft acids and bases (HSAB).

He received his Ph.D. in physical chemistry in 1943 from Northwestern University, and taught chemistry at Northwestern faculty from 1946 until 1976, when he moved to University of California at Santa Barbara (UCSB). He retired in 1989 but remained active in research in theoretical inorganic chemistry until his death.

In 1958 Pearson and Fred Basolo, his colleague at Northwestern wrote the influential monograph "Mechanisms of Inorganic Reactions", which integrated concepts from ligand field theory and physical organic chemistry and signaled a shift from descriptive coordination chemistry to a more quantitative science. With another Northwestern colleague, Arthur Atwater Frost, Pearson wrote in 1961 another classic text, Kinetics and Mechanism: A Study of Homogeneous Chemical Reactions (ISBN 9780471283478). A subsequent edition was with John W. Moore as co-author (ISBN 978-0471035589).

A qualitative theory of hard and soft acids and bases (HSAB) was proposed in 1963 in an attempt to unify the theories of reactivity in inorganic and organic chemistry. In this theory 'Hard' applies to species that are small, have high charge states, and are weakly polarizable. 'Soft' applies to species that are large, have low charge states and are strongly polarizable. Acids and bases interact, and the most stable interactions are hard–hard and soft–soft.

In 1983 in collaboration with Robert Parr, he refined the HSAB theory into a quantitative method by calculating values of “absolute hardness” using density functional theory, an approximate method in molecular quantum mechanics. This concept of "absolute hardness" was later connected with the concept of (absolute) electronegativity. Pearson died on October 12, 2022, at the age of 103.

== Honours ==
- American Chemical Society Award for Distinguished Service to Inorganic Chemistry 1970
- Member of National Academy of Sciences 1974
