= Jay R. Winkler =

American physical chemist (born 1956)

Jay Richmond Winkler, Ph.D. (b. January 28, 1956), is an American physical chemist, currently director of the Beckman Institute Laser Resource Center at the California Institute of Technology. He has authored over two hundred twenty five articles on applications of inorganic spectroscopy, including the pioneering study of intramolecular electron transfer reactions in biological systems.

== Career ==
Winkler received his bachelor's degree in chemistry from Stanford University. During this time he distinguished himself as a student of Professor Henry Taube, authoring a paper on the electronic structure and reactivity of osmium ammine complexes. Winkler received his Ph.D. in chemistry at the California Institute of Technology under the mentorship of Professor Harry B. Gray. There, he continued his study of inorganic electronic structure, publishing extensively on the properties of transition metal oxo complexes, ligand exchange reactions, and oxidation reduction chemistry. It was also during this time that he developed an experimental technique for measuring intramolecular electron transfer rates in proteins, work that would shape the course of Gray lab chemistry for the coming decades. Following completion of his doctoral work, Winkler joined the Brookhaven National Laboratory, where he continued his studies of inorganic photochemistry alongside Norman Sutin, Carol Creutz, and Bruce Brunschwig. In 1990 he was asked to join the Beckman Institute under the directorship of his former advisor, Harry Gray. He remains a Member of the Beckman Institute and the Director of the Beckman Institute Laser Resource Center.

== Research ==
As Director of the Beckman Institute Laser Resource Center, Winkler manages facilities comprising instrumentation for picosecond and nanosecond scale photochemistry. He maintains a research program intimately connected with that of Harry Gray, wherein he continues to investigate electron transfer chemistry. Recently his efforts have focused on the application of picosecond-scale fluorescence resonance energy transfer to probe pathways of protein folding. Winkler also participates in the multi-institution NSF Center for Chemical Initiative, a program uniting investigators across multiple disciplines aimed at developing sustainable solar energy.
